= Modern pentathlon at the 1972 Summer Olympics – Men's individual =

Men's individual modern pentathlon at the Games of the XX Olympiad
- Dates: August 27–31
- Competitors: 59 from 20 nations

Medalists
1st place, gold medalist(s)		András Balczó	Hungary
2nd place, silver medalist(s)		Boris Onischenko	Soviet Union
3rd place, bronze medalist(s)		Pavel Lednev	Soviet Union

The individual modern pentathlon at the 1972 Summer Olympics was one of two modern pentathlon events (both for men), along with the team competition. As usual in Olympic modern pentathlon, one competition was held and each competitor's score was included to the Individual competition event results table and was also added to his teammates' scores to be included to the Team competition event results table. This competition consisted of 5 disciplines:

- Equestrian, held on August 27
- Fencing, held on August 28
- Shooting, held on August 29
- Swimming, held on August 30
- Cross-country, held on August 31

== Results ==
Rank	Pentathlete	Nation	Riding	Fencing	Shooting	Swimming	Running	Total
1st place, gold medalist(s)	András Balczó	Hungary	1060	1057	956	1060	1279	5412
2nd place, silver medalist(s)	Boris Onischenko	Soviet Union	945	1076	1066	1128	1120	5335
3rd place, bronze medalist(s)	Pavel Lednev	Soviet Union	1060	1019	1022	1092	1135	5328
4	Jeremy Robert Fox	Great Britain	1100	1019	868	1024	1300	5311
5	Vladimir Shmelyov	Soviet Union	920	962	1022	1176	1222	5302
6	Björn Ferm	Sweden	1100	943	978	1112	1150	5283
7	Heiner Thade	West Germany	1065	962	956	1012	1150	5145
8	Risto Hurme	Finland	950	981	1044	1068	1051	5094
9	Charles Richards	United States	1060	753	956	1260	1045	5074
10	Michel Gueguen	France	1100	848	846	1152	1126	5072
11	John Fitzgerald	United States	1090	848	868	1204	1060	5070
12	Zsigmond Villányi	Hungary	975	981	868	1100	1123	5047
13	Ryszard Wach	Poland	1100	715	956	1076	1126	4973
14	Jørn Steffensen	Denmark	1005	791	934	1028	1129	4887
15	Pál Bakó	Hungary	940	772	912	1120	1135	4879
16	Mario Medda	Italy	895	753	1088	1040	1087	4863
17	Veikko Salminen	Finland	1015	772	714	1216	1135	4852
18	Wolfgang Leu	Austria	1085	848	934	1012	973	4852
19	Martti Ketelä	Finland	1045	810	912	1016	1066	4849
20	Walter Esser	West Germany	1000	829	824	1080	1093	4826
21	Janusz Pyciak-Peciak	Poland	1070	905	560	1060	1222	4817
22	Jean-Pierre Giudicelli	France	960	658	868	1084	1237	4807
23	Dumitru Spirlea	Romania	975	810	1022	932	1015	4754
24	Bo Jansson	Sweden	1005	848	780	1076	1030	4739
25	Hans-Gunnar Liljenwall	Sweden	1020	867	670	1048	1099	4704
26	Georgi Stoyanov	Bulgaria	1100	734	890	944	1027	4695
27	Hole Rößler	West Germany	945	696	846	1140	1051	4678
28	Urs Hugi	Switzerland	1075	962	846	952	826	4661
29	Scott Taylor	United States	965	677	626	1100	1288	4656
30	Raoul Gueguen	France	930	772	824	1016	1096	4638
31	Masaru Sakano	Japan	1050	582	846	972	1177	4627
32	Robert Gordon Barrie	Australia	1030	544	912	1132	982	4600
33	Yuso Makihira	Japan	1005	753	736	876	1213	4583
34	Giovanni Perugini	Italy	1065	810	736	1024	946	4581
35	Peter Zobl-Wessely	Austria	880	791	846	908	1120	4545
36	Barry Lillywhite	Great Britain	1070	829	582	1052	994	4527
37	Klaus Petersen	Denmark	990	753	692	1108	949	4492
38	Marian Cosmescu	Romania	1045	658	824	996	967	4490
39	Nicolo Deligia	Italy	1055	715	736	912	1069	4487
40	Stanislaw Skwira	Poland	785	791	846	1160	904	4486
41	Peter Neville Macken	Australia	770	677	956	896	1150	4449
42	Gilberto Toledano Sanchez	Mexico	1090	772	670	908	988	4428
43	Eduarde Olivera Lastra	Mexico	960	734	868	1020	844	4426
44	Bruno Jerebicnik	Austria	835	848	824	908	1000	4415
45	Hans Müler	Switzerland	965	696	846	948	937	4392
46	Jan Bekkenk	Netherlands	930	677	692	1008	1084	4391
47	Robert Lawson Phelps	Great Britain	955	658	736	1000	1036	4385
48	Albert Covacs	Romania	815	582	714	1204	1066	4381
49	Akira Kubo	Japan	860	677	912	880	1042	4371
50	Velko Bratanov	Bulgaria	785	658	956	916	1024	4339
51	Beat Ganz	Switzerland	1030	639	670	888	1096	4323
52	René Heitmann	Denmark	910	658	626	1008	988	4190
53	Rob Vonk	Netherlands	870	506	692	1208	877	4153
54	Scott Scheuermann	Canada	1005	430	824	1044	769	4072
55	Juan José Castilla Ramos	Mexico	935	601	714	752	1012	4014
56	Kenneth Maaten	Canada	880	544	780	792	991	3987
57	Angel Pepeliankov	Bulgaria	1060	696	0	1080	1135	3971
58	Henk Krediet	Netherlands	985	867	802	0	1132	3786
59	George Skene	Canada	0	487	714	1108	988	3297
