= Modern pentathlon at the 1972 Summer Olympics – Men's team =

Men's modern pentathlon at the Games of the XX Olympiad
- Dates: August 27–31
- Competitors: 57 from 19 nations

Medalists
| 1st place, gold medalist(s) | | Pavel Lednev; Boris Onischenko; Vladimir Shmelev | Soviet Union |
| 2nd place, silver medalist(s) | | Pál Bakó; András Balczó; Zsigmond Villányi | Hungary |
| 3rd place, bronze medalist(s) | | Risto Hurme; Martti Ketelä; Veikko Salminen | Finland |

The team modern pentathlon at the 1972 Summer Olympics was one of two events (both for men), along with the individual competition. As usual in Olympic modern pentathlon, one competition was held and each competitor's score was included to the Individual competition event results table and was also added to his teammates' scores to be included to the Team competition event results table. This competition consisted of 5 disciplines:

- Equestrian, held on August 27
- Fencing, held on August 28
- Shooting, held on August 29
- Swimming, held on August 30
- Cross-country, held on August 31

== Results ==
| Rank | Nation | Pentathlete | Riding | Fencing | Shooting | Swimming | Running | Total | Team score |
|---|---|---|---|---|---|---|---|---|---|
| 1st place, gold medalist(s) | Soviet Union | Boris Onischenko | 945 | 1080 | 1066 | 1128 | 1120 | 5339 | 15968 |
| 1st place, gold medalist(s) | Soviet Union | Pavel Lednev | 1060 | 1020 | 1022 | 1092 | 1135 | 5329 | 15968 |
| 1st place, gold medalist(s) | Soviet Union | Vladimir Shmelev | 920 | 960 | 1022 | 1176 | 1222 | 5300 | 15968 |
| 2nd place, silver medalist(s) | Hungary | András Balczó | 1060 | 1040 | 956 | 1060 | 1279 | 5395 | 15348 |
| 2nd place, silver medalist(s) | Hungary | Zsigmond Villányi | 975 | 980 | 868 | 1100 | 1123 | 5046 | 15348 |
| 2nd place, silver medalist(s) | Hungary | Pál Bakó | 940 | 800 | 868 | 1120 | 1135 | 4907 | 15348 |
| 3rd place, bronze medalist(s) | Finland | Risto Hurme | 950 | 980 | 1044 | 1068 | 1051 | 5093 | 14812 |
| 3rd place, bronze medalist(s) | Finland | Veikko Salminen | 1015 | 800 | 714 | 1216 | 1135 | 4880 | 14812 |
| 3rd place, bronze medalist(s) | Finland | Martti Ketelä | 1045 | 800 | 912 | 1016 | 1066 | 4839 | 14812 |
| 4 | United States | Charles Richards | 1060 | 740 | 956 | 1260 | 1045 | 5061 | 14802 |
| 4 | United States | John Fitzgerald | 1090 | 840 | 868 | 1204 | 1060 | 5062 | 14802 |
| 4 | United States | Scott Taylor | 965 | 700 | 626 | 1100 | 1288 | 4679 | 14802 |
| 5 | Sweden | Björn Ferm | 1100 | 940 | 978 | 1112 | 1150 | 5280 | 14708 |
| 5 | Sweden | Bo Jansson | 1005 | 860 | 780 | 1076 | 1030 | 4751 | 14708 |
| 5 | Sweden | Hans-Gunnar Liljenvall | 1020 | 840 | 670 | 1048 | 1099 | 4677 | 14708 |
| 6 | West Germany | Heiner Thade | 1065 | 980 | 956 | 1012 | 1150 | 5163 | 14682 |
| 6 | West Germany | Walter Esser | 1000 | 840 | 824 | 1080 | 1093 | 4837 | 14682 |
| 6 | West Germany | Hole Rößler | 945 | 700 | 846 | 1140 | 1051 | 4682 | 14682 |
| 7 | France | Michel Gueguen | 1100 | 840 | 846 | 1152 | 1126 | 5064 | 14559 |
| 7 | France | Jean-Pierre Giudicelli | 960 | 700 | 868 | 1084 | 1237 | 4849 | 14559 |
| 7 | France | Raoul Gueguen | 930 | 780 | 824 | 1016 | 1096 | 4646 | 14559 |
| 8 | Poland | Ryszard Wach | 1100 | 700 | 956 | 1076 | 1126 | 4958 | 14785 |
| 8 | Poland | Janusz Pyciak-Peciak | 1070 | 920 | 560 | 1060 | 1222 | 4832 | 14785 |
| 8 | Poland | Stanislaw Skwira | 785 | 800 | 846 | 1160 | 904 | 4495 | 14785 |
| 9 | Great Britain | Jeremy Robert Fox | 1100 | 1000 | 868 | 1024 | 1300 | 5292 | 14257 |
| 9 | Great Britain | Barry Lillywhite | 1070 | 840 | 582 | 1052 | 994 | 4538 | 14257 |
| 9 | Great Britain | Robert Lawson Phelps | 955 | 700 | 736 | 1000 | 1036 | 4427 | 14257 |
| 10 | Italy | Mario Medda | 895 | 740 | 1088 | 1040 | 1087 | 4850 | 13913 |
| 10 | Italy | Giovanni Perugini | 1065 | 800 | 736 | 1024 | 946 | 4571 | 13913 |
| 10 | Italy | Nicolo Deligia | 1055 | 720 | 736 | 912 | 1069 | 4492 | 13913 |
| 11 | Austria | Wolfgang Leu | 1085 | 840 | 934 | 1012 | 973 | 4844 | 13865 |
| 11 | Austria | Peter Zobl-Wessely | 880 | 800 | 846 | 908 | 1120 | 4554 | 13865 |
| 11 | Austria | Bruno Jerebicnik | 835 | 900 | 824 | 908 | 1000 | 4467 | 13865 |
| 12 | Romania | Dumitru Spirlea | 975 | 840 | 1022 | 932 | 1015 | 4784 | 13655 |
| 12 | Romania | Marian Cosmescu | 1045 | 660 | 824 | 996 | 967 | 4492 | 13655 |
| 12 | Romania | Albert Covacs | 815 | 580 | 714 | 1204 | 1066 | 4379 | 13655 |
| 13 | Japan | Masaru Sakano | 1050 | 560 | 846 | 972 | 1177 | 4605 | 13569 |
| 13 | Japan | Yuso Makihira | 1005 | 760 | 736 | 876 | 1213 | 4590 | 13569 |
| 13 | Japan | Akira Kubo | 860 | 680 | 912 | 880 | 1042 | 4374 | 13569 |
| 14 | Denmark | Jørn Steffensen | 1005 | 780 | 934 | 1028 | 1129 | 4876 | 13547 |
| 14 | Denmark | Klaus Petersen | 990 | 760 | 692 | 1108 | 949 | 4499 | 13547 |
| 14 | Denmark | Heitmann René | 910 | 640 | 626 | 1008 | 988 | 4172 | 13547 |
| 15 | Switzerland | Urs Hugi | 1075 | 940 | 846 | 952 | 826 | 4639 | 13359 |
| 15 | Switzerland | Hans Müller | 965 | 700 | 846 | 948 | 937 | 4396 | 13359 |
| 15 | Switzerland | Beat Ganz | 1030 | 640 | 670 | 888 | 1096 | 4324 | 13359 |
| 16 | Bulgaria | Georgi Stoyanov | 1100 | 700 | 890 | 944 | 1027 | 4661 | 12957 |
| 16 | Bulgaria | Velko Bratanov | 785 | 640 | 956 | 916 | 1024 | 4321 | 12957 |
| 16 | Bulgaria | Angel Pepeliankov | 1060 | 700 | 0 | 1080 | 1135 | 3975 | 12957 |
| 17 | Mexico | Gilberto Toledano Sanchez | 1090 | 780 | 670 | 908 | 988 | 4436 | 12901 |
| 17 | Mexico | Eduardo Olivera Lastra | 960 | 740 | 868 | 1020 | 844 | 4432 | 12901 |
| 17 | Mexico | Juan José Castilla Ramos | 935 | 620 | 714 | 752 | 1012 | 4033 | 12901 |
| 18 | Netherlands | Jan Bekkenk | 930 | 700 | 692 | 1008 | 1084 | 4414 | 12340 |
| 18 | Netherlands | Rob Vonk | 870 | 480 | 692 | 1208 | 877 | 4127 | 12340 |
| 18 | Netherlands | Henk Krediet | 985 | 880 | 802 | 0 | 1132 | 3799 | 12340 |
| 19 | Canada | Scott Scheuermann | 1005 | 420 | 824 | 1044 | 769 | 4062 | 11335 |
| 19 | Canada | Kenneth Maaten | 880 | 540 | 780 | 792 | 991 | 3983 | 11335 |
| 19 | Canada | George Skene | 0 | 480 | 714 | 1108 | 988 | 3290 | 11335 |
