= Modern pentathlon at the 1964 Summer Olympics – Men's individual =

Men's individual modern pentathlon at the Games of the XVIII Olympiad
- Dates: October 11–15
- Competitors: 37 from 14 nations

Medalists
1st place, gold medalist(s)		Ferenc Török	Hungary
2nd place, silver medalist(s)		Igor Novikov	Soviet Union
3rd place, bronze medalist(s)		Albert Mokeev	Soviet Union

The individual competition was a modern pentathlon event held as part of the Modern pentathlon at the 1964 Summer Olympics programme. One segment of the pentathlon was held each day, from 11 October to 15 October 1964.

== Medalists ==
Gold	Silver	Bronze
Ferenc Török; Hungary	Igor Novikov; Soviet Union	Albert Mokeev; Soviet Union

== Results ==
=== Equestrian ===
Event 1
Place	Pentathlete	Time	Penalty	Score
1.	E. M. Flores (MEX)	2:39.6	0	1100
2.	Rudolf Trost (AUT)	2:49.6	0	1100
3.	Bo Jansson (SWE)	2:58.5	0	1100
4.	Aquiles Gloffka (CHI)	3:03.5	0	1100
5.	Udo Birnbaum (AUT)	3:09.8	0	1100
6.	David Kirkwood (USA)	3:13.7	0	1100
7.	Rolf Junefelt (SWE)	3:14.8	0	1100
8.	Wolfgang Goedicke (EUA)	3:16.7	0	1100
9.	Donald McMiken (AUS)	3:17.1	0	1100
10.	Fukutome Yoshihide (JPN)	3:31.4	0	1100
11.	D. R. Rios (MEX)	2:34.3	30	1070
12.	Herbert Polzhuber (AUT)	3:39.7	30	1070
13.	Benjamin Finnis (GBR)	2:45.3	30	1070
14.	Enrique Padilla (MEX)	2:45.8	30	1070
15.	Ferenc Török (HUN)	2:52.2	30	1070
16.	James Moore (USA)	3:03.5	30	1070
17.	Robert Phelps (GBR)	3:14.7	30	1070
18.	Paul Pesthy (USA)	3:14.7	30	1070
19.	Peter Macken (AUS)	3:19.8	30	1070
20.	Uwe Adler (EUA)	3:20.8	30	1070
21.	Uchino Shigeaki (JPN)	3:24.3	30	1070
22.	Jorma Hotanen (FIN)	2:46.2	60	1040
23.	Keijo Vanhala (FIN)	2:47.4	60	1040
24.	Victor Mineev (URS)	2:54.4	60	1040
25.	Kari Kaaja (FIN)	2:56.4	60	1040
26.	Igor Novikov (URS)	2:59.9	60	1040
27.	Ottó Török (HUN)	3:13.7	60	1040
28.	Mino Shigeki (JPN)	3:16.2	60	1040
29.	Hans-Gunnar Liljenwall (SWE)	3:18.7	60	1040
30.	Imre Nagy (HUN)	3:20.7	60	1040
31.	Duncan Page (AUS)	3:32.8	60	1040
32.	Jeremy Fox (GBR)	3:10.0	90	1010
33.	Albert Mokeev (URS)	2:54.4	130	970
34.	Elmar Frings (EUA)	3:32.7	140	960
35.	Choi Kui Seung (KOR)	2:50.4	150	950
36.	Jose Pereira (BRA)	3:16.9	160	940
37.	Alfonso Ottaviani (ITA)	3:23.4	160	940

=== Fencing ===
Ferenc Török was the most successful fencer, with a record of 27-9 propelling him to the 1000 points awarded to the best record. Other fencers lost 36 points from that 1000 for each loss beyond 9.

Event 2
Place	Pentathlete	Wins	Losses	Score
1.	Ferenc Török (HUN)	27	9	1000
2.	Imre Nagy (HUN)	24	12	892
3.	Rudolf Trost (AUT)	24	12	892
4.	Alfonso Ottaviani (ITA)	23	13	856
5.	Igor Novikov (URS)	23	13	856
6.	Ottó Török (HUN)	22	14	820
7.	Paul Pesthy (USA)	22	14	820
8.	Robert Phelps (GBR)	22	14	820
9.	Victor Mineev (URS)	22	14	820
10.	Herbert Polzhuber (AUT)	21	15	784
11.	Keijo Vanhala (FIN)	21	15	784
12.	Hans-Gunnar Liljenwall (SWE)	21	15	784
13.	David Kirkwood (USA)	21	15	784
14.	Udo Birnbaum (AUT)	20	16	748
15.	Albert Mokeev (URS)	20	16	748
16.	Bo Jansson (SWE)	20	16	748
17.	Kari Kaaja (FIN)	19	17	712
18.	Wolfgang Goedicke (EUA)	19	17	712
19.	Jorma Hotanen (FIN)	18	18	676
20.	James Moore (USA)	18	18	676
21.	Peter Macken (AUS)	17	19	640
22.	Jose Pereira (BRA)	17	19	640
23.	Elmar Frings (EUA)	17	19	640
24.	E. M. Flores (MEX)	16	20	604
25.	Benjamin Finnis (GBR)	16	20	604
26.	Mino Shigeki (JPN)	16	20	604
27.	Donald McMiken (AUS)	16	20	604
28.	Duncan Page (AUS)	15	21	568
29.	Rolf Junefelt (SWE)	15	21	568
30.	Uwe Adler (EUA)	14	22	532
31.	Aquiles Gloffka (CHI)	14	22	532
32.	Uchino Shigeaki (JPN)	13	23	496
33.	Enrique Padilla (MEX)	12	24	460
34.	Fukutome Yoshihide (JPN)	11	25	424
35.	Choi Kui Seung (KOR)	10	26	388
36.	Jeremy Fox (GBR)	7	29	280
37.	D. R. Rios (MEX)	5	31	208

After 2 events
Place	Pentathlete	Riding	Fencing	Total
1.	Ferenc Török (HUN)	1070	1000	2070
2.	Rudolf Trost (AUT)	1100	892	1992
3.	Imre Nagy (HUN)	1040	892	1932
4.	Igor Novikov (URS)	1040	856	1896
5.	Paul Pesthy (USA)	1070	820	1890
5.	Robert Phelps (GBR)	1070	820	1890
7.	David Kirkwood (USA)	1100	784	1884
8.	Ottó Török (HUN)	1040	820	1860
8.	Victor Mineev (URS)	1040	820	1860
10.	Herbert Polzhuber (AUT)	1070	784	1854
11.	Bo Jansson (SWE)	1100	748	1848
11.	Udo Birnbaum (AUT)	1100	748	1848
13.	Hans-Gunnar Liljenwall (SWE)	1040	784	1824
13.	Keijo Vanhala (FIN)	1040	784	1824
15.	Wolfgang Goedicke (EUA)	1100	712	1812
16.	Alfonso Ottaviani (ITA)	940	856	1796
17.	Kari Kaaja (FIN)	1040	712	1752
18.	James Moore (USA)	1070	676	1746
19.	Albert Mokeev (URS)	970	748	1718
20.	Jorma Hotanen (FIN)	1040	676	1716
21.	Peter Macken (AUS)	1070	640	1710
22.	Donald McMiken (AUS)	1100	604	1704
22.	E. M. Flores (MEX)	1100	604	1704
24.	Benjamin Finnis (GBR)	1070	604	1674
25.	Rolf Junefelt (SWE)	1100	568	1668
26.	Mino Shigeki (JPN)	1040	604	1644
27.	Aquiles Gloffka (CHI)	1100	532	1632
28.	Duncan Page (AUS)	1040	568	1608
29.	Uwe Adler (EUA)	1070	532	1602
30.	Elmar Frings (EUA)	960	640	1600
31.	Jose Pereira (BRA)	940	640	1580
32.	Uchino Shigeaki (JPN)	1070	496	1566
33.	Enrique Padilla (MEX)	1070	460	1530
34.	Fukutome Yoshihide (JPN)	1100	424	1524
35.	Choi Kui Seung (KOR)	950	388	1338
36.	Jeremy Fox (GBR)	1010	280	1290
37.	D. R. Rios (MEX)	1070	208	1278

=== Shooting ===
Event 3
Place	Pentathlete	Points	Score
1.	Albert Mokeev (URS)	198	1060
2.	Uwe Adler (EUA)	196	1020
3.	Igor Novikov (URS)	196	1020
4.	Peter Macken (AUS)	196	1020
5.	Fukutome Yoshihide (JPN)	196	1020
6.	Uchino Shigeaki (JPN)	196	1020
7.	Donald McMiken (AUS)	195	1000
8.	Benjamin Finnis (GBR)	194	980
9.	Imre Nagy (HUN)	193	960
10.	Ferenc Török (HUN)	193	960
11.	Rolf Junefelt (SWE)	193	960
12.	James Moore (USA)	193	960
13.	Victor Mineev (URS)	193	960
14.	Elmar Frings (EUA)	192	940
15.	Udo Birnbaum (AUT)	192	940
16.	Jose Pereira (BRA)	192	940
17.	David Kirkwood (USA)	191	920
18.	Kari Kaaja (FIN)	190	900
19.	D. R. Rios (MEX)	188	860
20.	Duncan Page (AUS)	188	860
21.	Keijo Vanhala (FIN)	188	860
22.	Wolfgang Goedicke (EUA)	187	840
23.	Alfonso Ottaviani (ITA)	187	840
24.	Mino Shigeki (JPN)	186	820
25.	Jeremy Fox (GBR)	185	800
26.	Jorma Hotanen (FIN)	185	800
27.	Aquiles Gloffka (CHI)	184	780
28.	Bo Jansson (SWE)	184	780
29.	Paul Pesthy (USA)	183	760
30.	Robert Phelps (GBR)	181	720
31.	Hans-Gunnar Liljenwall (SWE)	181	720
32.	Herbert Polzhuber (AUT)	180	700
33.	Enrique Padilla (MEX)	177	640
34.	Choi Kui Seung (KOR)	177	640
35.	Rudolf Trost (AUT)	176	620
36.	E. M. Flores (MEX)	172	540
37.	Ottó Török (HUN)	168	460

After 3 events
Place	Pentathlete	Riding	Fencing	Shooting	Total
1.	Ferenc Török (HUN)	1070	1000	960	3030
2.	Igor Novikov (URS)	1040	856	1020	2916
3.	Imre Nagy (HUN)	1040	892	960	2892
4.	Victor Mineev (URS)	1040	820	960	2820
5.	David Kirkwood (USA)	1100	784	920	2804
6.	Udo Birnbaum (AUT)	1100	748	940	2788
7.	Albert Mokeev (URS)	970	748	1060	2778
8.	Peter Macken (AUS)	1070	640	1020	2730
9.	James Moore (USA)	1070	676	960	2706
10.	Donald McMiken (AUS)	1100	604	1000	2704
11.	Keijo Vanhala (FIN)	1040	784	860	2684
12.	Benjamin Finnis (GBR)	1070	604	980	2654
13.	Kari Kaaja (FIN)	1040	712	900	2652
13.	Wolfgang Goedicke (EUA)	1100	712	840	2652
15.	Paul Pesthy (USA)	1070	820	760	2650
16.	Alfonso Ottaviani (ITA)	940	856	840	2636
17.	Rolf Junefelt (SWE)	1100	568	960	2628
17.	Bo Jansson (SWE)	1100	748	780	2628
19.	Uwe Adler (EUA)	1070	532	1020	2622
20.	Rudolf Trost (AUT)	1100	892	620	2612
21.	Robert Phelps (GBR)	1070	820	720	2610
22.	Uchino Shigeaki (JPN)	1070	496	1020	2586
23.	Herbert Polzhuber (AUT)	1070	784	700	2554
24.	Fukutome Yoshihide (JPN)	1100	424	1020	2544
24.	Hans-Gunnar Liljenwall (SWE)	1040	784	720	2544
26.	Elmar Frings (EUA)	960	640	940	2540
27.	Jose Pereira (BRA)	940	640	940	2520
28.	Jorma Hotanen (FIN)	1040	676	800	2516
29.	Duncan Page (AUS)	1040	568	860	2468
30.	Mino Shigeki (JPN)	1040	604	820	2464
31.	Aquiles Gloffka (CHI)	1100	532	780	2412
32.	Ottó Török (HUN)	1040	820	460	2320
33.	E. M. Flores (MEX)	1100	604	540	2244
34.	Enrique Padilla (MEX)	1070	460	640	2170
35.	D. R. Rios (MEX)	1070	208	860	2138
36.	Jeremy Fox (GBR)	1010	280	800	2090
37.	Choi Kui Seung (KOR)	950	388	640	1978

=== Swimming ===
Event 4
Place	Pentathlete	Time	Score
1.	Bo Jansson (SWE)	3:45.2	1075
2.	Rolf Junefelt (SWE)	3:46.2	1070
3.	Hans-Gunnar Liljenwall (SWE)	3:49.2	1055
4.	Jeremy Fox (GBR)	3:49.5	1055
5.	Igor Novikov (URS)	3:49.5	1055
6.	Victor Mineev (URS)	3:50.1	1050
7.	Albert Mokeev (URS)	3:51.0	1045
8.	Peter Macken (AUS)	3:53.1	1035
9.	Keijo Vanhala (FIN)	3:53.9	1035
10.	Jose Pereira (BRA)	3:55.9	1025
11.	Uchino Shigeaki (JPN)	3:57.4	1015
12.	Uwe Adler (EUA)	3:59.5	1005
13.	Robert Phelps (GBR)	3:59.7	1005
14.	Duncan Page (AUS)	4:01.7	995
15.	James Moore (USA)	4:02.4	990
16.	Ottó Török (HUN)	4:03.0	985
17.	Aquiles Gloffka (CHI)	4:04.3	980
18.	Paul Pesthy (USA)	4:04.9	980
19.	Wolfgang Goedicke (EUA)	4:05.1	975
20.	Elmar Frings (EUA)	4:05.3	975
21.	Benjamin Finnis (GBR)	4:06.4	970
22.	Donald McMiken (AUS)	4:08.1	960
23.	Ferenc Török (HUN)	4:08.3	960
24.	D. R. Rios (MEX)	4:10.3	950
25.	Fukutome Yoshihide (JPN)	4:10.4	950
26.	Kari Kaaja (FIN)	4:11.1	945
27.	David Kirkwood (USA)	4:11.5	945
28.	Imre Nagy (HUN)	4:12.7	940
29.	Alfonso Ottaviani (ITA)	4:15.2	925
30.	Jorma Hotanen (FIN)	4:19.6	905
31.	Mino Shigeki (JPN)	4:20.1	900
32.	Rudolf Trost (AUT)	4:30.9	850
33.	E. M. Flores (MEX)	4:31.2	845
34.	Udo Birnbaum (AUT)	4:32.5	840
35.	Herbert Polzhuber (AUT)	4:33.2	835
36.	Enrique Padilla (MEX)	4:49.5	755
37.	Choi Kui Seung (KOR)	5:16.9	620

After 4 events
Place	Pentathlete	Riding	Fencing	Shooting	Swimming	Total
1.	Ferenc Török (HUN)	1070	1000	960	960	3990
2.	Igor Novikov (URS)	1040	856	1020	1055	3971
3.	Victor Mineev (URS)	1040	820	960	1050	3870
4.	Imre Nagy (HUN)	1040	892	960	940	3832
5.	Albert Mokeev (URS)	970	748	1060	1045	3823
6.	Peter Macken (AUS)	1070	640	1020	1035	3765
7.	David Kirkwood (USA)	1100	784	920	945	3749
8.	Keijo Vanhala (FIN)	1040	784	860	1035	3719
9.	Bo Jansson (SWE)	1100	748	780	1075	3703
10.	Rolf Junefelt (SWE)	1100	568	960	1070	3698
11.	James Moore (USA)	1070	676	960	990	3696
12.	Donald McMiken (AUS)	1100	604	1000	960	3664
13.	Paul Pesthy (USA)	1070	820	760	980	3630
14.	Udo Birnbaum (AUT)	1100	748	940	840	3628
15.	Uwe Adler (EUA)	1070	532	1020	1005	3627
15.	Wolfgang Goedicke (EUA)	1100	712	840	975	3627
17.	Benjamin Finnis (GBR)	1070	604	980	970	3624
18.	Robert Phelps (GBR)	1070	820	720	1005	3615
19.	Uchino Shigeaki (JPN)	1070	496	1020	1015	3601
20.	Hans-Gunnar Liljenwall (SWE)	1040	784	720	1055	3599
21.	Kari Kaaja (FIN)	1040	712	900	945	3597
22.	Alfonso Ottaviani (ITA)	940	856	840	925	3561
23.	Jose Pereira (BRA)	940	640	940	1025	3545
24.	Elmar Frings (EUA)	960	640	940	975	3515
25.	Fukutome Yoshihide (JPN)	1100	424	1020	950	3494
26.	Duncan Page (AUS)	1040	568	860	995	3463
27.	Rudolf Trost (AUT)	1100	892	620	850	3462
28.	Jorma Hotanen (FIN)	1040	676	800	905	3421
29.	Aquiles Gloffka (CHI)	1100	532	780	980	3392
30.	Herbert Polzhuber (AUT)	1070	784	700	835	3389
31.	Mino Shigeki (JPN)	1040	604	820	900	3364
32.	Ottó Török (HUN)	1040	820	460	985	3305
33.	Jeremy Fox (GBR)	1010	280	800	1055	3145
34.	E. M. Flores (MEX)	1100	604	540	845	3089
35.	D. R. Rios (MEX)	1070	208	860	950	3088
36.	Enrique Padilla (MEX)	1070	460	640	755	2925
37.	Choi Kui Seung (KOR)	950	388	640	620	2598

=== Running ===
Event 5
Place	Pentathlete	Time	Score
1.	Albert Mokeev (URS)	13:48.0	1216
2.	James Moore (USA)	13:55.0	1195
3.	Peter Macken (AUS)	14:16.6	1132
4.	Jeremy Fox (GBR)	14:17.2	1129
5.	Ferenc Török (HUN)	14:18.7	1126
6.	Igor Novikov (URS)	14:28.4	1096
7.	Fukutome Yoshihide (JPN)	14:29.4	1093
8.	Alfonso Ottaviani (ITA)	14:30.8	1090
9.	Hans-Gunnar Liljenwall (SWE)	14:38.6	1066
10.	Bo Jansson (SWE)	14:41.8	1057
11.	Imre Nagy (HUN)	14:46.8	1042
12.	Jorma Hotanen (FIN)	14:49.8	1033
13.	Wolfgang Goedicke (EUA)	14:50.2	1030
14.	Uwe Adler (EUA)	14:51.2	1027
15.	Victor Mineev (URS)	14:52.4	1024
16.	Uchino Shigeaki (JPN)	14:54.2	1018
17.	Ottó Török (HUN)	15:00.0	1000
18.	Rolf Junefelt (SWE)	15:08.2	976
19.	David Kirkwood (USA)	15:09.7	973
20.	Paul Pesthy (USA)	15:12.1	964
21.	Elmar Frings (EUA)	15:24.1	928
22.	Kari Kaaja (FIN)	15:32.5	904
23.	Donald McMiken (AUS)	15:34.2	898
24.	D. R. Rios (MEX)	15:38.3	886
25.	Benjamin Finnis (GBR)	15:44.6	868
26.	Enrique Padilla (MEX)	15:55.4	835
27.	Mino Shigeki (JPN)	15:56.9	832
28.	Duncan Page (AUS)	15:59.9	823
29.	Keijo Vanhala (FIN)	16:01.9	817
30.	E. M. Flores (MEX)	16:07.9	799
31.	Udo Birnbaum (AUT)	16:08.9	796
32.	Robert Phelps (GBR)	16:11.2	787
33.	Jose Pereira (BRA)	16:29.1	733
34.	Aquiles Gloffka (CHI)	16:35.9	715
35.	Herbert Polzhuber (AUT)	16:54.9	658
36.	Rudolf Trost (AUT)	17:01.2	637
37.	Choi Kui Seung (KOR)	19:23.6	211

Final standings
Place	Pentathlete	Riding	Fencing	Shooting	Swimming	Running	Total
Gold	Ferenc Török (HUN)	1070	1000	960	960	1126	5116
Silver	Igor Novikov (URS)	1040	856	1020	1055	1096	5067
Bronze	Albert Mokeev (URS)	970	748	1060	1045	1216	5039
4.	Peter Macken (AUS)	1070	640	1020	1035	1132	4897
5.	Victor Mineev (URS)	1040	820	960	1050	1024	4894
6.	James Moore (USA)	1070	676	960	990	1195	4891
7.	Imre Nagy (HUN)	1040	892	960	940	1042	4874
8.	Bo Jansson (SWE)	1100	748	780	1075	1057	4760
9.	David Kirkwood (USA)	1100	784	920	945	973	4722
10.	Rolf Junefelt (SWE)	1100	568	960	1070	976	4674
11.	Hans-Gunnar Liljenwall (SWE)	1040	784	720	1055	1066	4665
12.	Wolfgang Goedicke (EUA)	1100	712	840	975	1030	4657
13.	Uwe Adler (EUA)	1070	532	1020	1005	1027	4654
14.	Alfonso Ottaviani (ITA)	940	856	840	925	1090	4651
15.	Uchino Shigeaki (JPN)	1070	496	1020	1015	1018	4619
16.	Paul Pesthy (USA)	1070	820	760	980	964	4594
17.	Fukutome Yoshihide (JPN)	1100	424	1020	950	1093	4587
18.	Donald McMiken (AUS)	1100	604	1000	960	898	4562
19.	Keijo Vanhala (FIN)	1040	784	860	1035	817	4536
20.	Kari Kaaja (FIN)	1040	712	900	945	904	4501
21.	Benjamin Finnis (GBR)	1070	604	980	970	868	4492
22.	Jorma Hotanen (FIN)	1040	676	800	905	1033	4454
23.	Elmar Frings (EUA)	960	640	940	975	928	4443
24.	Udo Birnbaum (AUT)	1100	748	940	840	796	4424
25.	Robert Phelps (GBR)	1070	820	720	1005	787	4402
26.	Ottó Török (HUN)	1040	820	460	985	1000	4305
27.	Duncan Page (AUS)	1040	568	860	995	823	4286
28.	Jose Pereira (BRA)	940	640	940	1025	733	4278
29.	Jeremy Fox (GBR)	1010	280	800	1055	1129	4274
30.	Mino Shigeki (JPN)	1040	604	820	900	832	4196
31.	Aquiles Gloffka (CHI)	1100	532	780	980	715	4107
32.	Rudolf Trost (AUT)	1100	892	620	850	637	4099
33.	Herbert Polzhuber (AUT)	1070	784	700	835	658	4047
34.	D. R. Rios (MEX)	1070	208	860	950	886	3974
35.	E. M. Flores (MEX)	1100	604	540	845	799	3888
36.	Enrique Padilla (MEX)	1070	460	640	755	835	3760
37.	Choi Kui Seung (KOR)	950	388	640	620	211	2809

== Sources ==
- Tokyo Organizing Committee (1964). The Games of the XVIII Olympiad: Tokyo 1964, vol. 2.
