= Modern pentathlon at the 1964 Summer Olympics =

Men's modern pentathlon at the Games of the XVIII Olympiad
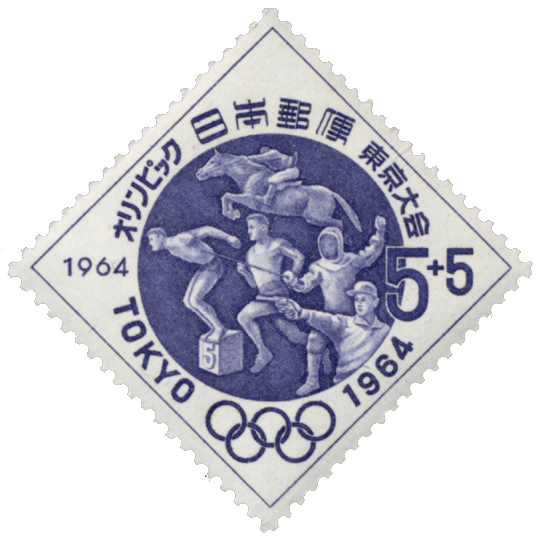
- Modern pentathlon at the 1964 Summer Olympics on a stamp of Japan
- Dates: October 11–15, 1964
- Competitors: 37 from 15 nations

Medalists
1st place, gold medalist(s)		Ferenc Török	Hungary
2nd place, silver medalist(s)		Igor Novikov	Soviet Union
3rd place, bronze medalist(s)		Albert Mokeev	Soviet Union

The modern pentathlon at the 1964 Summer Olympics was represented by two events (both for men): Individual competition and Team competition. As usual in Olympic modern pentathlon, one competition was held and each competitor's score was included to the Individual competition event results table and was also added to his teammates' scores to be included to the Team competition event results table. This competition consisted of 5 disciplines:

- Equestrian, held on October 11 at Asaka Nezu Park.
- Fencing, held on October 12 at Waseda Memorial Hall.
- Shooting, held on October 13 at Asaka Shooting Range.
- Swimming, held on October 14 at National Gymnasium.
- Cross-country, held on October 15 at Kemigawa.

== Medal table ==
Rank	Nation	Gold	Silver	Bronze	Total
1	Soviet Union	1	1	1	3
2	Hungary	1	0	1	2
3	United States	0	1	0	1
Totals (3 entries)		2	2	2	6

== Medal summary ==
Event	Gold	Silver	Bronze
Individual	Ferenc Török; Hungary	Igor Novikov; Soviet Union	Albert Mokeev; Soviet Union
Team	Soviet Union; Albert Mokeev; Igor Novikov; Viktor Mineev	United States; James Moore; David Kirkwood; Paul Pesthy	Hungary; Ferenc Török; Imre Nagy; Ottó Török

== Participating nations ==
A total of 37 athletes from 15 nations competed at the Tokyo Games:

- Australia (3)
- Austria (3)
- Brazil (1)
- Chile (1)
- Finland (3)
- United Team of Germany (3)
- Great Britain (3)
- Hungary (3)
- Italy (1)
- Japan (3)
- Mexico (3)
- South Korea (1)
- Soviet Union (3)
- Sweden (3)
- United States (3)

== Events ==
=== Individual competition ===
Rank	Athlete	Rid.	Fen.	Sho.	Swi.	Run.	Score
1	Ferenc Török (HUN)	1070	1000	960	960	1126	5116
2	Igor Novikov (URS)	1040	865	1020	1055	1096	5067
3	Albert Mokeev (URS)	970	748	1060	1045	1216	5039
4	Peter Macken (AUS)	1070	640	1020	1035	1132	4897
5	Viktor Mineev (URS)	1040	820	960	1050	1024	4894
6	James Moore (USA)	1070	676	960	990	1195	4891
7	Imre Nagy (HUN)	1040	892	960	940	1042	4874
8	Bo Herman Jansson (SWE)	1100	748	780	1075	1057	4760
9	David Kirkwood (USA)	1100	784	920	945	973	4722
10	Rolf Ingmar Junefelt (SWE)	1100	568	960	1070	976	4674
11	Hans-Gunnar Liljenvall (SWE)	1040	784	720	1055	1066	4665
12	Wolfgang Goedicke (EUA)	1100	712	840	975	1030	4657
13	Uwe Adler (EUA)	1070	532	1020	1005	1027	4654
14	Alfonso Ottaviani (ITA)	940	856	840	925	1090	4651
15	Shigeaki Uchino (JPN)	1070	496	1020	1015	1018	4619
16	Paul Pesthy (USA)	1070	820	760	980	964	4594
17	Yoshihide Fukutome (JPN)	1100	424	1020	950	1093	4587
18	Donald McMiken (AUS)	1100	604	1000	960	898	4562
19	Keijo K. V. Vanhala (FIN)	1040	784	860	1035	817	4536
20	Kari Juhani Kaaja (FIN)	1040	712	900	945	904	4501
21	Benjamin Finnis (GBR)	1070	604	980	970	868	4492
22	Jorma Olavi Hotanen (FIN)	1040	676	800	905	1033	4454
23	Elmar Frings (EUA)	960	640	940	975	928	4443
24	Udo Birnbaum (AUT)	1100	748	940	840	796	4424
25	Robert Lawson Phelps (GBR)	1070	820	720	1005	787	4402
26	Ottó Török (HUN)	1040	820	460	985	1000	4305
27	Duncan Page (AUS)	1040	568	860	995	823	4286
28	José Wilson Pereira (BRA)	940	640	940	1025	733	4278
29	Jeremy Robert Fox (GBR)	1010	280	800	1055	1129	4274
30	Shigeki Mino (JPN)	1040	604	820	900	832	4195
31	Aquiles Gloffka (CHI)	1100	532	780	980	715	4107
32	Rudolf Trost (AUT)	1100	892	620	850	637	4099
33	Herbert Polzhuber (AUT)	1070	784	700	835	658	4047
34	D.R. Rios (MEX)	1070	208	860	950	886	3974
35	E.M. Flores (MEX)	1100	604	540	845	799	3888
36	Enrique Padilla (MEX)	1070	460	640	755	835	3760
37	Choi Kui Seung (KOR)	950	388	640	620	211	2809

=== Team competition ===
Rank	Nation	Athletes	Rid.	Fen.	Swi.	Sho.	Run.	Score	Team Score
1	Soviet Union	Albert Mokeev	970	748	1060	1045	1216	5039	14961
1	Soviet Union	Igor Novikov	1040	865	1020	1055	1096	5067	14961
1	Soviet Union	Viktor Mineev	1040	820	960	1050	1024	4894	14961
2	United States	James Moore	1070	676	960	990	1195	4891	14189
2	United States	David Kirkwood	1100	784	920	945	973	4722	14189
2	United States	Paul Pesthy	1070	820	760	980	964	4594	14189
3	Hungary	Ferenc Török	1070	1000	960	960	1126	5116	14173
3	Hungary	Imre Nagy	1040	892	960	940	1042	4874	14173
3	Hungary	Ottó Török	1040	820	460	985	1000	4305	14173
4	Sweden	Bo Herman Jansson	1100	748	780	1075	1057	4760	14056
4	Sweden	Rolf Ingmar Junefelt	1100	568	960	1070	976	4674	14056
4	Sweden	Hans-Gunnar Liljenvall	1040	784	720	1055	1066	466	14056
5	Australia	Peter Neville Macken	1070	640	1020	1035	1132	4897	13703
5	Australia	Donald Fraser McMiken	1100	604	1000	960	898	4562	13703
5	Australia	Duncan Page	1040	568	860	995	823	4286	13703
6	United Team of Germany	Wolfgang Goedicke	1100	712	840	975	1030	4657	13599
6	United Team of Germany	Uwe Adler	1070	532	1020	1005	1027	4654	13599
6	United Team of Germany	Elmar Frings	960	640	940	975	928	4443	13599
7	Finland	Keijo K. V. Vanhala	1040	784	860	1035	817	4536	13540
7	Finland	Kari Juhani Kaaja	1040	712	900	945	904	4501	13540
7	Finland	Jorma Olavi Hotanen	1040	676	800	905	1033	4454	13540
8	Japan	Shigeaki Uchino	1070	496	1020	1015	1018	4619	13402
8	Japan	Yoshihide Fukutome	1100	424	1020	950	1093	4587	13402
8	Japan	Shigeki Mino	1040	604	820	900	832	4195	13402
9	Great Britain	Benjamin Finnis	1070	604	980	970	868	4492	13152
9	Great Britain	Robert Lawson Phelps	1070	820	720	1005	787	4402	13152
9	Great Britain	Jeremy Robert Fox	1010	280	800	1055	1129	4274	13152
10	Austria	Udo Birnbaum	1100	748	940	840	796	4424	12613
10	Austria	Rudolf Trost	1100	892	620	850	637	4099	12613
10	Austria	Herbert Polzhuber	1070	784	700	835	658	4047	12613
11	Mexico	D.R. Rios	1070	208	860	950	886	3974	11546
11	Mexico	E.M. Flores	1100	604	540	845	799	3888	11546
11	Mexico	Enrique Padilla	1070	460	640	755	835	3760	11546
