= Modern pentathlon at the 1968 Summer Olympics – Men's individual =

Men's individual modern pentathlon at the Games of the XIX Olympiad
- Venue: Campo Militar 1; Fernando Montes de Oca Fencing Hall; Alberca Olímpica Francisco Márquez; Vicente Suárez Shooting Range
- Dates: October 13–17
- Competitors: 48 from 18 nations

Medalists
| 1st place, gold medalist(s) | | Björn Ferm | Sweden |
| 2nd place, silver medalist(s) | | András Balczó | Hungary |
| 3rd place, bronze medalist(s) | | Pavel Lednev | Soviet Union |

The men's individual modern pentathlon event was a multi-sport combined event at the 1968 Summer Olympics. It was the 12th consecutive Games at which the event was held after being introduced in 1912. The competition involved riding, fencing, shooting, swimming, and running. The scores from the individual competition were also used for the team competition.

The event resulted in the first Olympic competitor being disqualified for doping. Hans-Gunnar Liljenwall was disqualified for alcohol use after drinking beer before the shooting phase.

== Results ==
| Rank | Pentathlete | Nation | Riding | Fencing | Shooting | Swimming | Running | Total |
|---|---|---|---|---|---|---|---|---|
| 1st place, gold medalist(s) | Björn Ferm | Sweden | 1100 | 885 | 934 | 1075 | 970 | 4964 |
| 2nd place, silver medalist(s) | András Balczó | Hungary | 1010 | 931 | 934 | 1054 | 1024 | 4953 |
| 3rd place, bronze medalist(s) | Pavel Lednev | Soviet Union | 1070 | 839 | 934 | 1060 | 892 | 4795 |
| 4 | Karl-Heinz Kutschke | East Germany | 1070 | 632 | 846 | 1126 | 1090 | 4764 |
| 5 | Boris Onishenko | Soviet Union | 995 | 885 | 912 | 1054 | 910 | 4756 |
| 6 | Raoul Gueguen | France | 1040 | 954 | 912 | 1000 | 850 | 4756 |
| 7 | Istvan Mona | Hungary | 1010 | 1046 | 868 | 943 | 847 | 4714 |
| 8 | Jim Fox | Great Britain | 1010 | 862 | 890 | 1006 | 895 | 4663 |
| 9 | Stasis Shaparnis | Soviet Union | 1070 | 793 | 802 | 1027 | 964 | 4656 |
| 10 | Mario Medda | Italy | 1010 | 977 | 758 | 949 | 937 | 4631 |
| 11 | James Moore | United States | 1040 | 793 | 912 | 931 | 937 | 4613 |
| 12 | Ferenc Török | Hungary | 920 | 1046 | 912 | 880 | 793 | 4551 |
| 13 | Jørn Steffensen | Denmark | 1040 | 862 | 934 | 811 | 898 | 4545 |
| 14 | Yuso Makihira | Japan | 1040 | 816 | 802 | 898 | 973 | 4529 |
| 15 | Jörg Tscherner | East Germany | 1050 | 793 | 846 | 1060 | 766 | 4515 |
| 16 | Hans Jacobson | Sweden | 1025 | 977 | 846 | 946 | 718 | 4512 |
| 17 | Elmar Frings | West Germany | 1070 | 839 | 846 | 955 | 796 | 4506 |
| 18 | Seppo Aho | Finland | 1100 | 885 | 692 | 940 | 880 | 4497 |
| 19 | Eduardo Olivera Lastra | Mexico | 1070 | 770 | 868 | 997 | 760 | 4474 |
| 20 | Martti Ketela | Finland | 1010 | 770 | 846 | 964 | 856 | 4446 |
| 21 | Lucien Guiguet | France | 1035 | 655 | 824 | 958 | 934 | 4406 |
| 22 | Robert Beck | United States | 1010 | 885 | 912 | 925 | 655 | 4387 |
| 23 | Wolf-Dieter Sonnleitner | Austria | 1010 | 701 | 912 | 916 | 832 | 4371 |
| 24 | Giancarlo Morresi | Italy | 790 | 793 | 1022 | 1051 | 703 | 4359 |
| 25 | David Bárcena Ríos | Mexico | 1010 | 517 | 890 | 982 | 952 | 4351 |
| 26 | Alex Tschui | Switzerland | 1100 | 770 | 1022 | 679 | 766 | 4337 |
| 27 | Katsuaki Tashiro | Japan | 1100 | 678 | 934 | 931 | 676 | 4319 |
| 28 | Siegfried Springer | Austria | 1030 | 816 | 846 | 883 | 718 | 4293 |
| 29 | Maurice Lough | United States | 980 | 655 | 846 | 988 | 820 | 4289 |
| 30 | Barry Lillywhite | Great Britain | 985 | 816 | 802 | 982 | 700 | 4285 |
| 31 | Peter Macken | Australia | 935 | 655 | 802 | 910 | 982 | 4284 |
| 32 | Heiner Thade | West Germany | 910 | 908 | 956 | 877 | 613 | 4264 |
| 33 | Antone Paniowsky | Bulgaria | 950 | 724 | 978 | 892 | 703 | 4247 |
| 34 | Jorma Hotanen | Finland | 780 | 839 | 846 | 895 | 871 | 4231 |
| 35 | Toshio Fukui | Japan | 840 | 896 | 692 | 967 | 802 | 4197 |
| 36 | Konstantine Sardjev | Bulgaria | 1100 | 655 | 868 | 757 | 811 | 4191 |
| 37 | Jean-Pierre Giudicelli | France | 780 | 494 | 890 | 973 | 925 | 4062 |
| 38 | Robert Phelps | Great Britain | 795 | 632 | 978 | 964 | 562 | 3931 |
| 39 | Duncan Page | Australia | 1035 | 563 | 846 | 880 | 580 | 3904 |
| 40 | Wolfgang Lüderitz | East Germany | 365 | 724 | 934 | 907 | 913 | 3843 |
| 41 | Pavel Kupka | Czechoslovakia | 865 | 839 | 670 | 943 | 502 | 3819 |
| 42 | Donald McMikin | Australia | 545 | 678 | 1022 | 835 | 679 | 3759 |
| 43 | Nicolo Deligia | Italy | 460 | 678 | 780 | 889 | 850 | 3657 |
| 44 | Eduardo Tovar Flores | Mexico | 805 | 540 | 648 | 889 | 730 | 3612 |
| 45 | Ivan Apostolov | Bulgaria | 720 | 609 | 538 | 880 | 715 | 3462 |
| 46 | Hans Todt | West Germany | 0 | 678 | 736 | 865 | 730 | 3009 |
| 47 | Wolfgang Leu | Austria | 980 | 747 | 670 | ELI | ELI | 2397 |
| – | Hans-Gunnar Liljenwall | Sweden | 1010 | 908 | DSQ | DSQ | DSQ | DSQ |

Hans Todt drew a stubborn horse for the riding element, which balked three times at an obstacle, resulting in Todt scoring 0 points. Todt, disconsolate at seeing his years of training gone to waste because of bad luck, attacked the horse and had to be pulled away by his teammates.
