= Finland at the 1964 Summer Olympics =

- IOC code: FIN
- NOC: Finnish Olympic Committee

in Tokyo
- Competitors: 89 (84 men and 5 women) in 13 sports
- Flag bearer: Eugen Ekman
- Medals Ranked 12th: Gold 3 Silver 0 Bronze 2 Total 5

Summer Olympics appearances (overview)
- 1908; 1912; 1920; 1924; 1928; 1932; 1936; 1948; 1952; 1956; 1960; 1964; 1968; 1972; 1976; 1980; 1984; 1988; 1992; 1996; 2000; 2004; 2008; 2012; 2016; 2020; 2024

Other related appearances
- 1906 Intercalated Games

Finland competed at the 1964 Summer Olympics in Tokyo, Japan. 89 competitors, 84 men and 5 women, took part in 64 events in 13 sports.

== Medalists ==
=== Gold ===
- Pauli Nevala — Athletics, Men's Javelin Throw
- Pentti Linnosvuo — Shooting, Rapid-Fire Pistol (Mixed)
- Väinö Markkanen — Shooting, Free Pistol (Mixed)

=== Bronze ===
- Pertti Purhonen — Boxing, Men's Welterweight
- Hannu Rantakari — Gymnastics, Men's Long Horse Vault

== Athletics ==
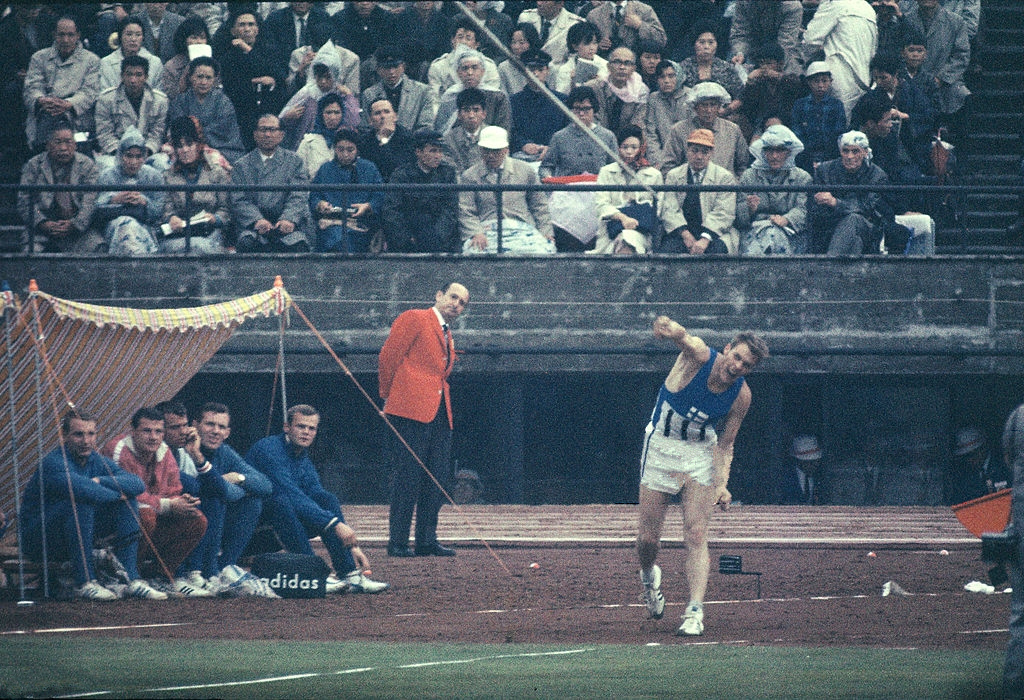
Pauli Nevala

== Basketball ==
Roster

- Jorma Pilkevaara
- Juha Harjula
- Kari Liimo
- Kauko Kauppinen
- Martti Liimo
- Pertti Laanti
- Raimo Lindholm
- Raimo Vartia
- Risto Kala
- Teijo Finneman
- Timo Lampén
- Uolevi Manninen

== Diving ==
Men

Athlete	Event	Preliminary		Final			
Athlete	Event	Points	Rank	Points	Rank	Total	Rank
Pentti Koskinen	3 m springboard	82.00	20	Did not advance			

== Modern pentathlon ==
Three male pentathletes represented Finland in 1964.

Individual

- Keijo Vanhala
- Kari Kaaja
- Jorma Hotanen

Team

- Keijo Vanhala
- Kari Kaaja
- Jorma Hotanen

== Shooting ==
Eight shooters represented Finland in 1964. Pentti Linnosvuo won gold in the 25 pistol and Väinö Markkanen won gold in the 50 pistol.

25 m pistol

- Pentti Linnosvuo
- Kalle Sievänen

50 m pistol

- Väinö Markkanen
- Immo Huhtinen

300 m rifle, three positions

- Esa Kervinen
- Antti Rissanen

50 m rifle, three positions

- Vilho Ylönen
- Esa Kervinen

50 m rifle, prone

- Antti Koskinen
- Vilho Ylönen

== Swimming ==
Men

Athlete	Event	Heat		Semifinal		Final	
Athlete	Event	Time	Rank	Time	Rank	Time	Rank
Tuomo Hämäläinen	100 m freestyle	57.6	46	Did not advance			
Matti Kasvio	100 m freestyle	56.3	=31	Did not advance			
Hannu Vaahtoranta	100 m freestyle	58.7	=33	Did not advance			
Tuomo Hämäläinen	400 m freestyle	4:35.5	34	—N/a		Did not advance	
Ilkka Suvanto	400 m freestyle	4:38.0	35	—N/a		Did not advance	
Esa Lepola	1500 m freestyle	18:33.4	27	—N/a		Did not advance	
Ilkka Suvanto	400 m individual medley	5:09.0	14	—N/a		Did not advance	
Hannu Vaahtoranta	400 m individual medley	5:16.2	23	—N/a		Did not advance	
Ilkka Suvanto; Hannu Vaahtoranta; Tuomo Hämäläinen; Matti Kasvio	4 × 200 m freestyle relay	8:23.3	10	—N/a		Did not advance	

Women

Athlete	Event	Heat		Semifinal		Final	
Athlete	Event	Time	Rank	Time	Rank	Time	Rank
Eila Pyrhönen	100 m butterfly	1:07.9	5 Q	1:07.9	6 Q	1:07.3	4
