= Modern pentathlon at the 1964 Summer Olympics – Men's team =

The team competition was a modern pentathlon event held as part of the Modern pentathlon at the 1964 Summer Olympics programme. The team scores were the sum of the three pentathletes' scores in the individual competition.

== Medalists ==
Gold	Silver	Bronze
Soviet Union	United States	Hungary

== Results ==
Place	Team	Riding	Fencing	Shooting	Swimming	Running	Total
Gold	Soviet Union	3050	2385	3040	3150	3336	14961
Silver	United States	3240	2262	2640	2915	3132	14189
Bronze	Hungary	3150	2590	2380	2885	3168	14173
4.	Sweden	3240	2057	2460	3200	3099	14056
5.	Australia	3210	1770	2880	2990	2853	13703
6.	United Team of Germany	3130	1729	2800	2955	2985	13599
7.	Finland	3120	2221	2560	2885	2754	13540
8.	Japan	3210	1524	2860	2865	2943	13402
9.	Great Britain	3150	1688	2500	3030	2784	13152
10.	Austria	3270	2467	2260	2525	2091	12613
11.	Mexico	3240	1196	2040	2550	2520	11546

== Sources ==
- Tokyo Organizing Committee (1964). The Games of the XVIII Olympiad: Tokyo 1964, vol. 2.
