= Herbert Polzhuber =

Austrian fencer and pentathlete (1938–2015)

Personal information
- Born: June 1938 Wien, German Reich (now Vienna, Austria)
- Died: 24 June 2015 (aged 77) Vienna, Austria
- Height: 183 cm (6 ft 0 in)
- Weight: 85 kg (187 lb)

Sport
- Sport: Fencing; modern pentathlon
- Club: HSV Wien
Medal record
Representing Austria
Fencing
World Military Championships
Gold medal – first place	1961 Breda	Épée individual
Silver medal – second place	1967 Palermo	Épée individual
Gold medal – first place	1970 Rome	Épée team
Gold medal – first place	1970 Rome	Épée individual

Herbert Polzhuber (June 1938 – 24 June 2015) was an Austrian fencer and modern pentathlete. Considered one of Austria's greatest épée fencers, he participated at four consecutive Olympic Games in 1964, 1968, 1972 and 1976, being a fencer in each in addition to a pentathlete in his first appearance. He is also partly remembered for an incident at the 1965 World Pentathlon Championships, where he allegedly drank 10 beers and a bottle of cognac before firing his pistol into the ground and passing out.

== Early life ==
Polzhuber was born in June 1938 in Wien, Nazi Germany (present-day Vienna, Austria). (Note: Sports-Reference and Olympedia give conflicting dates of 29 and 24 June, respectively.) He was a member of the athletic club Heeressportverein Wien (commonly shortened to HSV Wien), and was one of only four Olympians affiliated with them.

== Sports career ==
Polzhuber competed in several sports and was talented in both fencing, specializing in the épée event, and modern pentathlon, a contest featuring pistol shooting, épée fencing, freestyle swimming, cross country running and equestrian show jumping. During his athletic career, he had a height of 183 cm (6 ft 0 in) and a weight of 85 kg (187 lb).

Polzhuber began his international career at the 1961 World Military Championships in Breda, winning a gold medal in the épée fencing event. Two years later, he returned to the event as a member of Austria's épée team (along with Marcus Leyrer, Roland Losert, and Rudolf Trost), helping them place fifth. He was selected to represent his country at the Olympics in 1964 for the first time, to compete in the individual and team modern pentathlon events, as well as the team and individual épée events, although he later withdrew from the individual épée event. In the individual modern pentathlon event, he placed 33rd, while in the team event Austria placed 10th, and in the team fencing competitions they tied for ninth.

Polzhuber participated the following year at the World Pentathlon Championships. An incident involving him there changed how the laws relating to performance-enhancing substances were applied. According to reports from the Hungarian team there, Polzhuber posted good scores in the first two events, equestrian and fencing, and was set to participate in the shooting contest. Before the shooting event, he allegedly drank 10 glasses of beer and an entire bottle of cognac, after which he stepped onto the shooting platform, shot all his bullets directly into the ground and passed out. It is unclear the reason he consumed alcohol before the event, although Der Spiegel and the Hungarian publication Borsodihir both state that, at the time, athletes in shooting sports commonly drank prior to competition to "calm their nerves." Following this incident, several athletic organizations banned alcohol and performance-enhancing substance laws were enforced more strictly.

Two years later, Polzhuber competed at both the Military World Championships and the World Fencing Championships, winning the silver medal in the individual épée event at the former while helping the Austrian team place fifth in the latter. He was selected for his second Olympic appearance in 1968, competing at both the team and individual épée events. Austria placed ninth in the team event while Polzhuber had the best placement of his Olympic career in the individual event. He began by advancing from the first pool with a record of 4–1. He then went 3–2 in the second pool and advanced to the double elimination bracket, winning his first two matches before being sent to the losers bracket with a loss to Viktor Modzolevsky. Polzhuber rose through the losers bracket and defeated Henryk Nielaba to earn a spot in the finals. He won only one of five matches in the final round to finish at fifth place in the tournament, the best he would have in his eventually four Olympic appearances.

In 1970, Polzhuber competed at the Military World Championships in Rome and the World Fencing Championships. At the Military Championships, he won first place in the singles fencing event and also won gold in the team event. At the World Fencing Championships, he was a member of the team that finished fifth. By the end of the year, Polzhuber was ranked as the fourth-best fencer in the world. He returned to the World Fencing Championships in 1971 in the team event, helping them place 6th. Polzhuber was selected for his third Olympic appearance in 1972, competing in only the team event and helping them tie for ninth. He was selected to the Olympics for a final time in 1976, and competed for the Austrian team that placed 11th.

== Later life ==
After retiring, Polzhuber became a trainer for his former athletic club, Heeressportverein Wien. He also was a teacher at the Austrian military school HSNS, and held the rank of commander. He died on 24 June 2015 in Vienna, at the age of 77. His death notice in the European Fencing Confederation newsletter described him as "one of Austria's best former épée fencers."
