= Sweden at the 1964 Summer Olympics =

- IOC code: SWE
- NOC: Swedish Olympic Committee

in Tokyo
- Competitors: 94 (76 men and 18 women) in 13 sports
- Flag bearer: William Hamilton
- Medals Ranked 17th: Gold 2 Silver 2 Bronze 4 Total 8

Summer Olympics appearances (overview)
- 1896; 1900; 1904; 1908; 1912; 1920; 1924; 1928; 1932; 1936; 1948; 1952; 1956; 1960; 1964; 1968; 1972; 1976; 1980; 1984; 1988; 1992; 1996; 2000; 2004; 2008; 2012; 2016; 2020; 2024; 2028

Other related appearances
- 1906 Intercalated Games

Sweden competed at the 1964 Summer Olympics in Tokyo, Japan which ran from 11 October 1964 to 24 October 1964. 94 competitors, 76 men and 18 women, took part in 72 events in 13 sports.

== Medalists ==
| Medal | Name | Sport | Event |
|---|---|---|---|
| Gold | Rolf Peterson | Canoeing | Men's K1 1000 m |
| Gold | Sven-Olov Sjödelius; Gunnar Utterberg | Canoeing | Men's K2 1000 m |
| Silver | Per Svensson | Wrestling (Greco-Roman) | Men's Light Heavyweight |
| Silver | Arne Karlsson; Sture Stork; Lars Thörn | Sailing | Men's 5½ m Class |
| Bronze | Ingvar Pettersson | Athletics | Men's 50 km Walk |
| Bronze | Sven Hamrin; Erik Pettersson; Gösta Pettersson; Sture Pettersson | Cycling | Men's Team Road Race |
| Bronze | Bertil Nyström | Wrestling (Greco-Roman) | Men's Welterweight |
| Bronze | Pelle Pettersson; Holger Sundström | Sailing | Men's Star Class |

== Athletics ==
Men's Discus Throw

- Lars Haglund

- Qualification – no mark (→ did not advance, no ranking)

== Cycling ==
Four cyclists represented Sweden in 1964.

Individual road race

- Gösta Pettersson – 4:39:51.74 (→ 7th place)
- Erik Pettersson – 4:39:51.74 (→ 11th place)
- Sven Hamrin – 4:39:51.79 (→ 49th place)
- Sture Pettersson – 4:39:51.79 (→ 51st place)

Team time trial

- Sven Hamrin
- Erik Pettersson
- Gösta Pettersson
- Sture Pettersson

== Diving ==
Men

| Athlete | Event | Preliminary | | Final | | | |
| Athlete | Event | Points | Rank | Points | Rank | Total | Rank |
|---|---|---|---|---|---|---|---|
| Göran Lundqvist | 3 m springboard | 91.77 | 6 Q | 46.88 | 4 | 138.65 | 5 |

Women

| Athlete | Event | Preliminary | | Final | | | |
| Athlete | Event | Points | Rank | Points | Rank | Total | Rank |
|---|---|---|---|---|---|---|---|
| Kerstin Rybrant | 3 m springboard | 61.74 | 21 | Did not advance | | | |

== Fencing ==
Seven fencers, five men and two women, represented Sweden in 1964.

Men's épée

- Orvar Lindwall
- Hans Lagerwall
- Göran Abrahamsson

Men's team épée

- Ivar Genesjö, Orvar Lindwall, Hans Lagerwall, Göran Abrahamsson, Carl-Wilhelm Engdahl

Women's foil

- Kerstin Palm
- Christina Wahlberg

== Modern pentathlon ==
Three male pentathlete represented Sweden in 1964.

Individual

- Bo Jansson
- Rolf Junefelt
- Hans-Gunnar Liljenwall

Team

- Bo Jansson
- Rolf Junefelt
- Hans-Gunnar Liljenwall

== Shooting ==
Six shooters represented Sweden in 1964.

25 m pistol

- Stig Berntsson

50 m pistol

- Leif Larsson

300 m rifle, three positions

- John Sundberg
- Jan Poignant

50 m rifle, three positions

- Jan Poignant
- John Sundberg

50 m rifle, prone

- Jan Poignant
- John Sundberg

Trap

- Lennart Ahlin
- Rune Flodman

== Swimming ==
Men

| Athlete | Event | Heat | | Semifinal | | Final | |
| Athlete | Event | Time | Rank | Time | Rank | Time | Rank |
|---|---|---|---|---|---|---|---|
| Lester Eriksson | 100 m freestyle | 56.2 | =28 | Did not advance | | | |
| Per-Ola Lindberg | 100 m freestyle | 55.1 | =5 Q | 55.1 | 10 | Did not advance | |
| Bengt Nordwall | 100 m freestyle | 55.6 | =14 Q | 56.4 | =21 | Did not advance | |
| Hans Rosendahl | 400 m freestyle | 4:23.5 | 10 | —N/a | | Did not advance | |
| Mats Svensson | 400 m freestyle | 4:24.6 | 12 | —N/a | | Did not advance | |
| Olle Ferm | 400 m individual medley | 5:10.5 | 16 | —N/a | | Did not advance | |
| Bengt Nordwall; Ingvar Eriksson; Jan Lundin; Per-Ola Lindberg | 4 × 100 m freestyle relay | 3:41.3 | 4 Q | —N/a | | 3:40.7 | 5 |
| Mats Svensson; Lester Eriksson; Hans Rosendahl; Jan Lundin | 4 × 200 m freestyle relay | 8:10.3 | 3 Q | —N/a | | 8:08.0 | 5 |

Women

| Athlete | Event | Heat | | Semifinal | | Final | |
| Athlete | Event | Time | Rank | Time | Rank | Time | Rank |
|---|---|---|---|---|---|---|---|
| Ann-Christine Hagberg | 100 m freestyle | 1:02.5 | =6 Q | 1:02.8 | 8 Q | 1:02.5 | 7 |
| Ulla Jäfvert | 100 m freestyle | 1:03.8 | =17 Q | 1:04.6 | 16 | Did not advance | |
| Ann-Charlotte Lilja | 100 m freestyle | 1:03.7 | =15 Q | 1:03.9 | =14 | Did not advance | |
| Ann-Charlotte Lilja | 400 m freestyle | 4:52.3 | 6 Q | —N/a | | 4:53.0 | 8 |
| Elisabeth Ljunggren | 400 m freestyle | 4:57.0 | 12 | —N/a | | Did not advance | |
| Majvor Welander | 400 m freestyle | 5:07.7 | 24 | —N/a | | Did not advance | |
| Ann-Charlotte Lilja; Lotten Andersson; Ulla Jäfvert; Ann-Christine Hagberg | 4 × 100 m freestyle relay | 4:13.5 | 4 Q | —N/a | | 4:14.0 | 5 |
