= 1966 World Modern Pentathlon Championships =

The 1966 World Modern Pentathlon Championships were held in Melbourne, Victoria, Australia from 6 – 10 November 1966.

== Medal summary ==
=== Men's events ===
Event	(gold) Gold	(silver) Silver	(bronze) Bronze
Individual	András Balczó (HUN)	Viktor Mineyev (URS)	Ferenc Török (HUN)
Team	Hungary; Ferenc Török; István Mona; András Balczó	Soviet Union; Stasys Šaparnis; Pavel Lednev; Viktor Mineyev	East Germany; Uwe Adler; Manfred Grosse; Wolfgang Lüderitz

== Medal table ==
Rank	Nation	Gold	Silver	Bronze	Total
1	Hungary (HUN)	2	0	1	3
2	Soviet Union (URS)	0	2	0	2
3	East Germany (GDR)	0	0	1	1
Totals (3 entries)		2	2	2	6

== See also ==
- World Modern Pentathlon Championship
