= Maaten =

Maaten is a Dutch surname. Notable people with the surname include:

- Jules Maaten (born 1961), Dutch politician
- Kenneth Maaten (born 1953), Canadian modern pentathlete

== See also ==
- Jacob Jan van der Maaten (1820–1879), Dutch painter and etcher
