= Enrique Padilla =

Enrique Padilla may refer to:

- Enrique Padilla (polo) (1890–?), Argentine polo player
- Enrique Padilla (pentathlete) (born 1934), Mexican modern pentathlete
