= Fukudome =

Fukudome (written: 福留), also transliterated as Fukutome, is a Japanese surname. Notable people with the surname include:

- Kosuke Fukudome (福留 孝介, born 1977), Japanese baseball player
- Ryo Fukudome (福留 亮, born 1978), Japanese footballer
- Shigeru Fukudome (福留 繁, 1891–1971), Japanese admiral
- Yoshihide Fukutome (福留 義秀, born 1933), Japanese modern pentathlete
