= 1962 World Modern Pentathlon Championships =

The 1962 World Modern Pentathlon Championships were held in Mexico City, Mexico from 21 – 25 October 1962.

== Medal summary ==
=== Men's events ===
Event	(gold) Gold	(silver) Silver	(bronze) Bronze
Individual	Edvard Sdobnikov (URS)	Igor Novikov (URS)	Ferenc Török (HUN)
Team	Soviet Union; Edvard Sdobnikov; Valeriy Pizhuchkin; Igor Novikov	Hungary; Ferenc Török; Imre Nagy; András Balczó	United States; John Daniels; Allan Jackson; Paul Pesthy

== Medal table ==
Rank	Nation	Gold	Silver	Bronze	Total
1	Soviet Union (URS)	2	1	0	3
2	Hungary (HUN)	0	1	1	2
3	United States (USA)	0	0	1	1
Totals (3 entries)		2	2	2	6

== See also ==
- World Modern Pentathlon Championships
