= Vanhala =

Vanhala is a Finnish surname.

== Geographical distribution ==
As of 2014, 85.8% of all known bearers of the surname Vanhala were residents of Finland.

In Finland, the frequency of the surname was higher than national average in the following regions:

1. Kymenlaakso (1:395)
2. Päijänne Tavastia (1:1,893)
3. North Ostrobothnia (1:1,898)
4. Central Ostrobothnia (1:2,090)
5. Lapland (1:2,374)
6. Central Finland (1:3,009)
7. Tavastia Proper (1:3,095)

== People ==
- Jari Vanhala (born 1965), Finnish footballer
- Keijo Vanhala (1940–2003), Finnish modern pentathlete
