= 1964 Summer Olympics Parade of Nations =

During the Parade of Nations portion of the 1964 Summer Olympics opening ceremony, athletes from each country participating in the Olympics paraded in the arena, preceded by their flag. The flag was borne by a sportsperson from that country chosen either by the National Olympic Committee or by the athletes themselves to represent their country. Although the Games were held in Japan, English was used to organize the Parade of Nations instead of Japanese. Had the parade followed the Japanese characters, Greece would have been followed by Iceland, and Rhodesia would have been the penultimate country before Japan. The Japanese language order would not be introduced until 2020 when the country hosted the games for the fourth time.

== List ==
Order	Nation	Japanese name	Roman transliteration	Flag bearer	Sport
1	Greece	ギリシャ	Girisha	Georgios Marsellos	Athletics
2	Afghanistan	アフガニスタン	Afuganisutan	Mohammad Ebrahim Khedri	Wrestling
3	Algeria	アルジェリア	Arujeria	Mohamed Lazhari	Gymnastics
4	Argentina	アルゼンチン	Aruzenchin	Jeannette Campbell	Swimming
5	Australia	オーストラリア	Ōsutoraria	Ivan Lund	Fencing
6	Austria	オーストリア	Ōsutoria	Hubert Hammerer	Shooting
7	Bahamas	バハマ	Bahama	TBC	TBC
8	Belgium	ベルギー	Berugī	Gaston Roelants	Athletics
9	Bermuda	バミューダ	Bamyūda	Whitfield Hayward	President of the Bermuda Olympic Association
10	Bolivia	ボリビア	Boribia	Fernando Inchauste	Canoeing
11	Brazil	ブラジル	Burajiru	Wlamir Marques	Basketball
12	Guyana	イギリス領ギアナ	Igirisu-ryō Giana	Dr. Joe Allí-Shaw	Guyana Olympic Association Official
13	Bulgaria	ブルガリア	Burugaria	Enyu Valchev	Wrestling
14	Burma	ビルマ	Biruma	TBC	TBC
15	Cambodia	カンボジア	Kambojia	TBC	TBC
16	Cameroon	カメルーン	Kamerūn	David Njitock	Men's 100 metres
17	Canada	カナダ	Kanada	Gil Boa	Shooting
18	Ceylon	セイロン	Seiron	Ravi Jayewardene	Shooting
19	Chad	チャド	Chado	TBC	TBC
20	Chile	チリ	Chiri	Aquiles Gloffka	Fencing
21	Colombia	コロンビア	Koronbia	Emilio Echeverry	Fencing
22	Republic of the Congo	コンゴ	Kongo	TBC	TBC
23	Costa Rica	コスタリカ	Kosutarika	TBC	TBC
24	Cuba	キューバ	Kyūba	Ernesto Varona	Weightlifting
25	Czechoslovakia	チェコスロバキア	Chekosurobakia	Karel Klečka	Gymnastics
26	Denmark	デンマーク	Denmāku	Henning Wind	Sailing
27	Dominican Republic	ドミニカ共和国	Dominika Kyōwakoku	Alberto Torres	Athletics
28	Ethiopia	エチオピア	Echiopiya	Abebe Bikila	Athletics
29	Finland	フィンランド	Finrando	Eugen Ekman	Gymnastics
30	France	フランス	Furansu	Michel Macquet	Athletics
31	United Team of Germany	ドイツ	Doitsu	Ingrid Engel-Krämer	Diving
32	Ghana	ガーナ	Gāna	TBC	TBC
33	Great Britain	イギリス	Igirisu	Anita Lonsbrough	Swimming
34	Hong Kong	香港	Honkon	TBC	TBC
35	Hungary	ハンガリー	Hangarī	Gergely Kulcsár	Athletics
36	Iceland	アイスランド	Aisurando	Valbjörn Þorláksson	Athletics
37	India	インド	Indo	Gurbachan Singh Randhawa	Athletics
38	Iran	イラン	Iran	Nosratollah Shahmir	Olympic Committee Official
39	Iraq	イラク	Iraku	TBC	TBC
40	Ireland	アイルランド	Airurando	John Lawlor	Athletics
41	Israel	イスラエル	Isuraeru	Gideon Ariel	Athletics
42	Italy	イタリア	Itaria	Giuseppe Delfino	Fencing
43	Ivory Coast	コートジボワール	Kōto Jibowāru	TBC	TBC
44	Jamaica	ジャマイカ	Jamaika	TBC	TBC
45	Kenya	ケニア	Kenia	Kip Keino	Athletics
46	South Korea	韓国	Kankoku	TBC	TBC
47	Lebanon	レバノン	Rebanon	TBC	TBC
48	Liberia	リベリア	Riberia	Wesley Momo Johnson	Athletics
49	Libya	リビア	Ribia	—N/a	—N/a
50	Liechtenstein	リヒテンシュタイン	Rihitenshutain	Alois Büchel	Athletics
51	Luxembourg	ルクセンブルク	Rukusenburugu	Josy Stoffel	Gymnastics
52	Madagascar	マダガスカル	Madagasukaru	TBC	TBC
53	Malaysia	マレーシア	Marēshia	Kuda Ditta	Athletics
54	Mali	マリ	Mari	TBC	TBC
55	Mexico	メキシコ	Mekishiko	Fidel Negrete	Athletics
56	Monaco	モナコ	Monako	Joseph Asso	Official
57	Mongolia	モンゴル	Mongoru	Ch. Naydan	Official
58	Morocco	モロッコ	Morokko	TBC	TBC
59	Nepal	ネパール	Nepāru	Ram Prasad Gurung	Boxing
60	Netherlands	オランダ	Oranda	Anton Geesink	Judo
61	Netherlands Antilles	オランダ領アンティル	Oranda-ryō Antiru	TBC	TBC
62	New Zealand	ニュージーランド	Nyūjīrando	Peter Snell	Athletics
63	Niger	ニジェール	Nijēru	Issake Dabore	Boxing
64	Nigeria	ナイジェリア	Naijeria	TBC	TBC
65	Northern Rhodesia	北ローデシア	Kita-Rōdeshia	Trevor Haynes	Athletics
66	Norway	ノルウェー	Noruwē	Crown Prince Harald	Sailing
67	Pakistan	パキスタン	Pakisutan	Manzoor Hussain Atif	Field hockey
68	Panama	パナマ	Panama	Lorraine Dunn	Athletics
69	Peru	ペルー	Perū	TBC	TBC
70	Philippines	フィリピン	Firipin	Manfredo Alipala	Boxing
71	Poland	ポーランド	Pōrando	Waldemar Baszanowski	Weightlifting
72	Portugal	ポルトガル	Porutogaru	Fernando Matos	Judo
73	Puerto Rico	プエルトリコ	Puertoriko	Rolando Cruz	Athletics
74	Rhodesia	ローデシア	Rōdeshia	Lloyd Koch	Field hockey
75	Romania	ルーマニア	Rūmania	Aurel Vernescu	Canoeing
76	Senegal	セネガル	Senegaru	TBC	TBC
77	Spain	スペイン	Supein	Eduardo Dualde	Field hockey
78	Sweden	スウェーデン	Suwēden	William Hamilton	Equestrian
79	Switzerland	スイス	Suisu	Peter Laeng	
80	Taiwan (TWN)	中華民国	Chūka Minkoku	Yang Chuan-kwang	Athletics
81	Tanganyika	タンガニーカ	Tanganīka	TBC	TBC
82	Thailand	タイ	Tai	Katesepsawasdi Bhakdikul	Athletics
83	Trinidad and Tobago	トリニダード・トバゴ	Torinidādo Tobago	Wendell Mottley	Athletics
84	Tunisia	チュニジア	Chunijia	Slaheddine Baly	Official
85	Turkey	トルコ	Toruko	Çetin Şahiner	Athletics
86	Uganda	ウガンダ	Uganda	TBC	TBC
87	United Arab Republic	アラブ連合共和国	Arabu Rengō Kyōwakoku	TBC	TBC
88	Uruguay	ウルグアイ	Uruguai		
89	United States	アメリカ	Amerika	Parry O’Brien	Athletics
90	Soviet Union	ソビエト	Sobieto	Yury Vlasov	Weightlifting
91	Venezuela	ベネズエラ	Benezuera	Téodoro Capriles	Swimming
92	Vietnam	ベトナム	Betonamu	TBC	TBC
93	Yugoslavia	ユーゴスラビア	Yūgosurabia	Miroslav Cerar	Gymnastics
94	Japan	日本	Nihon	Makoto Fukui	Swimming

== See also ==
- 2020 Summer Olympics Parade of Nations, also in Tokyo, Japan.
- 1972 Winter Olympics Parade of Nations
- 1998 Winter Olympics Parade of Nations
