= David Kirkwood (disambiguation) =

David Kirkwood was a Scottish socialist politician

David Kirkood can also refer to:

- David Kirkwood (Reform politician), a Scottish Reform UK politician
- David Kirkwood (pentathlete), an American modern pentathlete
