= Spîrlea =

Spîrlea is a Romanian surname. Notable people with the surname include:

- Dumitru Spîrlea (born 1950), Romanian modern pentathlete
- Irina Spîrlea (born 1974), Romanian tennis player, daughter of Dumitru
