= 1963 World Modern Pentathlon Championships =

The 1963 World Modern Pentathlon Championships were held in Magglingen, Switzerland from 22 – 26 September 1963.

== Medal summary ==
=== Men's events ===
Event	(gold) Gold	(silver) Silver	(bronze) Bronze
Individual	András Balczó (HUN)	Ferenc Török (HUN)	Igor Novikov (URS)
Team	Hungary; Ferenc Török; István Mona; András Balczó	Soviet Union; Albert Mokeyev; Pavel Lednyov; Igor Novikov	United States; Robert Miller; James Moore; Paul Pesthy

== Medal table ==
Rank	Nation	Gold	Silver	Bronze	Total
1	Hungary (HUN)	2	1	0	3
2	Soviet Union (URS)	0	1	1	2
3	United States (USA)	0	0	1	1
Totals (3 entries)		2	2	2	6

== See also ==
- World Modern Pentathlon Championships
