= 1967 World Modern Pentathlon Championships =

The 1967 World Modern Pentathlon Championships were held in Jönköping, Sweden from 8 – 12 September 1967.

== Medal summary ==
=== Men's events ===
Event	(gold) Gold	(silver) Silver	(bronze) Bronze
Individual	András Balczó (HUN)	Stasys Šaparnis (URS)	Björn Ferm (SWE)
Team	Hungary; Ferenc Török; István Mona; András Balczó	Sweden; Björn Ferm; Hans Jacobsson; Hans-Gunnar Liljenwall	Soviet Union; Stasys Šaparnis; Edvard Sdobnikov; Boris Onishchenko

== Medal table ==
Rank	Nation	Gold	Silver	Bronze	Total
1	Hungary (HUN)	2	0	0	2
2	Soviet Union (URS)	0	1	1	2
2	Sweden (SWE)	0	1	1	2
Totals (3 entries)		2	2	2	6

== See also ==
- World Modern Pentathlon Championship
