= Viktor Mineyev =

Soviet modern pentathlete

Personal information
- Born: 19 June 1937
- Died: 22 July 2002 (aged 65) Moscow

Sport
- Sport: Modern pentathlon
Medal record
Men's modern pentathlon
Representing Soviet Union
Olympic Games
Gold medal – first place	1964 Tokyo	Team
World Championships
Silver medal – second place	1963 Macolin	Team
Silver medal – second place	1966 Melbourne	Individual
Silver medal – second place	1966 Melbourne	Team

Viktor Mineyev (19 June 1937 – 22 July 2002) is a former Soviet modern pentathlete and Olympic Champion. He competed at the 1964 Summer Olympics in Tokyo, where he won a gold medal in the team competition (together with Igor Novikov and Albert Mokeyev), and placed fifth in the individual competition. He was the first athlete from Azerbaijan to win a gold Olympic medal (1964 Olympic Games of Tokyo).
