= Chile at the 1964 Summer Olympics =

- IOC code: CHI
- NOC: Chilean Olympic Committee

in Tokyo
- Competitors: 14 (all men) in 6 sports
- Flag bearer: Aquilles Gloffka
- Medals: Gold 0 Silver 0 Bronze 0 Total 0

Summer Olympics appearances (overview)
- 1896; 1900–1908; 1912; 1920; 1924; 1928; 1932; 1936; 1948; 1952; 1956; 1960; 1964; 1968; 1972; 1976; 1980; 1984; 1988; 1992; 1996; 2000; 2004; 2008; 2012; 2016; 2020; 2024

Chile at the 1964 Summer Olympics in Tokyo, Japan] was the nation's twelfth appearance out of fifteen editions of the Summer Olympic Games. The nation was represented by an all-male team of 14 athletes that competed in 13 events in 6 sports.

== Athletics ==
Key

- Note–Ranks given for track events are within the athlete's heat only
- Q = Qualified for the next round

Men
Track & road events

Athlete	Event	Heat		Quarterfinal		Semifinal		Final	
Athlete	Event	Result	Rank	Result	Rank	Result	Rank	Result	Rank
Iván Moreno	100 m	10.5	2 Q	10.6	6	Did not advance			
Iván Moreno	200 m	21.5	4 Q	21.7	7	Did not advance			
Ricardo Vidal	Marathon	—N/a						2:28:01.6	30

Field events

Athlete	Event	Qualification		Final	
Athlete	Event	Result	Rank	Result	Rank
Patricio Etcheverry	Javelin throw	60.77	24	Did not advance	

== Fencing ==
Three fencers, all men, represented Chile in 1964.

Men's épée

- Sergio Vergara
- Sergio Jimenez
- Aquilles Gloffka

== Modern pentathlon ==
One male pentathlete represented Chile in 1964.

Individual

- Aquilles Gloffka

== Shooting ==
Three shooters represented Chile in 1964.

50 m rifle, prone

- Roberto Huber

Trap

- Juan Enrique Lira
- Gilberto Navarro
