= Modern pentathlon at the 1963 Pan American Games =

== Medal summary ==
=== Medal table ===
Rank	Nation	Gold	Silver	Bronze	Total
1	United States	2	1	1	4
2	Brazil	0	1	0	1
3	Mexico	0	0	1	1
Totals (3 entries)		2	2	2	6

=== Events ===
Event	Gold	Silver	Bronze
Men's individual	Robert Beck; United States	Richard Stoll; United States	James Moore; United States
Men's team	United States of America; United States	Brazil; Brazil	Mexico; Mexico
