= Sergio Vergara (fencer) =

Chilean fencer

Personal information
- Born: 29 November 1927
- Died: 15 December 2003 (aged 76)

Sport
- Sport: Fencing

Sergio Vergara (29 November 1927 – 15 December 2003) was a Chilean fencer. He competed in the individual épée event at the 1964 Summer Olympics.
