= Ottó Török =

Hungarian modern pentathlete

Personal information
- Born: 1 November 1937 (age 88) Csillaghegy, Hungary

Sport
- Sport: Modern pentathlon
Medal record
Men's modern pentathlon
Representing Hungary
Olympic Games
| Bronze medal – third place | 1964 Tokyo | Team |

Ottó Török (born 1 November 1937) is a Hungarian former modern pentathlete. He competed at the 1964 Summer Olympics winning a bronze medal in the team event.
