= Jan Poignant =

Swedish sports shooter

Personal information
- Born: 2 November 1941 Stockholm, Sweden
- Died: 13 February 2024 (aged 82)

Sport
- Sport: Sports shooting

Jan Poignant (2 November 1941 – 13 February 2024) was a Swedish sports shooter. He competed in three events at the 1964 Summer Olympics.
