= José Pereira (pentathlete) =

Portuguese modern pentathlete

Personal information
- Full name: José Serra Pereira
- Born: 21 June 1918

Sport
- Sport: Modern pentathlon

José Pereira (born 21 June 1918, date of death unknown) was a Portuguese modern pentathlete. He competed at the 1952 Summer Olympics.
