= Duncan Page =

Australian fencer

Personal information
- Born: 29 October 1934 (age 91) Australia

Sport
- Sport: Modern pentathlon, fencing

Duncan Page (born 29 October 1934) is an Australian modern pentathlete and fencer who competed at the 1964 and 1968 Summer Olympics.

== Competitive highlights ==
- 1964 Summer Olympics — Modern Pentathalon: Men's Individual (27th) (4286)
- 1968 Summer Olympics — Modern Pentathalon: Men's Individual (39th) (3904)
