= István Móna =

Hungarian modern pentathlete

Personal information
- Born: 17 September 1940 Nyíregyháza, Hungary
- Died: 28 July 2010 (aged 69)

Sport
- Sport: Modern pentathlon
Medal record
Men's modern pentathlon
Representing Hungary
Olympic Games
Men's Olympic Games
Gold medal – first place	1968 Mexico City	Team
World Championships
Gold medal – first place	1963 Magglingen	Team
Gold medal – first place	1965 Leipzig	Team
Gold medal – first place	1966 Melbourne	Team
Gold medal – first place	1967 Jönköping	Team

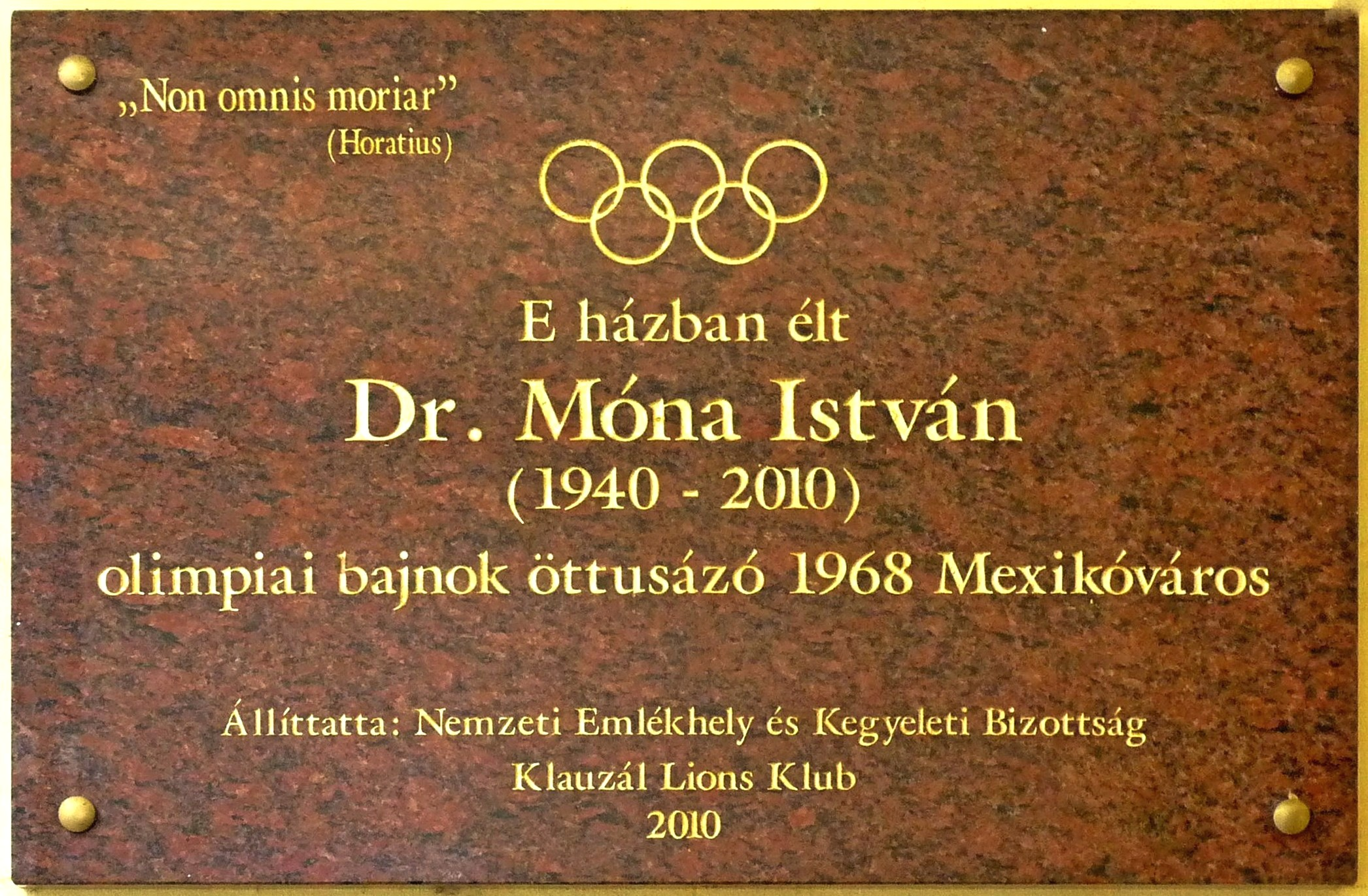
Commemorative plaque on his former home (Budapest, District XIII, Pannónia Street Nr 13).

István Móna (17 September 1940 – 28 July 2010) was a Hungarian modern pentathlete and Olympic champion. He was born in Nyíregyháza.

== Olympics ==
Móna won a gold medal at the 1968 Summer Olympics in Mexico City with the Hungarian team.
