= Hannu Vaahtoranta =

Finnish swimmer (1943–2023)

Personal information
- Born: 20 May 1943 Helsinki, Finland
- Died: 15 December 2023 (aged 80) Helsinki, Finland

Sport
- Sport: Swimming

Hannu Vaahtoranta (20 May 1943 – 15 December 2023) was a Finnish swimmer. He competed in three events at the 1964 Summer Olympics.
