= Tuomo Hämäläinen =

Finnish swimmer

Personal information
- Born: 3 April 1945 (age 81) Kotka, Finland

Sport
- Sport: Swimming

Tuomo Hämäläinen (born 3 April 1945) is a Finnish former freestyle swimmer. He competed in three events at the 1964 Summer Olympics.
