= Sven Hamrin =

Swedish cyclist

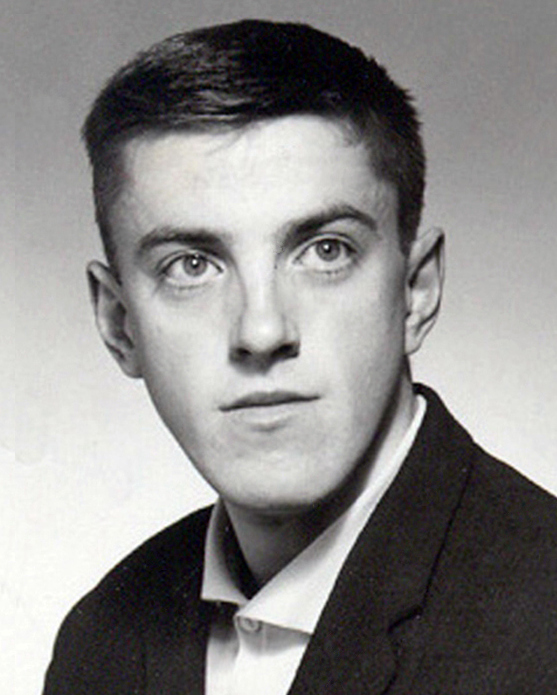

Personal information
- Full name: Sven Helge Hamrin
- Born: 30 March 1941 Härnösand, Sweden
- Died: 25 January 2018 (aged 76)
- Height: 176 cm (5 ft 9 in)
- Weight: 72 kg (159 lb)

Cycling career
- Sport: Cycling

Amateur team
- Härnösands CK
Medal record
Men's cycling
Representing Sweden
Olympic Games
Bronze medal – third place	1964 Tokyo	Team time trial

Sven Helge Hamrin (30 March 1941 – 25 January 2018) was a Swedish cyclist who competed in the 1964 Olympics. He finished 50th in the individual road race and won a bronze medal in the team time trial, riding with the Fåglum brothers. The same year, he won the road race at the national championships.

In 1970, he was involved in an auto accident in Norway, as a result of which he remained in a coma for 40 days. Eventually, he recovered and resumed cycling, even though one of his legs was seven centimeters shorter as a result of multiple surgeries.
