= James Moore (pentathlete) =

American modern pentathlete (born 1935)

Personal information
- Full name: James Warren Moore
- Born: February 20, 1935 (age 91) Erie, Pennsylvania, U.S.
- Height: 5 ft 9 in (175 cm)
- Weight: 148 lb (67 kg)
Medal record
Men's modern pentathlon
Representing the United States
Olympic Games
Silver medal – second place	1964 Tokyo	Team
Pan American Games
Gold medal – first place	1963 São Paulo	Team
Bronze medal – third place	1963 São Paulo	Individual
World Championships
Bronze medal – third place	1963 Magglingen	Team

James Warren Moore (born February 20, 1935) is an American former modern pentathlete who competed in the 1964 Summer Olympics and in the 1968 Summer Olympics.
