= Matti Kasvio =

Finnish swimmer

Personal information
- Born: 20 February 1944 Helsinki, Finland
- Died: 21 August 2013 (aged 69) Espoo, Finland

Sport
- Sport: Swimming

Matti Kasvio (20 February 1944 – 21 August 2013) was a Finnish freestyle swimmer. He competed in two events at the 1964 Summer Olympics.
