= Akira Kubo (pentathlete) =

Japanese modern pentathlete

Personal information
- Born: 12 January 1943 (age 83)

Sport
- Sport: Modern pentathlon

Akira Kubo (久保 晃, Kubo Akira; born 12 January 1943) is a Nipponese modern pentathlete. He competed at the 1972 and 1976 Summer Olympics.
