= Stanisław Skwira =

Polish modern pentathlete

Personal information
- Born: 16 August 1951 (age 74) Ciepielów, Poland

Sport
- Sport: Modern pentathlon

Stanisław Skwira (born 16 August 1951) is a Polish modern pentathlete. He competed at the 1972 Summer Olympics.
