= Georgi Stoyanov =

Bulgarian modern pentathlete

Personal information
- Born: 20 September 1947 (age 78) Sofia, Bulgaria

Sport
- Sport: Modern pentathlon

Georgi Stoyanov (Bulgarian: Георги Стоянов, born 20 September 1947) is a Bulgarian modern pentathlete. He competed at the 1972 Summer Olympics.
