= Hole Rößler =

German modern pentathlete

Personal information
- Born: 17 April 1949 (age 77) Schleswig, Germany

Sport
- Sport: Modern pentathlon

Hole Rößler (born 17 April 1949) is a German modern pentathlete. He competed for West Germany at the 1972 Summer Olympics.
