= Scott Scheuermann =

Canadian modern pentathlete (born 1954)

Personal information
- Born: 23 April 1954 (age 72) Morristown, New Jersey, United States

Sport
- Sport: Modern pentathlon

Scott Scheuermann (born 23 April 1954) is a Canadian modern pentathlete. He competed at the 1972 Summer Olympics.
