= Charles Richards (pentathlete) =

American modern pentathlete (born 1945)

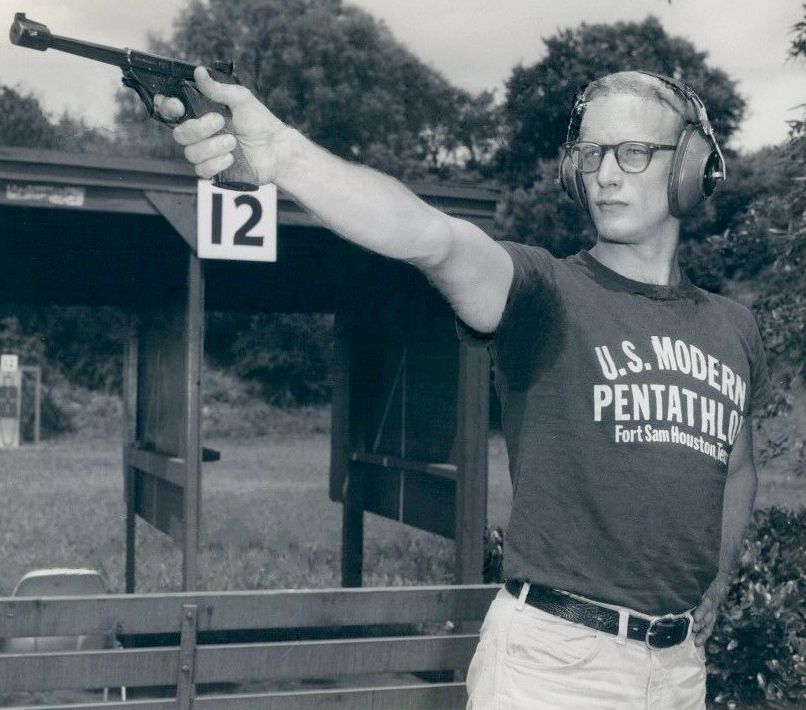
- Richards in 1970

Personal information
- Born: March 19, 1945 (age 81) Tacoma, Washington, U.S.
- Height: 180 cm (5 ft 11 in)
- Weight: 77 kg (170 lb)

Sport
- Sport: Modern pentathlon
- College team: University of Indiana; Swim team
- Club: U.S. Army

Charles Leonard Richards (born March 19, 1945) is a retired American modern pentathlete. He competed at the 1972 Summer Olympics in Munich, where the U.S. team placed fourth and he placed ninth individually.

While a youth in Tacoma, he swam for Dick Hannula's Tacoma Swim Club.

A graduate of Indiana University in 1967, he was a two-time All-American in Swimming under Hall of Fame Coach Doc Counsilman, but was soon training in modern pentathlon. After College, he joined the US Army and competed at the 1972 Olympics while at Texas's Fort Sam Houston. Richards won the 1967 US Junior pentathlete title, and was US Champion in the modern pentathlon in 1970-72. Dominating in the sport, he won the International Military Sports Council (CISM) title in 1969, 1971, and 1972.

Richards later moved to Portland, Oregon where he opened a health club, the Cornell Court Club (later renamed the Sunset Athletic Club) in 1977. In 2009, Richards was inducted into the Oregon Sports Hall of Fame for his advocacy of sports, fitness, and the Hall of Fame itself.
