= Walter Esser =

German modern pentathlete

Personal information
- Born: 21 February 1945 (age 81) Thale, Germany

Sport
- Sport: Modern pentathlon

Walter Esser (born 21 February 1945) is a German modern pentathlete. He competed for West Germany at the 1972 and 1976 Summer Olympics.
