= David Kirkwood (pentathlete) =

American modern pentathlete

Personal information
- Nickname: Dave
- Born: September 20, 1935 Jackson, Mississippi, United States
- Died: January 8, 2012 (aged 76) Albuquerque, New Mexico, United States
- Height: 6 ft 0 in (183 cm)
- Weight: 181 lb (82 kg)

Sport
- Country: USA
- Sport: Modern pentathlon

Achievements and titles
- Olympic finals: 1964 Summer Olympics: Men's Modern Pentathlon (team); Silver
Medal record
Men's modern pentathlon
Representing United States
Olympic Games
Silver medal – second place	1964 Tokyo	Team

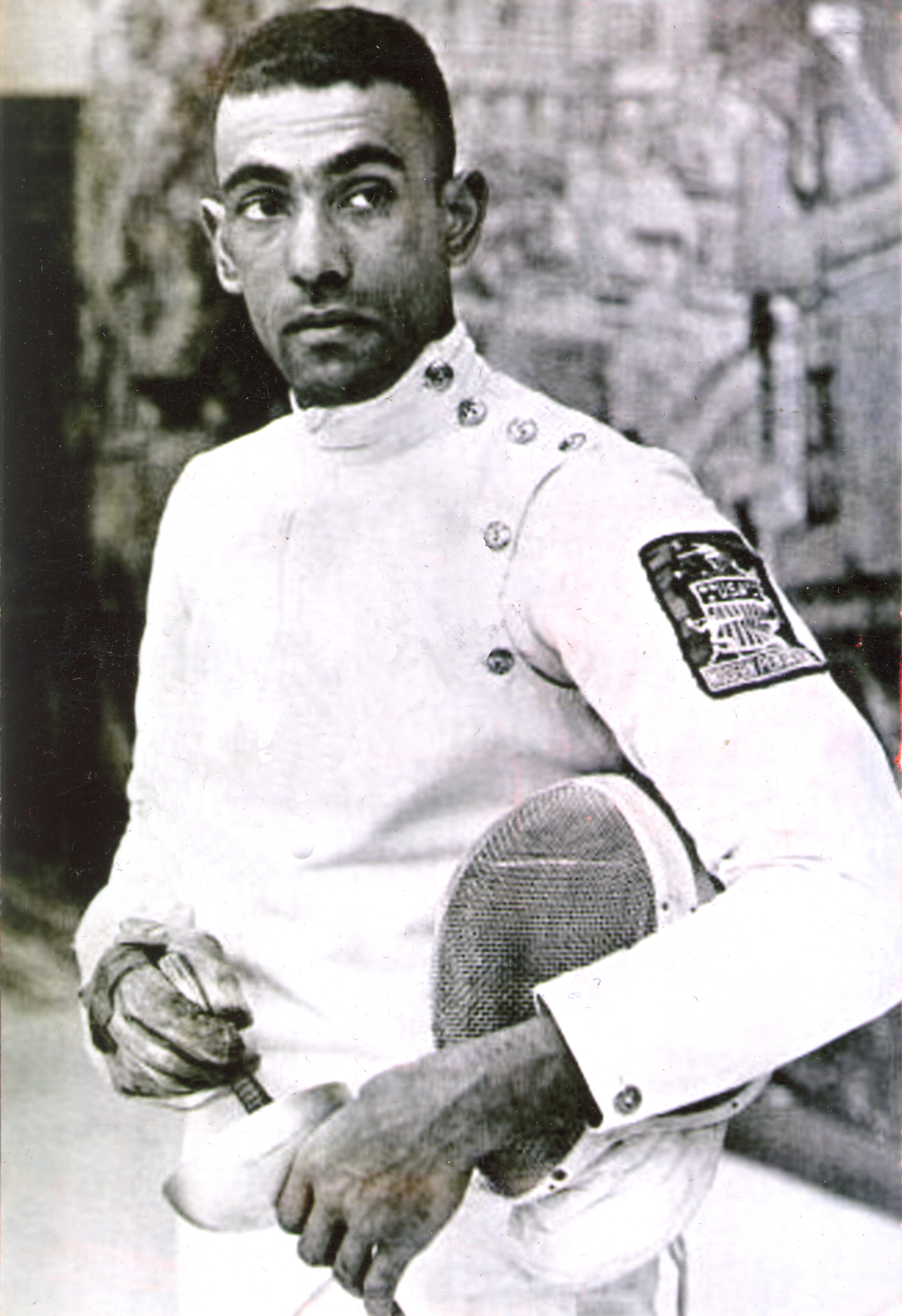

David Arthur Kirkwood (September 20, 1935 – January 8, 2012) was an African American pentathlete and actor. He competed at the 1964 Summer Olympics winning a silver medal in the team event.

Kirkwood was born in Jackson, Mississippi but moved with his family to Los Angeles, California as a child. He attended Susan Miller Dorsey High School. After graduating from Dorsey in 1952, Kirkwood attended George Pepperdine College where he studied teaching and graduated in 1956.

== Olympic experience ==
Kirkwood enlisted in the Air Force in 1958. The following year, Kirkwood learned of the modern pentathlon and determined to give it a try. He expressed an interest with the Army and was given a tryout at the U.S. Modern Pentathlon Training Center at Fort Sam Houston in San Antonio, Texas where the bulk of the U.S. pentathletes were training for the 1960 Summer Olympics. While he wasn't able to make that 1960 team he did attend the games in Rome as a spectator. Kirkwood showed enough promise that the Army allowed him to be permanently assigned to Fort Sam Houston to train for the next Olympics.

Over the next four years, Kirkwood devoted himself to a daily training regimen alongside the other pentathlon hopefuls. He made the three man U.S. team for the 1964 Games, which won a silver medal in the team competition. Kirkwood placed ninth among the individual competitors.

== Later life ==
After the Olympics Kirkwood continued his military career which lasted 20 years and included a tour of duty in Vietnam and stops at various bases in Europe. He married and he and his wife, Sylvia Rae Kirkwood raised four children: Robyn Katherine Kirkwood-Rhoades, Kerith E. Kirkwood, David A. Kirkwood and Adam R. Kirkwood. He ended his military career stationed at Malmstrom Air Force Base in Great Falls, Montana and he remained there after his Air Force retirement in 1978 with the rank of Major. After his Air Force retirement, he worked as a substitute teacher and began participating in community theater.

After a divorce in 1996, Kirkwood returned to Los Angeles to pursue a career in acting. He won roles in numerous television movies and series, including Don King Story, The Pretender, Tracy Ullman Takes On, ER, 3rd Rock from the Sun and Walker, Texas Ranger among others.

Kirkwood left California for Santa Fe, New Mexico in the early 2000s. He remarried Eliza M. Schmid and worked as an artist's model. He also spent time writing a history of the modern pentathlon, Pentathlon: Ancient, Modern, Contemporary. He died in Albuquerque, New Mexico in January 2012. His book was published posthumously in March 2012.
