= Ferenc Török =

Hungarian modern pentathlete

Personal information
- Born: 3 August 1935 (age 90) Csillaghegy, Hungary

Sport
- Sport: Modern pentathlon
Medal record
Men's modern pentathlon
Representing Hungary
Olympic Games
Gold medal – first place	1964 Tokyo	Individual
Gold medal – first place	1968 Mexico City	Team
Bronze medal – third place	1964 Tokyo	Team
World Championships
Gold medal – first place	1963 Magglingen	Team
Gold medal – first place	1965 Leipzig	Team
Gold medal – first place	1966 Melbourne	Team
Gold medal – first place	1967 Jönköping	Team
Silver medal – second place	1961 Moscow	Team
Silver medal – second place	1962 Mexico City	Team
Silver medal – second place	1963 Magglingen	Individual
Bronze medal – third place	1962 Mexico City	Individual
Bronze medal – third place	1965 Leipzig	Individual
Bronze medal – third place	1966 Melbourne	Individual

Ferenc Török (born 3 August 1935) is a Hungarian modern pentathlete and Olympic champion.

== Olympics ==
Ferenc Török received an individual gold medal at the 1964 Summer Olympics in Tokyo, and a bronze medal with the Hungarian team. He received a gold medal at the 1968 Summer Olympics in Mexico City with the Hungarian team.

== Awards ==
Török was elected Hungarian Sportsman of the Year in 1964, and Hungarian Coach of the Year in 1989.

Awards
Preceded by Győző Veres	Hungarian Sportsman of The Year; 1964	Succeeded by Gyula Zsivótzky
