= Udo Birnbaum =

Austrian modern pentathlete and fencer

Personal information
- Born: 8 February 1937 (age 89) Niederösterreich, Austria
- Height: 172 cm (5 ft 8 in)
- Weight: 65 kg (143 lb)

Sport
- Sport: Modern pentathlon, fencing

Udo Birnbaum (born 8 February 1937) is an Austrian modern pentathlete and fencer. He competed at the 1960, 1964 and 1968 Summer Olympics. His son, Axel Birnbaum, fenced at the 1988 Summer Olympics.
