= Alfonso Ottaviani =

Italian modern pentathlete (1937–2008)

Personal information
- Born: 5 October 1937 Terni, Italy
- Died: 3 March 2008 (aged 70)

Sport
- Sport: Modern pentathlon

Alfonso Ottaviani (5 October 1937 – 3 March 2008) was an Italian modern pentathlete. He competed at the 1964 Summer Olympics.
