= Juan José Castilla =

Mexican modern pentathlete (born 1945)

Personal information
- Born: 7 April 1945 (age 81)

Sport
- Sport: Modern pentathlon

Achievements and titles
- Olympic finals: 1972 Summer Olympics

Juan José Castilla (born 7 April 1945) is a Mexican modern pentathlete. He competed at the 1972 Summer Olympics.
