= Velko Bratanov =

Bulgarian modern pentathlete (born 1949)

Personal information
- Born: 26 July 1949 (age 76) Nova Zagora, Bulgaria

Sport
- Sport: Modern pentathlon

Velko Bratanov (Bulgarian: Велко Братанов, born 26 July 1949) is a Bulgarian former modern pentathlete. He competed at the 1972 and 1976 Summer Olympics.
