= Ryszard Wach =

Polish modern pentathlete

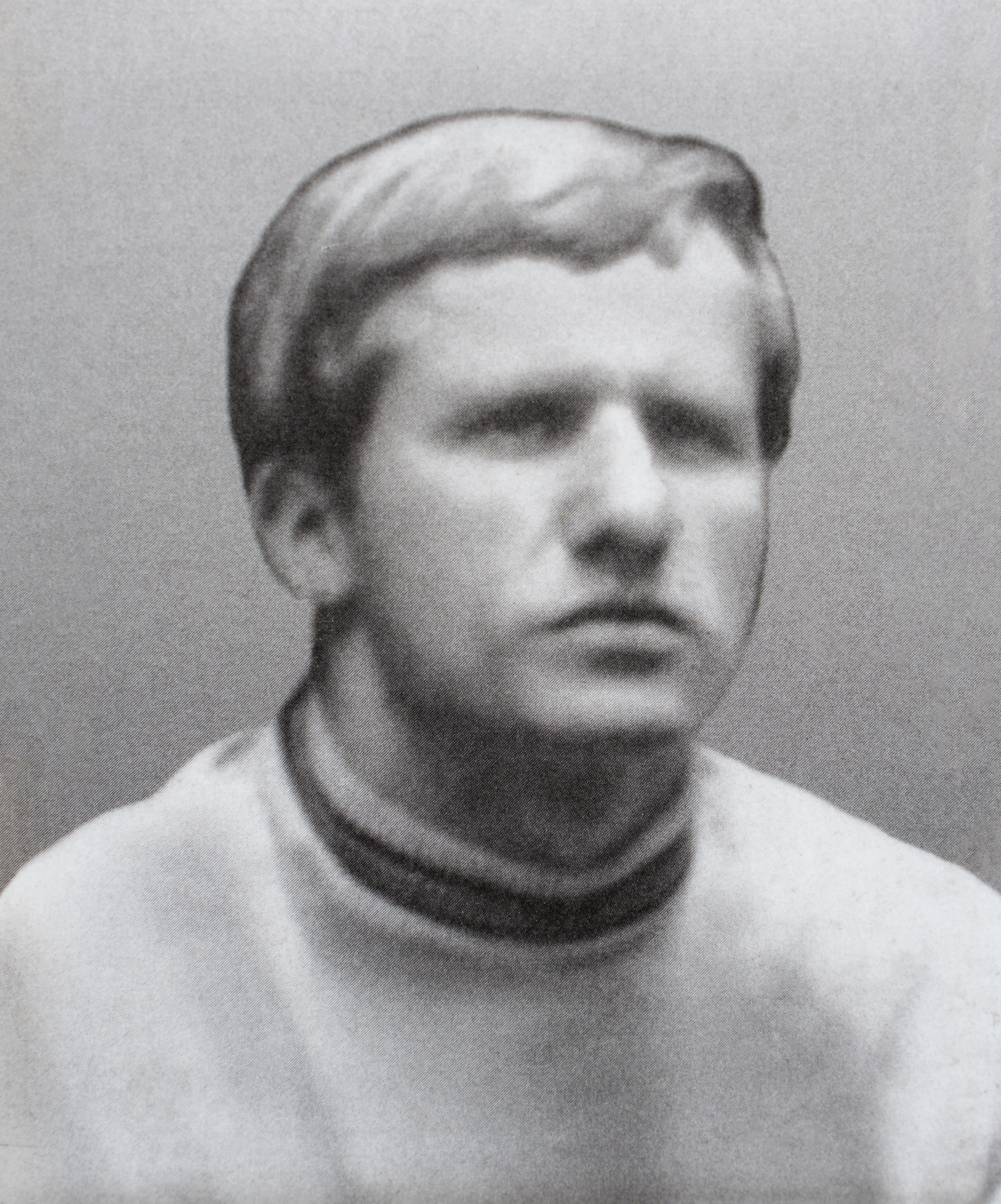

Personal information
- Born: 26 April 1946 (age 80) Pionki, Poland

Sport
- Sport: Modern pentathlon

Ryszard Wach (born 26 April 1946) is a Polish modern pentathlete. He competed at the 1972 Summer Olympics.
