= Rob Vonk =

Dutch modern pentathlete

Personal information
- Born: 26 April 1950 (age 76) The Hague, Netherlands

Sport
- Sport: Modern pentathlon

Rob Vonk (born 26 April 1950) is a Dutch modern pentathlete. He competed at the 1972 Summer Olympics.
