= Gilberto Toledano =

Mexican modern pentathlete (born 1946)

Personal information
- Born: 23 August 1946 (age 79)

Sport
- Sport: Modern pentathlon

Gilberto Toledano (born 23 August 1946) is a Mexican modern pentathlete. He competed at the 1972 Summer Olympics.
