= Michel Gueguen =

French modern pentathlete

Personal information
- Born: 27 February 1951 (age 75)

Sport
- Sport: Modern pentathlon

Michel Gueguen (born 27 February 1951) is a French modern pentathlete. He competed at the 1972 and 1976 Summer Olympics.
