= Henk Krediet =

Dutch modern pentathlete

Personal information
- Born: 22 July 1942 (age 84) Sneek, Netherlands

Sport
- Sport: Modern pentathlon

Henk Krediet (born 22 July 1942) is a Dutch modern pentathlete. He competed at the 1972 Summer Olympics.
