= Shigeaki Uchino =

Japanese modern pentathlete (1931–2017)

Personal information
- Born: 20 January 1931 Miyazaki Prefecture, Japan
- Died: 28 February 2017 (aged 86)

Sport
- Sport: Modern pentathlon

Shigeaki Uchino (内野 重昭, Uchino Shigeaki; 20 January 1931 – 28 February 2017) was a Japanese modern pentathlete. He competed at the 1960 and 1964 Summer Olympics.
