= René Heitmann =

Danish modern pentathlete

Personal information
- Born: 4 July 1942 (age 83) Frederiksberg, Denmark

Sport
- Sport: Modern pentathlon

René Heitmann (born 4 July 1942) is a Danish modern pentathlete. He competed at the 1972 Summer Olympics.
