= Wolfgang Gödicke =

German modern pentathlete

Personal information
- Born: 22 October 1934 (age 91) Berlin, Germany

Sport
- Sport: Modern pentathlon

Wolfgang Gödicke (born 22 October 1934) is a German modern pentathlete. He competed at the 1960 and 1964 Summer Olympics for the United Team of Germany.
