= Klaus Petersen =

Danish modern pentathlete (born 1951)

Personal information
- Born: 18 February 1951 (age 75) Aabenraa, Denmark

Sport
- Sport: Modern pentathlon

Klaus Petersen (born 18 February 1951) is a Danish modern pentathlete. He competed at the 1972 and 1976 Summer Olympics.
