= Choi Gwi-seung =

South Korean modern pentathlete

Personal information
- Born: 13 May 1941
- Died: 29 April 2025 (aged 83)

Sport
- Sport: Modern pentathlon

Korean name
- Hangul: 최귀승
- Hanja: 崔貴昇
- RR: Choe Gwiseung
- MR: Ch'oe Kwisŭng

Choi Gwi-seung (Korean: 최귀승, also Choi Kui-Seung, 13 May 1941 – 29 April 2025) was a South Korean modern pentathlete. He competed at the 1964 Summer Olympics.
