= Bruno Jerebicnik =

Austrian modern pentathlete

Personal information
- Born: 11 July 1947 (age 78)

Sport
- Sport: Modern pentathlon

Bruno Jerebicnik (born 11 July 1947) is an Austrian modern pentathlete. He competed at the 1972 Summer Olympics.
