= Marian Cosmescu =

Romanian modern pentathlete

Personal information
- Born: 3 October 1950 (age 75) Bucharest, Romania

Sport
- Sport: Modern pentathlon

Marian Cosmescu (born 3 October 1950) is a Romanian modern pentathlete. He competed at the 1972 Summer Olympics.
