= Beat Ganz =

Swiss modern pentathlete

Personal information
- Born: 29 April 1946 (age 80)

Sport
- Sport: Modern pentathlon

Beat Ganz (born 29 April 1946) is a Swiss modern pentathlete. He competed at the 1972 Summer Olympics.
