= Giovanni Perugini =

Italian modern pentathlete (born 1945)

Personal information
- Born: 10 October 1945 (age 80) Città di Castello, Italy

Sport
- Sport: Modern pentathlon

Giovanni Perugini (born 10 October 1945) is an Italian modern pentathlete. He competed at the 1972 Summer Olympics.
