= Jan Bekkenk =

Dutch modern pentathlete (born 1949)

Personal information
- Born: 29 March 1949 (age 77) Schoonhoven, Netherlands

Sport
- Sport: Modern pentathlon

Jan Bekkenk (born 29 March 1949) is a Dutch modern pentathlete. He competed at the 1972 Summer Olympics.
