= Eduardo Florez =

Mexican modern pentathlete (born 1944)

Personal information
- Born: 20 September 1944 (age 82)

Sport
- Sport: Modern pentathlon

Eduardo Florez (born 20 September 1944) is a Mexican modern pentathlete. He competed at the 1964 Summer Olympics.
