= Urs Hugi =

Swiss modern pentathlete

Personal information
- Born: 25 July 1952 (age 73)

Sport
- Sport: Modern pentathlon

Urs Hugi (born 25 July 1952) is a Swiss modern pentathlete. He competed at the 1972 Summer Olympics.
