= Scott Taylor (pentathlete) =

American modern pentathlete (1945–2023)

Personal information
- Born: May 8, 1945 Portland, Oregon, U.S.
- Died: September 14, 2023 (aged 78)

Sport
- Sport: Modern pentathlon

Scott Taylor (May 8, 1945 – September 14, 2023) was an American modern pentathlete. He competed at the 1972 Summer Olympics. Taylor died on September 14, 2023, at the age of 78.

Married to Elizabeth Ann Richmond, October 11th 1947. They have one son Matthew Scott Taylor born February 10th, 1984.
