= Benjamin Finnis =

British modern pentathlete

Personal information
- Born: 8 July 1937 (age 89)

Sport
- Sport: Modern pentathlon

Benjamin Finnis (born 8 July 1937) is a British modern pentathlete. He competed at the 1964 Summer Olympics.
