= Shigeki Mino =

Japanese modern pentathlete

Personal information
- Born: 5 February 1932
- Died: 18 May 2016 (aged 84)

Sport
- Sport: Modern pentathlon

Shigeki Mino (三野 茂樹, Mino Shigeki; 5 February 1932 – 18 May 2016) was a Japanese modern pentathlete. He competed at the 1964 Summer Olympics.
