= Angel Pepelyankov =

Bulgarian modern pentathlete

Personal information
- Born: 28 April 1949 (age 77) Pazardzhik, Bulgaria

Sport
- Sport: Modern pentathlon

Angel Pepelyankov (Bulgarian: Ангел Пепелянков, born 28 April 1949) is a Bulgarian modern pentathlete. He competed at the 1972 Summer Olympics.
