= Adalbert Covacs =

Romanian modern pentathlete

Personal information
- Born: 19 June 1947 (age 79) Târgu Mureș, Romania

Sport
- Sport: Modern pentathlon

Adalbert Covacs (born 19 June 1947) is a Romanian modern pentathlete who competed at the 1972 Summer Olympics. He is also known as Adalbert Covaci or Albert Covaci.
