= Masaru Sakano =

Japanese modern pentathlete

Personal information
- Born: 20 March 1942 (age 84)

Sport
- Sport: Modern pentathlon

Masaru Sakano (坂野 勝, Sakano Masaru; born 20 March 1942) is a Japanese modern pentathlete. He competed at the 1972 Summer Olympics.
