= David Bárcena Ríos =

Mexican equestrian (1941–2017)

Personal information
- Born: 26 December 1941 Celaya, Guanajuato, Mexico
- Died: 22 February 2017 (aged 75)

Sport
- Sport: Modern pentathlon Three days event Ecuestrian
Medal record
Equestrian
Representing Mexico
Olympic Games
Bronze medal – third place	1980 Moscow	Team eventing
Pan American Games
Bronze medal – third place	1975 Mexico City	Individual eventing
Bronze medal – third place	1975 Mexico City	Team eventing

David Roberto Bárcena Ríos (26 December 1941 – 22 February 2017) was a Mexican equestrian who competed at five Olympic Games. He competed in the Modern Pentathlon at the 1964 and 1968 Olympics and in Eventing at the 1972, 1976 and 1980 Olympics. At his fifth Olympics, he won bronze in the Team Event.

== Early years ==
He was born in Celaya, Guanajuato in 1941. His father was a merchant. He began playing football while in secondary school, and later entered the Heroico Colegio Militar at the age of 18, graduating from the institution on January 1, 1963, with the rank of Second Lieutenant of Cavalry.

== Sports career ==
He represented Mexico in the Modern pentathlon at the Olympic Games: Tokyo 1964, Mexico City 1968, and Munich 1972, and later competed in Montreal 1976 and Moscow 1980 in equestrian sports. At his fifth Olympic Games, he won the bronze medal in the Team Event.

He also competed at the 1971 Pan American Games held in Cali, Colombia, and the 1975 Pan American Games held in Mexico City, Mexico, winning two bronze medals in the individual and team events in the latter. Nationally, he participated in numerous competitions and championships in Modern Pentathlon, Fencing, Equestrian, and Shooting.
