= Hans Müller (pentathlete) =

Swiss modern pentathlete (born 1947)

Personal information
- Full name: Hans Müller
- Nationality: Swiss
- Born: May 24, 1947 (age 79)
- Height: 1.73 m (5 ft 8 in)

Sport
- Country: Switzerland
- Sport: Modern Pentathlon
- Event(s): Individual, Team
- Club: Fechtclub Zug

Hans Müller (born 24 May 1947) is a Swiss former modern pentathlete.

Müller competed at the 1972 Summer Olympics in the individual and team events. He placed 45th in the individual, and his team placed 15th.
