= Elmar Frings =

German modern pentathlete

Personal information
- Born: 26 March 1939 Neuss, Germany
- Died: 29 July 2002 (aged 63) Neuss, Germany

Sport
- Sport: Modern pentathlon

Elmar Frings (26 March 1939 – 29 July 2002) was a German modern pentathlete. He competed for the United Team of Germany at the 1964 Summer Olympics and for West Germany at the 1968 Summer Olympics.
