= Björn Ferm =

Swedish modern pentathlete

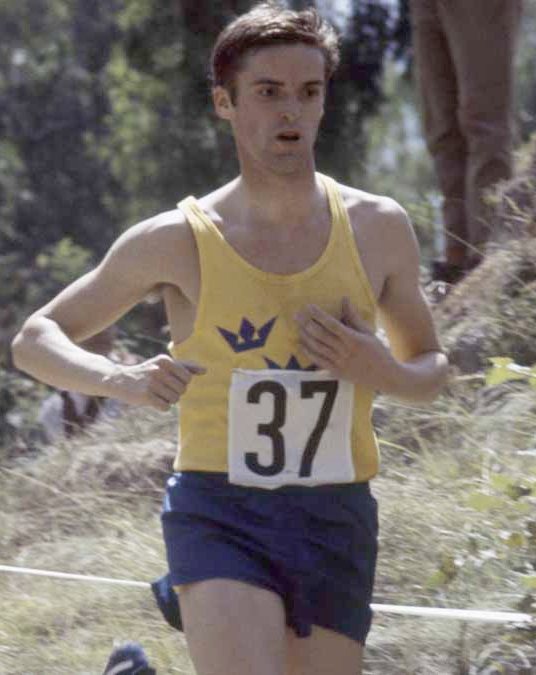
- Björn Ferm at the 1968 Summer Olympics in Mexico

Personal information
- Nationality: Swedish
- Born: 10 August 1944 (age 81) Jönköping, Sweden
- Height: 1.80 m (5 ft 11 in)
- Weight: 72 kg (159 lb)

Sport
- Country: Sweden
- Sport: Modern pentathlon, fencing
- Club: A6 IF, Jönköping
Medal record
Representing Sweden
Olympic Games
Gold medal – first place	1968 Mexico City	Individual
World Championships
Silver medal – second place	1967 Jönköping	Team
Bronze medal – third place	1967 Jönköping	Individual
Bronze medal – third place	1969 Budapest	Individual

Björn Bernt Ewald Ferm (born 10 August 1944) is a Swedish modern pentathlete. He competed at the 1968 and 1972 Summer Olympics and won an individual gold medal in 1968. In 1968, his team finished third but was stripped of the bronze medal after one member failed a drug test (for alcohol).

Ferm won two individual bronze medals at world championships, in 1967 and 1969. Nationally he collected 12 titles that included one in épée fencing and 11 in modern pentathlon, five individual and six with a team. After retiring from competitions he became an Asia-based businessman, and as of 2009 headed a company exporting ink cartridges and toners.
