= Wolfgang Lüderitz (pentathlete) =

German modern pentathlete

Personal information
- Born: 8 May 1936 (age 90) Schleswig-Holstein, Germany

Sport
- Sport: Modern pentathlon

Wolfgang Lüderitz (born 8 May 1936) is a German modern pentathlete. He competed for East Germany at the 1968 Summer Olympics.
