= Mario Medda =

Italian modern pentathlete (1943–1981)

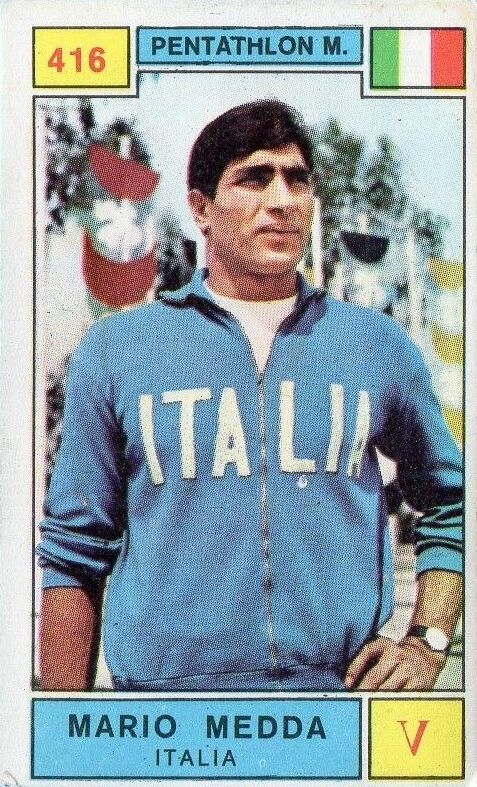
- Mario Medda c. 1969

Personal information
- Born: 4 March 1943 Santadi, Italy
- Died: 12 July 1980 (aged 37)
- Height: 1.79 m (5 ft 10 in)
- Weight: 70 kg (150 lb)

Sport
- Sport: Modern pentathlon

Mario Medda (4 March 1943 – 12 July 1980) was an Italian modern pentathlete. He competed at the 1968, 1972 and 1976 Summer Olympics in the individual and team events with the best result of sixth place with the Italian team in 1976.
