= Albert Mokeyev =

Soviet modern pentathlete (1936–1969)

Personal information
- Born: 4 January 1936 Vladimir, Russian SFSR, Soviet Union
- Died: 27 February 1969 (aged 33) Moscow, Russian SFSR, Soviet Union

Sport
- Sport: Modern pentathlon
Medal record
Men's modern pentathlon
Representing Soviet Union
Olympic Games
| Gold medal – first place | 1964 Tokyo | Team |
| Bronze medal – third place | 1964 Tokyo | Individual |

Albert Mokeyev (4 January 1936 – 27 February 1969) is a former Soviet modern pentathlete and Olympic Champion. He competed at the 1964 Summer Olympics in Tokyo, where he won a gold medal in the team competition (together with Igor Novikov and Viktor Mineyev), and a bronze medal in the individual competition.
