= Eduardo Olivera =

Mexican modern pentathlete (born 1945)

Personal information
- Born: 17 July 1945 (age 80) Mexico City, Mexico

Sport
- Sport: Modern pentathlon

Eduardo Olivera (born 17 July 1945) is a Mexican modern pentathlete. He competed at the 1968 and 1972 Summer Olympics.
