= Yoshihide Fukutome =

Japanese modern pentathlete (1933–2022)

Personal information
- Born: March 10, 1933
- Died: January 5, 2022 (aged 88)

Sport
- Sport: Modern pentathlon

Yoshihide Fukutome (福留 義秀, Fukutome Yoshihide; 10 March 1933 - January 5, 2022) is a Japanese former modern pentathlete. He competed at the 1964 Summer Olympics.
