= Nicolo Deligia =

Italian modern pentathlete (born 1940)

Personal information
- Born: 17 April 1940 (age 86) Tadasuni, Italy

Sport
- Sport: Modern pentathlon

Nicolo Deligia (born 17 April 1940) is an Italian modern pentathlete. He competed at the 1968 and 1972 Summer Olympics.
