= Paul Pesthy =

Modern pentathlete and fencer

Paul Karoly Pesthy
Personal information
- Born: March 25, 1938 Budapest, Hungary
- Died: October 28, 2008 (aged 70) San Antonio, Texas, United States

Sport
- Sport: Modern pentathlon, Fencing
Medal record
Men's Modern pentathlon
Representing United States
Olympic Games
Silver medal – second place	1964 Tokyo	Team

Paul Karoly Pesthy (March 25, 1938 – October 28, 2008) was an American modern pentathlete and épée fencer. He was born in Hungary and emigrated to the United States in 1958.

== Competitions ==
He was a member of the U.S. Olympic modern pentathlon team and won a silver medal in the team event at the 1964 Summer Olympics. He also qualified for the 1968 Olympic team. He was USFA/AFLA national épée champion (1964, 1966, 1967, 1968, 1983) and was a member of the U.S. Olympic fencing team in 1964, 1968, 1976 and 1980. Although Pesthy qualified for the 1980 Olympic fencing team he did not compete due to the Olympic Committee's boycott of the 1980 Summer Olympics in Moscow, Russia. He was one of 461 athletes to receive a Congressional Gold Medal instead. He won the World Team Bronze in 1962 and 1963. He was IFA épée champion (1964) and two-time NCAA épée champion in 1964 and 1965 for Rutgers University. He is a member of the United States Fencing Association Hall of Fame.

== See also ==
- List of USFA Division I National Champions
- List of NCAA fencing champions
- List of USFA Hall of Fame members
