= Rudolf Trost =

Austrian fencer

Personal information
- Born: 27 August 1940 (age 85) Graz, Nazi Germany (now Austria)
- Height: 184 cm (6 ft 0 in)
- Weight: 82 kg (181 lb)

Sport
- Sport: Fencing, modern pentathlon

Rudolf Trost (born 27 August 1940) is an Austrian épée and foil fencer and modern pentathlete. He competed at the 1964, 1968 and 1972 Summer Olympics.
