= Dumitru Spîrlea =

Romanian modern pentathlete

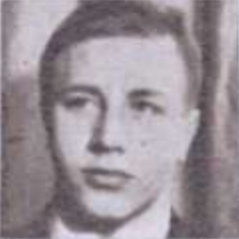
- Dumitru Spîrlea in 1968

Personal information
- Born: 10 November 1950 (age 75) Bucharest, Romania

Sport
- Sport: Modern pentathlon

Dumitru Spîrlea (born 10 November 1950) is a Romanian modern pentathlete. He competed at the 1972 and 1980 Summer Olympics.
