= Peter Macken =

Australian modern pentathlete and fencer

Personal information
- Born: 10 November 1938 (age 87) Sydney, Australia

Sport
- Sport: Modern pentathlon, fencing

Peter Neville Macken (born 10 November 1938 in Sydney, Australia) is an Australian modern pentathlete and fencer who competed in five Olympic Games. He competed in the modern pentathlon at all five Olympics from 1960 to 1976 and in fencing at the 1968 Olympics.

His best position was fourth at the 1964 Olympics Modern Pentathlon.

== See also ==
- List of athletes with the most appearances at Olympic Games
- Dual sport and multi-sport Olympians
