= Enrique Padilla (pentathlete) =

Mexican modern pentathlete (born 1934)

Personal information
- Born: 23 August 1934 (age 91)

Sport
- Sport: Modern pentathlon

Enrique Padilla (born 23 August 1934) is a Mexican modern pentathlete. He competed at the 1964 Summer Olympics.
