= Heiner Thade =

Modern pentathlete

Personal information
- Born: 15 September 1942 (age 83) Lüdinghausen, Germany

Sport
- Sport: Modern pentathlon

Heiner Thade (born 15 September 1942) is a German modern pentathlete. He competed for West Germany at the 1968 and 1972 Summer Olympics.
