= Barry Lillywhite =

British modern pentathlete

Personal information
- Born: 4 May 1946 (age 80) Brighton, England

Sport
- Sport: Modern pentathlon

Barry Lillywhite (born 4 May 1946) is a British modern pentathlete. He competed at the 1968 and 1972 Summer Olympics.
