= Donald McMiken =

Australian modern pentathlete

Personal information
- Born: 20 May 1942 (age 84) Australia

Sport
- Sport: Modern pentathlon

Donald Fraser McMiken (born 20 May 1942) is an Australian modern pentathlete. He competed at the 1964 and 1968 Summer Olympics.
