= Rolf Junefelt =

Swedish modern pentathlete

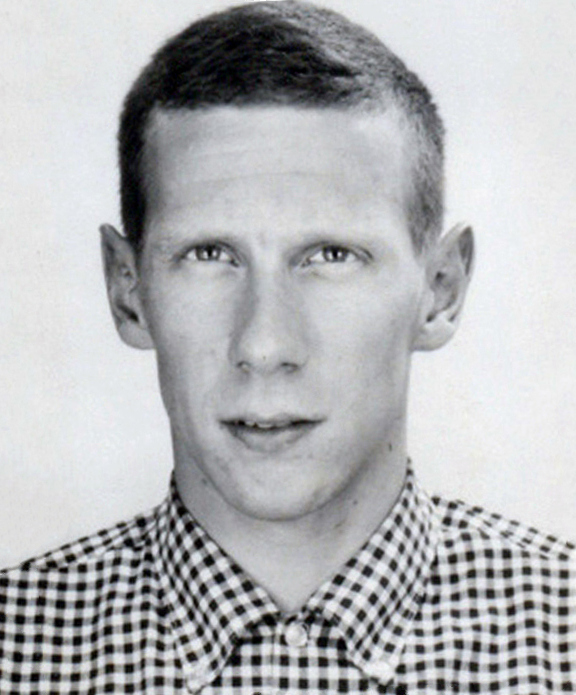

Personal information
- Born: 15 May 1938 (age 88) Jönköping, Sweden
- Height: 190 cm (6 ft 3 in)
- Weight: 78 kg (172 lb)

Sport
- Sport: Modern pentathlon
- Club: A6 IF, Jönköping

Rolf Ingmar Junefelt (born 15 May 1938) is a Swedish modern pentathlete who competed at the 1964 Summer Olympics. He finished tenth individually and fourth with the Swedish team.
