= Kenneth Maaten =

Canadian modern pentathlete (born 1953)

Personal information
- Born: 3 March 1953 (age 73) Sarnia, Ontario, Canada

Sport
- Sport: Modern pentathlon

Kenneth Maaten (born 3 March 1953) is a Canadian modern pentathlete. He competed at the 1972 Summer Olympics.
