= Jørn Steffensen =

Danish modern pentathlete

Personal information
- Born: 20 September 1944 (age 81) Helsingør, Denmark

Sport
- Sport: Modern pentathlon

Jørn Steffensen (born 20 September 1944) is a Danish modern pentathlete. He competed at the 1968, 1972 and 1976 Summer Olympics.
