= Yuso Makihira =

Japanese modern pentathlete

Personal information
- Born: 15 January 1944 (age 82) Hiroshima, Japan

Sport
- Sport: Modern pentathlon

Yuso Makihira (槇平 勇荘, Makihira Yūsō; born 15 January 1944) is a Japanese modern pentathlete. He competed at the 1968 and 1972 Summer Olympics.
