= Wolfgang Leu =

Austrian modern pentathlete

Personal information
- Born: 8 February 1945 Vienna, Nazi Germany
- Died: 4 March 2025 (aged 80)

Sport
- Sport: Modern pentathlon

Wolfgang Leu (8 February 1945 – 4 March 2025) was an Austrian modern pentathlete. He competed at the 1968 Mexico City Olympics and the 1972 Muchen Olympics. He was born in Vienna.
