= Kari Kaaja =

Finnish modern pentathlete (1941–2025)

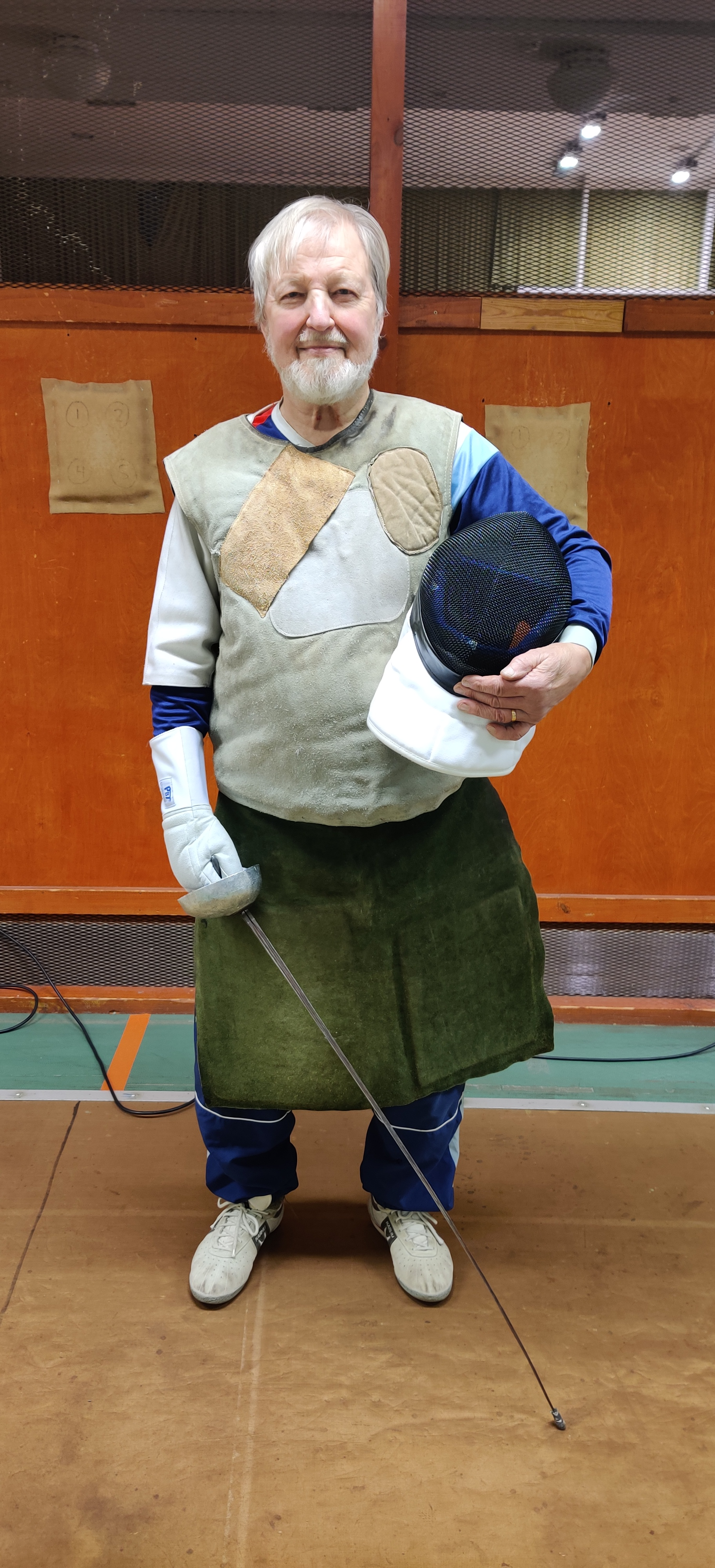

Personal information
- Born: 6 April 1941 Helsinki, Finland
- Died: 20 April 2025 (aged 84)

Sport
- Sport: Modern pentathlon

Kari Kaaja (6 April 1941 – 20 April 2025) was a Finnish modern pentathlete. He competed at the 1964 Summer Olympics.
