= Keijo Vanhala =

Finnish modern pentathlete

Personal information
- Born: 7 July 1940 Helsinki, Finland
- Died: 5 June 2003 (aged 62) Jyväskylä, Finland

Sport
- Sport: Modern pentathlon

Keijo Vanhala (7 July 1940 – 5 June 2003) was a Finnish modern pentathlete. He competed at the 1964 Summer Olympics.
