= Jorma Hotanen =

Finnish modern pentathlete

Personal information
- Born: 15 September 1936 Merikarvia, Finland
- Died: 20 February 2018 (aged 81)

Sport
- Sport: Modern pentathlon

Jorma Hotanen (15 September 1936 – 20 February 2018) was a Finnish modern pentathlete. He competed at the 1964 and 1968 Summer Olympics.
