= Aquilles Gloffka =

Chilean fencer and modern pentathlete

Personal information
- Born: 3 January 1937 (age 89)

Sport
- Sport: Fencing, modern pentathlon

Aquilles Gloffka (born 3 January 1937) is a Chilean épée fencer and modern pentathlete. He competed at the 1964 Summer Olympics.
