= Uwe Adler =

German modern pentathlete (born 1944)

Personal information
- Born: 30 May 1944 (age 82) Halle an der Saale, Germany

Sport
- Sport: Modern pentathlon

Uwe Adler (born 30 May 1944) is a German modern pentathlete. He competed at the 1964 Summer Olympics for the United Team of Germany.
