= Robert Phelps (pentathlete) =

British modern pentathlete

Personal information
- Born: 22 July 1939 (age 87) Gloucester, England

Sport
- Sport: Modern pentathlon

Robert Phelps (born 22 July 1939) is a British modern pentathlete. He competed at the 1964, 1968 and 1972 Summer Olympics.

Phelps was appointed a Member of the Order of the British Empire (MBE) in the 1981 Birthday Honours for services to modern pentathlon.
