= Bo Jansson =

Swedish modern pentathlete

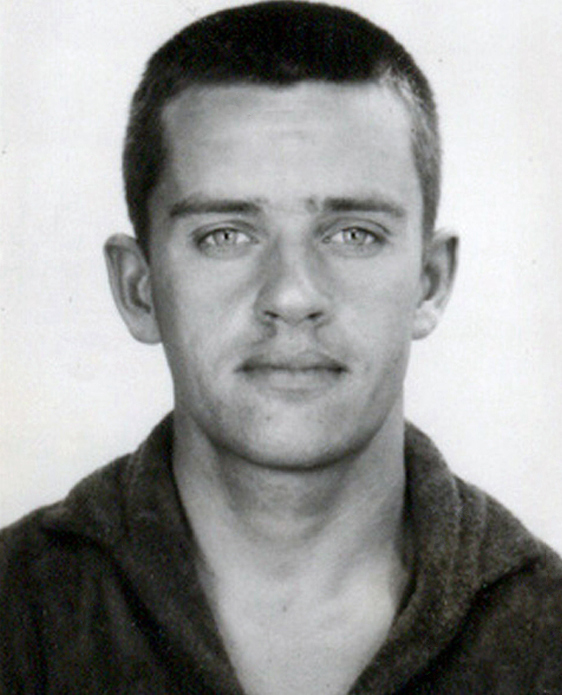

Personal information
- Born: 20 April 1937 (age 89) Uppsala, Sweden
- Height: 175 cm (5 ft 9 in)
- Weight: 62 kg (137 lb)

Sport
- Sport: Modern pentathlon
- Club: F20 IF, Uppsala

Bo Jansson (born 20 April 1937) is a Swedish modern pentathlete who competed at the 1964 and 1972 Summer Olympics. In 1964 he finished eighth individually and fourth with the team, and in 1972 he placed 24th and fifth, respectively.
