= Hans-Gunnar Liljenwall =

Swedish modern pentathlete

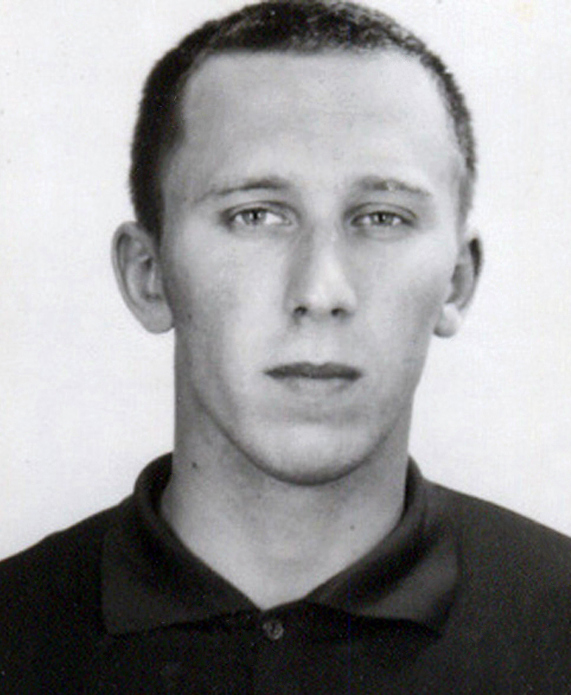
- Hans-Gunnar Liljenwall in the mid 1960's

Personal information
- Full name: Hans-Gunnar Liljenwall
- Born: 9 July 1941 (age 84) Jönköping, Sweden
- Height: 188 cm (6 ft 2 in)
- Weight: 74 kg (163 lb)

Sport
- Sport: Modern pentathlon
- Club: A6 IF, Jönköping
Medal record
Representing Sweden
World championships
| Silver medal – second place | 1967 Jönköping | Team |

Hans-Gunnar Liljenwall (born 9 July 1941) is a former Swedish modern pentathlete who caused the disqualification of the Swedish team at the 1968 Summer Olympics for alcohol use.

== Career ==
Liljenwall was the first athlete to be disqualified at the Olympics for drug use, following the introduction of anti-doping regulations by the International Olympic Committee in 1967. Liljenwall reportedly had "two beers" to calm his nerves before the pistol shooting event. The Swedish team eventually had to return their bronze medals.

Although claims vary, alcohol was on at least one list of restricted substances released by the International Olympic Committee in advance of the 1968 Summer Olympics.

Liljenwall also participated in the 1964 and 1972 Olympics. In 1964 he finished 11th individually and fourth with the team, and in 1972 he placed 25th and fifth, respectively.

== See also ==
- List of sportspeople sanctioned for doping offences
