= Sweden at the Olympics =

- IOC code: SWE
- NOC: Swedish Olympic Committee
- Website: www.sok.se (in Swedish and English)
- Medals Ranked 9th: Gold 224 Silver 238 Bronze 247 Total 709

Summer appearances
- 1896; 1900; 1904; 1908; 1912; 1920; 1924; 1928; 1932; 1936; 1948; 1952; 1956; 1960; 1964; 1968; 1972; 1976; 1980; 1984; 1988; 1992; 1996; 2000; 2004; 2008; 2012; 2016; 2020; 2024; 2028

Winter appearances
- 1924; 1928; 1932; 1936; 1948; 1952; 1956; 1960; 1964; 1968; 1972; 1976; 1980; 1984; 1988; 1992; 1994; 1998; 2002; 2006; 2010; 2014; 2018; 2022; 2026

Other related appearances
- 1906 Intercalated Games

Sweden first participated at the Olympic Games at the inaugural 1896 Games, and has sent athletes to compete in every Games since then with one exception, the sparsely attended 1904 Summer Olympics. Sweden has earned medals at all Olympic games except for two, the 1896 Games and the 1904 Games (the latter of which Sweden did not compete at). Sweden is the country with the longest Olympic Games medalling streak in history, having earned medals at every Olympic game since 1908.

Sweden hosted the Games on one occasion, the 1912 Summer Olympics in Stockholm. Additionally however, the Equestrian events at the 1956 Summer Olympics in Melbourne were held earlier that year in Stockholm, due to quarantine reasons, due to Australian quarantine laws.

At the 1900 Paris Olympic Games (Games of the II Olympiad), Ernst Fast became the first Swedish athlete to win an Olympic medal, earning bronze in the men's marathon. Later, at the 1908 London Olympic Games (Games of the IV Olympiad), Oscar Swahn made history as Sweden's first Olympic gold medalist, winning the men's 100m running deer single shots shooting event.

Swedish athletes have won a total of 514 medals at the Summer Olympic Games, and another 195 at the Winter Olympic Games. In addition to its sporting achievements, Sweden have won medals in one of the three discontinued Olympic non-sport competitions, winning two gold and two bronze medals at the art competitions.

The International Olympic Committee had Swedish officer and sports instructor Viktor Balck as one of its original members. The Swedish Olympic Committee was created and recognized in 1913.

== Medal tables ==
=== Medals by Summer Games ===
Host country

Games	Athletes	Gold	Silver	Bronze	Total	Rank
(Kingdom of Greece) 1896 Athens	1	0	0	0	0	–
(French Third Republic) 1900 Paris	10	0	0	1	1	20
(United States) 1904 St. Louis	did not participate					
(United Kingdom) 1908 London	168	8	6	11	25	3
(Sweden) 1912 Stockholm	444	23	25	17	65	2
(Belgium) 1920 Antwerp	260	19	20	25	64	2
(French Third Republic) 1924 Paris	159	4	13	12	29	8
(Netherlands) 1928 Amsterdam	100	7	6	12	25	4
(United States) 1932 Los Angeles	81	9	5	9	23	4
(Nazi Germany) 1936 Berlin	171	6	5	9	20	7
(United Kingdom) 1948 London	181	16	11	17	44	2
(Finland) 1952 Helsinki	206	12	13	10	35	4
(Australia) 1956 Melbourne	97	8	5	6	19	6
(Italy) 1960 Rome	134	1	2	3	6	16
(Japan) 1964 Tokyo	94	2	2	4	8	17
1968 Mexico City	100	2	1	1	4	20
(West Germany) 1972 Munich	131	4	6	6	16	11
(Canada) 1976 Montreal	116	4	1	0	5	12
(Soviet Union) 1980 Moscow	145	3	3	6	12	11
(United States) 1984 Los Angeles	174	2	11	6	19	16
(South Korea) 1988 Seoul	185	0	4	7	11	32
(Spain) 1992 Barcelona	187	1	7	4	12	27
(United States) 1996 Atlanta	177	2	4	2	8	29
(Australia) 2000 Sydney	150	4	5	3	12	18
(Greece) 2004 Athens	115	4	2	1	7	19
(China) 2008 Beijing	124	0	4	1	5	55
(United Kingdom) 2012 London	134	1	4	3	8	37
(Brazil) 2016 Rio de Janeiro	152	2	6	3	11	29
(Japan) 2020 Tokyo	136	3	6	0	9	23
(France) 2024 Paris	118	4	4	3	11	16
(United States) 2028 Los Angeles	future event					
(Australia) 2032 Brisbane	future event					
Total (29/30)	4,250	151	181	182	514	12

=== Medals by Winter Games ===
Games	Athletes	Gold	Silver	Bronze	Total	Rank
(France) 1924 Chamonix	31	1	1	0	2	7
(Switzerland) 1928 St. Moritz	24	2	2	1	5	3
(United States) 1932 Lake Placid	12	1	2	0	3	3
(Nazi Germany) 1936 Garmisch-Partenkirchen	32	2	2	3	7	3
(Switzerland) 1948 St. Moritz	43	4	3	3	10	1
(Norway) 1952 Oslo	65	0	0	4	4	10
(Italy) 1956 Cortina d'Ampezzo	58	2	4	4	10	5
(United States) 1960 Squaw Valley	47	3	2	2	7	5
(Austria) 1964 Innsbruck	57	3	3	1	7	7
(France) 1968 Grenoble	68	3	2	3	8	7
(Japan) 1972 Sapporo	58	1	1	2	4	10
(Austria) 1976 Innsbruck	39	0	0	2	2	14
(United States) 1980 Lake Placid	61	3	0	1	4	5
(Socialist Federal Republic of Yugoslavia) 1984 Sarajevo	60	4	2	2	8	5
(Canada) 1988 Calgary	67	4	0	2	6	5
(France) 1992 Albertville	73	1	0	3	4	13
(Norway) 1994 Lillehammer	84	2	1	0	3	10
(Japan) 1998 Nagano	99	0	2	1	3	17
(United States) 2002 Salt Lake City	102	0	2	5	7	19
(Italy) 2006 Turin	106	7	2	5	14	6
(Canada) 2010 Vancouver	106	5	2	5	12	7
(Russia) 2014 Sochi	106	2	7	6	15	14
(South Korea) 2018 Pyeongchang	116	7	6	1	14	6
(China) 2022 Beijing	116	8	5	5	18	5
(Italy) 2026 Milano Cortina	110	8	6	4	18	7
(France) 2030 French Alps	future event					
(United States) 2034 Utah	future event					
Total (25/25)	1,740	73	57	65	195	7

=== Medals overall ===
Best Summer Games era was from 1908 to 1952 where they always reached 20+ medals. Best Winter Games era was from 2006 to 2022 where they always reached 10+ medals.

Games	Gold	Silver	Bronze	Total	Rank
Summer Olympics	151	181	182	514	12
Winter Olympics	73	57	65	195	7
Total	224	238	247	709	9

=== Medals by summer sport ===
Sport	Gold	Silver	Bronze	Total
Wrestling	28	27	31	86
Athletics	21	23	41	85
Equestrian	18	13	14	45
Shooting	15	25	18	58
Canoeing	15	11	4	30
Swimming	11	16	14	41
Sailing	10	15	14	39
Modern pentathlon	9	7	5	21
Diving	6	8	7	21
Gymnastics	5	2	1	8
Cycling	4	5	9	18
Fencing	2	3	2	7
Table tennis	1	3	1	5
Football	1	2	2	5
Beach volleyball	1	0	0	1
Tug of war	1	0	0	1
Boxing	0	5	6	11
Handball	0	4	0	4
Tennis	0	3	5	8
Archery	0	2	0	2
Rowing	0	2	0	2
Water polo	0	1	2	3
Golf	0	1	0	1
Triathlon	0	1	0	1
Weightlifting	0	0	4	4
Judo	0	0	1	1
Totals (26 entries)	148	179	181	508

*This table does not include six medals – three gold, two silver, and one bronze – awarded in the 1908 and 1920 figure skating events.

Best results in non-medalling sports:

Sport	Rank	Athlete	Event & year
Artistic swimming	9th	Marie Jacobsson	Women's solo in 1988
Badminton	5th	Catrine Bengtsson and Maria Bengtsson	Women's doubles in 1992
Badminton	5th	Fredrik Bergström and Johanna Persson	Mixed doubles in 2004
Basketball	10th	Sweden men's	Men's team in 1980
Canoe slalom	9th	Erik Holmer	Men's K1 in 2020
Indoor volleyball	7th	Sweden men's national volleyball team	Men's event in 1988
Rhythmic gymnastics	19th	Viktoria Bengtsson	Women's individual all-around in 1984
Skateboarding	9th	Hampus Winberg	Men's park in 2024
Taekwondo	4th	Roman Livaja	Men's middleweight in 2000
Track cycling	5th	Andrew Hansson	Men's 20 km in 1908

=== Medals by winter sport ===
Sport	Gold	Silver	Bronze	Total
Cross country skiing	37	31	26	94
Speed skating	9	4	5	18
Alpine skiing	8	3	10	21
Biathlon	7	7	8	22
Curling	6	3	4	13
Figure skating	5	3	2	10
Ice hockey	2	4	5	11
Freestyle skiing	2	1	4	7
Nordic combined	0	1	1	2
Ski jumping	0	1	1	2
Snowboarding	0	1	0	1
Totals (11 entries)	76	59	66	201

*This table includes six medals – three gold, two silver, and one bronze – awarded in the 1908 and 1920 figure skating events.

Best results in non-medalling sports:

Sport	Rank	Athlete	Event & year
Bobsleigh	6th	Fernström, Holmström, Landgren, Lapidoth	Men's four-man in 1952
Bobsleigh	6th	Carl-Erik Eriksson and Jan Johansson	Men's two-man in 1972
Luge	6th	Hans Kohala and Carl-Johan Lindqvist	Men's doubles in 1992
Short track speed skating	7th	Martin Johansson	Men's 500 metres in 1994

== Individual statistics ==
=== Most medals ===
According to official data of the Swedish Olympic Committee. This is a list of people who have won three or more Olympic gold medals for Sweden. Medals won in the 1906 Intercalated Games are not included. It includes top-three placings in 1896 and 1900, before medals were awarded for top-three placings.

Athlete	Sport	Years	Games	Gender	Gold	Silver	Bronze	Total
Gert Fredriksson	Canoeing	1948–1960	Summer	M	6	1	1	8
Sixten Jernberg	Cross-country skiing	1956–1964	Winter	M	4	3	2	9
Gunde Svan	Cross-country skiing	1984–1988	Winter	M	4	1	1	6
Henri Saint Cyr	Equestrian	1936–1960	Summer	M	4	0	0	4
Thomas Wassberg	Cross-country skiing	1976–1988	Winter	M	4	0	0	4
Charlotte Kalla	Cross-country skiing	2010–2018	Winter	W	3	6	0	9
Wilhelm Carlberg	Shooting	1908–1924	Summer	M	3	4	0	7
Alfred Swahn	Shooting	1908–1924	Summer	M	3	3	3	9
Agneta Andersson	Canoeing	1980–1996	Summer	W	3	2	2	7
Sarah Sjöström	Swimming	2016–2024	Summer	W	3	2	1	6
Oscar Swahn	Shooting	1908–1920	Summer	M	3	1	2	6
Gillis Grafström	Figure skating	1920–1932	Winter	M	3	1	0	4
Tomas Gustafson	Speed skating	1980–1992	Winter	M	3	1	0	4
Marcus Hellner	Cross-country skiing	2010–2014	Winter	M	3	1	0	4
Ivar Johansson	Wrestling	1928–1936	Summer	M	3	0	0	3
Eric Lemming	Athletics	1900–1912	Summer	M	3	0	0	3
Daniel Norling	Equestrian / Gymnastics	1908–1920	Summer	M	3	0	0	3
Carl Westergren	Wrestling	1920–1932	Summer	M	3	0	0	3

=== Most appearances ===
Athlete	Sport	Years	Games	Gender	No. of part.
Kerstin Palm	Fencing	1964–1988	Summer	W	7
Ragnar Skanåker	Shooting	1972–1996	Summer	M	7
Jörgen Persson	Table tennis	1988–2012	Summer	M	7
Tinne Vilhelmson-Silfvén	Equestrian	1992–2016	Summer	W	7
Carl-Erik Eriksson	Bobsleigh	1964–1984	Winter	M	6
Fredrik Lööf	Sailing	1992–2012	Summer	M	6
Lars Frölander	Swimming	1992–2012	Summer	M	6
Therese Alshammar	Swimming	1996–2016	Summer	W	6

=== Age records ===
Record	Athlete	Age	Games	Sport	Event
Oldest medalist	Oscar Swahn	72 years, 279 days	1920 Summer Olympics	Shooting	Men's 100 metre team running deer, double shots
Oldest medalist	Carl August Kronlund	58 years, 157 days	1924 Winter Olympics	Curling	Men's tournament
Youngest medalist	Nils Skoglund	14 years, 11 days	1920 Summer Olympics	Diving	Men's plain high diving
Youngest medalist	Kim Martin Hasson	15 years, 348 days	2002 Winter Olympics	Ice hockey	Women's tournament
Oldest participant	Oscar Swahn	72 years, 281 days	1920 Summer Olympics	Shooting	Men's 100 metre running deer, single shots
Oldest participant	Carl August Kronlund	58 years, 157 days	1924 Winter Olympics	Curling	Men's tournament
Youngest participant	Greta Carlsson	14 years, 2 days	1912 Summer Olympics	Swimming	Women's 100 metre freestyle
Youngest participant	Jennie-Lee Burmansson	15 years, 220 days	2018 Winter Olympics	Freestyle skiing	Women's slopestyle

== Hosted Games ==
Sweden has hosted the Games on one occasion. In 1956, the equestrian competitions were held in Stockholm.

Games	Host city	Dates	Nations	Participants	Events	Note
1912 Summer Olympics	Stockholm	6–22 July	28	2,406	102	
1956 Summer Olympics (equestrian)	Stockholm	11–17 June	29	159	6	Shared with Melbourne, Australia

=== Unsuccessful bids ===
Games	Proposed host city	Result	Games awarded to
1984 Winter Olympics	Gothenburg	Third place in IOC voting	Sarajevo, Yugoslavia
1988 Winter Olympics	Falun	Runner-up in IOC voting	Calgary, Canada
1992 Winter Olympics	Falun	Third place in IOC voting	Albertville, France
1994 Winter Olympics	Östersund	Runner-up in IOC voting	Lillehammer, Norway
1998 Winter Olympics	Östersund	Third place in IOC voting	Nagano, Japan
2002 Winter Olympics	Östersund (bid)	Runner-up in IOC voting	Salt Lake City, United States
2004 Summer Olympics	Stockholm	Fourth place in IOC voting	Athens, Greece
2022 Winter Olympics	Stockholm (bid)	Cancelled bid	Beijing, China
2026 Winter Olympics	Stockholm (bid)	Runner-up in IOC voting	Milan-Cortina d'Ampezzo, Italy

== Summary by Summer sport ==
=== Non-participations ===
Sweden has participated in most summer sports, but they have yet to participate in: Baseball/Softball, Cricket, Field hockey, Lacrosse, Rugby football (neither Rugby sevens or the discontinued discipline Rugby union), Sport climbing and Surfing.

Sweden never participated in the following discontinued sports: Basque pelota, Breaking, Croquet, Jeu de paume, Karate, Polo, Rackets, Roque and Water motorsports.

=== Aquatics ===
For aquatics disciplines, follow these links: Artistic swimming, Diving, Swimming and Water polo.

=== Archery ===
Archery was included in the Olympic programme between 1900 and 1920. Sweden first participated in 1972, the same year archery returned to the programme after a 52-year absence. Sweden participated in the sport every time from 1972 to 2020.

Sweden has won two silver medals in the sport. Gunnar Jervill won the silver medal in men's individual in 1972 and Magnus Petersson won the silver medal in men's individual in 1996.

The best placements in women's events were 5th by Jenny Sjövall in women's individual in 1988 and by her together with in Lise-Lotte Djerf and Kristina Persson-Nordlander in women's team in 1992.

The most participations in the sport by a Swedish archer is 4, shared between Göran Bjerendal (1980–1988, 1996) and Magnus Petersson (1996–2008).

Games	Archers	Events	Gold	Silver	Bronze	Total	Ranking
1972 Munich	5	2/2	0	1	0	1	=2
1976 Montreal	4	2/2	0	0	0	0	
1980 Moscow	3	2/2	0	0	0	0	
1984 Los Angeles	5	2/2	0	0	0	0	
1988 Seoul	6	4/4	0	0	0	0	
1992 Barcelona	3	2/4	0	0	0	0	
1996 Atlanta	6	4/4	0	1	0	1	=3
2000 Sydney	6	4/4	0	0	0	0	
2004 Athens	3	2/4	0	0	0	0	
2008 Beijing	1	1/4	0	0	0	0	
2012 London	1	1/4	0	0	0	0	
2016 Rio de Janeiro	1	1/4	0	0	0	0	
2020 Tokyo	1	1/5	0	0	0	0	
Total			0	2	0	2	=18

=== Artistic swimming ===
Artistic swimming has been included in the Olympic programme since 1984. Sweden has participated once, in 1988 Marie Jacobsson participated in women's solo and finished 9th. There are no men's events in the sport.

Games	Swimmers	Events	Gold	Silver	Bronze	Total	Ranking
1988 Seoul	1	1/2	0	0	0	0	
Total			0	0	0	0	–

=== Athletics ===
Sweden first competed in track and field athletics in 1896, sending 1 athlete (Henrik Sjöberg) who competed in four events. Sweden's first medal in the sport was a bronze in the 1900 marathon by Ernst Fast.

Sweden has earned 21 gold and 85 total medals in athletics, its second most successful summer sport after wrestling (28 gold and 86 total). Sweden has 12th most gold medals in the sport, while its total medal count would place it 8th.

Sweden has had two medal sweeps in the sport. Sweden swept men's triple jump at home soil in 1912. Sweden also swept men's 3000 metres steeplechase in 1948, which is Sweden's most recent medal sweep in any Olympic summer event.

The Swedish athlete with most titles in the sport was Eric Lemming who won 3 Olympic titles; freestyle javelin in 1908 and javelin throw in 1908 and 1912. He won another four medals in the 1906 Intercalated Games. Sweden has two double Olympic champions in the sport; John Mikaelsson won 10 km walk in 1948 and 1952 and Armand Duplantis won men's pole vault in 2020 and 2024.

Sweden has two female Olympic champions in the sport; Ludmila Engquist won 100m hurdles in 1996 and Carolina Klüft won heptathlon in 2004.

The Swedish athletes with most medals in the sport are Edvin Wide with five (one silver and four bronzes) won between 1920 and 1928 followed by Eric Backman with four (one silver and three bronzes), all won in 1920.

The Swedish athlete with most participations in the sport was John Ljunggren who participated in 5 Olympic Games between 1948 and 1964, winning one gold, one silver and one bronze medal.

Games	Athletes	Events	Gold	Silver	Bronze	Total	Ranking
1896 Athens	1	4/12	0	0	0	0	
1900 Paris	8	11/23	0	0	1	1	=11
1908 London	31	24/26	2	0	3	5	3
1912 Stockholm	106^{[1]}	28/30	3	6	6	15	3
1920 Antwerp	64	27/29	1	3	10	14	5
1924 Paris	33	20/27	0	3	2	5	6
1928 Amsterdam	29	21/27	1	2	4	7	6
1932 Los Angeles	9	8/29	0	1	0	1	=11
1936 Berlin	37	22/29	0	0	2	2	=12
1948 London	50	25/33	5	3	5	13	2
1952 Helsinki	45	24/33	1	0	2	3	9
1956 Melbourne	17	15/33	0	0	1	1	=18
1960 Rome	26	21/34	0	1	0	1	=13
1964 Tokyo	16	11/36	0	0	1	1	=20
1968 Mexico City	18	18/36	0	0	0	0	
1972 Munich	26	17/38	0	0	1	1	=20
1976 Montreal	19	14/37	1	0	0	1	=11
1980 Moscow	16	13/38	0	0	0	0	
1984 Los Angeles	24	19/41	0	2	1	3	16
1988 Seoul	11	8/42	0	0	1	1	=18
1992 Barcelona	19	15/43	0	1	0	1	=24
1996 Atlanta	17	16/44	1	0	0	1	=17
2000 Sydney	14	11/46	0	0	1	1	=40
2004 Athens	12	10/46	3	0	0	3	4
2008 Beijing	12	11/47	0	0	0	0	
2012 London	9	8/47	0	0	0	0	
2016 Rio de Janeiro	15	12/47	0	0	0	0	
2020 Tokyo	21	15/48	2	1	0	3	=10
2024 Paris	21	18/48	1	0	0	1	=22
Total			21	23	41	85	12

- ^{1} Tage Brauer was registered to participate too, but sources conflict as to whether he actually participated. He was not included in this count.

Swedish athletes also won 2 gold, 4 silver and 5 bronze medals in athletics at the 1906 Intercalated Games. IOC has retroactively decided to no longer recognize those games as official Olympic games.

=== Badminton ===
Badminton has been included in the Olympic programme since 1992. Sweden has participated in the sport in every time it has been included in the Olympic programme except for 2024.

Sweden has yet to win any medals in the sport. The best placements were 5th, first by Catrine Bengtsson and Maria Bengtsson in women's doubles in 1992, then equaled by Fredrik Bergström and Johanna Persson in mixed doubles in 2004.

Games	Players	Events	Gold	Silver	Bronze	Total	Ranking
1992 Barcelona	8	4/4	0	0	0	0	
1996 Atlanta	10	5/5	0	0	0	0	
2000 Sydney	6	3/5	0	0	0	0	
2004 Athens	3	2/5	0	0	0	0	
2008 Beijing	1	1/5	0	0	0	0	
2012 London	1	1/5	0	0	0	0	
2016 Rio de Janeiro	1	1/5	0	0	0	0	
2020 Tokyo	1	1/5	0	0	0	0	
Total			0	0	0	0	–

=== Basketball ===
==== 3x3 Basketball ====
3x3 basketball has been included in the Olympic programme since 2020, but Sweden has yet to participate in the discipline.

==== Team basketball ====
Basketball has been included in the Olympic programme since 1936. Sweden has participated once, in 1980. Sweden men's national basketball team participated in men's 5x5 and finished 10th.

Games	Players	Events	Gold	Silver	Bronze	Total	Ranking
1980 Moscow	12	1/2	0	0	0	0	
Total			0	0	0	0	–

=== Boxing ===
Boxing has been included in the Olympic programme since 1904 with the exception of the 1912 Games. Sweden first participated in 1924 and has participated most times since then.

They have won eleven medals so far; five silver and six bronze. The silver medals were won by Nils Ramm in men's heavyweight in 1928, Thure Ahlqvist in men's lightweight in 1932, Gunnar Nilsson in men's heavyweight in 1948, Ingemar Johansson in men's heavyweight in 1952 and George Scott in men's lightweight in 1988.

The best placement in a women's event was by Anna Laurell Nash who finished shared 5th in women's middleweight in 2012.

Games	Boxers	Events	Gold	Silver	Bronze	Total	Ranking
1924 Paris	5	4/8	0	0	0	0	
1928 Amsterdam	8	8/8	0	1	1	2	7
1932 Los Angeles	3	3/8	0	1	1	2	8
1936 Berlin	4	4/8	0	0	1	1	=11
1948 London	4	4/8	0	1	0	1	=7
1952 Helsinki	7	7/10	0	1	1	2	=9
1956 Melbourne	3	3/10	0	0	0	0	
1960 Rome	2	2/10	0	0	0	0	
1968 Mexico City	2	2/11	0	0	0	0	
1972 Munich	2	2/11	0	0	1	1	=17
1976 Montreal	3	3/11	0	0	0	0	
1980 Moscow	6	6/11	0	0	0	0	
1984 Los Angeles	6	6/12	0	0	0	0	
1988 Seoul	6	6/12	0	1	1	2	9
1992 Barcelona	3	3/12	0	0	0	0	
1996 Atlanta	6	6/12	0	0	0	0	
2004 Athens	1	1/11	0	0	0	0	
2008 Beijing	2	2/11	0	0	0	0	
2012 London	3	3/13	0	0	0	0	
2016 Rio de Janeiro	1	1/13	0	0	0	0	
2020 Tokyo	2	2/13	0	0	0	0	
2024 Paris	2	2/13	0	0	0	0	
Total			0	5	6	11	46

=== Canoeing ===
==== Slalom ====
Canoe slalom was first included in the Olympic programme in 1972. After that it didn't return until 1992, but it has remained in the programme since then.

Sweden has participated three times. Their best placement was by Erik Holmer who finished 9th in men's K1 in 2020. Sweden has so far not participated in women's events in the discipline.

Games	Canoeists	Events	Gold	Silver	Bronze	Total	Ranking
2016 Rio de Janeiro	1	1/4	0	0	0	0	
2020 Tokyo	1	1/4	0	0	0	0	
2024 Paris	1	2/6	0	0	0	0	
Total			0	0	0	0	–

==== Sprint ====
Canoe sprint (including the discontinued discipline canoe marathon) has been included in the Olympic programme since 1936. Sweden has participated in the discipline every time it has been included in the programme.

Sweden's most successful athlete in the discipline is Gert Fredriksson. He won 8 medals (6 gold, 1 silver, 1 bronze) and remains the most successful male canoeist of any country at the Olympic Games, and the most successful Swedish Olympian in any sport. His Olympic titles came in K1 1000m and K1 10 000m in 1948, K1 1000m in 1952, K1 1000m and K1 10 000m in 1956, and K2 1000m together with Sven-Olov Sjödelius in 1960.

The second most successful Swedish canoeist is Agneta Andersson who won 3 gold, 2 silver and 2 bronze medals. Her Olympic titles came in K1 500m in 1984, K2 500m with Anna Olsson in 1984, and K2 500m with Susanne Gunnarsson in 1996.

Sven-Olov Sjödelius is the remaining Swedish canoeist with two Olympic titles, aside from winning K2 1000m in 1960 with Gert Fredriksson (as listed above), he defended his title by winning K2 1000m in 1964 together with Gunnar Utterberg.

The most Olympic participations by a Swedish sprint canoeist is five, a record shared by three canoeists: Agneta Andersson (1980–1996), Anna Olsson (1984–2000) and Markus Oscarsson (1996–2012).

Games	Canoeists	Events	Gold	Silver	Bronze	Total	Ranking
1936 Berlin	9	6/9	1	0	1	2	5
1948 London	9	9/9	4	0	0	4	1
1952 Helsinki	10	9/9	1	3	0	4	2
1956 Melbourne	6	6/9	2	0	0	2	3
1960 Rome	6	5/7	1	0	1	2	=4
1964 Tokyo	7	6/7	2	0	0	2	3
1968 Mexico City	11	6/7	0	0	0	0	
1972 Munich	10	5/7	0	1	0	1	=6
1976 Montreal	11	9/11	0	0	0	0	
1980 Moscow	12	11/11	0	0	0	0	
1984 Los Angeles	11	10/12	2	4	0	6	2
1988 Seoul	11	8/12	0	0	0	0	
1992 Barcelona	13	10/12	0	2	1	3	10
1996 Atlanta	12	8/12	1	0	1	2	8
2000 Sydney	10	7/12	0	1	0	1	=15
2004 Athens	5	4/12	1	0	0	1	=8
2008 Beijing	3	4/12	0	0	0	0	
2012 London	6	5/12	0	0	0	0	
2016 Rio de Janeiro	4	4/12	0	0	0	0	
2020 Tokyo	2	3/12	0	0	0	0	
2024 Paris	4	3/10	0	0	0	0	
Total			15	11	4	30	4

=== Cycling ===
==== BMX freestyle ====
BMX freestyle has been included in the Olympic programme since 2020. Sweden has yet to participate in the discipline.

==== BMX racing ====
BMX racing has been included in the Olympic programme since 2008. Sweden has yet to participate in the discipline.

==== Mountain biking ====
Mountain biking has been included in the Olympic programme since 1996. Sweden has participated every time except for 2000.

Sweden has won two medals so far; Jenny Rissveds won gold in the women's event in 2016 and bronze in the same event in 2024. The best placement in a men's event was by Fredrik Kessiakoff who finished 12th in the men's event in 2004.

Games	Cyclists	Events	Gold	Silver	Bronze	Total	Ranking
1996 Atlanta	1	1/2	0	0	0	0	
2004 Athens	2	2/2	0	0	0	0	
2008 Beijing	2	1/2	0	0	0	0	
2012 London	1	1/2	0	0	0	0	
2016 Rio de Janeiro	1	1/2	1	0	0	1	=1
2020 Tokyo	1	1/2	0	0	0	0	
2024 Paris	1	1/2	0	0	1	1	=4
Total			1	0	1	2	=7

==== Road cycling ====
Road cycling was included in the Olympic programme in 1896. It returned in 1912 and has remained in the Olympic programme ever since. Sweden first participated in 1912 and has participated in the discipline in every Summer Olympic games since then except for 2020.

Sweden's most successful athlete in the discipline was Ragnar Malm with 1 gold, 1 silver and 1 bronze medal. He won his gold medal together with Erik Friborg, Algot Lönn and Axel Persson in men's team time trial in 1912.

Sweden's two remaining gold medals were won by Harry Stenqvist in men's individual time trial in 1920 and Bernt Johansson in men's individual road race in 1976.

The most successful female Swedish cyclist in the discipline was Emma Johansson who won two silver medals in women's individual road race, first in 2008 and then again in 2016.

The Swedish athlete with most participations in the sport was Michel Lafis who participated in 4 Olympic Games between 1988 and 2000.

Games	Cyclists	Events	Gold	Silver	Bronze	Total	Ranking
1912 Stockholm	12	2/2	1	0	0	1	=1
1920 Antwerp	4	2/2	1	1	0	2	1
1924 Paris	4	2/2	0	0	1	1	3
1928 Amsterdam	4	2/2	0	0	2	2	3
1932 Los Angeles	4	2/2	0	0	2	2	3
1936 Berlin	4	2/2	0	0	0	0	
1948 London	4	2/2	0	0	0	0	
1952 Helsinki	4	2/2	0	0	0	0	
1956 Melbourne	4	2/2	0	0	0	0	
1960 Rome	4	2/2	0	0	0	0	
1964 Tokyo	4	2/2	0	0	1	1	=4
1968 Mexico City	5	2/2	0	1	1	2	3
1972 Munich	5	2/2	0	0	0	0	
1976 Montreal	6	2/2	1	0	0	1	=1
1980 Moscow	6	2/2	0	0	0	0	
1984 Los Angeles	11	3/3	0	0	0	0	
1988 Seoul	8	3/3	0	0	1	1	=5
1992 Barcelona	9	3/3	0	0	0	0	
1996 Atlanta	6	3/4	0	0	0	0	
2000 Sydney	5	2/4	0	0	0	0	
2004 Athens	7	4/4	0	0	0	0	
2008 Beijing	6	4/4	0	2	0	2	5
2012 London	4	4/4	0	0	0	0	
2016 Rio de Janeiro	3	1/4	0	1	0	1	=5
2024 Paris	2	2/4	0	0	0	0	
Total			3	5	8	16	7

Sweden also participated in road cycling at the 1906 Intercalated Games without winning any medals in the discipline. IOC has retroactively decided to no longer recognize those games as official Olympic games.

==== Track cycling ====
Track cycling has been included in the Olympic programme since the inaugural 1896 Summer Olympics, with the exception of the 1912 Games held in Sweden.

The best placement was by Andrew Hansson who was one of 9 cyclists to reach the final but who failed to finish top 4 in men's 20 km in 1908.

Sweden has yet to participate in women's events in the discipline.

Games	Cyclists	Events	Gold	Silver	Bronze	Total	Ranking
1908 London	2	5/7	0	0	0	0	
1936 Berlin	1	1/4	0	0	0	0	
1952 Helsinki	4	1/4	0	0	0	0	
1968 Mexico City	5	3/5	0	0	0	0	
Total			0	0	0	0	–

Sweden also participated in track cycling at the 1906 Intercalated Games without winning any medals in the discipline. IOC has retroactively decided to no longer recognize those games as official Olympic games.

=== Diving ===
Diving has been included in the Olympic programme since 1904. Sweden participated in the sport in every Olympic Games since 1908 except for 2016.

Sweden has had three medal sweeps in the sport; men's 10 metre platform in 1908 and men's plain high diving in 1912 and 1920.

Sweden's most successful athlete in the sport is Erik Adlerz who won gold in both men's 10 metre platform and men's plain high diving in 1912, and won silver in men's 10 metre platform in 1920. The second most successful athlete is Ulrika Knape who won gold in women's 10 metre platform and silver in women's 3 metre springboard in 1972 and silver in women's 10 metre platform in 1976.

The remaining Swedish Olympic champions in the sport are Hjalmar Johansson who won gold in men's 10 metre platform in 1908, Greta Johansson who won gold in women's 10 metre platform in 1912 and Arvid Wallman who won gold in men's plain high diving in 1920. The Swedish athlete with most participations in the sport was Anna Lindberg who participated in 5 Olympic Games between 1996 and 2012.

Games	Divers	Events	Gold	Silver	Bronze	Total	Ranking
1908 London	10	2/2	1	1	1	3	=1
1912 Stockholm	34	4/4	3	2	2	7	1
1920 Antwerp	12	4/5	1	2	2	5	2
1924 Paris	11	5/5	0	1	1	2	3
1928 Amsterdam	8	3/4	0	0	1	1	3
1932 Los Angeles	1	1/4	0	0	0	0	
1936 Berlin	3	2/4	0	0	0	0	
1948 London	3	3/4	0	0	0	0	
1952 Helsinki	4	3/4	0	0	0	0	
1956 Melbourne	2	2/4	0	0	0	0	
1960 Rome	4	3/4	0	0	0	0	
1964 Tokyo	2	2/4	0	0	0	0	
1968 Mexico City	1	2/4	0	0	0	0	
1972 Munich	2	2/4	1	1	0	2	3
1976 Montreal	3	2/4	0	1	0	1	=4
1980 Moscow	2	2/4	0	0	0	0	
1984 Los Angeles	2	2/4	0	0	0	0	
1988 Seoul	2	2/4	0	0	0	0	
1992 Barcelona	1	1/4	0	0	0	0	
1996 Atlanta	3	3/4	0	0	0	0	
2000 Sydney	1	1/8	0	0	0	0	
2004 Athens	1	1/8	0	0	0	0	
2008 Beijing	2	2/8	0	0	0	0	
2012 London	2	2/8	0	0	0	0	
2020 Tokyo	1	1/8	0	0	0	0	
2024 Paris	1	1/8	0	0	0	0	
Total			6	8	7	21	3

Sweden also participated in diving at the 1906 Intercalated Games without winning any medals in the discipline. IOC has retroactively decided to no longer recognize those games as official Olympic games.

=== Equestrian ===
Henri Saint Cyr is the most successful Swedish athlete in equestrian, he won four gold medals in dressage, two each in 1952 and 1956.

Two Swedish riders have won gold medals in two different disciplines, both Georg von Braun and Åge Lundström won gold in team eventing in 1920 (together with Helmer Mörner) as well as gold in team jumping in 1924 (together with Axel Ståhle and Åke Thelning).

The Swedish athlete with most participations in the sport was Tinne Vilhelmson-Silfvén who participated in 7 Olympic Games between 1992 and 2016, all in dressage.

==== Dressage ====
Dressage had one event included in 1900. It returned to the Olympic programme in 1912 and has remained in the Olympic programme ever since. Sweden participated in the discipline at the 1912 Games and has participated most times since then.

Sweden has had two medal sweeps in the discipline, individual dressage in 1912 and 1920.

Sweden's most successful athlete in the discipline is Henri Saint Cyr who won four gold medals. He won individual dressage in 1952 and 1956 as well as team dressage together with Gustaf Adolf Boltenstern Jr. and Gehnäll Persson both in 1952 and 1956.

Sweden's remaining three gold medals were all won in the individual event. Carl Bonde won in 1912, Janne Lundblad won in 1920 and Ernst Linder won in 1924.

The most successful female Swedish athlete in the discipline was Ulla Håkansson who won bronze in the team event in 1972 and 1984.

The Swedish athlete with most participations in the discipline is Tinne Vilhelmson-Silfvén who participated in 7 Olympic Games between 1992 and 2016.

Games	Riders	Events	Gold	Silver	Bronze	Total	Ranking
1912 Stockholm	6	1/1	1	1	1	3	1
1920 Antwerp	5	1/1	1	1	1	3	1
1924 Paris	4	1/1	1	1	0	2	1
1928 Amsterdam	3	2/2	0	1	1	2	2
1932 Los Angeles	3	2/2	0	1	0	1	2
1936 Berlin	3	2/2	0	0	1	1	=3
1948 London	3	2/2	0	0	1	1	=4
1952 Helsinki	3	2/2	2	0	0	2	1
1956 Melbourne / Stockholm	3	2/2	2	0	0	2	1
1960 Rome	2	1/1	0	0	0	0	
1964 Tokyo	3	2/2	0	0	0	0	
1972 Munich	3	2/2	0	0	1	1	3
1984 Los Angeles	3	2/2	0	0	1	1	4
1988 Seoul	4	2/2	0	0	0	0	
1992 Barcelona	4	2/2	0	0	0	0	
1996 Atlanta	4	2/2	0	0	0	0	
2000 Sydney	3	2/2	0	0	0	0	
2004 Athens	4	2/2	0	0	0	0	
2008 Beijing / Hongkong	3	2/2	0	0	0	0	
2012 London	3	2/2	0	0	0	0	
2016 Rio de Janeiro	4	2/2	0	0	0	0	
2020 Tokyo	3	2/2	0	0	0	0	
2024 Paris	3	2/2	0	0	0	0	
Total			7	5	7	19	2

==== Eventing ====
Eventing has been included in the Olympic programme since 1912. Sweden has first competed in 1912 and has participated most times since then.

Sweden have won seven gold medals in eventing. Four Swedish men have won two Olympic gold medals; Axel Nordlander won the individual event in 1912 and together with Nils Adlercreutz and Ernst Casparsson he won the team event in 1912 as well. Helmer Mörner won the individual event in 1920 and together with Georg von Braun and Åge Lundström he won the team event in 1920 too. Hans von Blixen-Finecke Jr. won the individual event in 1952 and together with Folke Frölén and Olof Stahre he won the team event in 1952 too.

Petrus Kastenman is the final Swedish Olympic champion in the discipline, he won gold in the individual event in 1956.

The most successful Swedish female eventing rider is Sara Algotsson Ostholt who won silver in the individual event in 2012.

The Swedish rider with most participation in the event is Linda Algotsson who participated 5 times (1996, 2004–2016).

Games	Riders	Events	Gold	Silver	Bronze	Total	Ranking
1912 Stockholm	4	2/2	2	0	0	2	1
1920 Antwerp	4	2/2	2	1	0	3	1
1924 Paris	4	2/2	0	1	0	1	=2
1928 Amsterdam	3	2/2	0	0	0	0	
1932 Los Angeles	3	2/2	0	0	1	1	3
1936 Berlin	3	2/2	0	0	0	0	
1948 London	3	2/2	0	1	1	2	3
1952 Helsinki	3	2/2	2	0	0	2	1
1956 Melbourne / Stockholm	3	2/2	1	0	0	1	2
1960 Rome	4	2/2	0	0	0	0	
1972 Munich	1	1/2	0	0	1	1	=4
1984 Los Angeles	4	2/2	0	0	0	0	
1992 Barcelona	4	2/2	0	0	0	0	
1996 Atlanta	5	2/2	0	0	0	0	
2000 Sydney	2	1/2	0	0	0	0	
2004 Athens	3	2/2	0	0	0	0	
2008 Beijing / Hongkong	5	2/2	0	0	0	0	
2012 London	5	2/2	0	1	0	1	=2
2016 Rio de Janeiro	4	2/2	0	0	0	0	
2020 Tokyo	4	2/2	0	0	0	0	
2024 Paris	3	2/2	0	0	0	0	
Total			7	4	3	14	3

==== Show jumping ====
Show Jumping was included in the Olympic programme in 1900. It returned in 1912 and has remained in the Olympic programme ever since. Sweden has first competed in 1912 and has participated most times since then.

Sweden have won four gold medals in show jumping, all in the team jumping event. Gustaf Kilman, Gustaf Lewenhaupt, Hans von Rosen and Fredrik Rosencrantz won in 1912, Claës König, Frank Martin, Daniel Norling and Hans von Rosen won in 1920, Åge Lundström, Axel Ståhle and Åke Thelning won in 1924 and Malin Baryard-Johnsson, Henrik von Eckermann and Peder Fredricson won in 2020.

Sweden's most successful athletes in the discipline are Hans von Rosen who won 2 gold medals (in the team events in 1912 and 1920 as mentioned above) and Peder Fredricson who won 1 gold (in the team event in 2020) and 3 silver medals, in the team event in 2004, and in the individual events in 2016 and 2020.

The most participations in the discipline by a Swedish athlete is 5, by Malin Baryard-Johnsson (1996–2004, 2016–2020), Rolf-Göran Bengtsson (1996, 2004–2016, was also reserve in 2020) and Peter Eriksson (1984, 1992–1996, 2004–2008).

Games	Riders	Events	Gold	Silver	Bronze	Total	Ranking
1912 Stockholm	9	2/2	1	0	0	1	2
1920 Antwerp	10	2/2	1	0	1	2	2
1924 Paris	4	2/2	1	0	0	1	2
1928 Amsterdam	3	2/2	0	0	1	1	=5
1932 Los Angeles	3	2/2	0	0	1	1	3
1936 Berlin	3	2/2	0	0	0	0	
1948 London	3	2/2	0	0	0	0	
1952 Helsinki	3	2/2	0	0	0	0	
1956 Melbourne / Stockholm	3	2/2	0	0	0	0	
1960 Rome	4	2/2	0	0	0	0	
1972 Munich	2	1/2	0	0	0	0	
1976 Montreal	1	1/2	0	0	0	0	
1984 Los Angeles	1	1/2	0	0	0	0	
1992 Barcelona	4	2/2	0	0	0	0	
1996 Atlanta	4	2/2	0	0	0	0	
2000 Sydney	4	2/2	0	0	0	0	
2004 Athens	4	2/2	0	1	0	1	3
2008 Beijing / Hongkong	4	2/2	0	1	0	1	3
2012 London	4	2/2	0	0	0	0	
2016 Rio de Janeiro	4	2/2	0	1	0	1	=3
2020 Tokyo	4	2/2	1	1	0	2	1
2024 Paris	3	2/2	0	0	0	0	
Total			4	4	3	11	5

==== Discontinued disciplines ====
Equestrian driving was conducted during the 1900 Summer Olympics and equestrian vaulting during the 1920 Summer Olympics. Sweden didn't participate in the discipline in 1900, but did participate in both events in 1920, winning bronze in team vaulting.

Games	Riders	Events	Gold	Silver	Bronze	Total	Ranking
1920 Antwerp	5	2/2	0	0	1	1	3
Total			0	0	1	1	3

=== Fencing ===
Fencing has been included in the Olympic programme since the inaugural 1896 Games. Sweden first participated in 1900 and has participated most times since then.

Sweden has won 7 medals in the sport; 2 gold, 3 silver and 2 bronze. The first gold was won by Rolf Edling, Carl von Essen, Göran Flodström, Leif Högström and Hans Jacobson in men's team épée in 1976. The second was won by Johan Harmenberg in men's épée in 1980.

The best placement in a women's event was 5th, by Kerstin Palm in women's foil in 1968. Kerstin Palm is also the Swedish athlete with most participations in the sport. She became the first woman from any country to participate in 7 Olympic Games by participating in all Summer Games between 1964 and 1988.

Games	Fencers	Events	Gold	Silver	Bronze	Total	Ranking
1900 Paris	1	1/7	0	0	0	0	
1908 London	7	2/4	0	0	0	0	
1912 Stockholm	18	5/5	0	0	0	0	
1920 Antwerp	8	3/6	0	0	0	0	
1924 Paris	9	3/7	0	0	1	1	=7
1928 Amsterdam	8	4/7	0	0	0	0	
1932 Los Angeles	3	1/7	0	0	0	0	
1936 Berlin	13	6/7	0	1	0	1	5
1948 London	8	4/7	0	0	1	1	=6
1952 Helsinki	10	5/7	0	1	0	1	4
1956 Melbourne	5	2/7	0	0	0	0	
1960 Rome	7	4/8	0	0	0	0	
1964 Tokyo	7	3/8	0	0	0	0	
1968 Mexico City	6	3/8	0	0	0	0	
1972 Munich	6	4/8	0	0	0	0	
1976 Montreal	7	4/8	1	0	0	1	5
1980 Moscow	6	3/8	1	0	0	1	3
1984 Los Angeles	6	3/8	0	1	0	1	6
1988 Seoul	11	5/8	0	0	0	0	
1992 Barcelona	6	3/8	0	0	0	0	
1996 Atlanta	2	2/10	0	0	0	0	
2000 Sydney	1	1/10	0	0	0	0	
2008 Beijing	1	1/10	0	0	0	0	
Total			2	3	2	7	19

Sweden also participated in fencing at the 1906 Intercalated Games without winning any medals in the sport. IOC has retroactively decided to no longer recognize those games as official Olympic games.

=== Football ===
Football has been included in the Olympic programme since 1900 with the exception of the 1932 Games. Sweden first participated in 1908. The women's event was added in 1996, and Sweden has participated in every edition of that event except for 2024.

Sweden has won five medals so far. Sweden's men's team won gold in 1948 and bronze in 1924 and 1952.

Sweden's women's team won silver in 2016 and 2020.

Sweden's most successful male Olympic footballer was Erik Nilsson who won gold in 1948 and bronze in 1952. Sweden's most successful female Olympic footballers are 9 players who won silver in both 2016 and 2020.

The most participations in the sport by a Swedish footballer is 4, shared between Hedvig Lindahl (2008–2020), Lotta Schelin (2004–2016) and Caroline Seger (2008–2020). Hedvig Lindahl was also part of the squad in 2004, but did not play in any games.

Games	Footballers	Events	Gold	Silver	Bronze	Total	Ranking
1908 London	14	1/1	0	0	0	0	
1912 Stockholm	14	1/1	0	0	0	0	
1920 Antwerp	12	1/1	0	0	0	0	
1924 Paris	18	1/1	0	0	1	1	3
1936 Berlin	11	1/1	0	0	0	0	
1948 London	12	1/1	1	0	0	1	1
1952 Helsinki	12	1/1	0	0	1	1	3
1988 Seoul	20	1/1	0	0	0	0	
1992 Barcelona	20	1/1	0	0	0	0	
1996 Atlanta	16	1/2	0	0	0	0	
2000 Sydney	18	1/2	0	0	0	0	
2004 Athens	18	1/2	0	0	0	0	
2008 Beijing	18	1/2	0	0	0	0	
2012 London	18	1/2	0	0	0	0	
2016 Rio de Janeiro	37^{[2]}	2/2	0	1	0	1	3
2020 Tokyo	22	1/2	0	1	0	1	=3
Total			1	2	2	5	11

- ^{2} Squad sizes were 18 each for men and women. However, squad member Pauline Hammarlund was replaced during the tournament by alternate Fridolina Rolfö due to injury.

=== Golf ===
Golf was originally included in the Olympic programme in 1900 and 1904 but without Swedish participation. Golf returned to the games in 2016, and Sweden has participated in it since.

Henrik Stenson won a silver in men's individual in 2016, which is Sweden's only medal in the sport so far.

Sweden's best placement in a women's event was by Anna Nordqvist who finished shared 11th in women's individual in 2016.

Games	Golfers	Events	Gold	Silver	Bronze	Total	Ranking
2016 Rio de Janeiro	4	2/2	0	1	0	1	=3
2020 Tokyo	4	2/2	0	0	0	0	
2024 Paris	4	2/2	0	0	0	0	
Total			0	1	0	1	=7

=== Gymnastics ===
==== Artistic gymnastics ====
Artistic gymnastics has been included in the Summer Olympic programme since the inaugural 1896 Games. Sweden participated in the discipline at the 1896 Games and has participated frequently since then.

Sweden has won five gold medals in the sport, four of those in team events: men's team in 1908, men's team Swedish system in 1912 and 1920 and women's team portable apparatus in 1952.

Sweden's sole gold medalist in an individual event is William Thoresson who won men's floor in 1952. He also won a silver medal in the same event in 1956 and is the Swedish athlete with most participations in Artistic Gymnastics in the Olympic games as he participated in four Games between 1952 and 1964.

Sweden's most successful athletes in the discipline are seven men who won two gold in team events; Holmberg, Landberg, brothers Norling and Norling, Rosén and Svensson won in 1908 and 1912, and John Sörenson won in 1912 and 1920.

Sweden's most successful female athlete is Ann-Sofi Pettersson-Colling who in women's team portable apparatus won gold in 1952 and silver in 1956, and she also won a bronze in vault in 1956.

Games	Gymnasts	Events	Gold	Silver	Bronze	Total	Ranking
1896 Athens	1	1/8	0	0	0	0	
1908 London	38	1/2	1	0	0	1	=1
1912 Stockholm	24	1/4	1	0	0	1	3
1920 Antwerp	24	1/4	1	0	0	1	3
1948 London	8	1/9	0	0	0	0	
1952 Helsinki	15	15/15	2	0	0	2	4
1956 Melbourne	8	14/15	0	2	1	3	5
1960 Rome	12	14/14	0	0	0	0	
1964 Tokyo	9	13/14	0	0	0	0	
1968 Mexico City	6	12/14	0	0	0	0	
1972 Munich	1	5/14	0	0	0	0	
1980 Moscow	1	5/14	0	0	0	0	
1984 Los Angeles	2	12/14	0	0	0	0	
1988 Seoul	1	7/14	0	0	0	0	
1992 Barcelona	1	7/14	0	0	0	0	
2004 Athens	1	5/14	0	0	0	0	
2012 London	1	4/14	0	0	0	0	
2016 Rio de Janeiro	1	4/14	0	0	0	0	
2020 Tokyo	2	8/14	0	0	0	0	
Total			5	2	1	8	18

==== Rhythmic gymnastics ====
Rhythmic gymnastics has been included in the Olympic programme since 1984. Sweden has participated once, in 1984. Viktoria Bengtsson finished 19th in women's individual all-around.

There are no men's events in the discipline.

Games	Gymnasts	Events	Gold	Silver	Bronze	Total	Ranking
1984 Los Angeles	1	1/1	0	0	0	0	
Total			0	0	0	0	–

==== Trampoline ====
Trampoline has been included in the Olympic programme since 2000. Sweden has yet to participate in the discipline.

=== Handball ===
Handball was included in the Olympic programme in 1936. It returned in 1972 and has remained in the Olympic programme ever since. Sweden first participated in 1972 and has participated in the sport in most Summer Olympic games since then. Sweden has won four medals, all silver, in the sport. Sweden men's national handball team managed to win those in the men's events in 1992, 1996, 2000 and 2012. The best placements in the women's event was 4th which Sweden women's national handball team achieved in 2020 and 2024.

Ola Lindgren, Staffan Olsson and Magnus Wislander share the Swedish record for most medals in the sport, with three silver medals each.

The most participations in the sport by a Swedish handballer is 4, shared between Per Carlén (1984–1996), Ola Lindgren (1988–2000), Mats Olsson (1984–1996), Staffan Olsson (1988–2000) and Magnus Wislander (1988–2000).

Games	Handballers	Events	Gold	Silver	Bronze	Total	Ranking
1972 Munich	16	1/1	0	0	0	0	
1984 Los Angeles	15	1/2	0	0	0	0	
1988 Seoul	15	1/2	0	0	0	0	
1992 Barcelona	16	1/2	0	1	0	1	=3
1996 Atlanta	16	1/2	0	1	0	1	=3
2000 Sydney	15	1/2	0	1	0	1	=3
2008 Beijing	15	1/2	0	0	0	0	
2012 London	30	2/2	0	1	0	1	=3
2016 Rio de Janeiro	30	2/2	0	0	0	0	
2020 Tokyo	30	2/2	0	0	0	0	
2024 Paris	31	2/2	0	0	0	0	
Total			0	4	0	4	10

=== Judo ===
Judo has been included in the Olympic programme since 1964 with the exception of the 1968 Games. Sweden first participated in 1972 and has participated every time since then except for 2008.

Sweden has won one medal in the sport; Tara Babulfath won bronze in women's extra-lightweight in 2024.

Sweden's best placements in men's events were 5th, by Bertil Ström in men's middleweight in 1980, Lars Adolfsson in men's half-middleweight in 1992 and Marcus Nyman in men's middleweight in 2016.

Games	Judoka	Events	Gold	Silver	Bronze	Total	Ranking
1972 Munich	1	1/6	0	0	0	0	
1976 Montreal	1	2/6	0	0	0	0	
1980 Moscow	4	4/8	0	0	0	0	
1984 Los Angeles	4	4/8	0	0	0	0	
1988 Seoul	2	2/7	0	0	0	0	
1992 Barcelona	6	6/14	0	0	0	0	
1996 Atlanta	1	1/14	0	0	0	0	
2000 Sydney	2	2/14	0	0	0	0	
2004 Athens	1	1/14	0	0	0	0	
2012 London	1	1/14	0	0	0	0	
2016 Rio de Janeiro	4	4/14	0	0	0	0	
2020 Tokyo	4	4/15	0	0	0	0	
2024 Paris	2	2/15	0	0	1	1	=20
Total			0	0	1	1	=56

=== Modern pentathlon ===
Modern pentathlon has been included in the Olympic programme since 1912. Sweden participated in the sport in every Olympic Games from then until 2004. They participated in every event held in the sport from the start in 1912 until 2000.

Participation in the sport started remarkably well for Sweden with their three medal sweeps in the sport occurring in the first three events held: in 1912, 1920 and 1924. Sweden's most successful athlete in the sport is Lars Hall who won gold in men's individual in 1952 and 1956 and silver in men's team in 1952. The second most successful athlete is Bo Lindman who won gold in men's individual in 1924 and silver in men's individual in 1928 and 1932. The remaining Swedish Olympic champions in the sport are Gösta Lilliehöök who won in 1912, Gustaf Dyrssen in 1920, Sven Thofelt in 1928, Johan Oxenstierna in 1932, William Grut in 1948 and Björn Ferm in 1968, all in men's individual.

The sole Swedish woman to participate in modern pentathlon was Jeanette Malm who finished 17th in the women's event in 2000, the first Games where women were allowed to participate in the sport.

Games	Pentathletes	Events	Gold	Silver	Bronze	Total	Ranking
1912 Stockholm	12	1/1	1	1	1	3	1
1920 Antwerp	4	1/1	1	1	1	3	1
1924 Paris	4	1/1	1	1	1	3	1
1928 Amsterdam	3	1/1	1	1	0	2	1
1932 Los Angeles	3	1/1	1	1	0	2	1
1936 Berlin	3	1/1	0	0	0	0	
1948 London	3	1/1	1	0	1	2	1
1952 Helsinki	3	2/2	1	1	0	2	2
1956 Melbourne	3	2/2	1	0	0	1	=1
1960 Rome	3	2/2	0	0	0	0	
1964 Tokyo	3	2/2	0	0	0	0	
1968 Mexico City	3	2/2	1	0	0	1	2
1972 Munich	3	2/2	0	0	0	0	
1976 Montreal	3	2/2	0	0	0	0	
1980 Moscow	3	2/2	0	0	1	1	3
1984 Los Angeles	3	2/2	0	1	0	1	=2
1988 Seoul	3	2/2	0	0	0	0	
1992 Barcelona	3	2/2	0	0	0	0	
1996 Atlanta	1	1/1	0	0	0	0	
2000 Sydney	2	2/2	0	0	0	0	
2004 Athens	1	1/2	0	0	0	0	
2024 Paris	1	1/2	0	0	0	0	
Total			9	7	5	21	2

=== Rowing ===
Rowing has been included in the Olympic programme since 1900. Sweden first participated in 1912 and has participated in the sport in most summer games since then.

Sweden has won two medals in the sport; Bruhn-Möller, Brunkman, Dahlbäck, Rosvall and Wilkens won silver in men's coxed four, inriggers in 1912 and Aronsson, Eriksson, Gunnarsson, Göransson and Larsson won silver in men's coxed four in 1956.

The best placement in a women's event was 4th, by both Marie Carlsson and Carina Gustavsson in women's double sculls in 1984 and by Maria Brandin in women's single sculls in 1996. Maria Brandin is also the Swedish athlete that has most participations in the sport, she participated in 4 Olympic Games between 1988 and 2000.

Games	Rowers	Events	Gold	Silver	Bronze	Total	Ranking
1912 Stockholm	28	3/4	0	1	0	1	=4
1920 Antwerp	6	2/5	0	0	0	0	
1936 Berlin	5	1/7	0	0	0	0	
1948 London	3	2/7	0	0	0	0	
1952 Helsinki	16	4/7	0	0	0	0	
1956 Melbourne	9	2/7	0	1	0	1	=6
1960 Rome	12	4/7	0	0	0	0	
1972 Munich	1	1/7	0	0	0	0	
1976 Montreal	3	2/14	0	0	0	0	
1980 Moscow	7	3/14	0	0	0	0	
1984 Los Angeles	8	4/14	0	0	0	0	
1988 Seoul	8	4/14	0	0	0	0	
1992 Barcelona	7	3/14	0	0	0	0	
1996 Atlanta	9	4/14	0	0	0	0	
2000 Sydney	3	2/14	0	0	0	0	
2004 Athens	1	1/14	0	0	0	0	
2008 Beijing	2	2/14	0	0	0	0	
2012 London	2	2/14	0	0	0	0	
2016 Rio de Janeiro	1	1/14	0	0	0	0	
2020 Tokyo	1	1/14	0	0	0	0	
Total			0	2	0	2	=38

=== Sailing ===
Sailing has been included in the Olympic programme since 1900 with the exception of the 1904 Games. Sweden first participated in 1908 and has participated every time since then.

Sweden's most successful athlete in the sport is Tore Holm who won 2 gold and 2 bronze medals. Together with Yngve Holm, Axel Rydin and Georg Tengwall he won gold in 40 m^{2} skerry cruiser in 1920 and together with Martin Hindorff, Åke Bergqvist and Olle Åkerlund he won gold in the 6 metre in 1932.

Sweden's remaining gold medals were won by the following athletes: Ericsson, Hellström, Isberg, Lundén, Nyberg, Rosenswärd, Wallerius and Wallin in 10 metre in 1912; Gösta Bengtsson, Gösta Lundquist and Rolf Steffenburg in 30 m^{2} skerry cruiser in 1920; Sven Thorell in 12 foot dinghy in 1928; Folke Bohlin, Bengt Palmquist and Leif Wikström in dragon in 1956; Hjalmar Karlsson, Sture Stork, Lars Thörn in 5.5 metre in 1956; Jörgen Sundelin, Peter Sundelin and Ulf Sundelin in 5.5 metre in 1968; John Albrechtson and Ingvar Hansson in tempest in 1976 and Fredrik Lööf and Max Salminen in star in 2012.

Sweden's most successful female sailors are Birgitta Bengtsson and Marit Söderström who won silver in women's 470 in 1988, Josefin Olsson who won silver in laser radial in 2020 and Vilma Bobeck and Rebecca Netzler who won silver in 49erFX in 2024.

The Swedish athlete with most participations in the sport was Fredrik Lööf who participated in 6 Olympic Games between 1992 and 2012.

Games	Sailors	Events	Gold	Silver	Bronze	Total	Ranking
1908 London	13	2/4	0	1	0	1	=2
1912 Stockholm	41	4/4	1	2	1	4	2
1920 Antwerp	11	2/14	2	1	0	3	=2
1924 Paris	4	2/3	0	0	0	0	
1928 Amsterdam	11	3/3	1	0	1	2	2
1932 Los Angeles	7	3/4	1	0	1	2	2
1936 Berlin	15	4/4	0	1	1	2	6
1948 London	13	5/5	0	1	1	2	5
1952 Helsinki	14	5/5	0	1	2	3	5
1956 Melbourne	7	3/5	2	0	0	2	1
1960 Rome	11	5/5	0	0	0	0	
1964 Tokyo	11	5/5	0	1	1	2	7
1968 Mexico City	13	5/5	1	0	0	1	=3
1972 Munich	14	6/6	0	2	0	2	6
1976 Montreal	13	6/6	1	0	0	1	=4
1980 Moscow	10	5/6	0	0	1	1	=9
1984 Los Angeles	13	7/7	0	0	0	0	
1988 Seoul	15	8/8	0	1	0	1	=9
1992 Barcelona	15	9/10	0	0	0	0	
1996 Atlanta	15	9/10	0	1	0	1	=12
2000 Sydney	17	10/11	0	0	1	1	=13
2004 Athens	10	6/11	0	0	1	1	=15
2008 Beijing	11	7/11	0	0	1	1	=14
2012 London	14	8/10	1	0	1	2	6
2016 Rio de Janeiro	7	5/10	0	0	0	0	
2020 Tokyo	9	6/10	0	2	0	2	9
2024 Paris	8	5/10	0	1	1	2	=8
Total			10	15	14	39	8

=== Shooting ===
Shooting was included in the inaugural 1896 Summer Olympic programme and has been included in all Summer Games since then except for 1904 and 1928. Sweden first participated in 1908 and has participated in the sport every time it has been included in the programme since then.

Sweden has had two medal sweeps in the sport. During the 1912 Summer Olympics Sweden swept men's 25m small-bore rifle and men's 100 meter running deer, double shots. In the latter event Sweden took all the nine first places, which is the record for Sweden in any Olympic event.

Sweden has three triple Olympic champions in the sport, Vilhelm Carlberg, Alfred Swahn and Oscar Swahn.

Oscar Swahn and his son Alfred Swahn won men's team single-shot running dear in 1908 and men's 100m team running deer in 1912 together. Oscar Swahn also won men's single-shot running dear in 1908 while Alfred Swahn won men's 100m running deer, single shots.

Oscar Swahn is the oldest Olympic champion, oldest Olympic medalist and oldest Olympic athlete in any sport.

Vilhelm Carlberg got all his three titles in 1912 by winning men's 30m team rapid fire pistol, men's 25m small-bore rifle and men's 25m team small-bore rifle.

Pia Hansen is the only Swedish woman to become Olympic champion in shooting, she won women's double trap in 2000.

The Swedish athlete with most participations in the sport is Ragnar Skanåker who participated in 7 Olympic Games between 1972 and 1996, winning four medals including the gold in mixed 50m pistol in 1972.

Games	Shooters	Events	Gold	Silver	Bronze	Total	Ranking
1908 London	19	14/15	2	2	1	5	3
1912 Stockholm	63	18/18	7	6	4	17	1
1920 Antwerp	29	17/21	1	6	3	10	3
1924 Paris	19	10/10	0	2	2	4	6
1932 Los Angeles	3	1/2	1	0	0	1	2
1936 Berlin	7	3/3	1	0	1	2	2
1948 London	11	4/4	0	0	3	3	7
1952 Helsinki	10	7/7	0	2	1	3	7
1956 Melbourne	8	6/7	0	1	1	2	6
1960 Rome	9	6/6	0	0	0	0	
1964 Tokyo	6	6/6	0	0	0	0	
1968 Mexico City	9	7/7	0	0	0	0	
1972 Munich	10	8/8	1	0	0	1	=4
1976 Montreal	11	7/7	0	0	0	0	
1980 Moscow	8	6/7	0	1	1	2	7
1984 Los Angeles	14	11/11	0	1	0	1	=8
1988 Seoul	15	12/13	0	1	0	1	=11
1992 Barcelona	7	8/13	0	0	1	1	=15
1996 Atlanta	3	4/15	0	0	0	0	
2000 Sydney	6	10/17	2	0	0	2	=2
2004 Athens	8	7/17	0	0	0	0	
2008 Beijing	2	2/15	0	0	0	0	
2012 London	4	3/15	0	1	0	1	=14
2016 Rio de Janeiro	3	2/15	0	1	0	1	=13
2020 Tokyo	1	1/15	0	0	0	0	
2024 Paris	7	7/15	0	1	0	1	=10
Total			15	25	18	58	5

Swedish athletes also won one silver and one bronze medal in shooting at the 1906 Intercalated Games. IOC has retroactively decided to no longer recognize those games as official Olympic games.

=== Skateboarding ===
Skateboarding was first introduced at the 2020 Summer Olympics. Sweden has participated in the sport every time it has been included in the programme.

The most successful Swedish participant so far is Hampus Winberg who finished 9th in men's park in 2024. Sweden has yet to participate in women's events in the sport.

Games	Skateboarders	Events	Gold	Silver	Bronze	Total	Ranking
2020 Tokyo	1	1/4	0	0	0	0	
2024 Paris	1	1/4	0	0	0	0	
Total			0	0	0	0	–

=== Swimming ===
==== Long course swimming ====
Sweden has competed in swimming in every Olympic games since 1900, except for 1904.

Sweden's most successful swimmer is Sarah Sjöström who has won 3 gold, 2 silver and 1 bronze medal between 2016 and 2024. She won her gold medals in women's 100m butterfly in 2016 and in 50 m freestyle and 100 m freestyle in 2024.

Sweden has two double Olympic champions in the sport; Håkan Malmrot won men's 200m breaststroke and 400m breaststroke in 1920 and Gunnar Larsson won men's 200m medley and 400m medley in 1972.

Arne Borg and Anders Holmertz are the male Swedish swimmers with most Olympic medals. Arne Borg won 1 gold, 2 silver and 2 bronze medals between 1924 and 1928. He won his gold in men's 1500m freestyle in 1928. Anders Holmertz won 4 silver and 1 bronze medal between 1988 and 1996.

The remaining Swedish Olympic champions in the sport are Pär Arvidsson who won gold in men's 100m butterfly in 1980, Bengt Baron who won men's 100m backstroke in 1980 and Lars Frölander who won men's 100m butterfly in 2000.

The most participations in the sport by Swedish athletes were 6, by Lars Frölander between 1992 and 2012 and Therese Alshammar between 1996 and 2016.

Games	Swimmers	Events	Gold	Silver	Bronze	Total	Ranking
1900 Paris	1	3/7	0	0	0	0	
1908 London	12	6/6	0	0	2	2	7
1912 Stockholm	24	8/9	0	1	0	1	6
1920 Antwerp	13	10/10	2	2	1	5	2
1924 Paris	14	10/11	0	2	2	4	4
1928 Amsterdam	9	7/11	1	0	1	2	5
1932 Los Angeles	2	3/11	0	0	0	0	
1936 Berlin	5	3/11	0	0	0	0	
1948 London	8	9/11	0	0	0	0	
1952 Helsinki	12	9/11	0	0	2	2	8
1956 Melbourne	5	4/13	0	0	0	0	
1960 Rome	15	12/15	0	1	0	1	7
1964 Tokyo	14	8/18	0	0	0	0	
1968 Mexico City	16	23/29	0	0	0	0	
1972 Munich	15	19/29	2	0	0	2	5
1976 Montreal	18	20/26	0	0	0	0	
1980 Moscow	24	22/26	2	2	1	5	3
1984 Los Angeles	24	27/29	0	0	2	2	9
1988 Seoul	18	18/31	0	1	0	1	=14
1992 Barcelona	17	17/31	0	2	1	3	10
1996 Atlanta	18	18/32	0	1	0	1	=16
2000 Sydney	16	15/32	1	2	1	4	7
2004 Athens	15	13/32	0	0	0	0	
2008 Beijing	17	21/32	0	0	0	0	
2012 London	12	15/32	0	0	0	0	
2016 Rio de Janeiro	11	14/32	1	1	1	3	10
2020 Tokyo	10	14/35	0	1	0	1	=17
2024 Paris	12	16/35	2	0	0	2	8
Total			11	16	14	41	13

Sweden also participated in swimming at the 1906 Intercalated Games without winning any medals in the discipline. IOC has retroactively decided to no longer recognize those games as official Olympic games.

==== Marathon swimming ====
Marathon swimming has been included in the Olympic programme since 2008. Sweden has participated once, Eva Berglund participated in the women's event in 2008 and finished 18th.

Victor Johansson was scheduled to participate in the men's event in 2024 but did not start due to the water quality in the Seine river.

Games	Swimmers	Events	Gold	Silver	Bronze	Total	Ranking
2008 Beijing	1	1/2	0	0	0	0	
Total			0	0	0	0	–

=== Table tennis ===
Table tennis has been included in the Olympic programme since 1988. Sweden has participated every time. They have won five medals so far; one gold, three silver and one bronze.

Jan-Ove Waldner won gold in men's singles in 1992 and silver in men's singles in 2000. Truls Möregårdh won two silver medals in 2024, one in men's singles and another in men's team together with Kristian Karlsson and Anton Källberg. Erik Lindh won a bronze medal in men's singles in 1988.

Sweden's best placement in a women's event was 5th by Filippa Bergand, Linda Bergström and Christina Källberg in women's team in 2024. The best placement in a mixed event was also 5th, by Kristian Karlsson and Christina Källberg in mixed doubles in 2024.

The Swedish athlete with most participations in the sport was Jörgen Persson who participated in 7 Olympic Games between 1988 and 2012.

Games	Players	Events	Gold	Silver	Bronze	Total	Ranking
1988 Seoul	4	2/4	0	0	1	1	4
1992 Barcelona	6	4/4	1	0	0	1	2
1996 Atlanta	7	4/4	0	0	0	0	
2000 Sydney	6	4/4	0	1	0	1	2
2004 Athens	3	2/4	0	0	0	0	
2008 Beijing	3	2/4	0	0	0	0	
2012 London	3	2/4	0	0	0	0	
2016 Rio de Janeiro	5	3/4	0	0	0	0	
2020 Tokyo	5	3/5	0	0	0	0	
2024 Paris	6	5/5	0	2	0	2	2
Total			1	3	1	5	4

=== Taekwondo ===
Taekwondo has been included in the Olympic programme since 2000. Sweden has participated in the sport several times since then but has yet to win any medals in the sport.

The best placement was 4th by Roman Livaja in men's middleweight in 2000. The best placement in a women's event was 5th, both by Karolina Kedzierska in women's heavyweight in 2008 and by Nikita Glasnović in women's featherweight in 2016.

Games	Practitioners	Events	Gold	Silver	Bronze	Total	Ranking
2000 Sydney	2	2/8	0	0	0	0	
2008 Beijing	2	2/8	0	0	0	0	
2012 London	2	2/8	0	0	0	0	
2016 Rio de Janeiro	2	2/8	0	0	0	0	
Total			0	0	0	0	–

=== Tennis ===
Tennis was originally included in the Olympic programme between 1896 and 1924. Tennis returned to the games in 1988 and has remained in the programme since then. Sweden's first participation came in 1908, and Sweden has participated in the sport every time it has been included in the programme since then except for 2024.

Sweden has won eight medals in the sport, three silver and five bronze. The Swedish tennis player with most Olympic medals was Gunnar Setterwall who won two silver medals and two bronze medals. With Sigrid Fick he won silver in mixed outdoor doubles and bronze in mixed indoor doubles in 1912. He also won silver with Carl Kempe in men's indoor doubles the same year and bronze with Wollmar Boström in men's indoor doubles in 1908. Sweden's remaining silver medal was won by Simon Aspelin and Thomas Johansson in men's doubles in 2008.

Games	Players	Events	Gold	Silver	Bronze	Total	Ranking
1908 London	4	3/6	0	0	2	2	3
1912 Stockholm	17	8/8	0	2	1	3	5
1920 Antwerp	8	5/5	0	0	0	0	
1924 Paris	4	5/5	0	0	0	0	
1988 Seoul	3	3/4	0	0	2	2	6
1992 Barcelona	6	4/4	0	0	0	0	
1996 Atlanta	4	2/4	0	0	0	0	
2000 Sydney	5	2/4	0	0	0	0	
2004 Athens	4	2/4	0	0	0	0	
2008 Beijing	5	3/4	0	1	0	1	=5
2012 London	3	3/5	0	0	0	0	
2016 Rio de Janeiro	1	1/5	0	0	0	0	
2020 Tokyo	1	1/5	0	0	0	0	
Total			0	3	5	8	24

=== Triathlon ===
Triathlon has been included in the Olympic programme since 2000. Sweden has one medal in the sport so far, Lisa Nordén earned the silver medal in the women's event in 2012. Sweden's sole participation in men's events so far was by Joachim Willén who finished 35th in the men's event in 2000.

Games	Triathletes	Events	Gold	Silver	Bronze	Total	Ranking
2000 Sydney	1	1/2	0	0	0	0	
2008 Beijing	1	1/2	0	0	0	0	
2012 London	1	1/2	0	1	0	1	=3
2016 Rio de Janeiro	1	1/2	0	0	0	0	
2024 Paris	1	1/3	0	0	0	0	
Total			0	1	0	1	=12

=== Tug of war ===
Tug of War was contested five times, from the 1900 Olympic games in Paris until the 1920 Olympic games in Antwerp.

Sweden participated twice as its own team - in 1908 and at home in Stockholm in 1912, where Sweden won the gold medal. The winning athletes were Andersson, Bergman, Edman, Fredriksson, Gustafsson, Jonsson, Larsson and Lindström.

At the 1900 Games the three Swedish athletes Nilsson, Söderström och Staaf teamed up with three Danish athletes to form a mixed team that won the gold medal in tug of war.

There were no women's events held in the sport.

Games	Competitors	Events	Gold	Silver	Bronze	Total	Ranking
1908 London	8	1/1	0	0	0	0	
1912 Stockholm	8	1/1	1	0	0	1	1
Total			1	0	0	1	4

Sweden also won the bronze medal in tug of war at the 1906 Intercalated Games. IOC has retroactively decided to no longer recognize those games as official Olympic games.

=== Volleyball ===
==== Beach volleyball ====
Beach volleyball has been included in the Olympic programme since 1996. Sweden has participated four times and has won one gold medal.

Jonatan Hellvig and David Åhman won gold in the men's event in 2024.

Sweden has so far not participated in women's events in the discipline.

Games	Volleyballers	Events	Gold	Silver	Bronze	Total	Ranking
1996 Atlanta	2	1/2	0	0	0	0	
2000 Sydney	2	1/2	0	0	0	0	
2004 Athens	2	1/2	0	0	0	0	
2024 Paris	2	1/2	1	0	0	1	=1
Total			1	0	0	1	6

==== Indoor volleyball ====
Indoor volleyball has been included in the Olympic programme since 1964. Sweden has participated once, Sweden men's national volleyball team finished 7th in the men's event in 1988.

Games	Volleyballers	Events	Gold	Silver	Bronze	Total	Ranking
1988 Seoul	12	1/2	0	0	0	0	
Total			0	0	0	0	–

=== Water polo ===
Water polo has been included in the Olympic programme since 1900 with the exception of the 1904 Games. Sweden first participated in 1908 and has participated eight times in total.

Sweden men's national water polo team has won three medals in the men's event, a silver in 1912 and bronzes in 1908 and 1920.

Sweden's most successful athletes in the sport are Robert Andersson, Pontus Hanson, Harald Julin and Torsten Kumfeldt who all have one silver and two bronze medals. They participated together all three times Sweden men's national water polo team managed to medal.

Sweden has yet to participate in women's events in the sport.

Games	Players	Events	Gold	Silver	Bronze	Total	Ranking
1908 London	7	1/1	0	0	1	1	3
1912 Stockholm	7	1/1	0	1	0	1	2
1920 Antwerp	10	1/1	0	0	1	1	3
1924 Paris	8	1/1	0	0	0	0	
1936 Berlin	10	1/1	0	0	0	0	
1948 London	10	1/1	0	0	0	0	
1952 Helsinki	8	1/1	0	0	0	0	
1980 Moscow	11	1/1	0	0	0	0	
Total			0	1	2	3	18

=== Weightlifting ===
Weightlifting was first included in the Olympic programme at the inaugural 1896 Summer Olympics. It was excluded from the 1900, 1908 and 1912 Games but have been included every other time. Sweden first participated in the sport in 1920 and has participated most times since then.

Sweden has won four medals in the sport, all bronze. Albert Pettersson won bronze in men's middleweight in 1920 and Erik Pettersson won bronze in men's light heavyweight the same year. Gösta Magnusson won bronze in men's light heavyweight in 1948 and Hans Bettembourg won bronze in men's middle heavyweight in 1972.

Sweden's best placement in a women's event was by Patricia Strenius who finished 4th in women's light heavyweight in 2020.

Games	Weightlifters	Events	Gold	Silver	Bronze	Total	Ranking
1920 Antwerp	6	5/5	0	0	2	2	7
1924 Paris	5	5/5	0	0	0	0	
1928 Amsterdam	2	2/5	0	0	0	0	
1936 Berlin	2	2/5	0	0	0	0	
1948 London	4	4/6	0	0	1	1	=5
1952 Helsinki	7	7/7	0	0	0	0	
1956 Melbourne	1	1/7	0	0	0	0	
1960 Rome	1	1/7	0	0	0	0	
1964 Tokyo	3	3/7	0	0	0	0	
1968 Mexico City	2	2/7	0	0	0	0	
1972 Munich	2	2/9	0	0	1	1	=10
1976 Montreal	5	4/9	0	0	0	0	
1980 Moscow	6	5/10	0	0	0	0	
1984 Los Angeles	6	5/10	0	0	0	0	
1988 Seoul	3	3/10	0	0	0	0	
1992 Barcelona	5	4/10	0	0	0	0	
1996 Atlanta	2	2/10	0	0	0	0	
2016 Rio de Janeiro	1	1/15	0	0	0	0	
2020 Tokyo	1	1/14	0	0	0	0	
Total			0	0	4	4	63

Sweden also participated in weightlifting at the 1906 Intercalated Games without winning any medals in the sport. The IOC has retroactively decided to no longer recognize those games as official Olympic games.

=== Wrestling ===
Wrestling was included in the inaugural 1896 Summer Olympic programme and has been included in all Summer Games since then except for 1900. Sweden first participated in the sport in 1908 and has participated every time since then.

Two Swedish wrestlers have won three Olympic titles. Ivar Johansson won men's Greco-Roman welterweight and freestyle middleweight in 1932 and Greco-Roman middleweight in 1936. Carl Westergren won his three gold medals in Greco-Roman style, in middleweight in 1920, light heavyweight in 1924 and heavyweight in 1932.

The Swedish wrestler who has won most medals was Rudolf Svensson who won 2 gold and 2 silver medals. His gold medals were won in men's Greco-Roman heavyweight in 1928 and light heavyweight in 1932. His silver medals were both won in 1924, in men's Greco-Roman light heavyweight and freestyle light heavyweight.

Three additional Swedish wrestlers are double Olympic champions. Axel Grönberg won men's Greco-Roman middleweight in both 1948 and 1952. Claes Johanson won men's Greco-Roman middleweight in 1912 and light heavyweight in 1920. Johan Richthoff won men's freestyle heavyweight in both 1928 and 1932.

Sweden's most successful female wrestlers are Jenny Fransson who won bronze in women's freestyle 69 kg and Sofia Mattsson who won bronze in women's freestyle 53 kg, both in 2016.

Most Swedish Olympic participations in the sport is four, a record shared between Bertil Antonsson (1948–1960), Thomas Johansson (1984–1996), Sofia Mattsson (2008–2020) and Carl Westergren (1920–1932).

Games	Wrestlers	Events	Gold	Silver	Bronze	Total	Ranking
1908 London	9	4/9	1	1	0	2	4
1912 Stockholm	34	5/5	1	2	1	4	2
1920 Antwerp	13	9/10	3	1	2	6	2
1924 Paris	13	11/13	1	2	1	4	4
1928 Amsterdam	9	9/13	3	1	0	4	2
1932 Los Angeles	13	14/14	6	1	3	10	1
1936 Berlin	14	14/14	4	3	2	9	1
1948 London	16	16/16	5	5	3	13	2
1952 Helsinki	16	16/16	3	4	1	8	2
1956 Melbourne	10	12/16	0	1	3	4	7
1960 Rome	12	14/16	0	0	2	2	12
1964 Tokyo	9	9/16	0	1	1	2	9
1968 Mexico City	7	8/16	0	0	0	0	
1972 Munich	7	9/20	0	1	1	2	=8
1976 Montreal	8	10/20	0	0	0	0	
1980 Moscow	8	9/20	0	0	2	2	=11
1984 Los Angeles	11	14/20	0	2	2	4	9
1988 Seoul	10	10/20	0	0	1	1	=16
1992 Barcelona	8	8/20	0	1	1	2	=12
1996 Atlanta	7	7/20	0	0	1	1	=19
2000 Sydney	5	5/16	1	0	0	1	=7
2004 Athens	7	7/18	0	1	0	1	=15
2008 Beijing	5	5/18	0	0	0	0	
2012 London	6	6/18	0	0	2	2	20
2016 Rio de Janeiro	7	7/18	0	0	2	2	=17
2020 Tokyo	3	3/18	0	0	0	0	
2024 Paris	0	0/18	0	0	0	0	
Total			28	27	31	86	6

== Summary by Winter sport ==
=== Non-participations ===
Sweden has participated in all winter sports except Skeleton and Ski Mountaineering.

(They also didn't participate in Military Patrol in 1924, which sometimes is counted separately from Biathlon.)

=== Alpine skiing ===
Alpine skiing has been included in the Olympic programme since 1936. Sweden has participated in the sport in every time except for 1960.

Sweden's most successful Olympic athletes in alpine skiing are Pernilla Wiberg (2 gold, 1 silver), Ingemar Stenmark (2 gold, 1 bronze) and Anja Pärson (1 gold, 1 silver, 4 bronze).

Pernilla Wiberg won her gold medals in women's giant slalom in 1992 and women's combined in 1994. Ingemar Stenmark won both men's giant slalom and men's slalom in 1980. Anja Pärson won gold in women's slalom in 2006.

Sweden's remaining Olympic champions in alpine skiing are Frida Hansdotter who won women's slalom in 2018, André Myhrer who won men's slalom the same year and Sara Hector who won women's giant slalom in 2022.

The most Olympic participations in the sport by Swedish athletes are 5, by Fredrik Nyberg between 1992 and 2006, and by Patrik Järbyn between 1994 and 2010.

Games	Alpine skiers	Events	Gold	Silver	Bronze	Total	Ranking
1936 Garmisch-Partenkirchen	1	1/2	0	0	0	0	
1948 St. Moritz	6	6/6	0	0	0	0	
1952 Oslo	9	6/6	0	0	0	0	
1956 Cortina d'Ampezzo	8	6/6	0	0	1	1	=5
1964 Innsbruck	4	3/6	0	0	0	0	
1968 Grenoble	6	5/6	0	0	0	0	
1972 Sapporo	4	6/6	0	0	0	0	
1976 Innsbruck	4	2/6	0	0	1	1	=7
1980 Lake Placid	6	4/6	2	0	0	2	3
1984 Sarajevo	8	3/6	0	0	0	0	
1988 Calgary	12	7/10	0	0	1	1	=8
1992 Albertville	8	6/10	1	0	0	1	=4
1994 Lillehammer	11	10/10	1	0	0	1	7
1998 Nagano	7	10/10	0	1	0	1	8
2002 Salt Lake City	9	9/10	0	1	1	2	7
2006 Turin	13	10/10	1	0	3	4	5
2010 Vancouver	13	10/10	0	0	2	2	9
2014 Sochi	12	7/10	0	0	0	0	
2018 Pyeongchang	10	7/11	2	0	0	2	3
2022 Beijing	8	5/11	1	0	0	1	=4
2026 Milano Cortina	7	4/10	0	1	1	2	=7
Total			8	3	10	21	8

=== Biathlon ===
An event in military patrol, a precursor sport to biathlon, was held at the 1924 Winter Olympics without Swedish participation. Biathlon arrived as its own sport at the 1960 Winter Olympics. Sweden participated then and has continued to do so ever since.

There was only one biathlon event in the 1960 Winter Olympics. Klas Lestander won the gold in that event, men's individual, and thus won Sweden's first gold in biathlon.

Sweden's most successful athlete in the sport is Hanna Öberg with 2 gold and 2 silver. She won gold in women's individual in 2018 and gold together with her sister Elvira Öberg as well as Mona Brorsson and Linn Persson in women's relay in 2022. Elvira is the second most successful Swedish athlete in the sport with 3 silver medals on top of her relay gold.

Sebastian Samuelsson and Martin Ponsiluoma are Sweden's most successful male biathletes, with 1 gold, 1 silver and 1 bronze medal each. Sebastian Samuelsson won gold together with Peppe Femling, Fredrik Lindström and Jesper Nelin in men's relay in 2018. Martin Ponsiluoma won gold in men's pursuit in 2026.

The two remaining Swedish biathletes to win Olympic gold are Anna-Carin Olofsson-Zidek who won gold in women's mass start in 2006 and Björn Ferry who won gold in men's pursuit in 2010.

The most participations in the sport by a Swedish biathlete is 4, shared between Leif Andersson (1984–1994), Carl Johan Bergman (2002–2014), Björn Ferry (2002–2014) and Mikael Löfgren (1988–1998).

Games	Biathletes	Events	Gold	Silver	Bronze	Total	Ranking
1960 Squaw Valley	4	1/1	1	0	0	1	1
1964 Innsbruck	4	1/1	0	0	0	0	
1968 Grenoble	5	2/2	0	0	1	1	3
1972 Sapporo	4	2/2	0	0	1	1	5
1976 Innsbruck	4	2/2	0	0	0	0	
1980 Lake Placid	4	3/3	0	0	0	0	
1984 Sarajevo	5	3/3	0	0	0	0	
1988 Calgary	4	3/3	0	0	0	0	
1992 Albertville	10	6/6	0	0	2	2	4
1994 Lillehammer	10	6/6	0	0	0	0	
1998 Nagano	8	6/6	0	0	0	0	
2002 Salt Lake City	5	7/8	0	0	2	2	5
2006 Turin	6	9/10	1	1	0	2	4
2010 Vancouver	10	10/10	1	0	1	2	6
2014 Sochi	5	5/11	0	0	0	0	
2018 Pyeongchang	10	11/11	2	2	0	4	3
2022 Beijing	9	11/11	1	3	0	4	3
2026 Milano Cortina	9	11/11	1	1	1	3	3
Total			7	7	8	22	6

=== Bobsleigh ===
Bobsleigh has been included in the Olympic programme since the inaugural 1924 Winter Olympics, with the exception of the 1960 Games. Sweden first participated in the sport in 1952 and has participated several times since then.

Sweden's best placement in the sport is 6th, by Fernström, Holmström, Landgren and Lapidoth in four-man in 1952 and by Carl-Erik Eriksson and Jan Johansson in two-man in 1972.

The best placement in a women's event was 14th, by Lina Engren and Karin Margareta Olsson in two-woman in 2002.

The Swedish athlete with most participations in the sport was Carl-Erik Eriksson who participated in 6 Olympic Games between 1964 and 1984.

Games	Bobsledders	Events	Gold	Silver	Bronze	Total	Ranking
1952 Oslo	9	2/2	0	0	0	0	
1956 Cortina d'Ampezzo	9	2/2	0	0	0	0	
1964 Innsbruck	6	2/2	0	0	0	0	
1968 Grenoble	6	2/2	0	0	0	0	
1972 Sapporo	4	2/2	0	0	0	0	
1976 Innsbruck	4	2/2	0	0	0	0	
1980 Lake Placid	4	2/2	0	0	0	0	
1984 Sarajevo	4	2/2	0	0	0	0	
1988 Calgary	2	1/2	0	0	0	0	
1994 Lillehammer	4	2/2	0	0	0	0	
2002 Salt Lake City	2	1/3	0	0	0	0	
Total			0	0	0	0	–

=== Cross-country skiing ===
Cross-country skiing has been included in the Olympic programme since the inaugural 1924 Winter Olympics. Sweden has participated in the sport every time it has been included in the programme and has even participated in every event held in the sport.

Sweden has had four medal sweeps in the sport, men's 50 km in 1928 and 1936, men's 18 km in 1948 and women's sprint in 2026.

The Swedish cross-country skiers with most Olympic medals are Sixten Jernberg (4 gold, 3 silver, 2 bronze) and Charlotte Kalla (3 gold, 6 silver). Gunde Svan (4 gold, 1 silver, 1 bronze) and Thomas Wassberg (4 gold) have also won four Olympic titles in cross-country skiing.

The Swedish athlete with most participations in the sport is Torgny Mogren who participated in 5 Olympic Games between 1984 and 1998.

Games	Skiers	Events	Gold	Silver	Bronze	Total	Ranking
1924 Chamonix	6	2/2	0	0	0	0	
1928 St. Moritz	6	2/2	1	1	1	3	=1
1932 Lake Placid	6	2/2	1	1	0	2	2
1936 Garmisch-Partenkirchen	9	3/3	2	1	2	5	1
1948 St. Moritz	11	3/3	3	2	1	6	1
1952 Oslo	15	4/4	0	0	1	1	3
1956 Cortina d'Ampezzo	11	6/6	1	2	3	6	3
1960 Squaw Valley	12	6/6	2	2	1	5	1
1964 Innsbruck	11	7/7	2	2	1	5	3
1968 Grenoble	11	7/7	2	2	1	5	2
1972 Sapporo	11	7/7	1	0	0	1	3
1976 Innsbruck	11	7/7	0	0	1	1	6
1980 Lake Placid	11	7/7	1	0	0	1	3
1984 Sarajevo	13	8/8	3	1	1	5	2
1988 Calgary	12	8/8	2	0	0	2	2
1992 Albertville	12	10/10	0	0	1	1	5
1994 Lillehammer	13	10/10	0	0	0	0	
1998 Nagano	11	10/10	0	1	0	1	7
2002 Salt Lake City	16	12/12	0	0	1	1	=9
2006 Turin	15	12/12	3	0	2	5	1
2010 Vancouver	15	12/12	3	2	2	7	2
2014 Sochi	16	12/12	2	5	4	11	2
2018 Pyeongchang	14	12/12	2	3	1	6	2
2022 Beijing	16	12/12	1	2	1	4	4
2026 Milano Cortina	16	12/12	5	4	1	10	2
Total			37	31	26	94	2

=== Curling ===
Curling was included in the Olympic programme during the inaugural 1924 Winter Olympics. It didn't return until 1998, but has remained in the Games since then. Sweden has participated in the sport every time it has been included in the programme.

Sweden's most successful curlers are Agnes Knochenhauer and Rasmus Wranå.

Agnes Knochenhauer won 2 gold, 1 silver and 1 bronze medal, all in the women's event. She won both her gold medals together with Anna Hasselborg, Sofia Scharback and Sara McManus, in 2018 with Jennie Wåhlin and in 2026 with Johanna Heldin.

Rasmus Wranå has won 2 gold and 1 silver medal. He won one gold medal together with Niklas Edin, Oskar Eriksson, Daniel Magnusson, Christoffer Sundgren in the men's event in 2022 and one with his sister Isabella Wranå in the mixed doubles event in 2026.

Sweden's remaining 2 gold medals were won by Anna Le Moine, Cathrine Lindahl, Eva Lund and Anette Norberg who won two gold medals together in the women's event; in 2006 with Ulrika Bergman and in 2010 with Kajsa Bergström.

Niklas Edin (1 gold, 1 silver, 1 bronze) and Oskar Eriksson (1 gold, 1 silver, 2 bronze) are the Swedish curlers with most Olympic participations in the sport; they participated together in five Olympic Games between 2010 and 2026.

Games	Curlers	Events	Gold	Silver	Bronze	Total	Ranking
1924 Chamonix	8	1/1	0	1	0	1	2
1998 Nagano	10	2/2	0	0	1	1	=4
2002 Salt Lake City	10	2/2	0	0	0	0	
2006 Turin	10	2/2	1	0	0	1	2
2010 Vancouver	10	2/2	1	0	0	1	2
2014 Sochi	10	2/2	0	1	1	2	=2
2018 Pyeongchang	10	2/3	1	1	0	2	1
2022 Beijing	11	3/3	1	0	2	3	2
2026 Milano Cortina	11	3/3	2	0	0	2	1
Total			6	3	4	13	2

=== Figure skating ===
Figure skating was first included in the Olympic programme in the 1908 and 1920 Summer Olympics. It was moved to the Winter Olympics with the inaugural 1924 Winter Olympics and has been included in every Winter Olympic Games. Sweden did participate in the sport in its inaugural 1908 competitions and has participated most times since then.

Sweden has had one medal sweep in the sport, men's singles during the 1908 Summer Olympics.

Sweden's most successful athlete in the sport was Gillis Grafström who won gold in men's singles in 1920, 1924 and 1928 and silver in the same discipline in 1932. He's the only figure skater with four medals in the same event. He's also the Swedish figure skater with most Olympic participations in the sport with those four.

The other two Swedish Olympic champions in the sport are Ulrich Salchow who won gold in men's singles in 1908 and Magda Julin who won gold in ladies' singles in 1920.

Games	Figure skaters	Events	Gold	Silver	Bronze	Total	Ranking
1908 London	4	2/4	1	1	1	3	2
1920 Antwerp	4	2/3	2	1	0	3	1
1924 Chamonix	1	1/3	1	0	0	1	2
1928 St. Moritz	1	1/3	1	0	0	1	=1
1932 Lake Placid	2	2/3	0	1	0	1	5
1936 Garmisch-Partenkirchen	1	1/3	0	0	1	1	=5
1952 Oslo	2	1/3	0	0	0	0	
1956 Cortina d'Ampezzo	1	1/3	0	0	0	0	
1964 Innsbruck	1	1/3	0	0	0	0	
1968 Grenoble	1	1/3	0	0	0	0	
1972 Sapporo	1	1/3	0	0	0	0	
1980 Lake Placid	1	1/4	0	0	0	0	
1984 Sarajevo	2	2/4	0	0	0	0	
1988 Calgary	2	2/4	0	0	0	0	
1992 Albertville	1	1/4	0	0	0	0	
1998 Nagano	1	1/4	0	0	0	0	
2006 Turin	1	1/4	0	0	0	0	
2010 Vancouver	1	1/4	0	0	0	0	
2014 Sochi	2	2/5	0	0	0	0	
2018 Pyeongchang	1	1/5	0	0	0	0	
2022 Beijing	2	2/5	0	0	0	0	
2026 Milano Cortina	3	2/5	0	0	0	0	
Total			5	3	2	10	9

=== Freestyle skiing ===
Freestyle skiing has been included in the Olympic programme since 1992. Sweden has participated in the sport in every time it has been included in the Olympic programme.

Sweden has won seven medals in the sport, of which two are gold. Sandra Näslund won gold in 2022 and bronze in 2026, both in women's ski cross. Walter Wallberg won gold in men's moguls in 2022.

Marie Lindgren won silver in women's aerials in 1994. Anna Holmlund won bronze in women's ski cross in 2014. Henrik Harlaut won bronze in men's big air and Jesper Tjäder in men's slopestyle, both in 2022.

Games	Skiers	Events	Gold	Silver	Bronze	Total	Ranking
1992 Albertville	4	2/2	0	0	0	0	
1994 Lillehammer	8	4/4	0	1	0	1	=6
1998 Nagano	8	3/4	0	0	0	0	
2002 Salt Lake City	4	3/4	0	0	0	0	
2006 Turin	4	2/4	0	0	0	0	
2010 Vancouver	8	3/6	0	0	0	0	
2014 Sochi	11	5/10	0	0	1	1	=7
2018 Pyeongchang	14	5/10	0	0	0	0	
2022 Beijing	14	5/13	2	0	2	4	4
2026 Milano Cortina	10	8/14	0	0	1	1	=11
Total			2	1	4	7	9

=== Ice hockey ===
Ice hockey was first included in the Olympic programme in the 1920 Summer Olympics. It was moved to the Winter Olympics with the inaugural 1924 Winter Olympics and has been included in every Winter Olympic Games.

Sweden has participated in every event in the sport except for the 1932 men's tournament (due to the Great Depression) and the 1976 men's tournament due to a boycott against amateur rules.

Sweden's men's team has won the gold twice, in 1994 and in 2006. Sweden's women's team's best result was in 2006 when they won the silver.

Sweden's most successful athletes in the sport are Peter Forsberg, Jörgen Jönsson and Kenny Jönsson with two gold medals. Sweden's most successful women athletes were 11 players who participated in 2002 winning bronze and 2006 winning silver. The Swedish athlete with most participations in the sport was Daniel Alfredsson who participated in 5 Olympic Games between 1998 and 2014.

Games	Players	Events	Gold	Silver	Bronze	Total	Ranking
1920 Antwerp	11	1/1	0	0	0	0	
1924 Chamonix	10	1/1	0	0	0	0	
1928 St. Moritz	12	1/1	0	1	0	1	2
1936 Garmisch-Partenkirchen	13	1/1	0	0	0	0	
1948 St. Moritz	16	1/1	0	0	0	0	
1952 Oslo	17	1/1	0	0	1	1	3
1956 Cortina d'Ampezzo	17	1/1	0	0	0	0	
1960 Squaw Valley	17	1/1	0	0	0	0	
1964 Innsbruck	17	1/1	0	1	0	1	2
1968 Grenoble	18	1/1	0	0	0	0	
1972 Sapporo	20	1/1	0	0	0	0	
1980 Lake Placid	20	1/1	0	0	1	1	3
1984 Sarajevo	20	1/1	0	0	1	1	3
1988 Calgary	22	1/1	0	0	1	1	3
1992 Albertville	23	1/1	0	0	0	0	
1994 Lillehammer	23	1/1	1	0	0	1	1
1998 Nagano	43	2/2	0	0	0	0	
2002 Salt Lake City	43	2/2	0	0	1	1	=3
2006 Turin	44	2/2	1	1	0	2	1
2010 Vancouver	44	2/2	0	0	0	0	
2014 Sochi	46	2/2	0	1	0	1	=2
2018 Pyeongchang	48	2/2	0	0	0	0	
2022 Beijing	48	2/2	0	0	0	0	
2026 Beijing	48	2/2	0	0	0	0	
Total			2	4	5	11	4

=== Luge ===
Luge has been included in the Olympic programme since 1964. Sweden first participated in the sport in 1968 and has participated several times since then.

Sweden's best placement in the sport is 6th, by Hans Kohala and Carl-Johan Lindqvist in doubles in 1992.

The best placement in a women's event was 13th, both by Berit Salomonsson in women's singles in 1968 and Agneta Lindskog in women's singles in 1980.

Games	Lugers	Events	Gold	Silver	Bronze	Total	Ranking
1968 Grenoble	5	3/3	0	0	0	0	
1976 Innsbruck	5	3/3	0	0	0	0	
1980 Lake Placid	4	3/3	0	0	0	0	
1984 Sarajevo	2	2/3	0	0	0	0	
1988 Calgary	2	1/3	0	0	0	0	
1992 Albertville	3	2/3	0	0	0	0	
1994 Lillehammer	5	2/3	0	0	0	0	
1998 Nagano	3	2/3	0	0	0	0	
2002 Salt Lake City	2	2/3	0	0	0	0	
2022 Beijing	2	2/4	0	0	0	0	
2026 Milano Cortina	2	2/5	0	0	0	0	
Total			0	0	0	0	–

=== Nordic combined ===
Nordic combined has been included in the Olympic programme since the inaugural 1924 Winter Games. Sweden participated in the inaugural games and participated many times in the beginning but they have not participated in the sport since the 1972 Games.

Sweden has won two medals in the sport. Bengt Eriksson won silver at the individual event in 1956 and Sven Israelsson won bronze in the individual event in 1948.

There are no women's events in the sport.

Games	Skiers	Events	Gold	Silver	Bronze	Total	Ranking
1924 Chamonix	3	1/1	0	0	0	0	
1928 St. Moritz	1	1/1	0	0	0	0	
1932 Lake Placid	2	1/1	0	0	0	0	
1936 Garmisch-Partenkirchen	3	1/1	0	0	0	0	
1948 St. Moritz	3	1/1	0	0	1	1	2
1952 Oslo	2	1/1	0	0	0	0	
1956 Cortina d'Ampezzo	1	1/1	0	1	0	1	2
1960 Squaw Valley	2	1/1	0	0	0	0	
1972 Sapporo	1	1/1	0	0	0	0	
Total			0	1	1	2	13

=== Short track speed skating ===
Short track speed skating was introduced to the Olympic programme in 1992. Sweden has participated in the sport 3 times.

The best placement was by Martin Johansson who finished 7th in men's 500 metres in 1994. Sweden has yet to participate in women's events in the sport.

Games	Skaters	Events	Gold	Silver	Bronze	Total	Ranking
1994 Lillehammer	1	2/6	0	0	0	0	
1998 Nagano	1	2/6	0	0	0	0	
2002 Salt Lake City	1	3/8	0	0	0	0	
Total			0	0	0	0	–

=== Ski jumping ===
Ski jumping has been included in the Olympic programme since the inaugural 1924 Winter Games. Sweden has participated most times since then.

Sweden has obtained two medals in the sport. Sven Selånger won silver in the event in 1936 and Karl Holmström won bronze in the event in 1952.

Sweden's best placement in a women's event is 4th, by Frida Westman in women's large hill in 2026.

Games	Ski jumpers	Events	Gold	Silver	Bronze	Total	Ranking
1924 Chamonix	4	1/1	0	0	0	0	
1928 St. Moritz	4	1/1	0	0	0	0	
1932 Lake Placid	3	1/1	0	0	0	0	
1936 Garmisch-Partenkirchen	4	1/1	0	1	0	1	2
1948 St. Moritz	4	1/1	0	0	0	0	
1952 Oslo	4	1/1	0	0	1	1	2
1956 Cortina d'Ampezzo	4	1/1	0	0	0	0	
1960 Squaw Valley	4	1/1	0	0	0	0	
1964 Innsbruck	4	2/2	0	0	0	0	
1968 Grenoble	5	2/2	0	0	0	0	
1972 Sapporo	2	2/2	0	0	0	0	
1976 Innsbruck	2	2/2	0	0	0	0	
1980 Lake Placid	1	2/2	0	0	0	0	
1988 Calgary	4	3/3	0	0	0	0	
1992 Albertville	5	3/3	0	0	0	0	
1994 Lillehammer	5	3/3	0	0	0	0	
2022 Beijing	1	1/5	0	0	0	0	
2026 Milano Cortina	1	2/6	0	0	0	0	
Total			0	1	1	2	=13

=== Snowboarding ===
Snowboarding has been included in the Olympic programme since 1998. Sweden has participated in the sport in every time it has been included except for 2026.

Sweden has won one medal in the sport so far, Richard Richardsson won silver in men's parallel giant slalom in 2002. The best placement in a women's event was by Maria Danielsson who finished 6th in women's snowboard cross in 2006.

Games	Snowboarders	Events	Gold	Silver	Bronze	Total	Ranking
1998 Nagano	10	4/4	0	0	0	0	
2002 Salt Lake City	11	4/4	0	1	0	1	4
2006 Turin	14	6/6	0	0	0	0	
2010 Vancouver	1	1/6	0	0	0	0	
2014 Sochi	2	1/10	0	0	0	0	
2018 Pyeongchang	2	2/10	0	0	0	0	
2022 Beijing	2	2/11	0	0	0	0	
Total			0	1	0	1	=19

=== Speed skating ===
Speed skating has been included in the Olympic programme since the inaugural 1924 Winter Olympics. Sweden has participated in the sport every Winter Olympic Games except for 1998 and 2026.

The most successful Swedish speed skater is Tomas Gustafson (3 gold, 1 silver). He won gold in men's 5000m in 1984 and 1988 and gold in men's 10000m in 1988 and silver in the same event in 1984.

Sweden's second most successful speed skater is Nils van der Poel who won gold in men's 5000m and men's 10 000m in 2022.

Sweden's remaining four Olympic titles in the sport all came in men's 10 000m. Åke Seyffarth won gold in 1948, Sigvard Ericsson in 1956, Jonny Nilsson in 1964 and Johnny Höglin in 1968.

Sweden's best placement in a women's event is 4th, by Ann-Sofie Järnström in women's 500m in 1980.

The Swedish athlete with most participations in the sport was Örjan Sandler who participated in 5 Olympic Games between 1964 and 1980.

Games	Skaters	Events	Gold	Silver	Bronze	Total	Ranking
1924 Chamonix	2	4/5	0	0	0	0	
1928 St. Moritz	1	3/3	0	0	0	0	
1932 Lake Placid	1	3/7	0	0	0	0	
1936 Garmisch-Partenkirchen	1	4/4	0	0	0	0	
1948 St. Moritz	6	4/4	1	1	1	3	2
1952 Oslo	9	4/4	0	0	1	1	=4
1956 Cortina d'Ampezzo	7	4/4	1	1	0	2	2
1960 Squaw Valley	9	8/8	0	0	1	1	=6
1964 Innsbruck	10	8/8	1	0	0	1	=3
1968 Grenoble	11	8/8	1	0	1	2	5
1972 Sapporo	11	8/8	0	1	1	2	6
1976 Innsbruck	9	9/9	0	0	0	0	
1980 Lake Placid	10	9/9	0	0	0	0	
1984 Sarajevo	6	9/9	1	1	0	2	4
1988 Calgary	7	8/10	2	0	0	2	3
1992 Albertville	8	8/10	0	0	0	0	
1994 Lillehammer	5	5/10	0	0	0	0	
2002 Salt Lake City	1	2/10	0	0	0	0	
2006 Turin	2	5/12	0	0	0	0	
2010 Vancouver	3	3/12	0	0	0	0	
2014 Sochi	1	2/12	0	0	0	0	
2018 Pyeongchang	1	1/14	0	0	0	0	
2022 Beijing	1	2/14	2	0	0	2	2
Total			9	4	5	18	7

== Medals at subsequently de-recognized competitions ==
Art competitions held at Summer Olympics between 1912 and 1948, and the 1906 Intercalated Games are no longer recognized as official Olympic medal competitions by the IOC.

Sweden won 2 gold and 2 bronze medals in art competitions, and 2 gold, 5 silver and 7 bronze medals at the Intercalated Games.

== See also ==
- List of flag bearers for Sweden at the Olympics
- List of Swedish Olympic medalists
- Category:Olympic competitors for Sweden
- Sweden at the Paralympics
