= Tennis at the 1908 Summer Olympics =

- Date: 6–11 May 1908 (indoor); 6-11 July 1908 (outdoor)
- Edition: 4th
- Surface: Wood (indoor); Grass (outdoor)
- Location: Queen's Club, West Kensington (indoor); All England Club, Wimbledon (outdoor)

Champions

Men's outdoor singles
- Major Ritchie (GBR)

Women's outdoor singles
- Dorothea Lambert Chambers (GBR)

Men's outdoor doubles
- Reginald Doherty / George Hillyard (GBR)

Men's indoor singles
- Arthur Gore (GBR)

Women's indoor singles
- Gwendoline Eastlake-Smith (GBR)

Men's indoor doubles
- Herbert Roper Barrett / Arthur Gore (GBR)
- Summer Olympics

Official 1908 Highlight Film Tennis @ 1:19

Six tennis events were contested at the 1908 Summer Olympics in London, United Kingdom. Indoor tennis events, on what were officially called 'covered courts', were held for the first time, along with the usual outdoor events. Women's events were contested, with women's singles (but not women's doubles or mixed doubles) and indoor women's singles. The indoor events were held at the covered courts of the Queen's Club and began on 6 May 1908, ahead of the official start of the Games while the outdoor tournament was played on grass courts at the All England Lawn Tennis and Croquet Club at Worple Road from 6 July through 11 July 1908. In total 50 players, 40 men and 10 women, competed. Five nations made their tennis debuts, while five more returned to competition for a total of ten nations. Two players, Les Poidevin and Wimbledon champion Anthony Wilding were nominated for Australasia but through administrative bungling they were not entered.

Tennis

== Medal summary ==
=== Events ===
==== Outdoor ====
Event	Gold	Silver	Bronze
Men's outdoor singles	Major Ritchie; Great Britain	Otto Froitzheim; Germany	Wilberforce Eaves; Great Britain
Men's outdoor doubles	Great Britain; Reginald Doherty; George Hillyard	Great Britain; James Cecil Parke; Major Ritchie	Great Britain; Clement Cazalet; Charles Dixon
Women's outdoor singles	Dorothea Lambert Chambers; Great Britain	Dora Boothby; Great Britain	Ruth Winch; Great Britain

==== Indoor ====
Event	Gold	Silver	Bronze
Men's indoor singles	Arthur Gore; Great Britain	George Caridia; Great Britain	Major Ritchie; Great Britain
Men's indoor doubles	Great Britain; Herbert Roper Barrett; Arthur Gore	Great Britain; George Caridia; George Simond	Sweden; Wollmar Boström; Gunnar Setterwall
Women's indoor singles	Gwendoline Eastlake-Smith; Great Britain	Alice Greene; Great Britain	Märtha Adlerstråhle; Sweden

=== Medal table ===
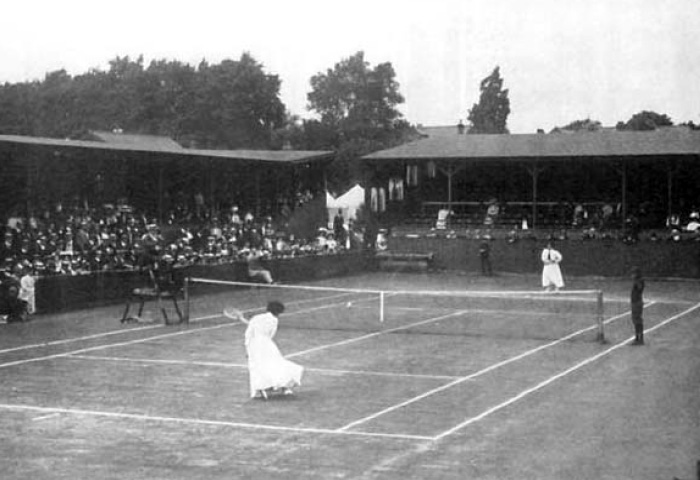
The Women's singles final.

Rank	Nation	Gold	Silver	Bronze	Total
1	Great Britain	6	5	4	15
2	Germany	0	1	0	1
3	Sweden	0	0	2	2
Totals (3 entries)		6	6	6	18

== Participating nations ==
50 players from 10 nations competed.

- Austria (3)
- Bohemia (4)
- Canada (3)
- France (1)
- Germany (5)
- Great Britain (22)
- Hungary (3)
- Netherlands (2)
- South Africa (3)
- Sweden (4)

== See also ==
- Jeu de paume at the 1908 Summer Olympics (real tennis)
