= Fernström =

Fernström is a Swedish surname. Notable people with the surname include:

- Bengt-Göran Fernström (born 1941), Swedish sprinter
- Eric K. Fernström (1901–1995), Swedish ship owner and businessman
  - Fernström Prize
- Felix Fernström (1916–1991), Swedish bobsledder
- John Fernström (1897–1961), Swedish composer
- Kathlene Fernström (born 1986), Swedish association football player
- Linus Fernström (born 1987), Swedish ice hockey goaltender
- Madelyn Fernstrom, American physician, scientist and journalist
