= Elsa Wallenberg =

Swedish tennis player

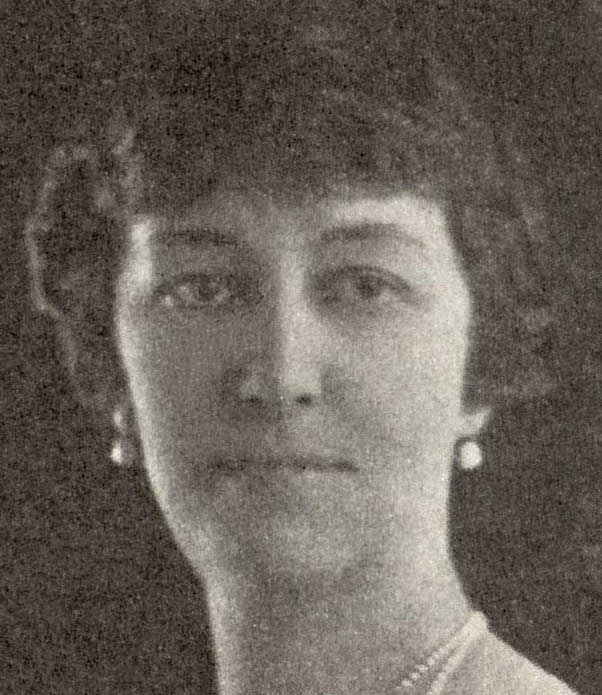
- Born: 26 January 1877 Viby, Hallsberg, Sweden
- Died: 17 October 1951 (aged 74) Stockholm, Sweden

Other tournaments
- Olympic Games: F (1908)

Elsa Wallenberg (née Lilliehöök, 26 January 1877 – 17 October 1951) was a Swedish tennis player who competed in the indoor singles event at the 1908 Summer Olympics. She reached the semifinal in which she lost to eventual Olympic champion Gwendoline Eastlake-Smith. In the bronze medal match Wallenberg lost to compatriot Märtha Adlerstråhle.

She was married to Axel Wallenberg (1874-1963). They were the parents of Gustaf Wally.
