= Tennis at the 1908 Summer Olympics – Women's indoor singles =

Tennis at the Olympics

Women's indoor singles tennis at the Games of the IV Olympiad
- Venue: Queen's Club
- Dates: 6–11 May 1908
- Competitors: 9 from 2 nations

Medalists
| 1st place, gold medalist(s) | | Gwendoline Eastlake-Smith; Great Britain |
| 2nd place, silver medalist(s) | | Alice Greene; Great Britain |
| 3rd place, bronze medalist(s) | | Märtha Adlerstråhle; Sweden |

Women's indoor singles
- Tennis at the 1908 Summer Olympics

Events
Outdoor
| Singles | men | women |
| Doubles | men |
Indoor
| Singles | men | women |
| Doubles | men |
- Summer Olympics

The indoor women's singles was one of six lawn tennis events on the Tennis at the 1908 Summer Olympics programme. Nations could enter up to 12 players.

== Draw ==
Key

- Q = Qualifier
- WC = Wild card
- LL = Lucky loser
- Alt = Alternate
- ITF = ITF entry
- PR = Protected ranking
- SR = Special ranking
- SE = Special exempt
- JE = Junior exempt
- JR = Junior Accelerator Programme entrant
- CO = College Accelerator Programme entrant
- NG = Next Gen Accelerator Program entrant
- w/o = Walkover
- r = Retired
- d = Defaulted

=== Draw ===
First round
A Greene (GBR)
R Winch (GBR) | w/o

Quarterfinals
D Lambert Chambers (GBR) | w/o
M Adlerstråhle (SWE)
D Boothby (GBR) | 2 | 2
A Greene (GBR) | 6 | 6
E Wallenberg (SWE) | 11 | 4 | 4
M Coles (GBR) | 9 | 6 | 5^{r}
G Eastlake-Smith (GBR) | 7 | 7
V Pinckney (GBR) | 5 | 5

Semifinals
M Adlerstråhle (SWE) | 1 | 3
A Greene (GBR) | 6 | 6
E Wallenberg (SWE) | 4 | 4
G Eastlake-Smith (GBR) | 6 | 6

Final (gold-medal match)
A Greene (GBR) | 2 | 6 | 0
G Eastlake-Smith (GBR) | 6 | 4 | 6
Bronze-medal match
E Wallenberg (SWE) | 6 | 2 | 3
M Adlerstråhle (SWE) | 1 | 6 | 6
