= Tennis at the 1908 Summer Olympics – Women's outdoor singles =

Tennis at the Olympics

Women's singles tennis at the Games of the IV Olympiad
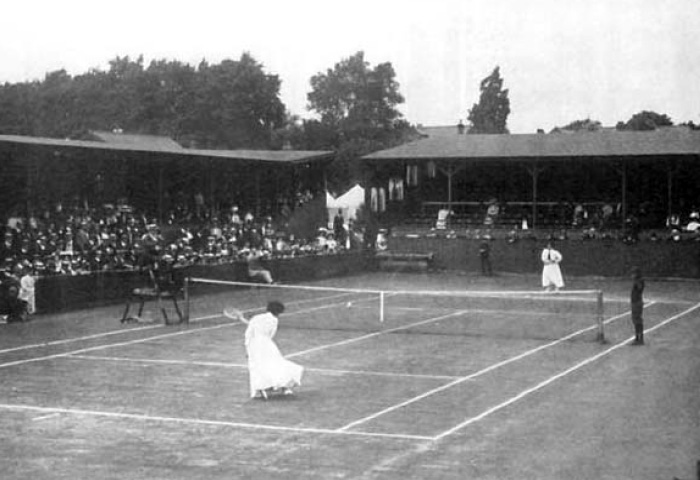
- Final of the Women's singles event between Dorothea Douglass Lambert Chambers and Dora Boothby
- Venue: All England Lawn Tennis and Croquet Club
- Dates: 7 July 1908 (round 1); 9 July 1908 (quarterfinal); 10 July 1908 (semifinal); 11 July 1908 (final)
- Competitors: 5 from 1 nation

Medalists
1st place, gold medalist(s)		Dorothea Douglass Lambert Chambers; Great Britain
2nd place, silver medalist(s)		Dora Boothby; Great Britain
3rd place, bronze medalist(s)		Ruth Winch; Great Britain

Women's outdoor singles
- Tennis at the 1908 Summer Olympics

Events
Outdoor
Singles	men	women
Doubles	men
Indoor
Singles	men	women
Doubles	men
- Summer Olympics

Official 1908 Highlight Film Women's Singles Tennis @ 1:19

The women's singles (outdoor) was one of six lawn tennis events on the Tennis at the 1908 Summer Olympics programme. The number of withdrawals resulted in empty brackets, with one player making it to the final without playing a single match while another had to win two to advance to that point. Nations could enter up to 12 players. In all, 13 women from 4 nations were entered but only 5 from Great Britain competed. The tournament was held from 7 to 11 July at the All England Lawn Tennis and Croquet Club. It was won by Dorothea Douglass Lambert Chambers, with Dora Boothby taking silver and Ruth Winch bronze (the latter two without having won a set).

== Background ==
This was the second appearance of the women's singles tennis. A women's event was held only once during the first three Games (only men's tennis was played in 1896 and 1904), but has been held at every Olympics for which there was a tennis tournament since 1908. Tennis was not a medal sport from 1928 to 1984, though there were demonstration events in 1968 and 1984.

Dorothea Douglass Lambert Chambers had won at Wimbledon in 1903, 1904, and 1906. She would win four more times after the Games.

Great Britain was the only nation that had players actually compete, thereby making it the nation's second appearance. France would also have made its second appearance, and Austria and Hungary their debuts, but the players for those three nations all withdrew.

== Competition format ==
The competition was a single-elimination tournament. The withdrawals resulted in there being only one semifinal loser, so there was no bronze-medal match. All matches were best-of-three sets.

== Schedule ==
The Olympics started three days after the end of the 1908 Wimbledon Championships, a scheduling issue which the Official Report recommended avoiding in the future.

Date	Time	Round
Tuesday, 7 July 1908		Round of 16
Thursday, 9 July 1908		Quarterfinals
Friday, 10 July 1908		Semifinals
Saturday, 11 July 1908		Final

== Draw ==
Key

- Q = Qualifier
- WC = Wild card
- LL = Lucky loser
- Alt = Alternate
- ITF = ITF entry
- PR = Protected ranking
- SR = Special ranking
- SE = Special exempt
- JE = Junior exempt
- JR = Junior Accelerator Programme entrant
- CO = College Accelerator Programme entrant
- NG = Next Gen Accelerator Program entrant
- w/o = Walkover
- r = Retired
- d = Defaulted

=== Draw ===
Boothby took the silver medal, and Winch the bronze, without either winning a single set. Chambers played three matches, winning all six sets. Morton was the only other player to win a match, defeating Greene in the first round before losing to Chambers in the quarterfinals.

First round
A Morton (GBR)	8	6
A Greene (GBR)	6	2
K Cséry (HUN)
F Pietrzykowski (AUT)	w/o
R Winch (GBR)
E Mattuch (AUT)	w/o
K Fenwick (FRA)
M Amende (AUT)	w/o
C Sterry (GBR)
M Madarász (HUN)	w/o

Quarterfinals
D Lambert Chambers (GBR)	6	6
A Morton (GBR)	2	3
K Cséry (HUN)	w/o
R Winch (GBR)
K Fenwick (FRA)
C Sterry (GBR)	w/o
B Hillyard (GBR)	w/o
D Boothby (GBR)

Semifinals
D Lambert Chambers (GBR)	6	6
R Winch (GBR)	1	1
C Fenwick (FRA)	w/o
D Boothby (GBR)

Final (gold-medal match)
D Lambert Chambers (GBR)	6	7
D Boothby (GBR)	1	5
