= Tennis at the 1908 Summer Olympics – Men's indoor singles =

Olympic event

Men's indoor singles tennis at the Games of the IV Olympiad
- Venue: Queen's Club
- Dates: 6–11 May 1908
- Competitors: 10 from 3 nations

Medalists
1st place, gold medalist(s)		Arthur Gore	Great Britain
2nd place, silver medalist(s)		George Caridia	Great Britain
3rd place, bronze medalist(s)		Major Ritchie	Great Britain

Men's indoor singles
- Tennis at the 1908 Summer Olympics

Events
Outdoor
Singles	men	women
Doubles	men
Indoor
Singles	men	women
Doubles	men
- Summer Olympics

The indoor men's singles was one of six lawn tennis events on the Tennis at the 1908 Summer Olympics programme. Nations could enter up to 12 players.

== Draw ==
Key

- Q = Qualifier
- WC = Wild card
- LL = Lucky loser
- Alt = Alternate
- ITF = ITF entry
- PR = Protected ranking
- SR = Special ranking
- SE = Special exempt
- JE = Junior exempt
- JR = Junior Accelerator Programme entrant
- CO = College Accelerator Programme entrant
- NG = Next Gen Accelerator Program entrant
- w/o = Walkover
- r = Retired
- d = Defaulted

=== Draw ===
First round
Major Ritchie (GBR)
Herbert Roper Barrett (GBR)	w/o
Gunnar Setterwall (SWE)	6	6	6
Lionel Escombe (GBR)	2	3	1

Quarterfinals
Anthony Wilding (ANZ)	w/o
Arthur Gore (GBR)
Les Poidevin (ANZ)	w/o
Major Ritchie (GBR)
Gunnar Setterwall (SWE)	2	1	1
George Caridia (GBR)	6	6	6
Wollmar Boström (SWE)	5	2	7
Wilberforce Eaves (GBR)	7	6	9

Semifinals
Arthur Gore (GBR)	4	6	5	6	6
Major Ritchie (GBR)	6	3	7	1	4
George Caridia (GBR)	7	0
Wilberforce Eaves (GBR)	5	0^{r}

Final (gold-medal match)
Arthur Gore (GBR)	6	7	6
George Caridia (GBR)	3	5	4
Bronze-medal match
Major Ritchie (GBR)
Wilberforce Eaves (GBR)	w/o

There was no match for third place. Eaves, described in the Official Report as "obviously out of condition", had not finished his semifinal match after a tight first set played in great heat. Ritchie, therefore, was awarded the bronze medal.
