= Gösta Bengtsson =

Swedish sailor (1897–1984)

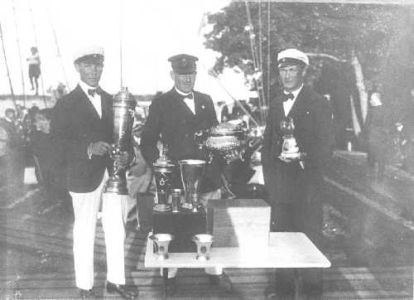
- Gösta Bengtsson with the other crew members of 30m² Skerry cruiser Kullan

Personal information
- Full name: Gösta Ragnar Bengtsson
- Nationality: Swedish
- Born: 25 July 1897 Gothenburg
- Died: 19 January 1984 (aged 86) Stockholm

Sport

Sailing career
- Class: 30m² Skerry Cruiser
- Club: Kullaviks KKK
Medal record
Sailing
Representing Sweden
Olympic Games
Gold medal – first place	1920 Antwerp	30m² Skerry Cruiser
- Updated on 24 February 2015

Gösta Ragnar Bengtsson (25 July 1897 – 19 January 1984) was a Swedish sailor who represented Sweden at the 1920 Summer Olympics in Ostend, Belgium. Bengtsson took the gold in the 30m² Skerry Cruiser.

== Sources ==
- "Gösta Bengtsson Bio, Stats, and Results". Olympic Sports. Sports Reference. Archived from the original on 17 April 2020.
- Belgium Olympic Committee, ed. (1957). Olympic Games 1920 – Officiel Report (PDF). Archived from the original (PDF) on 27 September 2007.
