= Madelyn Fernstrom =

American scientist and broadcast journalist

- Born: Madelyn Hirsch
- Education: · B.A. in Biology, Boston University · Doctorate in nutritional biochemistry, metabolism and neuropharmacology, Massachusetts Institute of Technology
- Occupation: Journalist

Madelyn Hirsch Fernstrom is an American scientist and broadcast journalist, She is also Professor of Psychiatry, Epidemiology and Surgery at the University of Pittsburgh School of Medicine and a Board certified Nutrition Specialist. Since 2013 she has been the Health, Diet and Nutrition editor for NBC News. She appears on NBC Nightly News, Today and MSNBC. Before she became the Health, Diet and Nutrition editor for NBC News she was diet and nutrition editor for Today.

Fernstrom is also an author of the book The Real You Diet.
