= Rolf Steffenburg =

Swedish sailor

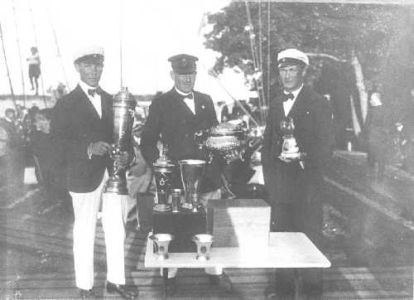
- Rolf Steffenburg with the other crew members of 30m² Skerry cruiser Kullan

Personal information
- Nationality: Swedish
- Born: 14 March 1886 Gävle
- Died: 18 March 1982 (aged 96) Stockholm

Sailing career
- Sport: Sailing
- Club: Kullaviks KKK
- Class: 30m² Skerry cruiser
Medal record
Sailing
Representing Sweden
Olympic Games
Gold medal – first place	1920 Antwerp	30m² Skerry cruiser
- Updated on 24 February 2015

Rolf Steffenburg (14 March 1886 – 18 March 1982) was a sailor from Sweden, who represented his native country at the 1920 Summer Olympics in Antwerp, Belgium. Steffenburg took the gold in the 30m² Skerry Cruiser.

== Sources ==
- "Rolf Steffenburg Bio, Stats, and Results". Olympic Sports. Sports-Reference.com. Archived from the original on 17 April 2020.
- Belgium Olympic Committee, ed. (1957). Olympic Games 1920 – Officiel Report (PDF).
