= Tennis at the 1908 Summer Olympics – Men's indoor doubles =

Tennis at the Olympics

Men's indoor doubles tennis at the Games of the IV Olympiad
- Venue: Queen's Club
- Dates: 6–9 May 1908
- Competitors: 5 teams from 2 nations

Medalists
1st place, gold medalist(s)		Herbert Roper Barrett; Arthur Gore	Great Britain
2nd place, silver medalist(s)		George Caridia; George Simond	Great Britain
3rd place, bronze medalist(s)		Wollmar Boström; Gunnar Setterwall	Sweden

Men's indoor doubles
- Tennis at the 1908 Summer Olympics

Events
Outdoor
Singles	men	women
Doubles	men
Indoor
Singles	men	women
Doubles	men
← 1904 ·	Summer Olympics	· 1912 →

The indoor men's doubles was one of six lawn tennis events on the Tennis at the 1908 Summer Olympics programme. Nations could enter up to 6 pairs (12 players).

== Draw ==
=== Key ===
- Q = Qualifier
- WC = Wild card
- LL = Lucky loser
- Alt = Alternate
- ITF = ITF entry
- PR = Protected ranking
- SR = Special ranking
- SE = Special exempt
- JE = Junior exempt
- JR = Junior Accelerator Programme entrant
- CO = College Accelerator Programme entrant
- NG = Next Gen Accelerator Program entrant
- w/o = Walkover
- r = Retired
- d = Defaulted

=== Finals ===
Quarterfinals
George Caridia (GBR); George Simond (GBR)	2	7	6	10	6
Wilberforce Eaves (GBR); George Hillyard (GBR)	6	9	4	8	4

Semifinals
Wollmar Boström (SWE); Gunnar Setterwall (SWE)	4	7	6	2
George Caridia (GBR); George Simond (GBR)	6	9	2	6
Herbert Roper Barrett (GBR); Arthur Gore (GBR)	0	6	6	6
Lionel Escombe (GBR); Major Ritchie (GBR)	6	4	3	3

Final (gold-medal match)
Herbert Roper Barrett (GBR); Arthur Gore (GBR)	6	2	6	6
George Caridia (GBR); George Simond (GBR)	2	6	3	3
Bronze-medal match
Lionel Escombe (GBR); Major Ritchie (GBR)	6	3	6	0	3
Wollmar Boström (SWE); Gunnar Setterwall (SWE)	4	6	1	6	6

== Sources ==
- Cook, Theodore Andrea (May 1909). The Fourth Olympiad London 1908 Official Report (PDF). London: British Olympic Association. Archived from the original (PDF) on 2008-05-28.
- ITF, 2008 Olympic Tennis Event Media Guide
