= Kathlene Fernström =

Swedish footballer

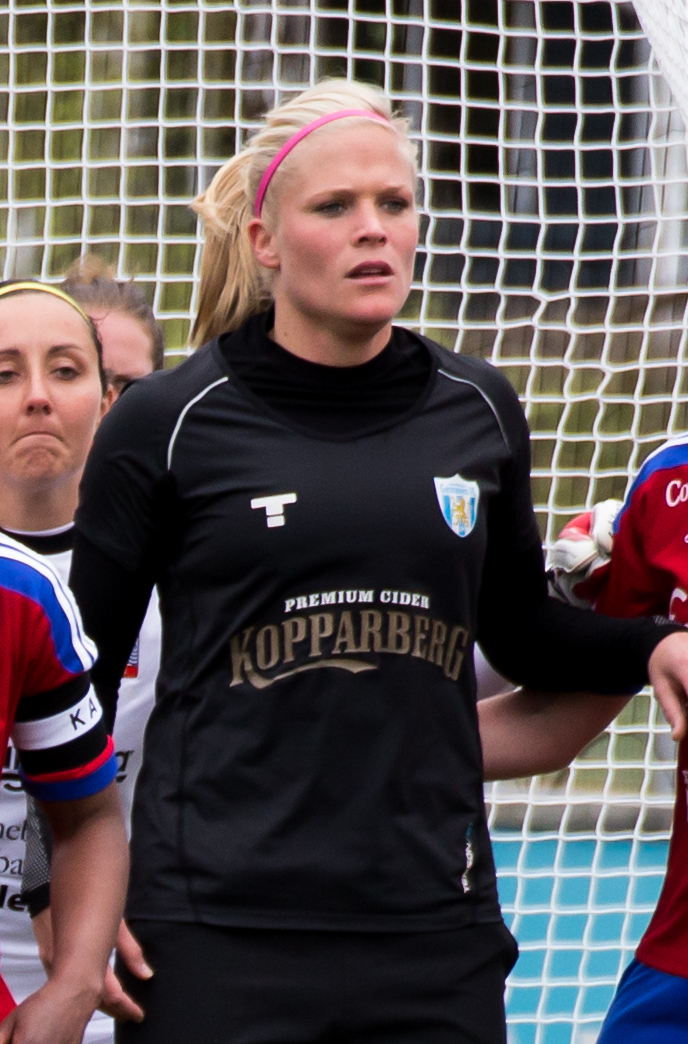

Personal information
- Date of birth: 26 August 1986 (age 40)
- Place of birth: Sweden
- Position: Defender

Senior career*
Years	Team	Apps	(Gls)
2010–2013	Jitex BK	76	(3)
2014–2016	Kopparbergs/Göteborg FC	28	(1)
- * Club domestic league appearances and goals

Kathlene Fernström (born 26 August 1986) is a Swedish footballer who played in the fully professional Damallsvenskan, a Swedish women league, as a defender. Fernström played for Jitex BK from 2010 to 2013, where she scored three goals in 78 appearances. Fernström now plays for Kopparbergs/Göteborg FC and has, as of 25 October 2014, played 19 games, in which, she hasn't scored.
