= Carl-Johan Lindqvist =

Swedish luger (born 1971)

Carl-Johan Alexander Lindqvist (born November 15, 1971, in Tyresö) is a Swedish luger who competed in the early 1990s. Competing in two Winter Olympics, he earned his best finish of sixth in the men's doubles at Albertville in 1992.

As of 2007, Lindqvist is the director of information technology for the Swedish Bobsleigh, Luge, and Skeleton Federation.
