= Alice Greene =

English tennis player

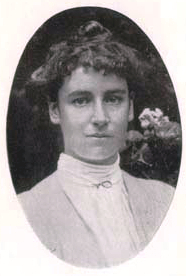
- Greene (before 1910)
- Country (sports): United Kingdom
- Born: 15 October 1879 Upton, Northamptonshire, England
- Died: 26 October 1956 (aged 77) Saint Brélade, Jersey

Singles

Grand Slam singles results
- Wimbledon: SF (1903, 1904
Medal record
Women's Tennis
Silver medal – second place	1908 London	Indoor singles

Alice Norah Gertrude Greene (15 October 1879 – 26 October 1956) was a female English tennis player from the United Kingdom. She won a silver medal playing tennis at the 1908 Summer Olympics in London. Sometimes referred to as Angela Greene in some references.

== Early life ==
Greene was born at Upton, Northamptonshire on 15 October 1879, the daughter of Richard and Emma Greene. Her father, Richard, was a medical doctor and superintendent of the Northampton County Lunatic Asylum in Upton.

== Tennis ==
At the October 1907 London Covered Courts Championships at the Queen's Club, Greene won the Ladies Single's title. Greene played at the 1908 Summer Olympics in London and won a silver medal in the women's indoor singles event. Greene also placed fifth in the outdoor singles event. Greene was also an international field hockey player.

== Later life ==
Greene moved to the island of Jersey, where she died on 26 October 1956.

In 2010 her Olympic medals were auctioned.
