= Sailing at the 1920 Summer Olympics – 30 m2 Skerry cruiser =

30 m^{2} Skerry cruiser at the Games of the VII Olympiad
- Line drawings of the 30 m^{2} Skerry cruiser (1920)
- Venue: Belgium, Ostend
- Dates: First race: 7 July 1920; Last race: 9 July 1920
- Competitors: 3 from 1 nation
- Teams: 1

Medalists
1st place, gold medalist(s)		Gösta Lundqvist, Gösta Bengtsson, Rolf Steffenburg	Sweden

The 30 m^{2} Skerry Cruiser was a sailing event on the Sailing at the 1920 Summer Olympics program in Ostend. Four races were scheduled in each type. In total 3 sailors, on 1 boats, from 1 nation entered in the 30 m^{2} Skerry cruiser.

== Race schedule ==
●	Opening ceremony	●	Event competitions	●	Event finals	●	Closing ceremony

Date	July			
Date	7th Wed	8th Thu	9th Fri	10th Sat
30 m^{2} Skerry cruiser	●	●	●	●
Total gold medals				1

== Course area ==
30m^{2} Skerry cruiser 1920 Olympic Course Areas

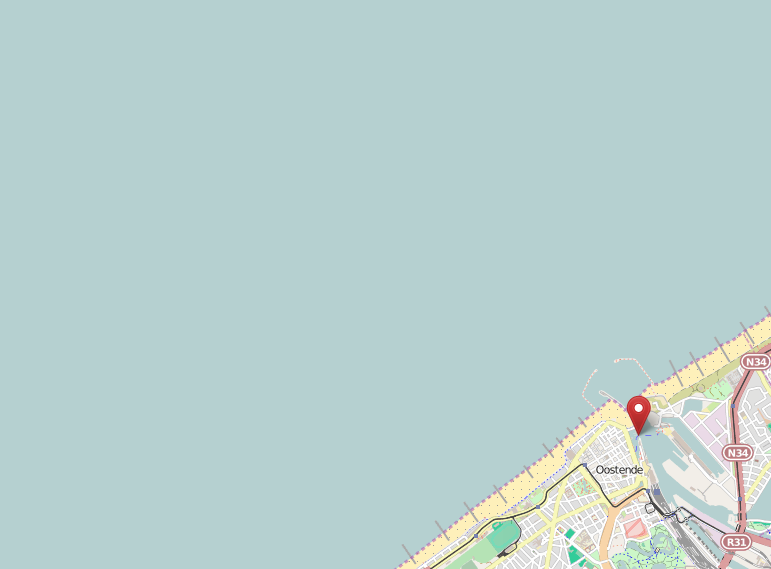
Ostend, Belgium

== Weather conditions ==
Date	Max temperature	Wind speed	Average wind direction
7 July 1920	Unknown		
8 July 1920	Unknown		
9 July 1920	Unknown		

== Final results ==
The 1920 Olympic scoring system was used.

Rank	Country	Helmsman	Crew	Boat	Race 1		Race 2		Total
Rank	Country	Helmsman	Crew	Boat	Pos.	Pts.	Pos.	Pts.	Total
1st place, gold medalist(s)	Sweden	Gösta Lundquist	Gösta Bengtsson; Rolf Steffenburg	Kullan	Sailover	1	Sailover	1	2

== Notes ==
- Since the official documentation of the 1920 Summer Olympics was written in 1957 many facts did disappear in time.

== Other information ==
=== Sailors ===
During the Sailing regattas at the 1920 Summer Olympics the following persons were competing:

30 m^{2} Skerry cruiser sailors at the 1920 Olympic Games
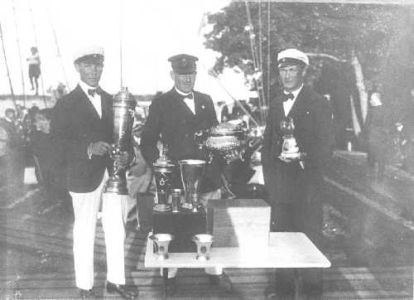
Crew of 30 m^{2} Skerry cruiser KULLAN (SWE)
