= George Caridia =

British tennis player

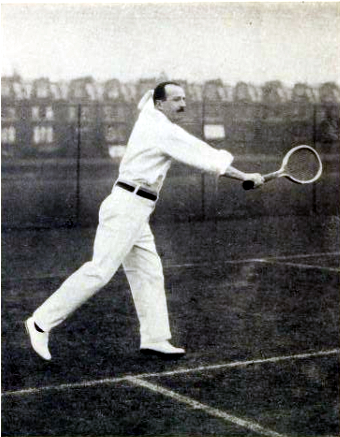
- George Aristides Caridia, English tennis player, making a backhand (before 1908)
- Full name: George Aristides Caridia
- Country (sports): Great Britain
- Born: 20 February 1869 Calcutta, British India
- Died: 21 April 1937 (aged 68) London, England

Singles
- Career record: 126-60 (67.7%)
- Career titles: 12

Grand Slam singles results
- Wimbledon: SF (1903)

Other tournaments
- WHCC: 1R (1912)

Grand Slam doubles results
- Wimbledon: F (1904)
Medal record
Olympic Games – Tennis
Silver medal – second place	1908 London	Indoor singles
Silver medal – second place	1908 London	Indoor doubles

George Aristides Caridia (Greek: Γεώργιος Αριστείδης Καρυδιάς; 20 February 1869 – 21 April 1937) was a British male tennis player and a two-time Olympic silver medalist.

== Career ==
At the 1908 London Olympics, Caridia won those medals in the men's singles and doubles (with George Simond) event (both were contested indoor). In both finals he lost to fellow British player Arthur Gore. Caridia reached the singles semifinals of Wimbledon in 1903 (losing in four sets to Major Ritchie) and the quarterfinals in 1904 and 1909.

Caridia was reportedly best on covered courts, which suited his strong half-volley; he won the Welsh Covered Court Championships nine times between 1899 and 1909, playing at Craigside, Llandudno, Wales for 20 consecutive years. In 1900, he won the French Covered Court Championships in Paris against Harold Mahony. In addition, he was a finalist at the London Covered Court Championships (1906), losing to Tony Wilding, and an all-comers finalist at the British Covered Court Championships (1905), losing to Major Ritchie.

Caridia later became a committee member of the Wimbledon Lawn Tennis Association. He died in 1937 and was buried at West Norwood Cemetery.
