= Gösta Lundquist =

Swedish sailor

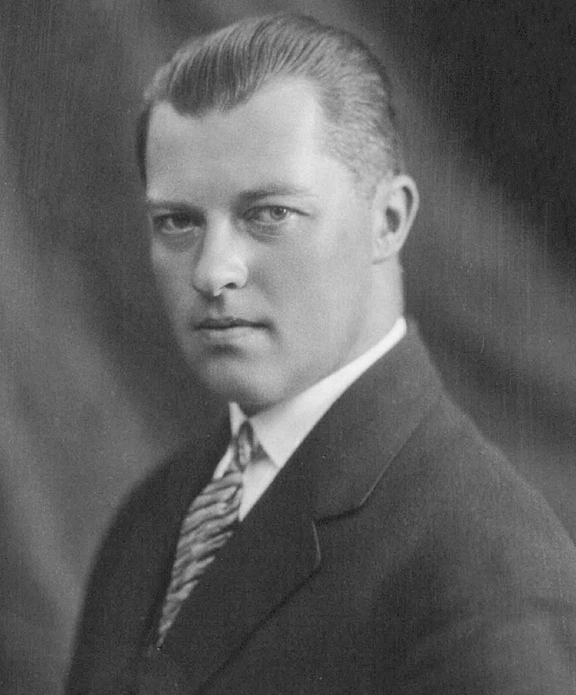

Personal information
- Nationality: Swedish
- Born: 15 August 1892 Gothenburg, Sweden
- Died: 10 October 1944 (aged 52) Gothenburg, Sweden

Sailing career
- Sport: Sailing
- Club: Kullaviks KKK
- Class: 30m² Skerry cruiser
Medal record
Sailing
Representing Sweden
Olympic Games
Gold medal – first place	1920 Antwerp	30m² Skerry cruiser

Gösta Lundquist (15 August 1892 – 10 October 1944) was a Swedish sailor. He was a crew member of the Swedish boat Kullan that won the gold medal in the 30 m^{2} class at the 1920 Summer Olympics.
