= Hans Kohala =

Swedish luger (born 1966)

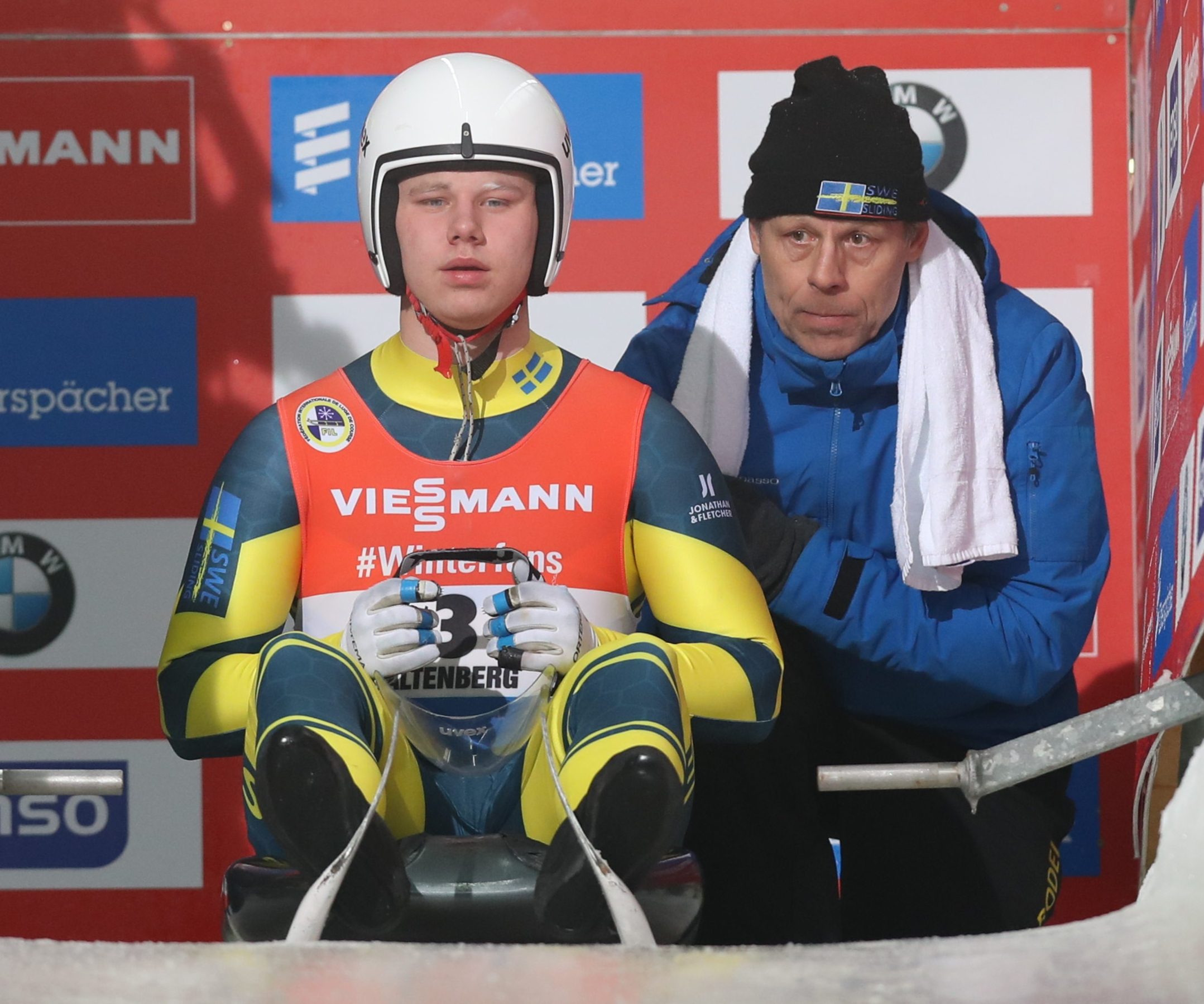
- Kohala (right) is preparing his son Svante at the start of the 2019 Altenberg World Cup.

Personal information
- Born: 3 June 1966 (age 58); Nacka, Sweden

Sport
- Country: Sweden
- Sport: Luge

Hans Kohala (born 3 June 1966 in Nacka) is a Swedish luger who competed in the early 1990s. Competing in two Winter Olympics, he earned his best finish of sixth in the men's doubles at Albertville in 1992.

Kohala is president of the Swedish Luge Association.

His children Svante and Tove are members of the Swedish luge national team.
