= Märtha Adlerstråhle =

Swedish tennis player

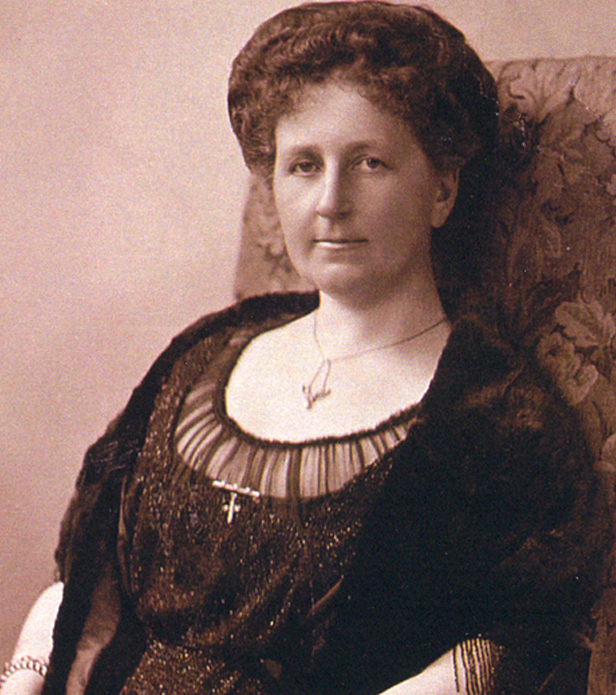

Personal information
- Born: 16 June 1868 Torpa, Sweden
- Died: 4 January 1956 (aged 87) Stockholm, Sweden

Sport
- Sport: Tennis
- Club: KLTK, Stockholm
Medal record
Representing Sweden
Olympic Games
Bronze medal – third place	1908 London	Indoor singles

Anna Märtha Vilhelmina Adlerstråhle (16 June 1868 – 4 January 1956) was a Swedish tennis player. Aged 40, she won a bronze medal in the indoor singles competition at the 1908 Summer Olympics. She was the first woman to represent Sweden at the Olympics.
