= Wollmar Boström =

Swedish tennis player (1878–1956)

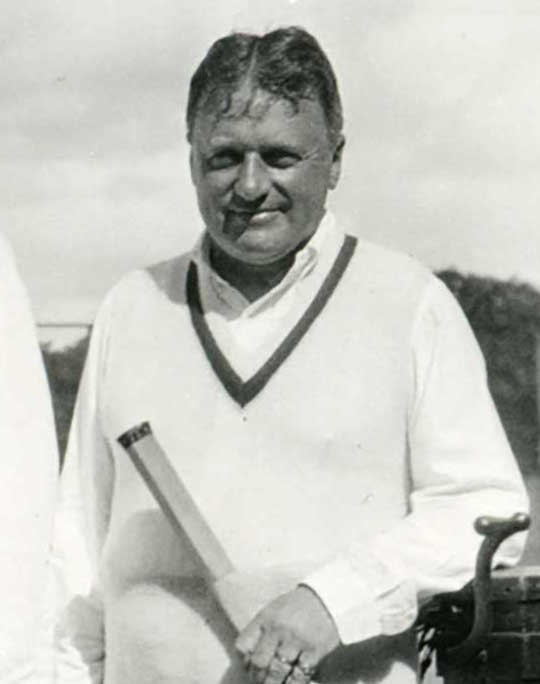
- Born: 15 June 1878 Överselö, Sweden
- Died: 7 November 1956 (aged 78) Stockholm, Sweden

Grand Slam singles results
- Wimbledon: 2R (1905)

Other tournaments
- WCCC: 1R (1913)
- Olympic Games: QF (1908^{In})

Other doubles tournaments
- Olympic Games: Bronze Medal (1908^{In})
Medal record
Representing Sweden
Men's Tennis
Olympic Games
Bronze medal – third place	1908 London	Indoor doubles

Wollmar Filip Boström (15 June 1878 – 7 November 1956) was a Swedish diplomat and tennis player. He competed at the 1908 and 1912 Olympics in singles and men's doubles and won a bronze medal in the doubles in 1908, finishing fifth in three other events.

He was the son of Governor of Södermanland County Filip Boström and nephew to Prime Minister Erik Gustaf Boström. In 1903, he started working at the Swedish Ministry of Foreign Affairs. In 1909–13, he served as president of the Swedish Tennis Association, and in 1918–22, he was a cabinet secretary. From 1925 till 1945, he was the Swedish minister in Washington.

Government offices
Preceded by Oskar Ewerlöf	State Secretary for Foreign Affairs; 1918–1922	Succeeded by Erik Sjöborg
Diplomatic posts
Preceded by Ivan Danielsson	Envoy of Sweden to Spain; 1922–1925	Succeeded by Ivan Danielsson
Preceded by Ivan Danielsson	Envoy of Sweden to Portugal; 1922–1925	Succeeded by Ivan Danielsson
Preceded by Axel Wallenberg	Envoy of Sweden to the United States; 1925–1945	Succeeded by Herman Eriksson
