= Felix Fernström =

Swedish bobsledder (1916–1991)

Felix Konrad Fernström (August 31, 1916 – March 11, 1991) was a Swedish bobsledder who competed in the early 1950s. At the 1952 Winter Olympics in Oslo, he finished sixth in the four-man event.
