= List of Olympic medalists in modern pentathlon =

This is the complete list of Olympic medalists in modern pentathlon.

== Current program ==
=== Men's individual ===
Games	Gold	Silver	Bronze
1912 Stockholm	Gösta Lilliehöök; Sweden	Gösta Åsbrink; Sweden	Georg de Laval; Sweden
1920 Antwerp	Gustaf Dyrssen; Sweden	Erik de Laval; Sweden	Gösta Runö; Sweden
1924 Paris	Bo Lindman; Sweden	Gustaf Dyrssen; Sweden	Bertil Uggla; Sweden
1928 Amsterdam	Sven Thofelt; Sweden	Bo Lindman; Sweden	Helmut Kahl; Germany
1932 Los Angeles	Johan Oxenstierna; Sweden	Bo Lindman; Sweden	Richard Mayo; United States
1936 Berlin	Gotthard Handrick; Germany	Charles Leonard; United States	Silvano Abbà; Italy
1948 London	William Grut; Sweden	George Moore; United States	Gösta Gärdin; Sweden
1952 Helsinki	Lars Hall; Sweden	Gábor Benedek; Hungary	István Szondy; Hungary
1956 Melbourne	Lars Hall; Sweden	Olavi Mannonen; Finland	Wäinö Korhonen; Finland
1960 Rome	Ferenc Németh; Hungary	Imre Nagy; Hungary	Robert Beck; United States
1964 Tokyo	Ferenc Török; Hungary	Igor Novikov; Soviet Union	Albert Mokeyev; Soviet Union
1968 Mexico City	Björn Ferm; Sweden	András Balczó; Hungary	Pavel Lednyov; Soviet Union
1972 Munich	András Balczó; Hungary	Boris Onishchenko; Soviet Union	Pavel Lednyov; Soviet Union
1976 Montreal	Janusz Pyciak-Peciak; Poland	Pavel Lednyov; Soviet Union	Jan Bártů; Czechoslovakia
1980 Moscow	Anatoli Starostin; Soviet Union	Tamás Szombathelyi; Hungary	Pavel Lednyov; Soviet Union
1984 Los Angeles	Daniele Masala; Italy	Svante Rasmuson; Sweden	Carlo Massullo; Italy
1988 Seoul	János Martinek; Hungary	Carlo Massullo; Italy	Vakhtang Iagorashvili; Soviet Union
1992 Barcelona	Arkadiusz Skrzypaszek; Poland	Attila Mizsér; Hungary	Eduard Zenovka; Unified Team
1996 Atlanta	Alexander Parygin; Kazakhstan	Eduard Zenovka; Russia	János Martinek; Hungary
2000 Sydney	Dmitri Svatkovskiy; Russia	Gábor Balogh; Hungary	Pavel Dovgal; Belarus
2004 Athens	Andrey Moiseyev; Russia	Andrejus Zadneprovskis; Lithuania	Libor Capalini; Czech Republic
2008 Beijing	Andrey Moiseyev; Russia	Edvinas Krungolcas; Lithuania	Andrejus Zadneprovskis; Lithuania
2012 London	David Svoboda; Czech Republic	Cao Zhongrong; China	Ádám Marosi; Hungary
2016 Rio de Janeiro	Aleksander Lesun; Russia	Pavlo Tymoshchenko; Ukraine	Ismael Hernandez; Mexico
2020 Tokyo	Joe Choong; Great Britain	Ahmed El-Gendy; Egypt	Jun Woong-Tae; South Korea
2024 Paris	Ahmed El-Gendy; Egypt	Taishu Sato; Japan	Giorgio Malan; Italy
2028 Los Angeles			

=== Women's individual ===
Games	Gold	Silver	Bronze
2000 Sydney	Stephanie Cook; Great Britain	Emily deRiel; United States	Kate Allenby; Great Britain
2004 Athens	Zsuzsanna Vörös; Hungary	Jeļena Rubļevska; Latvia	Georgina Harland; Great Britain
2008 Beijing	Lena Schöneborn; Germany	Heather Fell; Great Britain	Anastasiya Samusevich; Belarus
2012 London	Laura Asadauskaitė; Lithuania	Samantha Murray; Great Britain	Yane Marques; Brazil
2016 Rio de Janeiro	Chloe Esposito; Australia	Élodie Clouvel; France	Oktawia Nowacka; Poland
2020 Tokyo	Kate French; Great Britain	Laura Asadauskaitė; Lithuania	Sarolta Kovács; Hungary
2024 Paris	Michelle Gulyás; Hungary	Élodie Clouvel; France	Seong Seung-min; South Korea
2028 Los Angeles			

== Discontinued event ==
=== Men's team ===
Games	Gold	Silver	Bronze
1952 Helsinki	Hungary; Gábor Benedek; Aladár Kovácsi; István Szondy	Sweden; Lars Hall; Thorsten Lindqvist; Claes Egnell	Finland; Olavi Mannonen; Lauri Vilkko; Olavi Rokka
1956 Melbourne	Soviet Union; Igor Novikov; Aleksandr Tarasov; Ivan Deryugin	United States; George Lambert; William Andre; Jack Daniels	Finland; Olavi Mannonen; Wäinö Korhonen; Berndt Katter
1960 Rome	Hungary; Ferenc Németh; Imre Nagy; András Balczó	Soviet Union; Igor Novikov; Nikolay Tatarinov; Hanno Selg	United States; Robert Beck; George Lambert; Jack Daniels
1964 Tokyo	Soviet Union; Igor Novikov; Albert Mokeyev; Viktor Mineyev	United States; James Moore; David Kirkwood; Paul Pesthy	Hungary; Ferenc Török; Imre Nagy; Ottó Török
1968 Mexico City	Hungary; András Balczó; István Móna; Ferenc Török	Soviet Union; Boris Onishchenko; Pavel Lednyov; Stasys Šaparnis	France; Raoul Gueguen; Lucien Guiguet; Jean-Pierre Giudicelli
1972 Munich	Soviet Union; Boris Onishchenko; Pavel Lednyov; Vladimir Shmelyov	Hungary; András Balczó; Zsigmond Villányi; Pál Bakó	Finland; Risto Hurme; Veikko Salminen; Martti Ketelä
1976 Montreal	Great Britain; Jim Fox; Danny Nightingale; Adrian Parker	Czechoslovakia; Jan Bártů; Bohumil Starnovský; Jiří Adam	Hungary; Tamás Kancsal; Tibor Maracskó; Szvetiszláv Sasics
1980 Moscow	Soviet Union; Anatoli Starostin; Pavel Lednyov; Yevgeny Lipeyev	Hungary; Tamás Szombathelyi; Tibor Maracskó; László Horváth	Sweden; Svante Rasmuson; Lennart Pettersson; George Horvath
1984 Los Angeles	Italy; Daniele Masala; Pier Paolo Cristofori; Carlo Massullo	United States; Michael Storm; Robert Gregory Losey; Dean Glenesk	France; Paul Four; Didier Boube; Joël Bouzou
1988 Seoul	Hungary; János Martinek; Attila Mizsér; László Fábián	Italy; Carlo Massullo; Daniele Masala; Gianluca Tiberti	Great Britain; Richard Phelps; Dominic Mahony; Graham Brookhouse
1992 Barcelona	Poland; Arkadiusz Skrzypaszek; Dariusz Goździak; Maciej Czyżowicz	Unified Team; Anatoli Starostin; Dmitri Svatkovskiy; Eduard Zenovka	Italy; Gianluca Tiberti; Carlo Massullo; Roberto Bomprezzi

== Athletes ==
The following table shows the most successful athletes in Olympic modern pentathlon by medals won:

Rank	Nation	Gold	Silver	Bronze	Total
1	András Balczó (HUN)	3	2	0	5
2	Pavel Lednyov (URS)	2	2	3	7
3	Igor Novikov (URS)	2	2	0	4
4	Daniele Masala (ITA)	2	1	0	3
4	Lars Hall (SWE)	2	1	0	3
4	Anatoli Starostin (URS)	2	1	0	3
7	János Martinek (HUN)	2	0	1	3
7	Ferenc Török (HUN)	2	0	1	3
9	Ferenc Németh (HUN)	2	0	0	2
9	Arkadiusz Skrzypaszek (POL)	2	0	0	2
9	Andrey Moiseyev (RUS)	2	0	0	2
