= Modern pentathlon at the 1976 Summer Olympics – Men's individual =

Men's individual modern pentathlon at the Games of the XXI Olympiad
- Dates: July 18–22
- Competitors: 47 from 17 nations

Medalists
1st place, gold medalist(s)		Janusz Pyciak-Peciak	Poland
2nd place, silver medalist(s)		Pavel Lednev	Soviet Union
3rd place, bronze medalist(s)		Jan Bartu	Czechoslovakia

The modern pentathlon at the 1976 Summer Olympics was represented by two events (both for men): Individual competition and Team competition. As usual in Olympic modern pentathlon, one competition was held and each competitor's score was included to the Individual competition event results table and was also added to his teammates' scores to be included to the Team competition event results table. This competition consisted of 5 disciplines:

- Equestrian, held on July 18 at Bromont.
- Fencing, held on July 19 at Université de Montréal.
- Shooting, held on July 20 at L'Acadie.
- Swimming, held on July 21 at Olympic Pool.
- Cross-country, held on July 22 at Olympic Stadium and Maisonneuve Park.

== Results ==
Rank	Athlete	Rid.	Fen.	Sho.	Swi.	Run.	Score
1st place, gold medalist(s)	Janusz Pyciak-Peciak (POL)	1066	928	1044	1164	1318	5520
2nd place, silver medalist(s)	Pavel Lednev (URS)	1032	1096	1022	1092	1243	5485
3rd place, bronze medalist(s)	Jan Bartu (TCH)	1100	976	1044	1184	1162	5466
4	Daniele Masala (ITA)	1090	832	1066	1244	1201	5433
5	Adrian Parker (GBR)	1100	712	868	1240	1378	5298
6	John Fitzgerald (USA)	1036	952	1000	1232	1066	5286
7	Jørn Steffensen (DEN)	1100	856	1044	1068	1213	5281
8	Boris Mosolov (URS)	1036	856	934	1212	1162	5200
9	Tamas Kancsal (HUN)	866	990	956	1164	1219	5195
10	Danny Nightingale (GBR)	1012	760	934	1172	1309	5187
11	Risto Hurme (FIN)	1100	856	868	1088	1246	5158
12	Alain Cortes (FRA)	1036	784	956	1108	1249	5133
13	Tibor Maracsko (HUN)	972	832	890	1204	1228	5126
14	Walter Esser (FRG)	1100	784	978	1112	1120	5094
15	Jim Fox (GBR)	1100	784	846	1080	1264	5074
16	Michael Burley (USA)	1068	760	692	1212	1327	5059
17	Bohumil Starnovský (TCH)	1068	832	868	1144	1144	5056
18	Szvetiszlav Sasics (HUN)	934	928	912	1160	1117	5051
19	Zbigniew Pacelt (POL)	1100	592	890	1308	1138	5028
20	Hans Lager (SWE)	1100	688	758	1244	1225	5015
21	Stoyan Zlatev (BUL)	1036	784	1000	1140	1048	5008
22	Velko Bratanov (BUL)	1064	808	1000	980	1147	4999
23	Jussi Pelli (FIN)	1004	760	956	1020	1192	4932
24	Bengt Lager (SWE)	1068	688	802	1120	1252	4930
25	Pier Paolo Cristofori (ITA)	1100	712	780	1128	1207	4927
26	Robert Nieman (USA)	1036	784	604	1324	1153	4901
27	Klaus Petersen (DEN)	1036	712	890	1120	1120	4878
28	Claude Guiguet (FRA)	1100	712	1000	924	1123	4859
29	Jiri Adam (TCH)	794	904	1088	1072	1000	4858
30	Gerhard Werner (FRG)	972	736	824	1196	1129	4857
31	Shoji Uchida (JPN)	1068	736	692	1084	1270	4850
32	Gunnar Jacobson (SWE)	1100	784	780	1104	1075	4843
33	Michel Gueguen (FRA)	1100	712	714	1104	1195	4825
34	Krzyszto Trybusiewicz (POL)	1004	640	978	1072	1129	4823
35	Heikki Hulkkonen (FIN)	690	880	978	1120	1141	4809
36	Nikolai Nikolov (BUL)	956	664	934	1068	1102	4724
37	Akira Kubo (JPN)	1036	832	802	904	1126	4700
38	Serge Bindy (SUI)	660	760	912	1148	1183	4663
39	Mario Medda (ITA)	1004	688	824	1056	1075	4647
40	Hiroyuki Kawazoe (JPN)	1068	688	956	840	1039	4591
41	Wolfgang Köpcke (FRG)	940	592	824	1084	1111	4551
42	Peter Ridgway (AUS)	1068	640	912	1020	910	4550
43	John Hawes (CAN)	1068	856	230	1272	1108	4534
44	Peter Macken (AUS)	1068	544	802	752	1186	4352
45	George Skene (CAN)	1100	520	274	1176	1102	4172
46	Jack Alexander (CAN)	478	472	692	1268	1213	4123

Boris Onischenko (URS) was ejected from the competition during the fencing event after it was discovered he had wired his epée with a concealed push button circuit breaker that enabled him to register a hit at any time. Onischenko's results were deleted from the records, and he was spirited away from the Olympic Village almost immediately, never competing in events outside the USSR again.
