= Modern pentathlon at the 1976 Summer Olympics – Men's team =

Men's team modern pentathlon at the Games of the XXI Olympiad
- Dates: July 18–22
- Competitors: 42 from 14 nations

Medalists
1st place, gold medalist(s)		Jim Fox; Danny Nightingale; Adrian Parker	Great Britain
2nd place, silver medalist(s)		Jiri Adam; Jan Bartu; Bohumil Starnovský	Czechoslovakia
3rd place, bronze medalist(s)		Tamas Kancsal; Tibor Maracsko; Szvetiszlav Sasics	Hungary

The modern pentathlon at the 1976 Summer Olympics was represented by two events (both for men): Individual competition and Team competition. As usual in Olympic modern pentathlon, one competition was held and each competitor's score was included to the Individual competition event results table and was also added to his teammates' scores to be included to the Team competition event results table. This competition consisted of 5 disciplines:

- Equestrian, held on July 18 at Bromont.
- Fencing, held on July 19 at Université de Montréal.
- Shooting, held on July 20 at L'Acadie.
- Swimming, held on July 21 at Olympic Pool.
- Cross-country, held on July 22 at Olympic Stadium and Maisonneuve Park.

== Results ==
Rank	Nation	Athlete	Rid.	Fen.	Sho.	Swi.	Run.	Score	Team Score
1st place, gold medalist(s)	Great Britain	Adrian Parker	1100	752	868	1240	1378	5338	15559
1st place, gold medalist(s)	Great Britain	Danny Nightingale	1012	814	934	1172	1309	5241	15559
1st place, gold medalist(s)	Great Britain	Jim Fox	1100	690	846	1080	1264	4980	15559
2nd place, silver medalist(s)	Czechoslovakia	Jan Bartu	1100	969	1044	1184	1162	5459	15451
2nd place, silver medalist(s)	Czechoslovakia	Bohumil Starnovský	1068	876	868	1144	1144	5100	15451
2nd place, silver medalist(s)	Czechoslovakia	Jiri Adam	794	938	1088	1072	1000	4892	15451
3rd place, bronze medalist(s)	Hungary	Tamas Kancsal	866	990	956	1164	1219	5195	15395
3rd place, bronze medalist(s)	Hungary	Tibor Maracsko	972	845	890	1204	1228	5139	15395
3rd place, bronze medalist(s)	Hungary	Szvetiszlav Sasics	934	938	912	1160	1117	5061	15395
4	Poland	Janusz Pyciak-Peciak	1066	969	1044	1164	1318	5561	15343
4	Poland	Zbigniew Pacelt	1100	535	890	1308	1138	4971	15343
4	Poland	Krzysztof Trybusiewicz	1004	628	978	1072	1129	4811	15343
5	United States	John Fitzgerald	1036	969	1000	1232	1066	5303	15285
5	United States	Michael Burley	1068	752	692	1212	1327	5051	15285
5	United States	Robert Nieman	1036	814	604	1324	1153	4931	15285
6	Italy	Daniele Masala	1090	907	1066	1244	1201	5508	15031
6	Italy	Pier Paolo Cristofori	1100	721	780	1128	1207	4936	15031
6	Italy	Mario Medda	1004	628	824	1056	1075	4587	15031
7	Finland	Risto Hurme	1100	907	868	1088	1246	5209	15000
7	Finland	Jussi Pelli	1004	752	956	1020	1192	4924	15000
7	Finland	Heikki Hulkkonen	690	938	978	1120	1141	4867	15000
8	Sweden	Hans Lager	1100	721	758	1244	1225	5048	14946
8	Sweden	Bengt Lager	1068	721	802	1120	1252	4963	14946
8	Sweden	Gunnar Jacobson	1100	876	780	1104	1075	4935	14946
9	France	Alain Cortes	1036	814	956	1108	1249	5163	14834
9	France	Claude Guiguet	1100	721	1000	924	1123	4868	14834
9	France	Michel Gueguen	1100	690	714	1104	1195	4803	14834
10	Bulgaria	Velko Bratanov	1064	876	1000	980	1147	5067	14824
10	Bulgaria	Stoyan Zlatev	1036	814	1000	1140	1048	5038	14824
10	Bulgaria	Nikolai Nikolov	956	659	934	1068	1102	4719	14824
11	West Germany	Walter Esser	1100	783	978	1112	1120	5093	14429
11	West Germany	Gerhard Werner	972	690	824	1196	1129	4811	14429
11	West Germany	Wolfgang Köpcke	940	566	824	1084	1111	4525	14429
12	Japan	Shoji Uchida	1068	814	692	1084	1270	4928	14234
12	Japan	Akira Kubo	1036	814	802	904	1126	4682	14234
12	Japan	Hiroyuki Kawazoe	1068	721	956	840	1039	4624	14234
13	Canada	John Hawes	1068	845	230	1272	1108	4523	12772
13	Canada	George Skene	1100	504	274	1176	1102	4156	12772
13	Canada	Jack Alexander	478	442	692	1268	1213	4093	12772

The Soviet Union were forced to scratch from the competition after team member Boris Onischenko was ejected from the competition during the fencing event after it was discovered he had wired his épée with a concealed push button circuit breaker that enabled him to register a hit at any time.

The other Soviet team members, Pavel Lednev and Boris Mosolov, were allowed to continue individually, but since three athletes are required to compete in a team event, it was ruled their results would receive no score in the team competition.
