= 1975 World Modern Pentathlon Championships =

The 1975 World Modern Pentathlon Championships were held in Mexico City, Mexico.

== Medal summary ==
=== Men's events ===
Event	(gold) Gold	(silver) Silver	(bronze) Bronze
Individual	Pavel Lednev (URS)	Tamás Kancsal (HUN)	Jeremy Fox (GBR)
Team	Hungary; Tamás Kancsal; Svetiszlav Sasics; Tibor Maracskó	United States; John Fitzgerald; Michael Burley; Orben Greenwald	Soviet Union; Pavel Lednev; Vladimir Shmelyov; Leonid Ivanov

== Medal table ==
Rank	Nation	Gold	Silver	Bronze	Total
1	Hungary (HUN)	1	1	0	2
2	Soviet Union (URS)	1	0	1	2
3	United States (USA)	0	1	0	1
4	Great Britain (GBR)	0	0	1	1
Totals (4 entries)		2	2	2	6

== See also ==
- World Modern Pentathlon Championship
