= 1977 World Modern Pentathlon Championships =

The 1977 World Modern Pentathlon Championships were held in San Antonio, United States.

== Medal summary ==
=== Men's events ===
Event	(gold) Gold	(silver) Silver	(bronze) Bronze
Individual	Janusz Pyciak-Peciak (POL)	Pavel Lednev (URS)	Slawomir Rotkiewicz (POL)
Team	Poland; Janusz Pyciak-Peciak; Slawomir Rotkiewicz; Zbigniew Pacelt	Soviet Union; Pavel Lednev; Sergey Ryabikin; Aleksandr Tarev	Hungary; Pál Bakó; Tibor Maracskó; László Horváth

== Medal table ==
Rank	Nation	Gold	Silver	Bronze	Total
1	Poland (POL)	2	0	1	3
2	Soviet Union (URS)	0	2	0	2
3	Hungary (HUN)	0	0	1	1
Totals (3 entries)		2	2	2	6

== See also ==
- World Modern Pentathlon Championship
