= 1973 World Modern Pentathlon Championships =

The 1973 World Modern Pentathlon Championships were held in London, Great Britain.

== Medal summary ==
=== Men's events ===
Event	(gold) Gold	(silver) Silver	(bronze) Bronze
Individual	Pavel Lednev (URS)	Vladimir Shmelyov (URS)	Boris Onishchenko (URS)
Team	Soviet Union; Pavel Lednev; Vladimir Shmelyov; Boris Onishchenko	West Germany; Wolfgang Köpcke; Heiner Thade; Gerhard Werner	Hungary; László Horváth; Peter Kelemen; Tibor Maracskó

== Medal table ==
Rank	Nation	Gold	Silver	Bronze	Total
1	Soviet Union (URS)	2	1	1	4
2	West Germany (FRG)	0	1	0	1
3	Hungary (HUN)	0	0	1	1
Totals (3 entries)		2	2	2	6

== See also ==
- World Modern Pentathlon Championship
