= 1974 World Modern Pentathlon Championships =

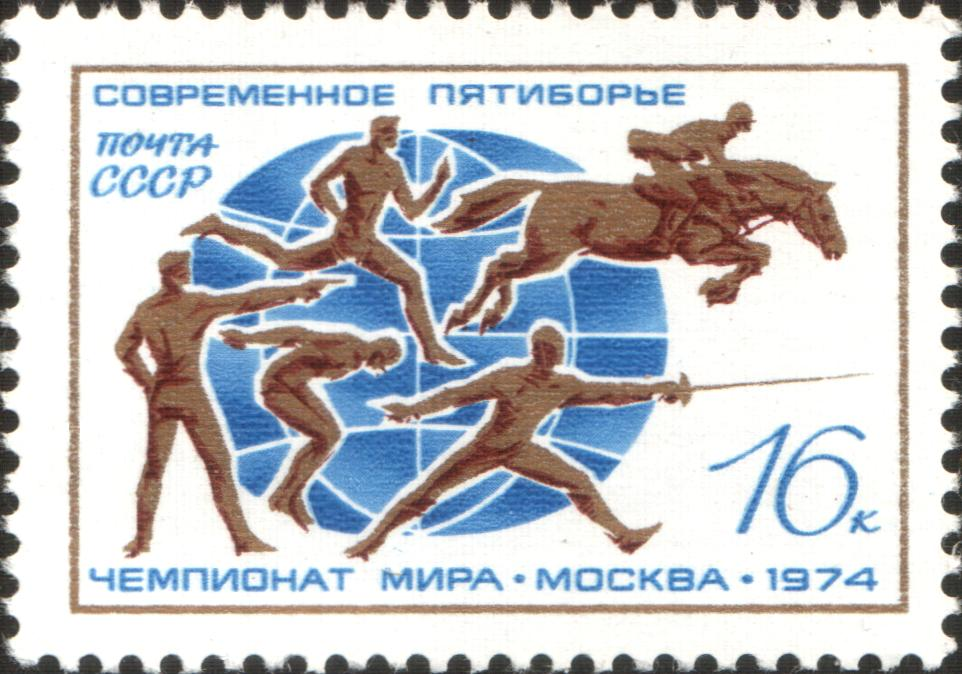
A Soviet stamp dedicated to the 974 World Modern Pentathlon Championships

The 1974 World Modern Pentathlon Championships were held in Moscow, Soviet Union.

== Medal summary ==
=== Men's events ===
Event	(gold) Gold	(silver) Silver	(bronze) Bronze
Individual	Pavel Lednev (URS)	Vladimir Shmelyov (URS)	Boris Onishchenko (URS)
Team	Soviet Union; Pavel Lednev; Vladimir Shmelyov; Boris Onishchenko	Hungary; Tamás Kancsal; Tibor Maracskó; Zsigmond Villányi	Romania; Dumitru Spirlea; Constantin Calina; Adalbert Covacs

== Medal table ==
* Host nation (Soviet Union)

Rank	Nation	Gold	Silver	Bronze	Total
1	Soviet Union (URS)*	2	1	1	4
2	Hungary (HUN)	0	1	0	1
3	Romania (ROU)	0	0	1	1
Totals (3 entries)		2	2	2	6

== See also ==
- World Modern Pentathlon Championship
