= List of Olympic venues for equestrian events =

Fifty-three venues have been used for equestrian events at the Olympic Games. From 1912 to 1992, the events took place in more than one venue. Since the 1992 Summer Olympics, the equestrian events have taken place on a single venue in an effort to reduce costs. During the 1964 to the 1980 Summer Olympics, an equestrian event was the final event before the closing ceremonies of the respective Olympics. The last equestrian event that took place at the main stadium was at the 1988 Summer Olympics though it was not the final event before the closing ceremonies. That honor would fall for the end of the men's marathon event. Stockholm Olympic Stadium is the only equestrian venue to serve host for more than one Summer Olympics, doing so in 1912 and 1956.

Games	Venue	Other sports hosted at venue for those games	Capacity	Ref.
1900 Paris	7th arrondissement of Paris	None	Not listed	
1912 Stockholm	Fältrittklubben (eventing endurance)	None	Not listed.	
1912 Stockholm	Liljeholmen	Cycling	Not listed.	
1912 Stockholm	Lindarängen (eventing steeplechase)	None	Not listed.	
1912 Stockholm	Östermalm Athletic Grounds	Fencing, Modern pentathlon (fencing), Tennis	Not listed.	
1912 Stockholm	Stockholm Olympic Stadium	Athletics, Football (final), Gymnastics, Modern pentathlon (running), Tug of war, Wrestling	33,000.	
1920 Antwerp	Olympisch Stadion	Athletics, Field hockey, Football (final), Gymnastics, Modern pentathlon, Rugby union, Tug of war, Weightlifting	12,771	
1924 Paris	Hippodrome d'Auteuil	None	8,922	
1924 Paris	Stade de Colombes	Athletics, Cycling (road), Fencing, Football (final), Gymnastics, Modern pentathlon (fencing, running), Rugby union, Tennis	22,737	
1928 Amsterdam	Hilversum (non-jumping)	Modern pentathlon (running)	4,763	
1928 Amsterdam	Olympic Stadium (jumping)	Athletics, Cycling (track), Football (final), Gymnastics	31,600	
1932 Los Angeles	Olympic Stadium (eventing, jumping)	Athletics, Field hockey, Gymnastics	105,000	
1932 Los Angeles	Riviera Country Club (dressage, eventing)	Modern pentathlon (riding)	9,500	
1932 Los Angeles	Westchester (eventing cross country)	None	Not listed.	
1936 Berlin	Döberitz (eventing)	Modern pentathlon (riding)	Not listed.	
1936 Berlin	Mayfield (dressage)	Polo	75,000	
1936 Berlin	Olympic Stadium (jumping)	Athletics, Football (final), Handball (final)	100,000	
1948 London	Aldershot (jumping)	Modern pentathlon (riding, fencing, swimming)	Not listed.	
1948 London	Empire Stadium (jumping)	Athletics, Field hockey (medal matches), Football (medal matches)	82,000	
1948 London	Tweseldown Racecourse (eventing)	None	Not listed.	
1952 Helsinki	Laakso (eventing – riding)	None	12,500	
1952 Helsinki	Olympic Stadium (jumping)	Athletics, Football (final)	70,000	
1952 Helsinki	Ruskeasuo Equestrian Hall (dressage, eventing)	None	Not listed.	
1952 Helsinki	Tali Race Track (eventing – steeplechase)	None	Not listed.	
1956 Stockholm	Lill-Jansskogen (eventing)	None	Not listed.	
1956 Stockholm	Olympic Stadium (dressage, eventing, jumping)	None	6,000	
1956 Stockholm	Ulriksdal (eventing)	None	Not listed.	
1960 Rome	Piazza di Siena (dressage, eventing dressage/ jumping, jumping individual)	None	15,000	
1960 Rome	Pratoni del Vivaro (eventing)	None	Not listed.	
1964 Tokyo	Karuizawa	None	1,500	
1964 Tokyo	National Stadium (team jumping)	Athletics, Football (final)	71,600	
1968 Mexico City	Avándaro Golf Club (eventing)	None	Not listed.	
1968 Mexico City	Campo Marte (dressage, jumping individual)	None	7,885 (jumping); 4,990 (dressage)	
1968 Mexico City	Estadio Olímpico Universitario (jumping team)	Athletics, Ceremonies (opening/ closing)	63,186	
1972 Munich	Dressage Facility Nymphenburg (dressage)	None	8,000	
1972 Munich	Olympiastadion (jumping team)	Athletics, Ceremonies (opening/ closing), Football (final), Modern pentathlon (running)	77,000	
1972 Munich	Riding Facility, Riem (jumping individual, eventing cross-country)	Modern pentathlon (riding)	23,000	
1976 Montreal	Olympic Equestrian Centre, Bromont (all but jumping team final)	Modern pentathlon (riding)	35,000	
1976 Montreal	Olympic Stadium (jumping team final)	Athletics, Ceremonies (opening/ closing), Football (final)	70,000	
1980 Moscow	Grand Arena (jumping individual)	Athletics, Football (final), Opening/closing ceremonies	78,360	
1980 Moscow	Trade Unions' Equestrian Complex (all but jumping individual)	Modern pentathlon (riding, running)	12,000 (jumping); 3,000 (dressage); 2,000 (indoor arena); 400 (eventing endurance)	
1984 Los Angeles	Fairbanks Ranch Country Club (eventing endurance)	None	50,000	
1984 Los Angeles	Santa Anita Park (all but eventing endurance)	None	33,500	
1988 Seoul	Olympic Stadium (jumping individual final)	Athletics, Football (final)	69,950	
1988 Seoul	Seoul Equestrian Park (all but jumping individual final)	Modern pentathlon (riding)	30,000	
1992 Barcelona	Club Hípic El Montayá (dressage, eventing endurance)	None	3,400	
1992 Barcelona	Real Club de Polo de Barcelona (dressage, jumping, eventing final)	Modern pentathlon (riding)	9,600	
1996 Atlanta	Georgia International Horse Park	Cycling (mountain bike), Modern pentathlon (riding, running)	32,000	
2000 Sydney	Sydney International Equestrian Centre	None	50,000	
2004 Athens	Markopoulo Olympic Equestrian Centre	None	Not listed.	
2008 Beijing	Hong Kong Equestrian Venues	None	18,000	
2012 London	Greenwich Park	Modern pentathlon (riding, running)	23,000	
2016 Rio de Janeiro	National Equestrian Center	None	14,000	
2020 Tokyo	Tokyo Equestrian Park	None	9,300	
2020 Tokyo	Sea Forest Cross-Country Course (eventing cross-country)	None	16,000	
2024 Paris	Palace of Versailles	Modern pentathlon (riding, swimming, running, fencing)	40,000	
2028 Los Angeles	Santa Anita Park	None	33,500	
2032 Brisbane	Brisbane Showgrounds	None	15,000	
2032 Brisbane	Barrambin / Victoria Park (eventing cross-country)	Cycling (BMX freestyle)	25,000	

== Gallery of venues ==
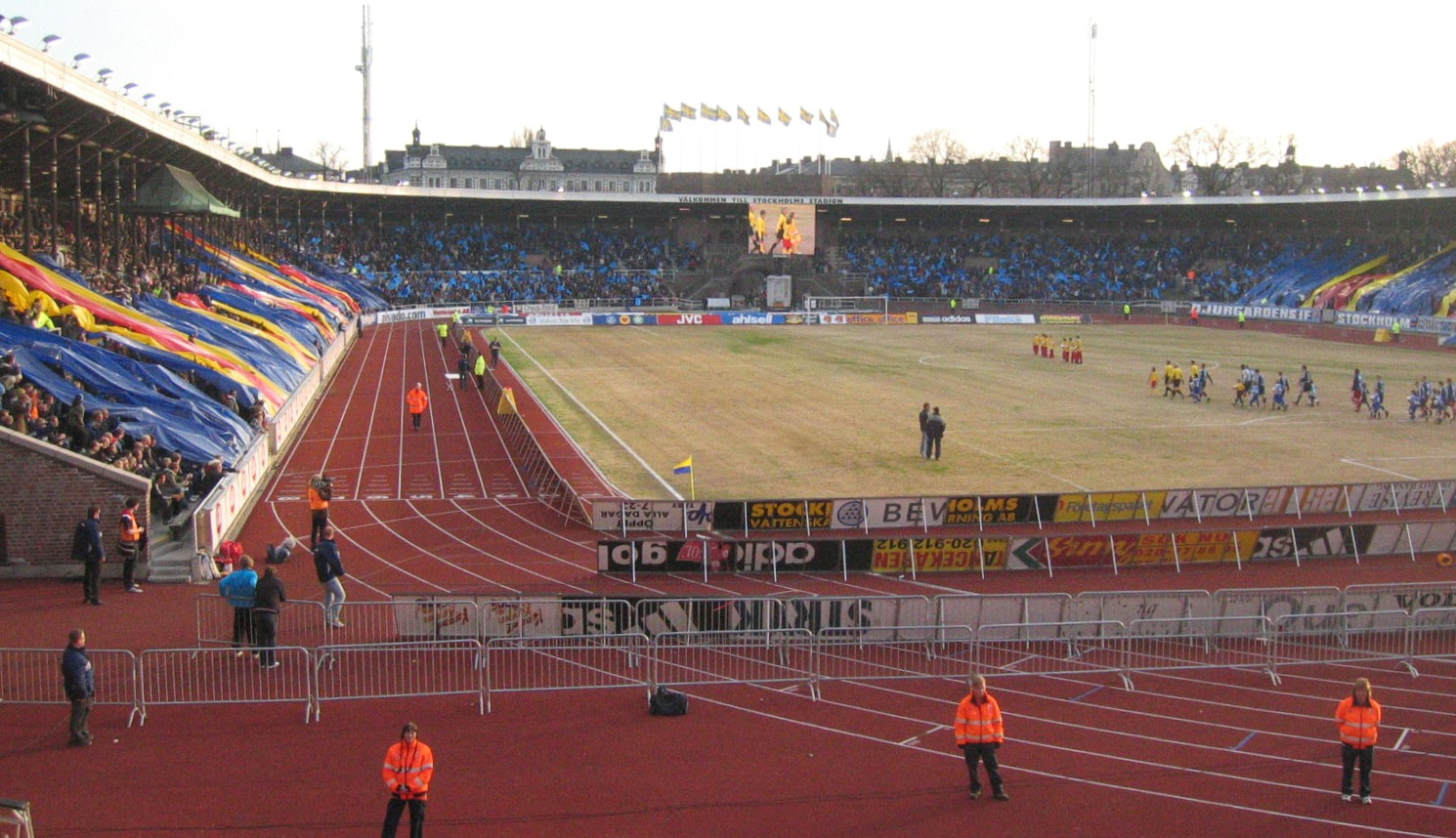
Stockholm Olympic Stadium is the only venue to host equestrian events at the Summer Olympics twice, doing so in 1912 and 1956.

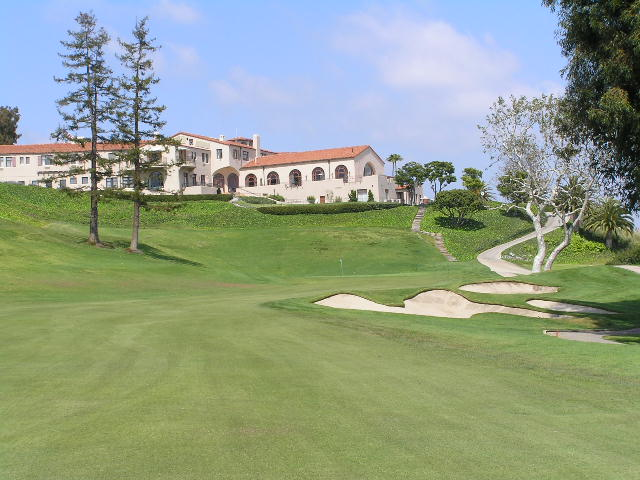
The Riviera Country Club hosted dressage and eventing at the 1932 Summer Olympics in Los Angeles.

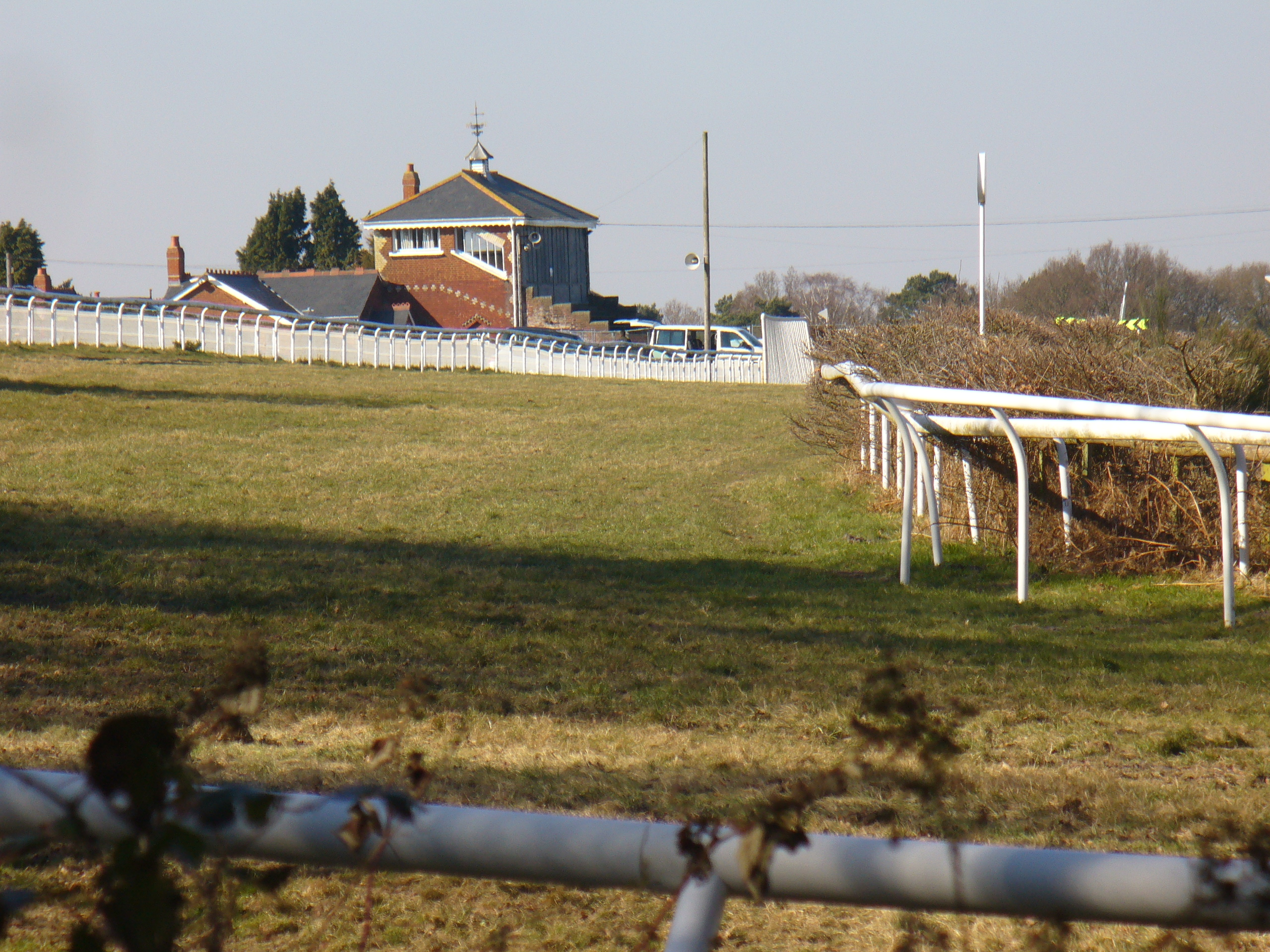
Tweseldown Racecourse hosted eventing at the 1948 Summer Olympics in London.

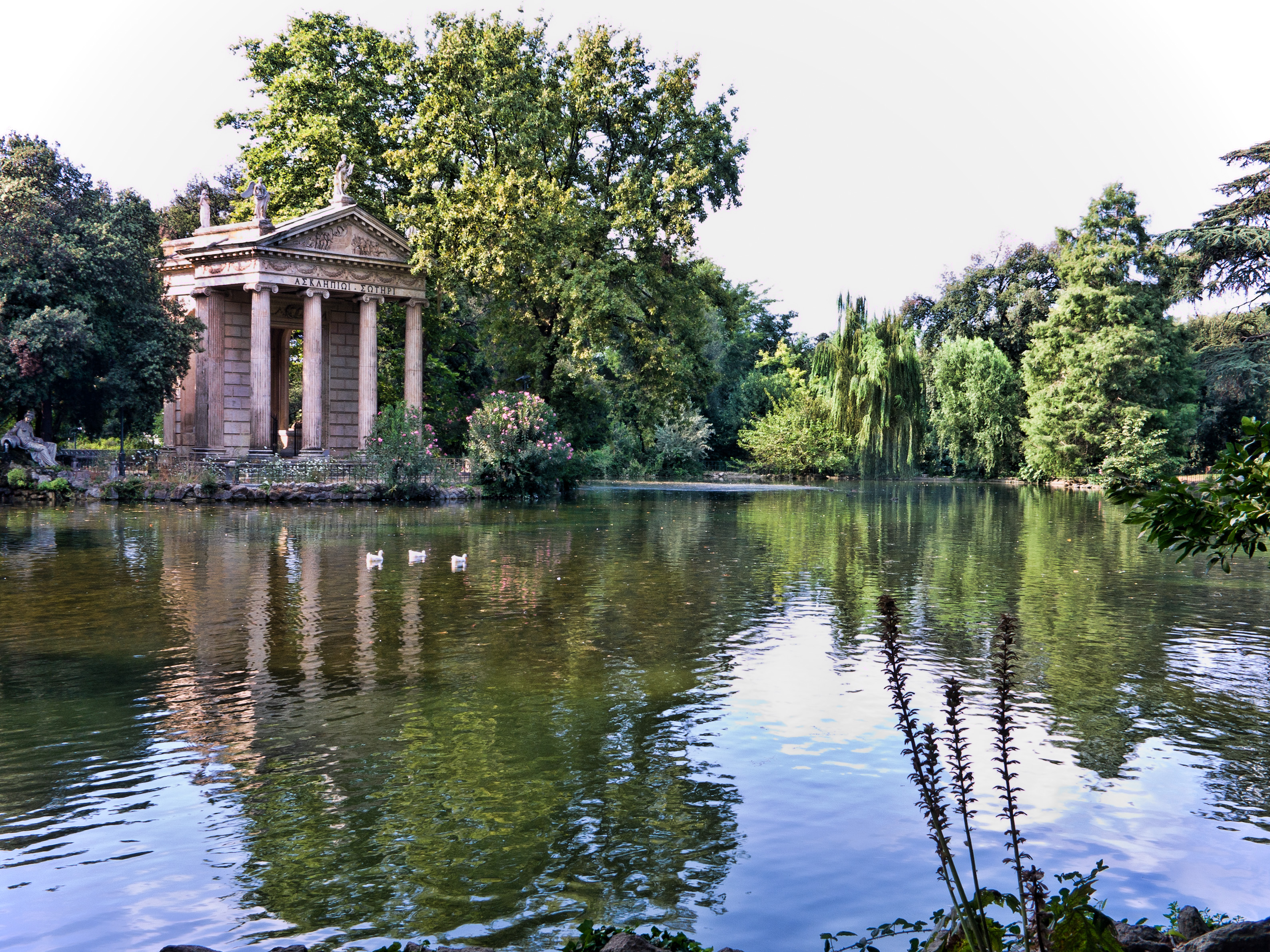
Villa Borghese hosted equestrian at the 1960 Summer Olympics in Rome.

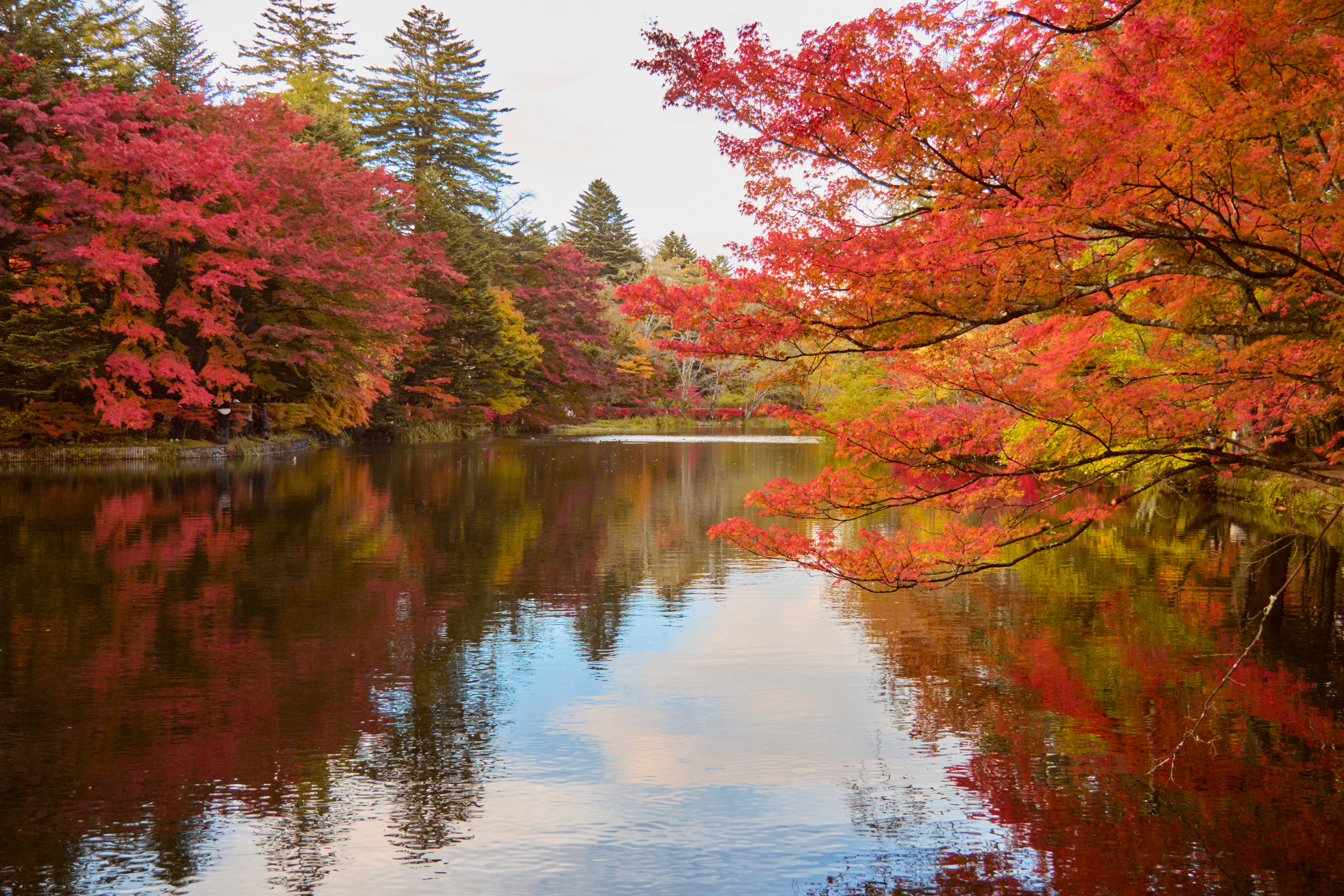
Karuizawa hosted equestrian at the 1964 Summer Olympics in Tokyo.

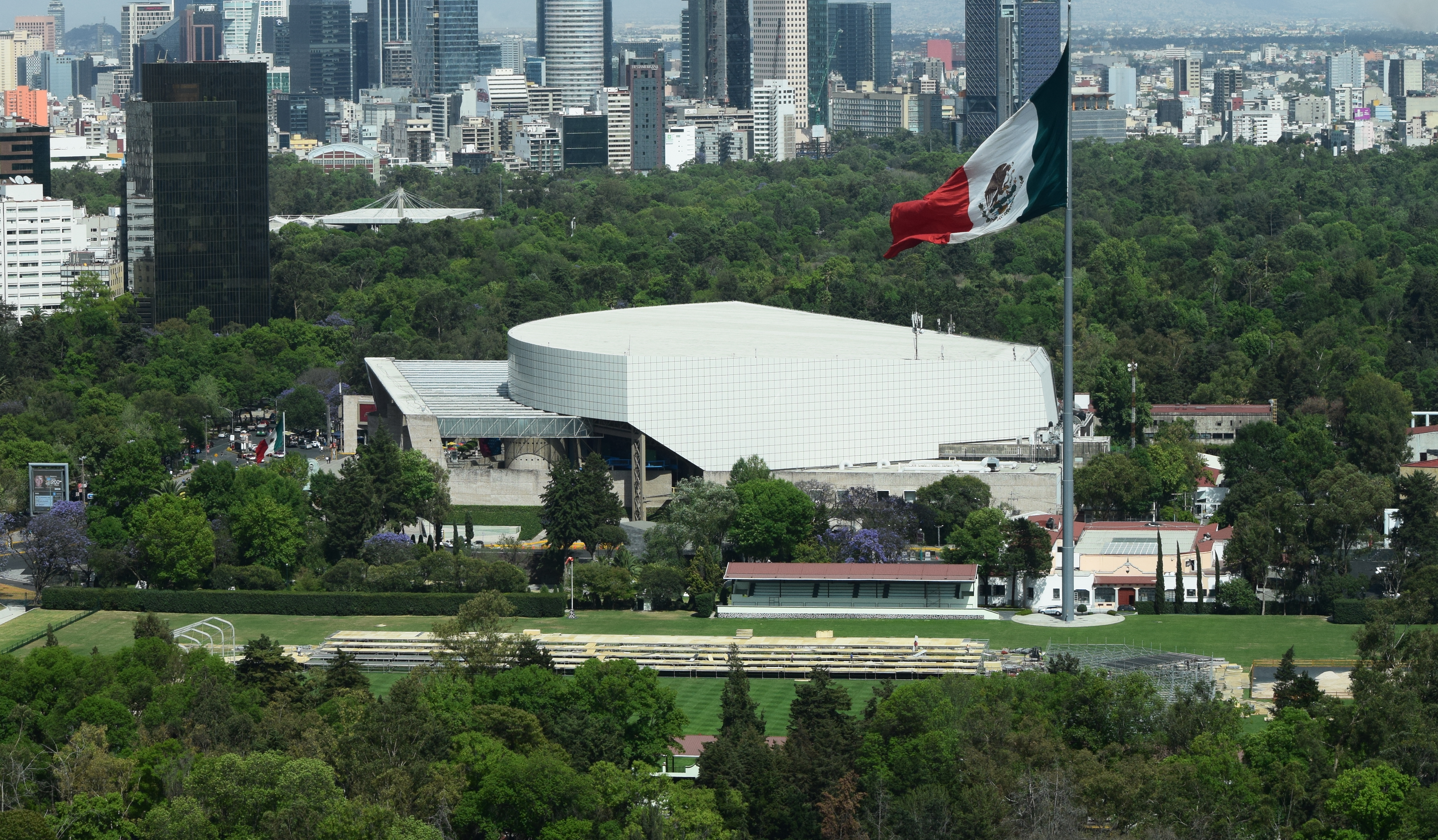
Campo Marte hosted dressage and jumping at the 1968 Summer Olympics in Mexico City.

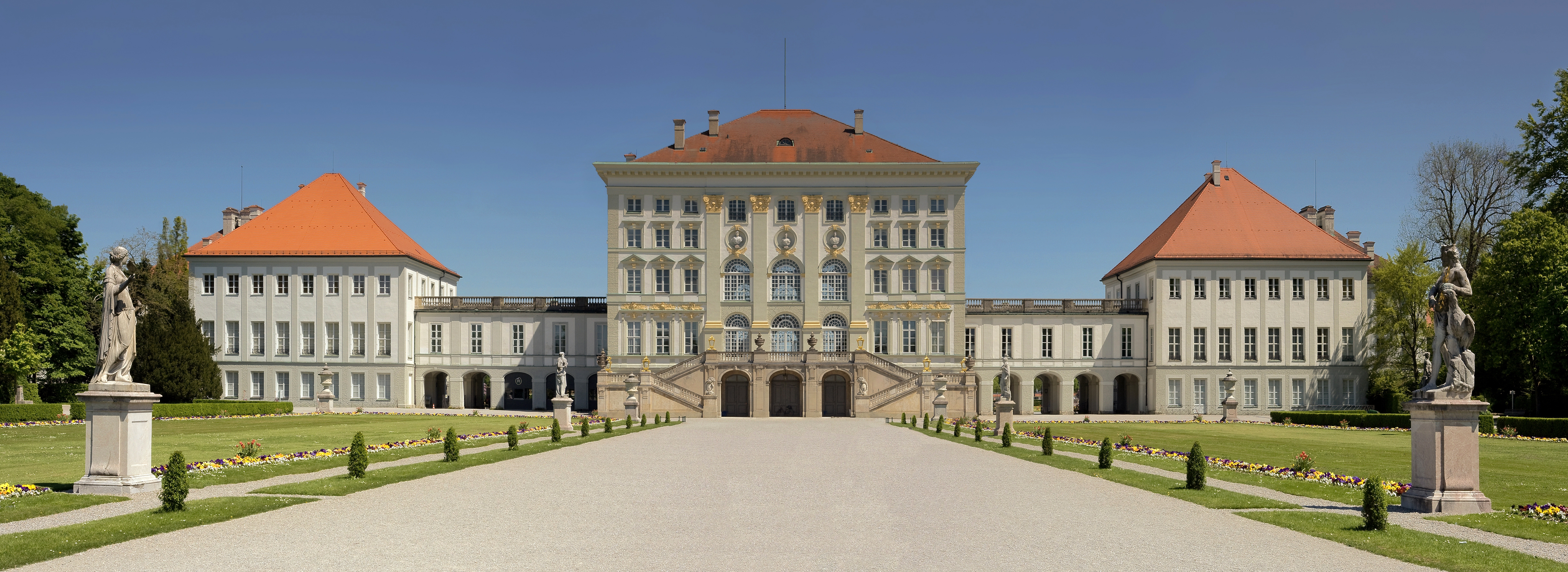
Nymphenburg Palace hosted dressage at the 1972 Summer Olympics in Munich.

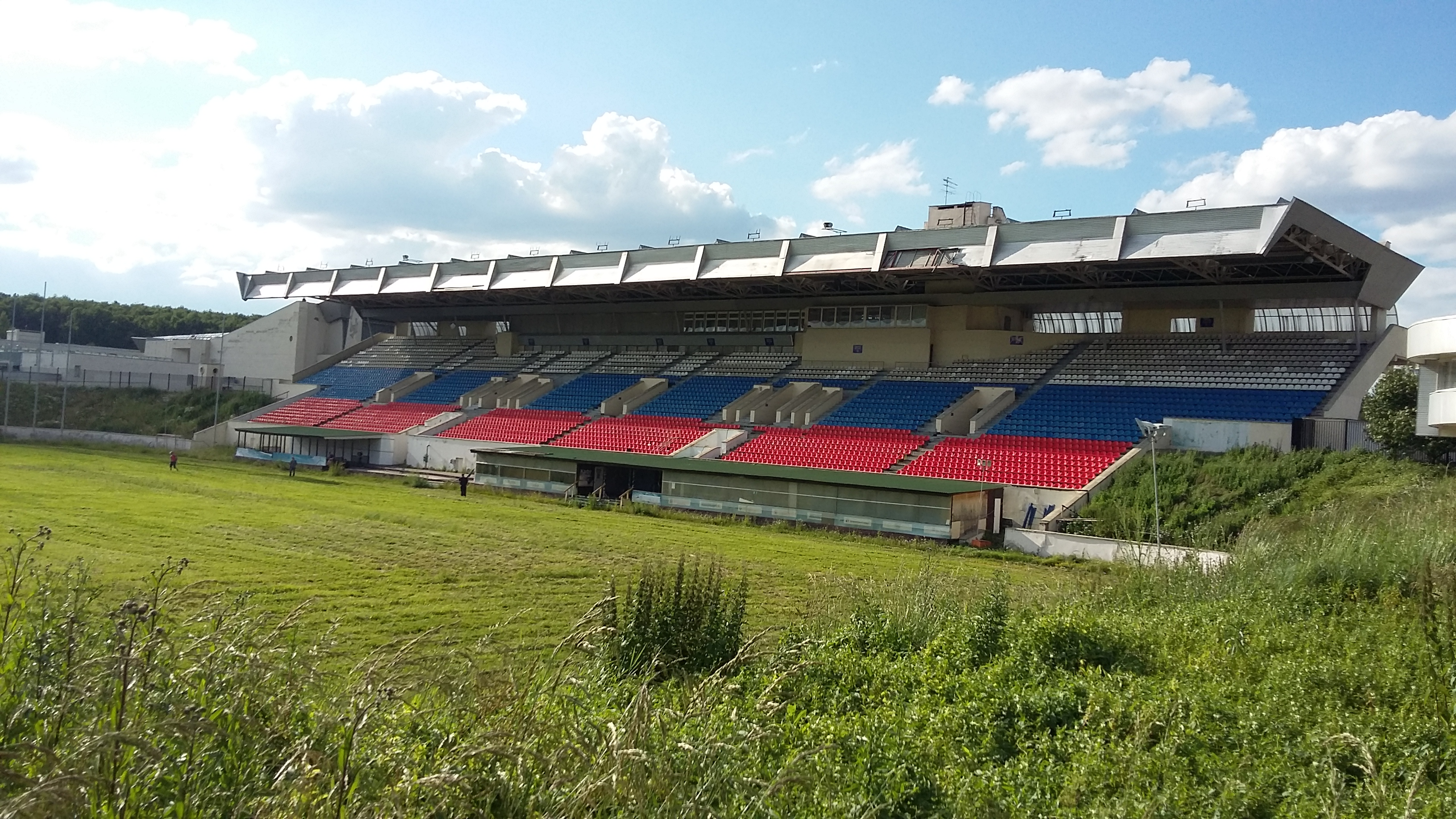
Trade Unions' Equestrian Complex hosted equestrian at the 1980 Summer Olympics in Moscow.

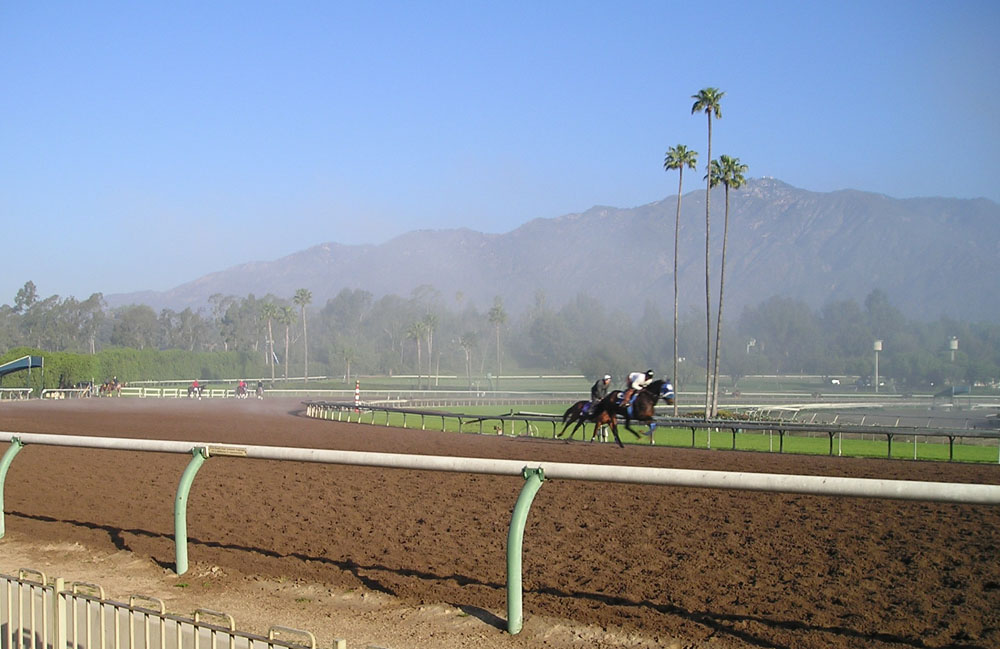
Santa Anita Park hosted equestrian at the 1984 Summer Olympics in Los Angeles and will do so for a second time in 2028.

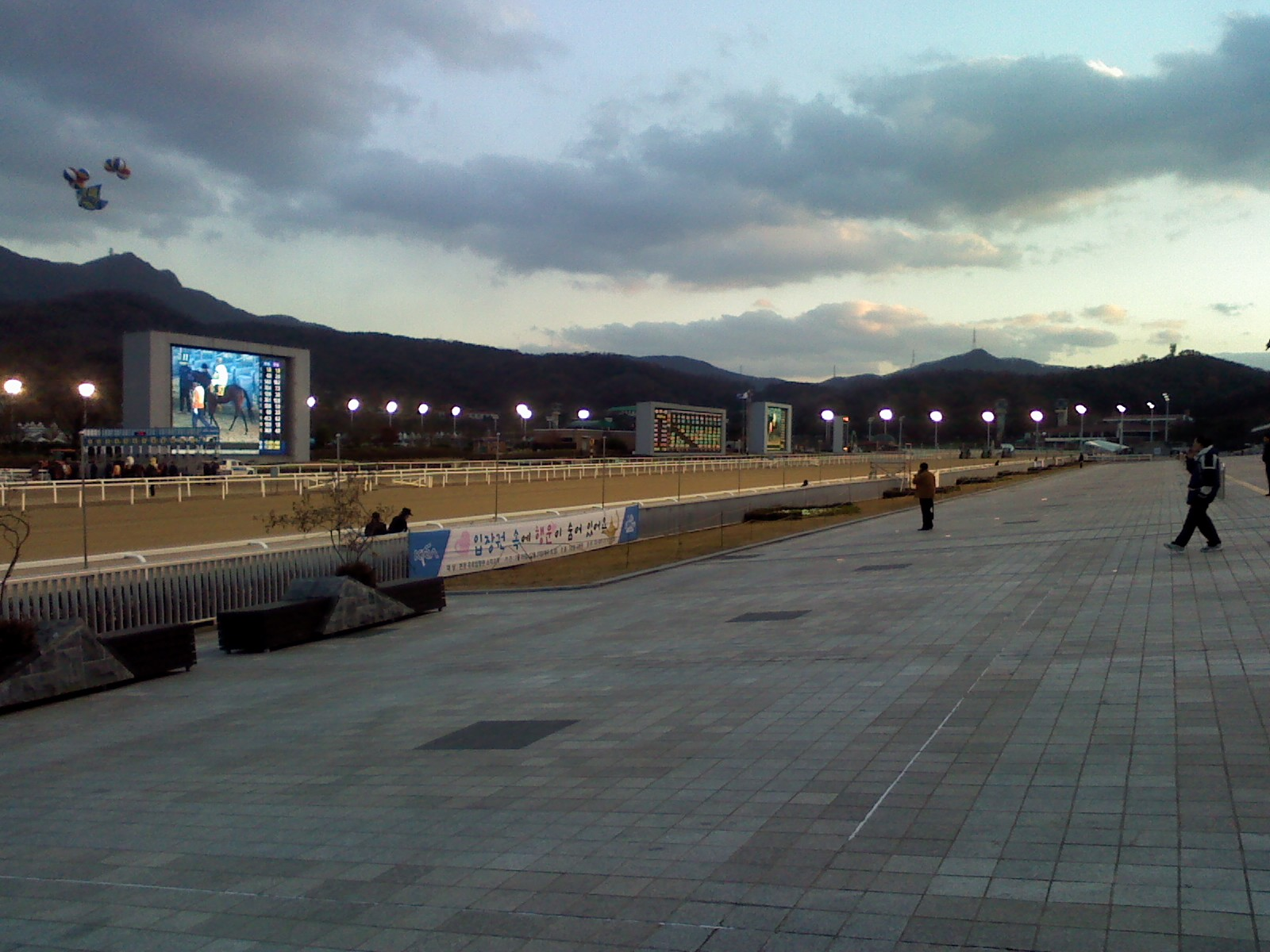
LetsRun Park Seoul hosted equestrian at the 1988 Summer Olympics.

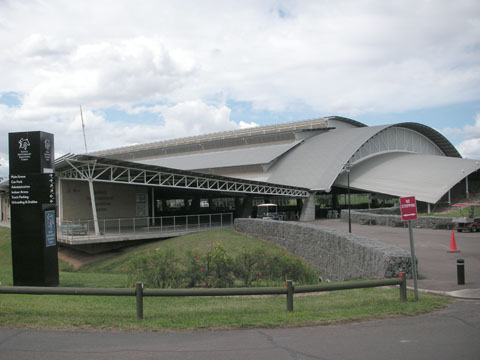
The Sydney International Equestrian Centre hosted equestrian at the 2000 Summer Olympics.

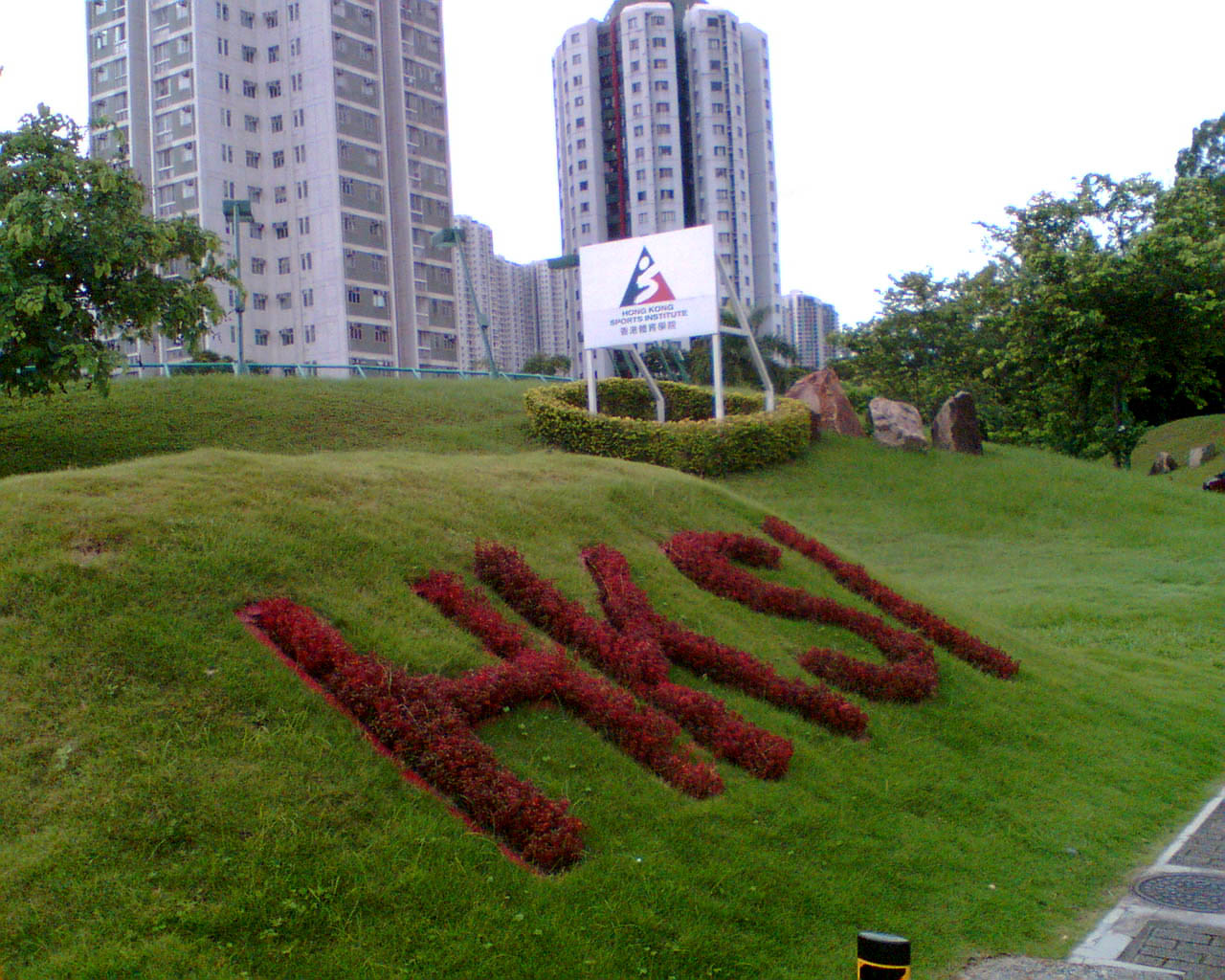
The Hong Kong Sports Institute hosted equestrian for the 2008 Summer Olympics in Beijing.

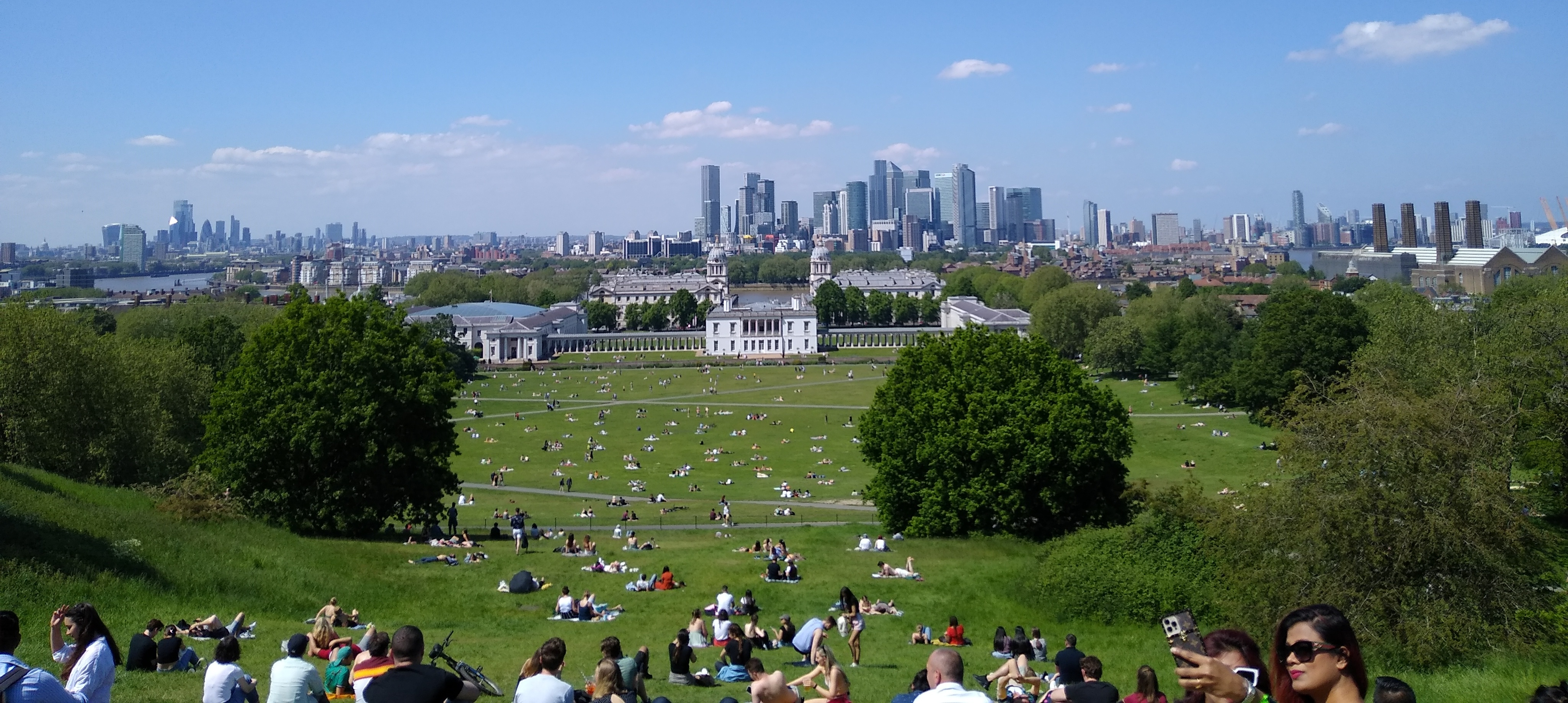
Greenwich Park hosted equestrian at the 2012 Summer Olympics in London.

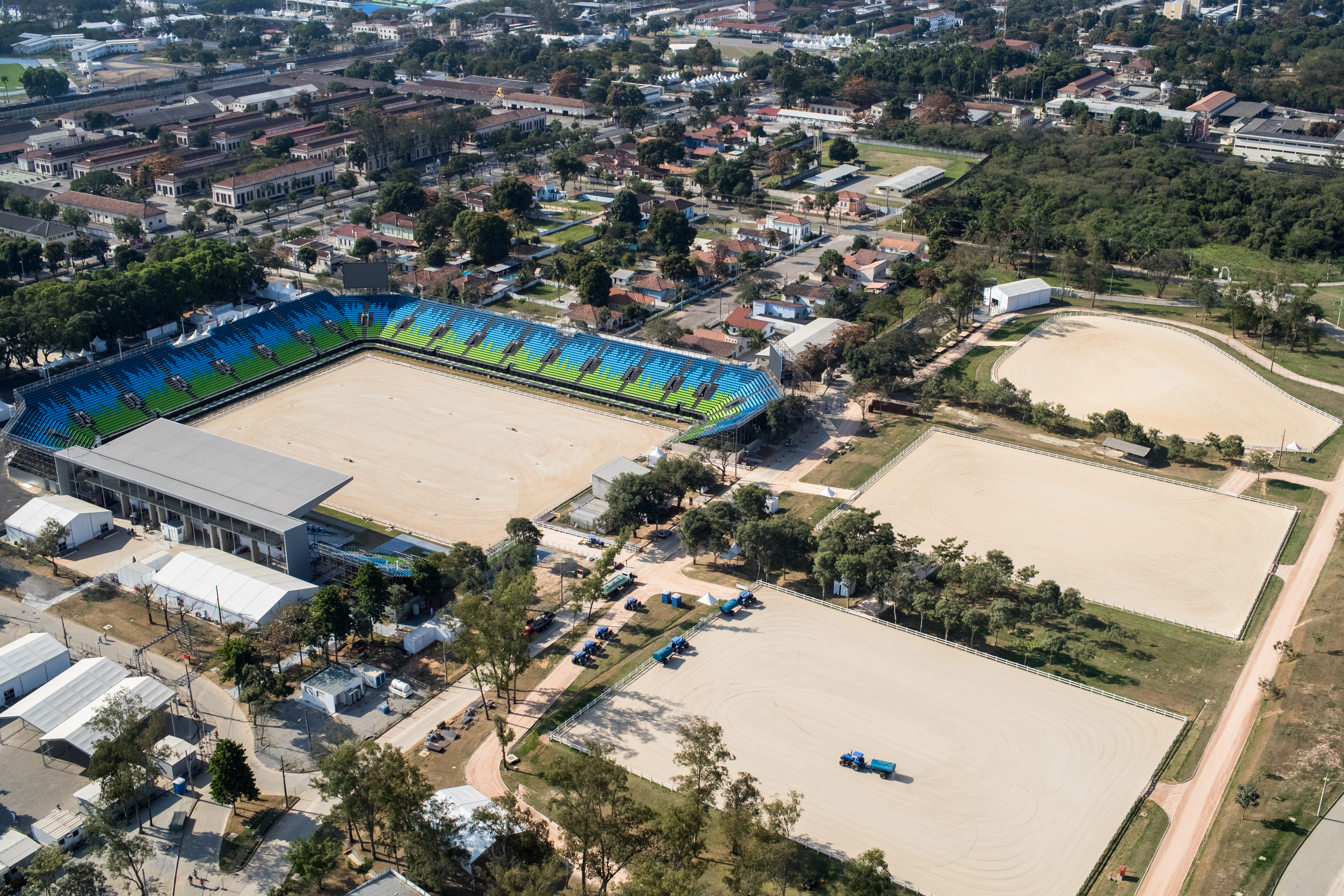
The National Equestrian Center hosted equestrian at the 2016 Summer Olympics in Rio de Janeiro.

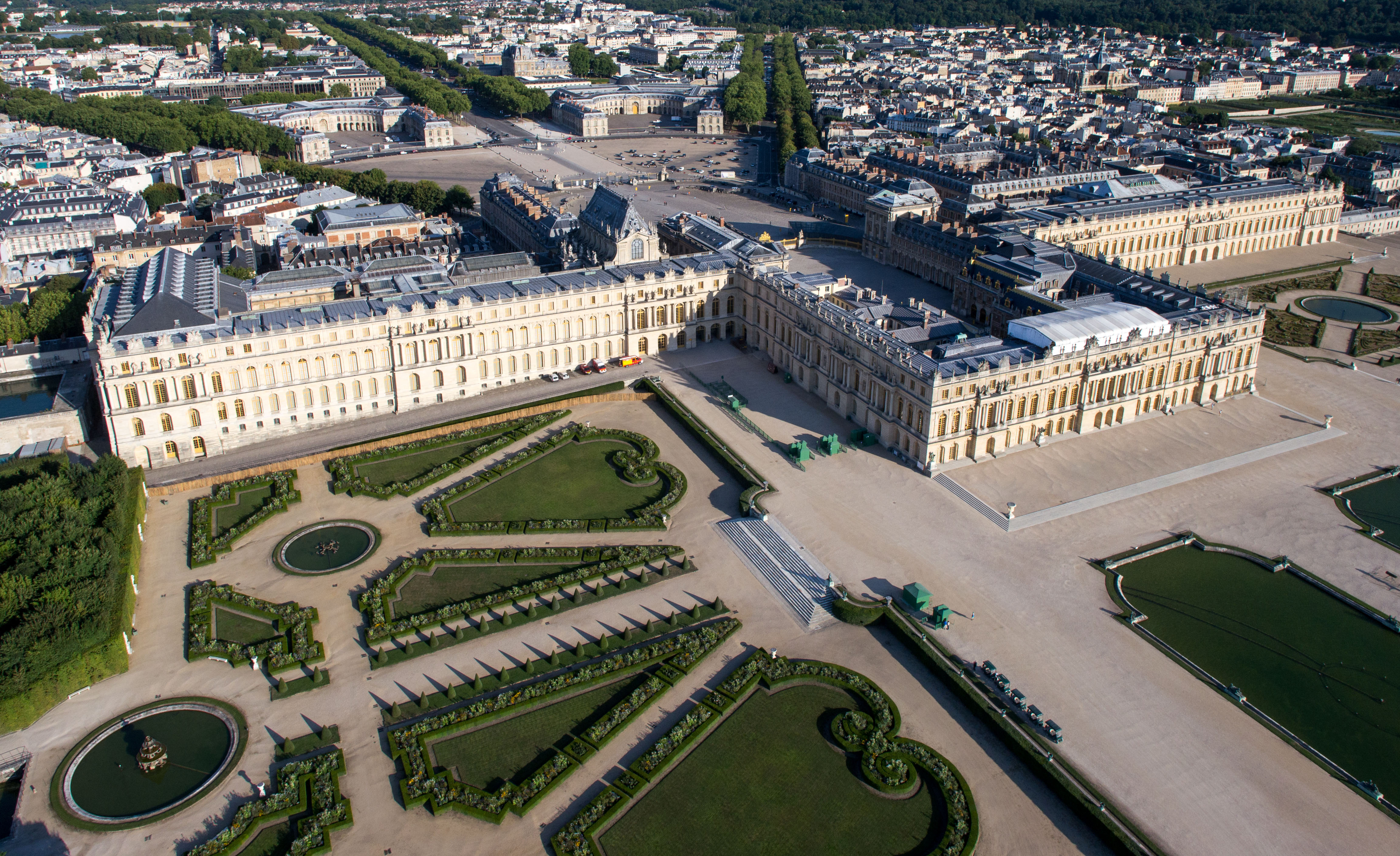
The grounds outside the Palace of Versailles hosted equestrian at the 2024 Summer Olympics in Paris.
