= 1978 World Modern Pentathlon Championships =

The 1978 World Modern Pentathlon Championships were held in Jönköping, Sweden.

== Medal summary ==
=== Men's events ===
Event	(gold) Gold	(silver) Silver	(bronze) Bronze
Individual	Pavel Lednev (URS)	Janusz Pyciak-Peciak (POL)	Neil Glenesk (USA)
Team	Poland; Janusz Pyciak-Peciak; Slawomir Rotkiewicz; Zbigniew Pacelt	West Germany; Norbert Kühn; Axel Starmann; Gerhard Werner	Soviet Union; Pavel Lednev; Oleg Bulgakov; Aleksandr Tarev

=== Women's events ===
Event	(gold) Gold	(silver) Silver	(bronze) Bronze
Individual	Wendy Norman (GBR)	Wendy Skipworth (GBR)	Nancy Absolon (CAN)
Team	Great Britain	United States	West Germany

== Medal table ==
Rank	Nation	Gold	Silver	Bronze	Total
1	Great Britain (GBR)	2	1	0	3
2	Poland (POL)	1	1	0	2
3	Soviet Union (URS)	1	0	1	2
4	United States (USA)	0	1	1	2
4	West Germany (FRG)	0	1	1	2
6	Canada (CAN)	0	0	1	1
Totals (6 entries)		4	4	4	12

== See also ==
- World Modern Pentathlon Championship
