= 1969 World Modern Pentathlon Championships =

The 1969 World Modern Pentathlon Championships were held in Budapest, Hungary from 21 – 25 September 1969.

== Medal summary ==
=== Men's events ===
Event	(gold) Gold	(silver) Silver	(bronze) Bronze
Individual	András Balczó (HUN)	Boris Onishchenko (URS)	Björn Ferm (SWE)
Team	Soviet Union; Stasys Šaparnis; Vyacheslav Byelov; Boris Onishchenko	Hungary; Pál Bakó; Peter Kelemen; András Balczó	West Germany; Walter Esser; Elmar Frings; Karsten Reder

== Medal table ==
Rank	Nation	Gold	Silver	Bronze	Total
1	Hungary (HUN)	1	1	0	2
1	Soviet Union (URS)	1	1	0	2
3	Sweden (SWE)	0	0	1	1
3	West Germany (FRG)	0	0	1	1
Totals (4 entries)		2	2	2	6

== See also ==
- World Modern Pentathlon Championship
