= Péter Kelemen (pentathlete) =

Hungarian modern pentathlete (born 1946)

Personal information
- Born: 2 September 1946 (age 79) Rákoscsaba, Hungary
- Height: 1.79 m (5 ft 10 in)
- Weight: 71 kg (157 lb)

Sport
- Country: Hungary
- Sport: Modern pentathlon
- Club: Újpesti Dózsa SC, Budapest
Medal record
World Championships
Silver medal – second place	1969 Budapest	Team
Gold medal – first place	1970 Warendorf	Individual
Gold medal – first place	1970 Warendorf	Team
Silver medal – second place	1971 San Antonio	Team
Bronze medal – third place	1973 London	Team
Junior World Championships
Gold medal – first place	1966 Bratislava	Individual
Gold medal – first place	1966 Bratislava	Team
Bronze medal – third place	1967 Aldershot	Individual
National Championships
Silver medal – second place	1968 Budapest	Individual
Gold medal – first place	1968 Budapest	Team
Gold medal – first place	1969 Budapest	Individual
Gold medal – first place	1969 Budapest	Team
Silver medal – second place	1971 Budapest	Team
Gold medal – first place	1972 Budapest	Team
Silver medal – second place	1973 Budapest	Team
Silver medal – second place	1974 Budapest	Team
Gold medal – first place	1975 Budapest	Team
Bronze medal – third place	1976 Budapest	Team
Bronze medal – third place	1977 Budapest	Team

Péter Kelemen (born 2 September 1946) is a retired Hungarian modern pentathlete.

Kelemen began his career in 1958 as a swimmer for Budapesti VSC. He switched to modern pentathlon in 1963, following the advice from his PE teacher, joining Újpesti Dózsa. His first major achievement in the sport came in 1966 when he won a gold medal at the Junior World Championship, in both team and individual events. After being ninth at the 1969 World Championship, he won the same competition the following year, in Warendorf, Germany, by defeating his compatriot András Balczó by only three points, gathering around 5000 points in total.

Kelemen was the first modern pentathlete to win the individual event at both Junior and Adult World Championships.

In 1970, Kelemen was chosen as the Hungarian Sportsman of the Year, while the pentathlon team was chosen as the Team of the Year.

He was selected as a back-up team member for the 1972 Summer Olympics, but was excluded from the team later due to a conflict between his coach, András Nyulászi, and the Hungarian Modern Pentathlon Association.

Kelemen retired from the sport in 1977 and started a coaching career. He coached Újpesti Dózsa and Budapesti VSC as a fencing coach. In 1988, he was invited to Seoul in order to coach the South Korean Modern Pentathlon Team as a fencing and compound coach. From 1981, he was the director of the shooting center at Újpesti Dózsa, and also coached Csilla Füri, another Hungarian modern pentathlete. He also served as a director of the technical board in the National Modern Pentathlon Association. From 2001 until his retirement in 2007, he coached the BHSE's Modern Pentathlon Team.

== Personal life ==
His first wife, Jutka Békei, is a former kayak athlete; the couple had two sons, Szabolcs, born 14 December 1971, and Zoltan, born 13 October 1977.
