= Soviet Union top ten athletes of the year =

Sports journalist award in the USSR

Since a certain time until 1991 in the end of each year the Federation of Sports Journalists of the USSR held an inquest among its members to name top ten athletes of the year of the USSR. Here is a list of them.

== List ==
=== 1971 ===
- Vasily Alexeyev (Athlete of the Year)
- Yevgeniy Arzhanov
- Valeriy Borzov
- Alexander Medved
- Faina Melnik
- Boris Onishchenko
- Lyudmila Pakhomova and Alexander Gorshkov
- Irina Rodnina and Aleksei Ulanov
- Nina Statkevich
- Ludmilla Tourischeva

=== 1972 ===
Alphabetical order.

- Mykola Avilov
- Vasily Alexeyev
- Valeriy Borzov
- Lyudmila Bragina
- Olga Korbut
- Galina Kulakova
- Alexander Medved
- Viktor Saneyev
- Ludmilla Tourischeva
- Vyacheslav Vedenin

=== 1973 ===
- Irina Rodnina (Athlete of the Year)
- Ludmilla Tourischeva
- Faina Melnik
- Galina Shugurova
- Nadezhda Chizhova
- Valeri Kharlamov
- Pavel Pervushin (weightlifting)
- Levan Tediashvili
- Pavel Lednev
- Anatoly Karpov

=== 1975 ===
- Tatyana Averina
- Sergei Belov
- Oleg Blokhin
- Irina Kalinina
- Anatoly Karpov
- Yevgeny Kulikov
- Pavel Lednev
- Zebinisso Rustamova
- Ludmilla Tourischeva
- Alexander Yakushev

Gennady Moisseev

=== 1979 ===
Ordered by number of points:

1. Boris Mikhailov (Athlete of the Year)
2. Vladimir Salnikov
3. Yurik Vardanyan
4. Anatoly Karpov
5. Alexander Dityatin
6. Natalya Linichuk and Gennadi Karponossov
7. Sergei Sukhoruchenkov
8. Lyudmila Kondratyeva
9. Galina Kulakova
10. Nellie Kim

=== 1983 ===
- Tamara Bykova (Athlete of the Year)
- Dmitry Bilozerchev
- Vladimir Salnikov
- Garry Kasparov
- Natalia Yurchenko
- Yurik Vardanyan
- Vladislav Tretyak
- Anatoly Starostin
- Fyodor Cherenkov
- Sergei Litvinov

=== 1984 ===
Announced on December 28, 1984.

- Sergey Bubka (Athlete of the Year)
- Yurik Vardanyan
- Yuri Sedykh
- Oleg Bozhev
- Anatoly Beloglazov (wrestling)
- Sergei Zabolotnov
- Nikolay Zimyatov
- Elena Valova and Oleg Vasiliev
- Sergei Kopylov
- Olga Mostepanova

=== 1986 ===
Announced on December 27, 1986.

- Sergey Bubka (Athlete of the Year)
- Igor Belanov
- Igor Zhelezovski
- Yury Zakharevich
- Garry Kasparov
- Igor Polyansky
- Arvydas Sabonis
- Yuri Sedykh
- Marina Stepanova
- Andrei Chesnokov

=== 1988 ===
Ordered by number of points:

1. Vladimir Salnikov (Athlete of the Year)
2. Sergey Bubka
3. Arvydas Sabonis
4. Vladimir Artemov
5. Yuri Zakharevich
6. Yelena Shushunova
7. Alexei Mikhailichenko
8. Tatyana Samolenko-Dorovskikh
9. Tamara Tikhonova
10. Gintautas Umaras

=== 1989 ===
Ordered by number of points:

1. Garry Kasparov (Athlete of the Year)
2. Elena Välbe
3. Fyodor Cherenkov
4. Igor Korobchinsky
5. Svetlana Boguinskaya
6. Radion Gataullin
7. Alexandra Timoshenko
8. Igor Zhelezovski
9. Israel Akopkokhyan (boxing)
10. Alexander Karelin

=== 1990 ===
Ordered by number of points:

1. Garry Kasparov (Athlete of the Year)
2. Elena Välbe
3. Andrei Cherkasov
4. Sergei Yuran
5. Anatoly Khrapaty
6. Jüri Jaanson
7. Radion Gataullin
8. Alexander Karelin
9. Svetlana Boginskaya
10. Andrey Kurnyavka (boxing)
