= 1970 World Modern Pentathlon Championships =

The 1970 World Modern Pentathlon Championships were held in Warendorf, West Germany from 1 – 5 August 1970.

== Medal summary ==
=== Men's events ===
Event	(gold) Gold	(silver) Silver	(bronze) Bronze
Individual	Peter Kelemen (HUN)	András Balczó (HUN)	Boris Onishchenko (URS)
Team	Hungary; Pál Bakó; Peter Kelemen; András Balczó	Soviet Union; Stasys Šaparnis; Vyacheslav Byelov; Boris Onishchenko	West Germany; Walter Esser; Elmar Frings; Karsten Reder

== Medal table ==
Rank	Nation	Gold	Silver	Bronze	Total
1	Hungary (HUN)	2	1	0	3
2	Soviet Union (URS)	0	1	1	2
3	West Germany (FRG)	0	0	1	1
Totals (3 entries)		2	2	2	6

== See also ==
- World Modern Pentathlon Championship
