= Pavel Lednyov =

Soviet modern pentathlete

Personal information
- Nationality: Soviet Union
- Born: 25 March 1943 Nizhny Novgorod, Russian SFSR, Soviet Union
- Died: 23 November 2010 (aged 67) Moscow, Russia

Sport
- Sport: Modern pentathlon
Medal record
Men's modern pentathlon
Representing Soviet Union
Olympic Games
Gold medal – first place	1972 Münich	Team
Gold medal – first place	1980 Moscow	Team
Silver medal – second place	1968 Mexico City	Team
Silver medal – second place	1976 Montreal	Individual
Bronze medal – third place	1968 Mexico City	Individual
Bronze medal – third place	1972 Münich	Individual
Bronze medal – third place	1980 Moscow	Individual
World Championships
Gold medal – first place	1973 London	Individual
Gold medal – first place	1973 London	Team
Gold medal – first place	1974 Moscow	Individual
Gold medal – first place	1974 Moscow	Team
Gold medal – first place	1975 Mexico City	Individual
Gold medal – first place	1978 Jönköping	Individual
Silver medal – second place	1977 San Antonio	Individual
Bronze medal – third place	1975 Mexico City	Team
Bronze medal – third place	1978 Jönköping	Team

Pavel Serafimovich Lednyov (Russian: Павел Серафимович Леднёв, Ukrainian: Павло Серафимович Ледньов; 25 March 1943, Nizhny Novgorod, Russia – 23 November 2010, Moscow, Russia) was a Russian-born Ukrainian soviet modern pentathlete and Olympic Champion. He won a total of seven Olympic medals in modern pentathlon, more than any other player to date. He won four individual World Championships, and two gold medals as a member of the Soviet team. Represented SKA Lviv) at the competitions.

== Career ==
Lednyov competed in 1968, 1972, 1976 and 1980 Summer Olympics, and won a total of two gold medals, two silver medals, and three bronze medals.

Lednyov became Soviet champion in 1968 and qualified for the Summer Olympics in Mexico City. At his first Olympic games, he won an individual bronze medal, and a silver medal with the Soviet team, which consisted of Lednyov, Boris Onishchenko, and Stasys Šaparnis. In Munich in 1972, he won a silver medal in the individual competition, behind András Balczó, and an Olympic gold medal in the team competition, together with Boris Onishchenko and Vladimir Shmelyov.

In London in 1973, Lednyov became double World Champion, by winning the individual competition with 5,412 points, 145 points ahead of Shmelyov, and the Soviet team won the team competition before West Germany. In 1973 he also became a national champion for the second time. He became a double World Champion again in 1974, and in 1975 he became an individual World Champion for the third time.

At the 1976 Summer Olympics in Montreal, he won an individual silver medal, behind gold winner Janusz Pyciak-Peciak. In 1978 he became World Champion again, his fourth in the individual competition. At the 1980 Summer Olympics in Moscow, he won an individual bronze medal, and also his second Olympic gold medal with the Soviet team, together with Anatoli Starostin and Yevgeny Lipeyev.

== Awards ==
Lednyov was listed among the Soviet Union top ten athletes of the year by the Federation of Sports Journalists of the USSR in 1973 and 1975.
