= Yevgeny Lipeyev =

Soviet modern pentathlete

Personal information
- Born: 28 February 1958 (age 68) Krasnodar, Russian SFSR, Soviet Union

Sport
- Sport: Modern pentathlon
Medal record
Men's modern pentathlon
Representing Soviet Union
Olympic Games
Gold medal – first place	1980 Moscow	Team

Yevgeny Lipeyev (born 28 February 1958) is a former Soviet modern pentathlete and Olympic Champion. He competed at the 1980 Summer Olympics in Moscow, where he won a gold medal in the team competition (together with Anatoli Starostin and Pavel Lednyov), and placed 14th in the individual competition.
