= Boris Onishchenko =

Soviet modern pentathlete (born 1937)

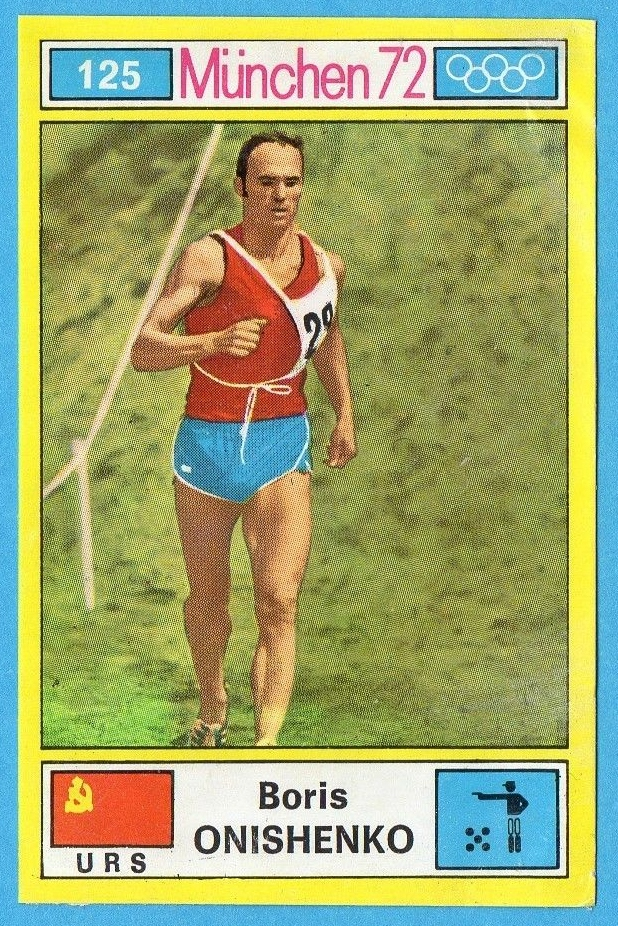
- Onishchenko at the 1972 Summer Olympics

Personal information
- Native name: Борис Онищенко
- Full name: Boris Grigoryevich Onishchenko
- Born: 19 September 1937 (age 88) Bereznyaky, (Note: Now in Lubny Raion, Poltava Oblast, Ukraine.) Ukrainian SSR, Soviet Union
- Height: 178 cm (5 ft 10 in)
- Weight: 74 kg (163 lb)

Sport
- Country: Soviet Union
- Event: Modern pentathlon
Medal record
Representing the Soviet Union
Olympic Games
Silver medal – second place	1968 Mexico City	Team
Gold medal – first place	1972 Munich	Team
Silver medal – second place	1972 Munich	Individual
World Championships
Bronze medal – third place	1967 Jönköping	Team
Gold medal – first place	1969 Budapest	Team
Silver medal – second place	1969 Budapest	Individual
Silver medal – second place	1970 Warendorf	Team
Bronze medal – third place	1970 Warendorf	Individual
Gold medal – first place	1971 San Antonio	Individual
Gold medal – first place	1971 San Antonio	Team
Gold medal – first place	1973 London	Team
Bronze medal – third place	1973 London	Individual
Gold medal – first place	1974 Moscow	Team
Bronze medal – third place	1974 Moscow	Individual

Boris Grigoryevich Onishchenko (Note: Also transliterated as Onyshchenko, Onishenko, Onischenko.) (Russian: Борис Григорьевич Онищенко, pronounced [bɐˈrʲiz ɡrʲɪˈɡorʲjɪvʲɪtɕ ɐnʲɪˈɕːenkə]; Ukrainian: Борис Григорович Онищенко, romanized: Borys Hryhorovych Onyshchenko, pronounced [boˈrɪz ɦrɪˈɦɔrowɪtʃ onɪˈʃtʃɛnko]; born 19 September 1937) is a former Soviet modern pentathlete who competed at the 1968, 1972 and 1976 Summer Olympics.

He was a member of the Soviet gold medal team in the 1972 Olympics. From 1967 to 1974, he competed in six World Modern Pentathlon Championships, winning gold five times as an individual or as part of the Soviet squad. He is best known for his disqualification from the 1976 Summer Olympics and subsequent lifetime ban for cheating by means of an illegally modified épée that falsely registered hits.

== Life and career ==
Onishchenko was born in 1937 in a village of Khorol Raion, Poltava Oblast, Ukrainian S.S.R. He was a strong swimmer early on and taught at the Dynamo Sports Club.

His first world competition was at the 1967 World Modern Pentathlon Championships where he competed with Stasys Šaparnis and Edvard Sdobnikov. The Soviet team won a bronze medal at the event. The following year, he took a silver medal at the 1968 Mexico City Olympics with Šaparnis and Pavel Lednyov. He went on to win gold five times at the world championships, one as an individual. In 1971, he was awarded the Merited Master of Sports and in 1972, he received the Order of the Red Banner of Labour.

In the 1972 Olympics in Munich, he competed with the Soviet team of Lednyov and Vladimir Shmelyov that captured the gold. Onishchenko himself took an individual silver medal in the event, finishing behind András Balczó of Hungary.

=== 1976 Olympics ===
In 1976, the 38-year old Onishchenko entered the Olympics as a three-time world champion but never having won the gold as an individual. Onishchenko was a top fencer and had won gold in the 1974 World Modern Pentathlon Championships in Moscow. Although he was rated fourth, which would relegate him to being a reserve, Onishchenko won a preliminary tournament in the Soviet Union that pushed him onto the team.

After the first event of the pentathlon, the Soviet team found itself in fourth place, trailing closely behind Britain. Fencing was the next event: a one-touch épée tournament. During Onishchenko's bout with British team captain Jim Fox, the British team protested that Onishchenko's weapon had gone off without actually hitting anything. In fact, Onishchenko's épée was in the air away from Fox when the hit was registered.

Fox requested an examination of Onishchenko's weapon, which was found to be faulty, resulting in points being deducted from Onishchenko's score. However, the British team filed an official protest and demanded further examination. The bout was allowed to continue, and he won by a large margin.

In electric épée fencing, a touch is registered on the scoring box when the tip of the weapon is depressed with a force of 750 grams, completing a circuit formed by the weapon, body cord, and box. It was found that Onischenko's épée had been illegally modified to include a switch that allowed him to close this circuit without actually depressing the tip of his weapon, so he could register a touch without making any contact on his opponent. Onischenko was ejected from the competition, which forced the Soviet Union to scratch from the team event. The British team that exposed Onishchenko went on to win the gold medal.

Newspapers decried him as "Disonischenko" and "Boris the Cheat". Two months later it was reported he had been called before Soviet leader Leonid Brezhnev for a personal scolding.

== Post-fencing life ==
After his lifetime ban from the sport that was issued by the International Olympic Committee, Onishchenko worked as a taxi driver in Kyiv and competed in Soviet national events.
