= Vyacheslav Belov (pentathlete) =

Soviet modern pentathlete (1938–2010)

Personal information
- Born: 25 February 1938 Saint Petersburg, Russia
- Died: 9 December 2010 (aged 72)

Sport
- Sport: Modern pentathlon
- Club: Dynamo
Medal record
Representing the Soviet Union
World Championships
Gold medal – first place	1969 Budapest	Team
Silver medal – second place	1970 Warendorf	Team

Vyacheslav Aleksandrovich Belov (Russian: Вячеслав Александрович Белов; 25 February 1938 – 9 December 2010) was a Soviet modern pentathlon competitor, who won two team medals at the world championships of 1969–70. A Colonel with the Soviet Militsiya, he took part in the cleanup operation after the Chernobyl disaster. He was married to the Russian Olympic fencer Elena Belova.
