= Tamás Szombathelyi =

Hungarian modern pentathlete

Personal information
- Born: 1 May 1953 (age 73) Budapest, Hungary

Sport
- Sport: Modern pentathlon
Medal record
Men's modern pentathlon
Representing Hungary
Olympic Games
Silver medal – second place	1980 Moscow	Individual
Silver medal – second place	1980 Moscow	Team

Tamás Szombathelyi (born 1 May 1953) is a Hungarian former modern pentathlete. He competed at the 1980 Summer Olympics winning silver medals in the individual and team events.
