= András Balczó =

Hungarian modern pentathlete (born 1938)

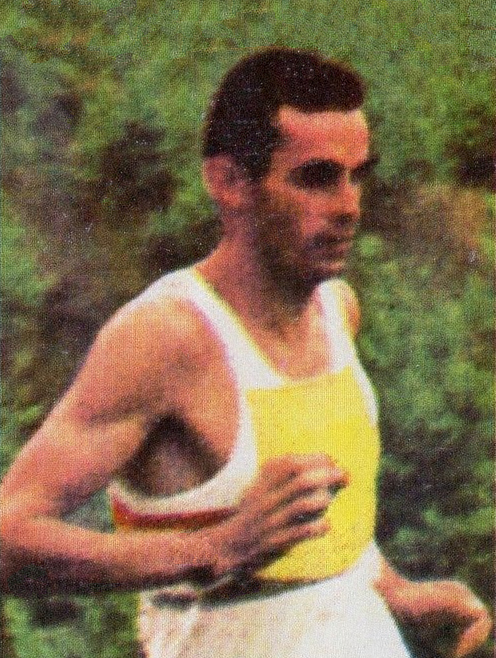

Personal information
- Born: 16 August 1938 (age 87) Kondoros, Hungary
- Height: 1.81 m (5 ft 11 in)
- Weight: 73 kg (161 lb)

Sport
- Sport: Modern pentathlon
- Club: Csepel SC, Budapest
Medal record
Representing Hungary
Olympic Games
Gold medal – first place	1960 Rome	Team
Gold medal – first place	1968 Mexico City	Team
Gold medal – first place	1972 Munich	Individual
Silver medal – second place	1968 Mexico City	Individual
Silver medal – second place	1972 Munich	Team
World championships
Gold medal – first place	1963 Evilard	Individual
Gold medal – first place	1963 Evilard	Team
Gold medal – first place	1965 Leipzig	Individual
Gold medal – first place	1965 Leipzig	Team
Gold medal – first place	1966 Melbourne	Individual
Gold medal – first place	1966 Melbourne	Team
Gold medal – first place	1967 Jönköping	Individual
Gold medal – first place	1967 Jönköping	Team
Gold medal – first place	1969 Budapest	Individual
Gold medal – first place	1970 Warendorf	Team
Silver medal – second place	1958 Aldershot	Team
Silver medal – second place	1959 Hershey	Individual
Silver medal – second place	1961 Moscow	Team
Silver medal – second place	1962 Mexico City	Team
Silver medal – second place	1969 Budapest	Team
Silver medal – second place	1970 Warendorf	Individual
Silver medal – second place	1971 San Antonio	Team
Bronze medal – third place	1961 Moscow	Individual
Bronze medal – third place	1971 San Antonio	Individual

András Balczó (born 16 August 1938) is a retired Hungarian modern pentathlete. He competed at the 1960, 1968 and 1972 Olympics in the individual and team events and won three gold and two silver medal; he missed only one medal, finishing fourth individually in 1960.

Balczó was elected Hungarian Sportsman of the Year 1966, 1969 and 1972, while the pentathlon team was several times chosen as the Hungarian Team of the Year. He was awarded the title of Merited Master of Sport of the USSR in 1972, along with eight other athletes from outside USSR.

He is considered one of the most successful athletes in the history of modern pentathlon. His wife Mónika Császár is a former Olympic gymnast.

Awards
Preceded by Gyula Zsivótzky	Hungarian Sportsman of The Year; 1966	Succeeded by István Kozma
Preceded by Gyula Zsivótzky	Hungarian Sportsman of The Year; 1969	Succeeded by Péter Kelemen
Preceded by Csaba Hegedűs	Hungarian Sportsman of The Year; 1972	Succeeded by Géza Csapó
