= Modern pentathlon at the 1976 Summer Olympics =

Men's modern pentathlon at the Games of the XXI Olympiad
- Dates: July 18–22, 1976
- Competitors: 47 from 17 nations

The modern pentathlon at the 1976 Summer Olympics was represented by two events (both for men): Individual competition and Team competition. As usual in Olympic modern pentathlon, one competition was held and each competitor's score was included to the Individual competition event results table and was also added to his teammates' scores to be included to the Team competition event results table. This competition consisted of 5 disciplines:

- Equestrian, held on July 18 at Bromont.
- Fencing, held on July 19 at Université de Montréal.
- Shooting, held on July 20 at L'Acadie.
- Swimming, held on July 21 at Montreal Olympic Pool
- Cross-country, held on July 22 at Olympic Stadium and Maisonneuve Park.

Boris Onischenko of the Soviet Union was ejected from the competition during the fencing event after it was discovered he had wired his épée with a concealed push button circuit breaker that enabled him to register a hit at any time. Onischenko's results were deleted from the records, and he was spirited away from the Olympic Village almost immediately, never competing in events outside the USSR again.

The other Soviet team members, Pavel Lednev and Boris Mosolov, were allowed to continue individually, but as three athletes are required to compete in a team event, it was ruled that their results would receive no score in the team competition.

== Participating nations ==
A total of 47 athletes from 17 nations competed at the Montreal Games:

- Australia (2)
- Bulgaria (3)
- Canada (3)
- Czechoslovakia (3)
- Denmark (2)
- Finland (3)
- France (3)
- Great Britain (3)
- Hungary (3)
- Italy (3)
- Japan (3)
- Poland (3)
- Soviet Union (3)
- Sweden (3)
- Switzerland (1)
- United States (3)
- West Germany (3)

== Medal summary ==
Event	Gold	Silver	Bronze
Individual	Janusz Pyciak-Peciak; Poland	Pavel Lednyov; Soviet Union	Jan Bártů; Czechoslovakia
Team	Great Britain; Jim Fox; Danny Nightingale; Adrian Parker	Czechoslovakia; Jan Bártů; Bohumil Starnovský; Jiří Adam	Hungary; Tamás Kancsal; Tibor Maracskó; Szvetiszláv Sasics

Individual scores: Men's Individual at the 1976 Summer Olympics

== Medal table ==
Rank	Nation	Gold	Silver	Bronze	Total
1	Great Britain	1	0	0	1
1	Poland	1	0	0	1
3	Czechoslovakia	0	1	1	2
4	Soviet Union	0	1	0	1
5	Hungary	0	0	1	1
Totals (5 entries)		2	2	2	6
