= Serge Bindy =

Swiss modern pentathlete

Personal information
- Born: 23 October 1954 (age 71)

Sport
- Sport: Modern pentathlon

Serge Bindy (born 23 October 1954) is a Swiss modern pentathlete. He competed at the 1976 Summer Olympics.
