= Modern pentathlon at the 1980 Summer Olympics =

Men's modern pentathlon at the Games of the XXII Olympiad
- Dates: July 20–24, 1980
- Competitors: 43 from 17 nations

The modern pentathlon at the 1980 Summer Olympics was represented by two events (both for men): Individual competition and Team competition. As usual in Olympic modern pentathlon one competition was held and each competitor's score was included to the Individual competition event results table and was also added to his teammates' scores to be included to the Team competition event results table. This competition consisted of 5 disciplines which were held in 4 venues:

1. Equestrian held on July 20 at the Trade Unions Equestrian Centre situated in the Bitsa forest park (southern part of Moscow)
2. Fencing held on July 21 at the Sports Palace of the Central Sports Club of the Army (north-western part of Moscow)
3. Shooting held on July 22 at the Dynamo Shooting Range in Mytishchi (north-eastern part of Moscow)
4. Swimming held on July 23 at the Swimming Pool of the Olympiski Sports Complex (central part of Moscow)
5. Cross-country held on July 24 at the Trade Unions Equestrian Centre

== Participating nations ==
A total of 43 athletes from 17 nations competed at the Moscow Games:

- Australia (1)
- Austria (2)
- Bulgaria (3)
- Czechoslovakia (3)
- Finland (3)
- France (3)
- Great Britain (3)
- Hungary (3)
- Ireland (3)
- Italy (1)
- Mexico (2)
- New Zealand (1)
- Poland (3)
- Romania (3)
- Soviet Union (3)
- Spain (3)
- Sweden (3)

== Medal summary ==
Event	Gold	Silver	Bronze
Individual	Anatoly Starostin; Soviet Union	Tamás Szombathelyi; Hungary	Pavel Lednev; Soviet Union
Team	Soviet Union; Anatoly Starostin; Pavel Lednev; Yevgeny Lipeyev	Hungary; Tamás Szombathelyi; Tibor Maracskó; László Horváth	Sweden; Svante Rasmuson; Lennart Pettersson; George Horvath

== Medal table ==
Rank	Nation	Gold	Silver	Bronze	Total
1	Soviet Union	2	0	1	3
2	Hungary	0	2	0	2
3	Sweden	0	0	1	1
Totals (3 entries)		2	2	2	6
