= Boris Mosolov =

Soviet modern pentathlete

Boris Anatolyevich Mosolov
Personal information
- Born: 20 June 1950 (age 76) Moscow, Russian SFSR, Soviet Union

Sport
- Sport: Modern pentathlon

Boris Anatolyevich Mosolov (born 20 May 1948) is a Soviet modern pentathlete, born in Moscow. He competed at the 1976 Summer Olympics.
