= Risto Hurme =

Finnish modern pentathlete

Personal information
- Born: 16 May 1950 (age 76) Turku, Finland

Sport
- Sport: Modern pentathlon, fencing
Medal record
Men's Modern Pentathlon
Representing Finland
Olympic Games
Bronze medal – third place	1972 Munich	Team

Risto Hurme (born 16 May 1950) is a Finnish modern pentathlete and fencer. He won a bronze medal in the team modern pentathlon event at the 1972 Summer Olympics.
