= Michael Burley =

American modern pentathlete (born 1953)

Personal information
- Born: January 27, 1953 (age 73) Columbus, Ohio, United States

Sport
- Sport: Modern pentathlon

Michael Burley (born January 27, 1953) is an American modern pentathlete. He competed at the 1976 Summer Olympics and qualified for the 1980 U.S. Olympic team but was unable to compete due to the U.S. Olympic Committee's boycott of the 1980 Summer Olympics in Moscow, Russia. He was one of 461 athletes to receive a Congressional Gold Medal many years later.
