= John Fitzgerald (pentathlete) =

American modern pentathlete (born 1948)

John David Fitzgerald
Personal information
- Born: July 16, 1948 (age 78) Chicago, Illinois, United States

Sport
- Sport: Modern pentathlon

John David Fitzgerald (born July 16, 1948 in Wilmette, Illinois, Chicago) is an American modern pentathlete who represented the United States at the 1972 and 1976 Summer Olympics. He also qualified for the 1980 U.S. Olympic team but was not able to compete due to the U.S. Olympic Committee's boycott of the 1980 Summer Olympics in Moscow, Russia. He was one of 461 athletes to receive a Congressional Gold Medal many years later.

From 1962 to 1966, Fitzgerald was a star swimmer at Loyola Academy in Wilmette, Illinois. In 1973, 1974, and 1980, he won the United States National Championship in the Pentathlon, and in 1971 and 1973 he won the National Championship in the Triathlon.

He is a member of the Chicagoland Sports Hall of Fame.
