= Krzysztof Trybusiewicz =

Polish modern pentathlete

Personal information
- Born: 30 January 1949 (age 77) Susz, Poland

Sport
- Sport: Modern pentathlon

Krzysztof Trybusiewicz (born 30 January 1949) is a Polish modern pentathlete. He competed at the 1976 Summer Olympics.
