= Szvetiszláv Sasics =

Hungarian modern pentathlete (1948–2025)

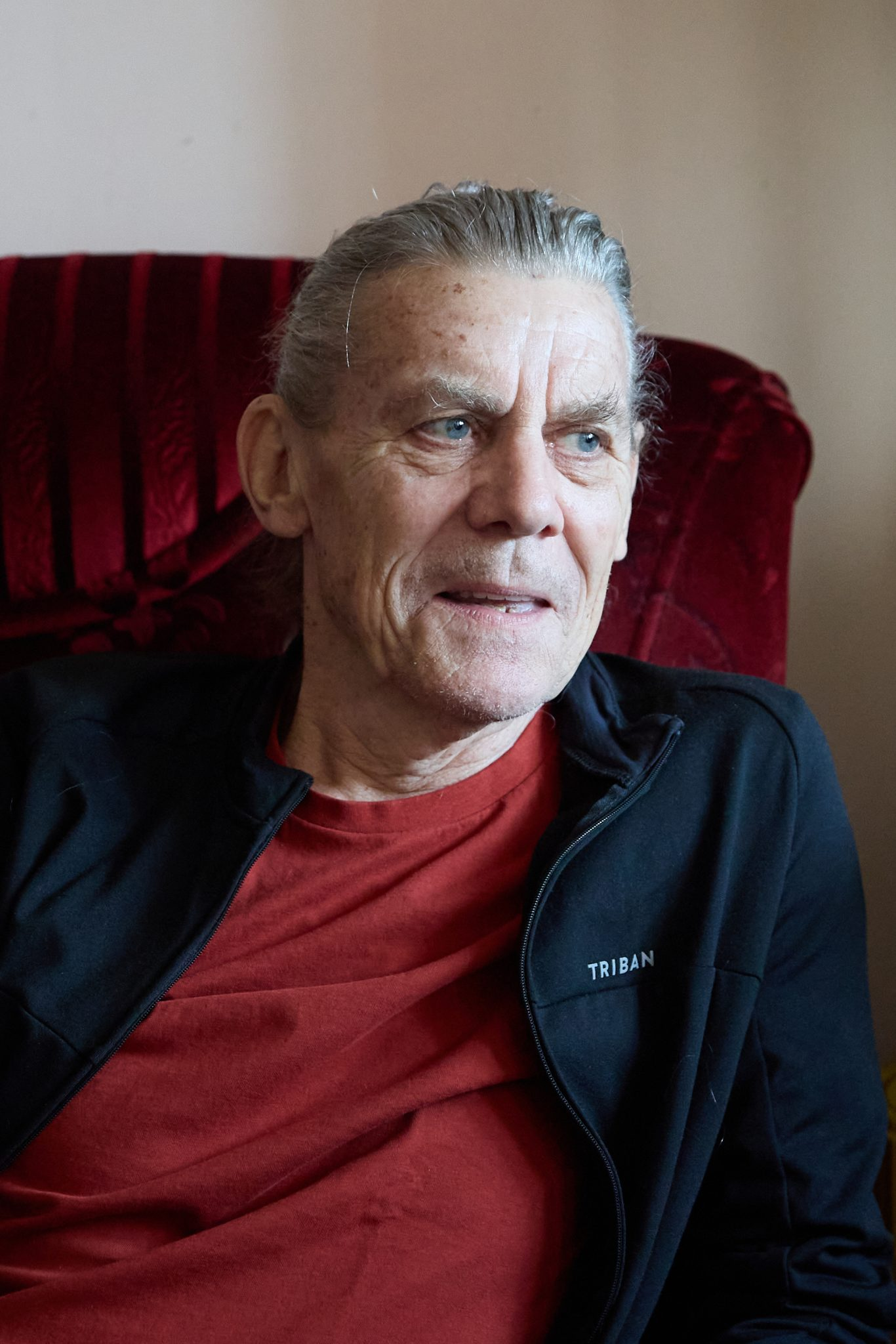

Personal information
- Born: 19 January 1948 Sátoraljaújhely, Hungary
- Died: 13 May 2025 (aged 77) Budapest, Hungary

Sport
- Sport: Modern pentathlon
Medal record
Men's modern pentathlon
Representing Hungary
Olympic Games
Bronze medal – third place	1976 Montreal	Team

Szvetiszláv Sasics (19 January 1948 – 13 May 2025) was a Hungarian modern pentathlete. He competed at the 1976 Summer Olympics winning a bronze medal in the team event.

Sasics died on 13 May 2025, at the age of 77.
