= Modern pentathlon at the 1972 Summer Olympics =

Men's modern pentathlon at the Games of the XX Olympiad
- Dates: August 27–31, 1972
- Competitors: 59 from 20 nations

The modern pentathlon at the 1972 Summer Olympics was represented by two events (both for men): Individual competition and Team competition. As usual in Olympic modern pentathlon, one competition was held and each competitor's score was included to the Individual competition event results table and was also added to his teammates' scores to be included to the Team competition event results table. This competition consisted of 5 disciplines:

- Equestrian, held on August 27
- Fencing, held on August 28
- Shooting, held on August 29
- Swimming, held on August 30
- Cross-country, held on August 31

== Medal summary ==
Event	Gold	Silver	Bronze
Individual	András Balczó; Hungary	Boris Onishchenko; Soviet Union	Pavel Lednyov; Soviet Union
Team	Soviet Union; Boris Onishchenko; Pavel Lednyov; Vladimir Shmelyov	Hungary; András Balczó; Zsigmond Villányi; Pál Bakó	Finland; Risto Hurme; Veikko Salminen; Martti Ketelä

Individual scores: Men's Individual at the 1972 Summer Olympics

== Medal table ==
Rank	Nation	Gold	Silver	Bronze	Total
1	Soviet Union	1	1	1	3
2	Hungary	1	1	0	2
3	Finland	0	0	1	1
Totals (3 entries)		2	2	2	6

== Participating nations ==
A total of 59 athletes from 20 nations competed at the Munich Games:

- Australia (2)
- Austria (3)
- Bulgaria (3)
- Canada (3)
- Denmark (3)
- Finland (3)
- France (3)
- Great Britain (3)
- Hungary (3)
- Italy (3)
- Japan (3)
- Mexico (3)
- Netherlands (3)
- Poland (3)
- Romania (3)
- Soviet Union (3)
- Sweden (3)
- Switzerland (3)
- United States (3)
- West Germany (3)
