= World Modern Pentathlon Championships =

International modern pentathlon competition

- Status: Active
- Genre: Sports Event
- Frequency: Annual
- Country: Varying
- Inaugurated: 1949
- Organiser: UIPM
- Member: 133 Nations
- Website: uipmworld.org

The UIPM World Modern Pentathlon Championships (for Seniors) is an annual global international competition in modern pentathlon. It was first held in 1949 under the organization of the International Modern Pentathlon Union (UIPM).

== History ==
The Modern Pentathlon World Championships is the highest international modern pentathlon competition. It has been held annually since 1949 under the organization of the International Union of Modern Pentathlon (UIPM). Until 1980 the championship was exclusively for men (Except 1978 World Modern Pentathlon Championships). The first women's contest was held in 1981, although at a different venue and date. Both contests, male and female, have been held since 1993 in parallel at the same venue.

== Editions ==
The years in which championships are held only for women or exclusive to the relay do not count in the official numbering of the UIPM (1984,1988,1992,1996).

Edition	Year	Host city	Host country	Events
1949–1979: Only for Men
1	1949	Stockholm	Sweden	2
2	1950	Bern	Switzerland	2
3	1951	Helsingborg	Sweden	2
4	1953	Santo Domingo	Chile	2
5	1954	Budapest	Hungary	2
6	1955	Zürich	Switzerland	2
7	1957	Stockholm	Sweden	2
8	1958	Aldershot	United Kingdom	2
9	1959	Hershey	United States	2
10	1961	Moscow	Soviet Union	2
11	1962	Mexico City	Mexico	2
12	1963	Magglingen	Switzerland	2
13	1965	Leipzig	East Germany	2
14	1966	Melbourne	Australia	2
15	1967	Jönköping	Sweden	2
16	1969	Budapest	Hungary	2
17	1970	Warendorf	West Germany	2
18	1971	San Antonio	United States	2
19	1973	London	United Kingdom	2
20	1974	Moscow	Soviet Union	2
21	1975	Mexico City	Mexico	2
22	1977	San Antonio	United States	2
23	1978	Jönköping	Sweden	4
24	1979	Budapest	Hungary	2
1981–1992: Men and Women in Separate Venue
25	1981	Zielona Góra – London	Poland – United Kingdom	4
26	1982	Rome – Compiègne	Italy – France	4
27	1983	Warendorf – Gothenburg	West Germany – Sweden	4
---	1984	Copenhagen	Denmark	2
28	1985	Melbourne – Montreal	Australia – Canada	4
29	1986	Montecatini Terme	Italy	4
30	1987	Moulins – Bensheim	France – West Germany	4
---	1988	Warsaw	Poland	2
31	1989	Budapest – Wiener Neustadt	Hungary – Austria	5
32	1990	Lahti – Linköping	Finland – Sweden	5
33	1991	San Antonio – Sydney	United States – Australia	6
---	1992	Winterthur – Budapest	Switzerland – Hungary	4
1993–2024: Men and Women in Same Venue
34	1993	Darmstadt	Germany	4
35	1994	Sheffield	United Kingdom	6
36	1995	Basel	Switzerland	6
---	1996	Rome – Siena	Italy	4
37	1997	Sofia	Bulgaria	6
38	1998	Mexico City	Mexico	6
39	1999	Budapest	Hungary	6
40	2000	Pesaro	Italy	6
41	2001	Millfield	United Kingdom	6
42	2002	San Francisco	United States	6
43	2003	Pesaro	Italy	6
44	2004	Moscow	Russia	6
45	2005	Warsaw	Poland	6
46	2006	Guatemala City	Guatemala	6
47	2007	Berlin	Germany	6
48	2008	Budapest	Hungary	6
49	2009	London	United Kingdom	6
50	2010	Chengdu	China	7
51	2011	Moscow	Russia	7
52	2012	Rome	Italy	7
53	2013	Kaohsiung	Taiwan	7
54	2014	Warsaw	Poland	7
55	2015	Berlin	Germany	7
56	2016	Moscow	Russia	7
57	2017	Cairo	Egypt	7
58	2018	Mexico City	Mexico	7
59	2019	Budapest	Hungary	7
-	2020	Cancún	Mexico	-
60	2021	Cairo	Egypt	7
61	2022	Alexandria	Egypt	7
62	2023	Bath	United Kingdom	7+5
63	2024	Zhengzhou	China	7+5
2025–Ongoing: Introduction of obstacle racing
64	2025	Kaunas	Lithuania	4
65	2026	Guiyang	China	7

== All-time medal table ==
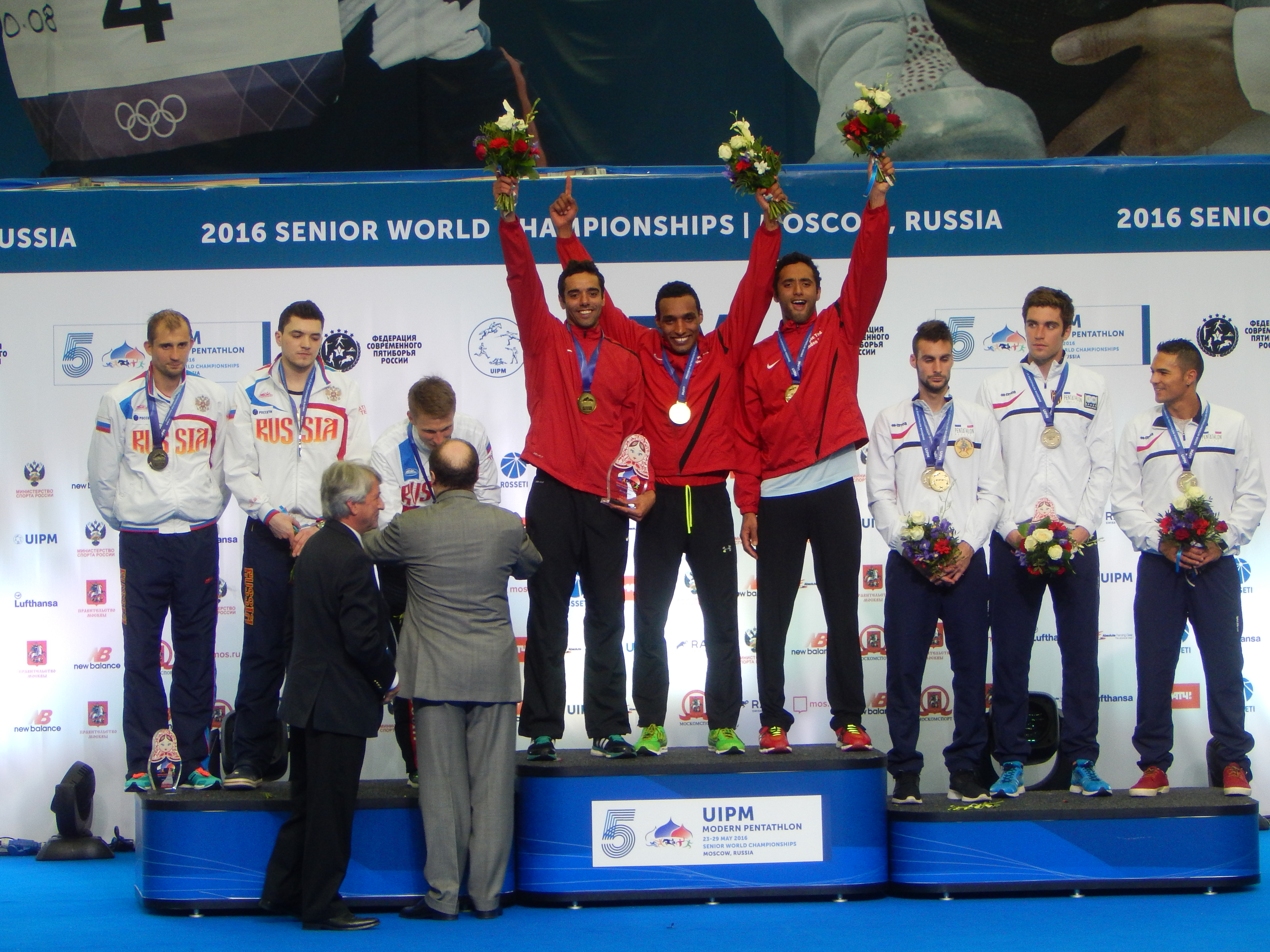
2016 World Modern Pentathlon Championships – Victory Ceremony Team Men

Updated after the 2025 World Modern Pentathlon Championships.

Rank	Nation	Gold	Silver	Bronze	Total
1	Hungary	59	53	39	151
2	Poland	34	16	21	71
3	Soviet Union	32	25	14	71
4	Great Britain	23	25	16	64
5	Russia	20	30	20	70
6	France	18	14	17	49
7	Germany	18	13	17	48
8	Italy	13	19	19	51
9	South Korea	13	9	12	34
10	Belarus	10	11	16	37
11	Egypt	10	8	7	25
12	Sweden	10	5	11	26
13	Lithuania	8	8	11	27
14	Czech Republic	5	10	15	30
15	China	5	9	7	21
16	United States	5	7	9	21
17	Ukraine	5	4	8	17
18	Denmark	5	1	3	9
19	Mexico	2	3	3	8
20	RMPF	1	2	0	3
21	Canada	1	0	1	2
22	Finland	0	9	3	12
23	West Germany	0	8	9	17
24	Switzerland	0	4	2	6
25	Czechoslovakia	0	1	4	5
26	Brazil	0	1	2	3
26	Latvia	0	1	2	3
28	Argentina	0	1	0	1
29	Bulgaria	0	0	2	2
29	East Germany	0	0	2	2
29	Guatemala	0	0	2	2
29	Romania	0	0	2	2
29	Turkey	0	0	2	2
34	Chile	0	0	1	1
34	Japan	0	0	1	1
34	Kazakhstan	0	0	1	1
Totals (36 entries)		297	297	301	895

== Other World Championships ==
- UIPM Biathle/Triathle World Championships
- UIPM Masters World Championships
- UIPM Tetrathlon U15 World Championships
- UIPM Pentathlon U17 World Championships
- UIPM Pentathlon U19 World Championships
- UIPM Pentathlon Youth World Championships
- UIPM Pentathlon Junior World Championships

== See also ==
- UIPM Biathle World Championships
- UIPM Triathle World Championships
- Modern pentathlon at the Summer Olympics
- List of Olympic medalists in modern pentathlon
