= Wolfgang Köpcke =

German modern pentathlete

Personal information
- Born: 27 February 1948 (age 78) Berlin, Germany

Sport
- Sport: Modern pentathlon

Wolfgang Köpcke (born 27 February 1948) is a German modern pentathlete. He competed for West Germany at the 1976 Summer Olympics, finishing in 41st place.
