= Zsigmond Villányi =

Hungarian modern pentathlete

Personal information
- Born: 1 January 1950 Hercegszántó, Hungary
- Died: 13 January 1995 (aged 45) Göd, Hungary

Sport
- Sport: Modern pentathlon
Medal record
Men's modern pentathlon
Representing Hungary
Olympic Games
Silver medal – second place	1972 Munich	Team

Zsigmond Villányi (1 January 1950 – 13 January 1995) was a Hungarian modern pentathlete. He competed at the 1972 Summer Olympics winning a silver medal in the team event.
