= Jiří Adam =

Czech fencer (born 1950)

Personal information
- Born: 12 October 1950 (age 75) Prague, Czechoslovakia

Sport
- Sport: Modern pentathlon, fencing
Medal record
Men's Modern pentathlon
Representing Czechoslovakia
Olympic Games
| Silver medal – second place | 1976 Montréal | Team |

Jiří Adam (born 12 October 1950) is a Czech modern pentathlete and épée fencer. He won a silver medal in the team modern pentathlon event at the 1976 Summer Olympics and finished in 29th place in the individual event.
