= Jan Bártů =

Czech modern pentathlete (born 1955)

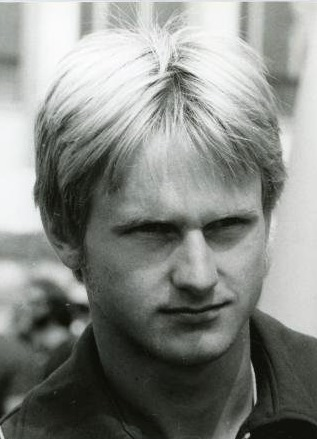

Personal information
- Born: 16 January 1955 (age 71) Prague, Czechoslovakia

Sport
- Sport: Modern pentathlon
- Coached by: Karel Bártů

Achievements and titles
- Olympic finals: 2 (1976, 1980)
Medal record
Men's modern pentathlon
Representing Czechoslovakia
Olympic Games
Silver medal – second place	1976 Montreal	Team
Bronze medal – third place	1976 Montreal	Individual

Jan Bártů (born 16 January 1955) is a Czech former modern pentathlete and coach who competed in the 1976 Summer Olympics and in the 1980 Summer Olympics. He won an individual bronze and a team silver at the 1976 Summer Games. He was coached by his father Karel Bártů, who competed for Czechoslovakia in modern pentathlon at the 1948 Summer Olympics. Jan secured his place at the 1976 Olympic Games at the age of 21 by finishing fourth in the 1976 Hungarian World Cup. He also finished second in the 1976 World Junior Championships, a few weeks after the Olympics. The success of Bártů and his team-mates at the Games represented the first major success in Modern Pentathlon for Czechoslovakia.

After retiring from competition, Jan Bártů went into coaching, serving as a coach at the High Performance Sport Centre Sparta Prague and later as the Technical Director of Czechoslovak Pentathlon from 1986 to 1990, before becoming head coach for the Mexican National Modern Pentathlon team between 1990 and 1994. He took over the Head Coach position of the United States Pentathlon Association from 1995 to 1998. In April 1998 he joined Pentathlon GB as Performance Director: as of 2017 he led the British Team to winning five Olympic medals, including a gold for Steph Cook at the 2000 Olympics.

Bártů was awarded an honorary doctorate by the University of Bath in March 2017.
