= László Horváth (modern pentathlete) =

Hungarian modern pentathlete (1946–2025)

Personal information
- Born: 21 April 1946 Csorna, Hungary
- Died: 3 July 2025 (aged 79)

Sport
- Sport: Modern pentathlon
Medal record
Men's modern pentathlon
Representing Hungary
Olympic Games
| Silver medal – second place | 1980 Moskva | Team |

László Horváth (21 April 1946 – 3 July 2025) was a Hungarian modern pentathlete. He competed at the 1980 Summer Olympics, winning a silver medal in the team event. He died on 3 July 2025, at the age of 79.
