= Adrian Parker =

British modern pentathlete (born 1951)

Personal information
- Born: 2 March 1951 (age 75) Croydon, London, England

Sport
- Sport: Modern pentathlon
Medal record
Men's modern pentathlon
Representing United Kingdom
Olympic Games
| Gold medal – first place | 1976 Montreal | Team |

Adrian Parker (born 2 March 1951) is a British modern pentathlete and Olympic champion.

He won a team gold medal in the modern pentathlon at the 1976 Summer Olympics in Montreal, with Danny Nightingale and Jim Fox. He finished 5th in individual modern pentathlon at the 1976 Olympics. Parker won the final event, the cross-country, with an "outstanding run", which helped Britain to win the gold medal. Parker had been the British pentathlon champion in 1975.
