= 1971 World Modern Pentathlon Championships =

The 1971 World Modern Pentathlon Championships were held in San Antonio, Texas, United States from October 11 – 14, 1971.

== Medal table ==
Rank	Nation	Gold	Silver	Bronze	Total
1	Soviet Union (URS)	2	0	0	2
2	Hungary (HUN)	0	2	1	3
3	United States (USA)	0	0	1	1
Totals (3 entries)		2	2	2	6

== See also ==
- World Modern Pentathlon Championship
