= Bohumil Starnovský =

Czech modern pentathlete

Personal information
- Born: 3 October 1953 (age 72) Prague, Czechoslovakia

Sport
- Sport: Modern pentathlon
Medal record
Men's modern pentathlon
Representing Czechoslovakia
Olympic Games
Silver medal – second place	1976 Montreal	Team

Bohumil Starnovský (born 3 October 1953) is a Czech former modern pentathlete who competed in the 1976 Summer Olympics and in the 1980 Summer Olympics. He won a silver medal in the team event in 1976. He has been devoting his time since the 90's to improving the Equestrian sport in the Czech Republic.
