= Gerhard Werner (pentathlete) =

Modern pentathlete

Personal information
- Born: 4 March 1947 (age 79) Oldenburg, Germany

Sport
- Sport: Modern pentathlon

Gerhard Werner (born 4 March 1947) is a German modern pentathlete. He competed for West Germany at the 1976 Summer Olympics.
