= Danny Nightingale (pentathlete) =

British modern pentathlete

Personal information
- Born: Robert Daniel Nightingale; 21 May 1954 (age 72) Redruth, Cornwall, England

Sport
- Sport: Modern pentathlon
Medal record
Men's modern pentathlon
Representing United Kingdom
Olympic Games
Gold medal – first place	1976 Montreal	Team

Robert Daniel "Danny" Nightingale (born 21 May 1954) is a British modern pentathlete and Olympic champion.

He won a team gold medal in the modern pentathlon at the 1976 Summer Olympics in Montreal, with Adrian Parker and Jim Fox.

Nightingale was the British pentathlon champion in 1976, 1977, and 1978. He later became the Development Officer for the Modern Pentathlon Association.

Nightingale used to work as a PE teacher at Rye Hills secondary school.
