= Zbigniew Pacelt =

Polish sportsman (1951–2021)

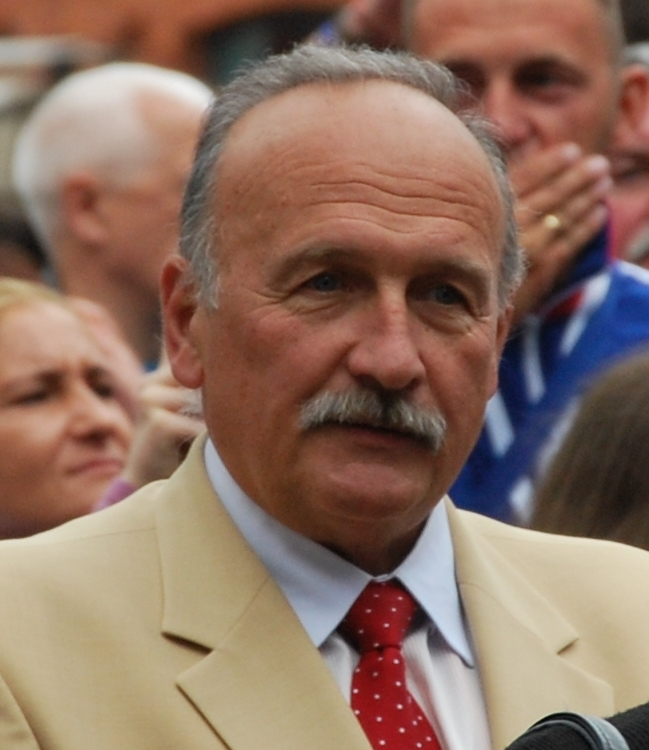
- Pacelt in 2013

Member of the Sejm
- Incumbent
- Assumed office 25 September 2005
- Constituency: 33 – Kielce

Personal details
- Born: 26 August 1951 Ostrowiec Świętokrzyski, Poland
- Died: 4 October 2021 (aged 70)
- Party: Civic Platform

Zbigniew Pacelt (26 August 1951 – 4 October 2021) was a Polish sportsman (swimmer, modern pentathlete), Olympian, coach, sport official, and politician. He competed as a swimmer at the 1968 and 1972 Summer Olympics, and as a modern pentathlete at the 1976 Summer Olympics.

Pacelt was born in Ostrowiec Świętokrzyski. He was elected to the Sejm on 25 September 2005, with 3,982 votes in 33 Kielce district as a candidate from the Civic Platform list.

For his sporting efforts he was awarded the Golden Cross of Merit and Officer's Cross of the Order of Polonia Restituta. He was awarded the title of "Honorary Citizen of Ostrowiec" in 2009.

== See also ==
- Members of Polish Sejm 2005-2007
