= Anatoli Starostin =

Soviet modern pentathlete

Personal information
- Born: 18 January 1960 (age 66) Dushanbe, Tajik SSR, Soviet Union

Sport
- Sport: Modern pentathlon
Medal record
Men's modern pentathlon
Representing Soviet Union
Olympic Games
Gold medal – first place	1980 Moscow	Individual
Gold medal – first place	1980 Moscow	Team
Representing Unified Team
Silver medal – second place	1992 Barcelona	Team

Anatoli Starostin (born 18 January 1960) is a former Soviet modern pentathlete and Olympic champion.

== Olympics ==
Starostin competed for the Soviet Union at the 1980 Summer Olympics in Moscow, where he won an individual gold medal, and a team gold medal with the Soviet team. He won a team silver medal with the Unified team at the 1992 Summer Olympics in Barcelona.
