= Pál Bakó =

Hungarian modern pentathlete (born 1946)

Personal information
- Born: 8 June 1946 (age 80) Budapest, Hungary

Sport
- Sport: Modern pentathlon
Medal record
Men's modern pentathlon
Representing Hungary
Olympic Games
Silver medal – second place	1972 Munich	Team

Pál Bakó (born 8 June 1946) is a Hungarian former modern pentathlete. He competed at the 1972 Summer Olympics winning a silver medal in the team event.
