= Jim Fox (pentathlete) =

British modern pentathlete (1941–2023)

Jim Fox OBE
Personal information
- Born: 19 September 1941 Pewsey, Wiltshire, England
- Died: 28 April 2023 (aged 81)

Sport
- Sport: Modern pentathlon
Medal record
Men's modern pentathlon
Representing Great Britain
Olympic Games
Gold medal – first place	1976 Montreal	Team

Jeremy Robert "Jim" Fox OBE (19 September 1941 – 28 April 2023) was a British modern pentathlete and Olympic champion.

== Career ==
Fox was one of the most influential figures in the development of the Modern Pentathlon in Britain. He won the British title a record ten times and is the only British pentathlete to have competed in four Olympic Games. His fourth place in the individual event at Munich in 1972 was the best placing by a Briton up to that time. It was only subsequently matched by Richard Phelps at Los Angeles 1984, and surpassed in 2021 by Joe Choong who won gold at Tokyo 2020. Fox made his Olympic début in 1964, when he placed 29th in the individual event, and in his second Olympic appearance in 1968 he improved to finish eighth.

After the 1968 Games, Fox, then a sergeant in the Royal Electrical and Mechanical Engineers (REME), announced his retirement but he was dissuaded by his coach, Ron Bright, and remained in the sport for another eight years. During that period he set a fine example to the tyros of the sport and following his final individual effort at the 1972 Olympics he won a team gold medal in Modern Pentathlon at the 1976 Summer Olympics in Montreal, with Danny Nightingale and Adrian Parker.

He was promoted to 2nd Lieutenant in 1972 and to Lieutenant in 1974.

=== 1976 Olympics ===
At the 1976 Olympics, after the first event of the pentathlon, the 1972 Olympics gold medal Soviet team found itself in fourth place, trailing closely behind Britain. Fencing was the next event, and during Fox's bout with Boris Onishchenko, the British team protested that Onishchenko's weapon had gone off without actually hitting anything. In fact, Onishchenko's épée was in the air away from Fox when the hit was registered.

Fox requested an examination of Onishchenko's weapon, which was found to be faulty, resulting in points being deducted from Onishchenko's score. However, the British team filed an official protest and demanded further examination. The bout was allowed to continue, and he won by a large margin.

In electric épée fencing, a touch is registered on the scoring box when the tip of the weapon is depressed with a force of 750 grams, completing a circuit formed by the weapon, body cord, and box. It was found that Onischenko's épée had been illegally modified to include a switch that allowed him to close this circuit without actually depressing the tip of his weapon, so he could register a touch without making any contact on his opponent. Onischenko was ejected from the competition, which forced the Soviet Union to scratch from the team event. The British team that exposed Onishchenko went on to win the gold medal.

Fox, who was later commissioned as a captain in the REME, was appointed Member of the Order of the British Empire (MBE) in the 1974 New Year Honours, and promoted to Officer of the Order of the British Empire (OBE) in the 2000 Birthday Honours, on both occasions for services to modern pentathlon.

Fox died on 28 April 2023, at the age of 81.
