= Vladimir Shmelyov =

Soviet modern pentathlete (1946–2023)

Personal information
- Born: 31 August 1946 Magadan, Khabarovsk Krai, Russian SFSR, USSR
- Died: 14 June 2023 (aged 76) Moscow Oblast, Russia

Sport
- Sport: Modern pentathlon
Medal record
Men's modern pentathlon
Representing Soviet Union
Olympic Games
Gold medal – first place	1972 Münich	Team

Vladimir Konstantinovich Shmelyov (Russian: Владимир Константинович Шмелёв31 August 1946 – 14 June 2023) was a Soviet modern pentathlete and Olympic Champion. He competed at the 1972 Summer Olympics in Munich, where he won a gold medal in the team competition (together with Boris Onishchenko and Pavel Lednyov), and placed fifth in the individual competition.

Shmelyov died on 14 June 2023, at the age of 76.
