= Tamás Kancsal =

Hungarian modern pentathlete (born 1951)

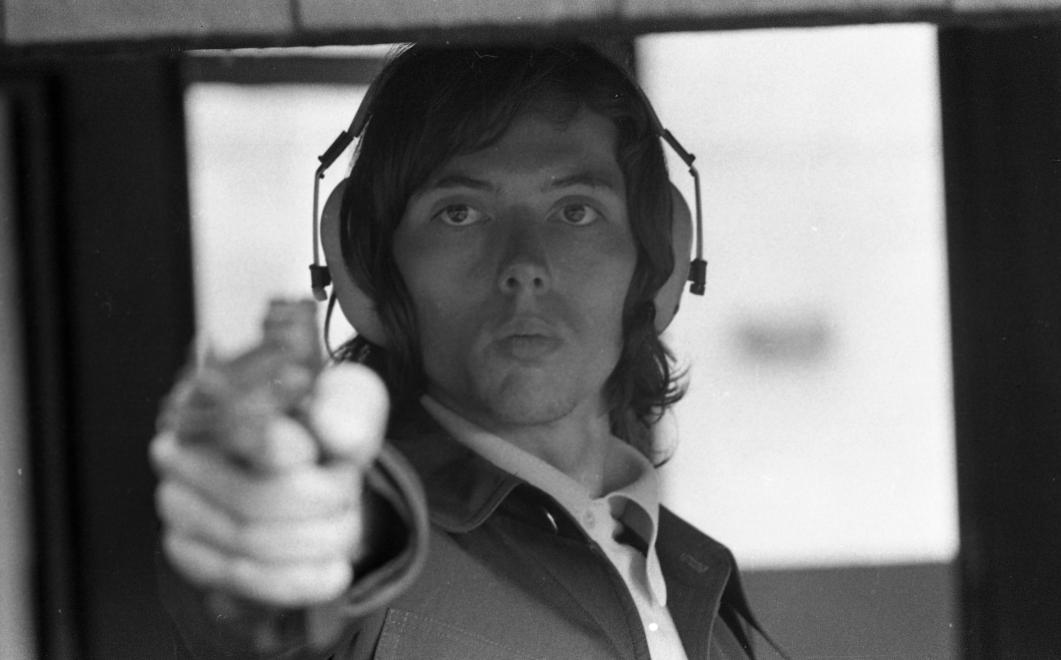
- Tamás Kancsal in 1974

Personal information
- Born: 17 October 1951 (age 74) Budapest, Hungary

Sport
- Sport: Modern pentathlon
Medal record
Men's modern pentathlon
Representing Hungary
Olympic Games
Bronze medal – third place	1976 Montreal	Team

Tamás Kancsal (born 17 October 1951) is a Hungarian former modern pentathlete. He competed at the 1976 Summer Olympics winning a bronze medal in the team event.
