= Stasys Šaparnis =

Lithuanian modern pentathlete

Personal information
- Born: 2 October 1939 (age 86) Panevėžys, Lithuania

Sport
- Sport: Modern pentathlon
Medal record
Men's modern pentathlon
Representing Soviet Union
Olympic Games
Silver medal – second place	1968 Mexico City	Team

Stasys Šaparnis (born 2 October 1939) is a former Lithuanian modern pentathlete and Olympic medalist. He competed at the 1968 Summer Olympics in Mexico City, where he won a silver medal in the team competition, and placed ninth in the individual competition.
