= Janusz Pyciak-Peciak =

Polish modern pentathlete

Personal information
- Born: 9 February 1949 (age 77) Warsaw, Poland

Sport
- Sport: Modern pentathlon
Medal record
Men's modern pentathlon
Representing Poland
Olympic Games
| Gold medal – first place | 1976 Montreal | Individual |
World championships
| Gold medal – first place | 1977 San Antonio | Individual |
| Gold medal – first place | 1977 San Antonio | Team |
| Gold medal – first place | 1978 Jönköping | Team |
| Gold medal – first place | 1981 Zielona Góra | Individual |
| Gold medal – first place | 1981 Zielona Góra | Team |
| Silver medal – second place | 1978 Jönköping | Individual |
| Silver medal – second place | 1979 Budapest | Individual |

Janusz Gerard Pyciak-Peciak (born 9 February 1949) is a Polish modern pentathlete, Olympic champion and several times world champion.

== Olympics ==
Pyciak-Peciak competed at the 1972 Summer Olympics. Four years later at the 1976 Summer Olympics in Montreal, he won an individual gold medal. He finished 6th at the 1980 Summer Olympics, and the Polish team finished 4th.

== World championships ==
Pyciak-Peciak became individual world champion in 1977 and in 1981, and received silver medals in 1978 and 1979. He won the title three times with the Polish team, in 1977, 1978 and 1981.

== Awards ==
Pyciak-Peciak was elected Polish Sportspersonality of the Year 1977, and again in 1981.
