= Tibor Maracskó =

Hungarian modern pentathlete

Personal information
- Born: 8 September 1948 (age 77) Székesfehérvár, Hungary

Sport
- Sport: Modern pentathlon
Medal record
Men's modern pentathlon
Representing Hungary
Olympic Games
Silver medal – second place	1980 Moscow	Team
Bronze medal – third place	1976 Montreal	Team

Tibor Maracskó (born 8 September 1948) is a Hungarian former modern pentathlete who competed in the 1976 Summer Olympics and in the 1980 Summer Olympics. In 1976, he won a bronze medal in the team event and in 1980, he won a silver medal in same event.
