= Modern pentathlon at the 1968 Summer Olympics – Men's team =

Pentathlon event at the Summer Olympics

Men's team modern pentathlon at the Games of the XIX Olympiad
- Venue: Campo Militar 1; Fernando Montes de Oca Fencing Hall; Alberca Olímpica Francisco Márquez; Vicente Suárez Shooting Range
- Dates: October 13–17
- Competitors: 45 from 15 nations

Medalists
1st place, gold medalist(s)		András Balczó; István Móna; Ferenc Török	Hungary
2nd place, silver medalist(s)		Pavel Lednyov; Boris Onishchenko; Stasys Šaparnis	Soviet Union
3rd place, bronze medalist(s)		Jean-Pierre Giudicelli; Raoul Gueguen; Lucien Guiguet	France

The men's team modern pentathlon event was a multi-sport combined event at the 1968 Summer Olympics. It was the 5th consecutive Games at which the team event was held after being introduced in 1952. The competition involved riding, fencing, shooting, swimming, and running. The scores from the individual competition were used for the team score; there was no separate competition.

The event resulted in the first Olympic competitor being disqualified for doping. Hans-Gunnar Liljenwall was disqualified for alcohol use after drinking beer before the shooting phase.

== Results ==
Rank	Nation	Pentathlete	Riding	Fencing	Shooting	Swimming	Running	Total	Team score
1st place, gold medalist(s)	Hungary	András Balczó	1010	1000	934	1054	1024	5022	14325
1st place, gold medalist(s)	Hungary	István Móna	1010	1078	868	943	847	4746	14325
1st place, gold medalist(s)	Hungary	Ferenc Török	920	1052	912	880	793	4557	14325
2nd place, silver medalist(s)	Soviet Union	Boris Onishchenko	995	948	912	1054	910	4819	14248
2nd place, silver medalist(s)	Soviet Union	Pavel Lednyov	1070	844	934	1060	892	4800	14248
2nd place, silver medalist(s)	Soviet Union	Stasys Šaparnis	1070	766	802	1027	964	4629	14248
3rd place, bronze medalist(s)	France	Raoul Gueguen	1040	974	912	1000	850	4776	13289
3rd place, bronze medalist(s)	France	Lucien Guiguet	1035	688	824	958	934	4439	13289
3rd place, bronze medalist(s)	France	Jean-Pierre Giudicelli	780	506	890	973	925	4074	13289
4	United States	James Moore	1040	766	912	931	937	4586	13280
4	United States	Robert Beck	1010	896	912	925	655	4398	13280
4	United States	Maurice Lough	980	662	846	988	820	4296	13280
5	Finland	Martti Ketela	1010	896	846	964	856	4572	13238
5	Finland	Seppo Aho	1100	922	692	940	880	4534	13238
5	Finland	Jorma Hotanen	780	740	846	895	871	4132	13238
6	East Germany	Karl-Heinz Kutschke	1070	610	846	1126	1090	4742	13167
6	East Germany	Jörg Tscherner	1050	792	846	1060	766	4514	13167
6	East Germany	Wolfgang Luderitz	365	792	934	907	913	3911	13167
7	Japan	Yuso Makihira	1040	818	802	898	973	4531	13083
7	Japan	Katsuaki Tashiro	1100	714	934	931	676	4355	13083
7	Japan	Toshio Fukui	840	896	692	967	802	4197	13083
8	Great Britain	Jeremy Fox	1010	844	890	1006	895	4645	12893
8	Great Britain	Barry Lillywhite	985	792	802	982	700	4261	12893
8	Great Britain	Robert Phelps	795	688	978	964	562	3987	12893
9	Italy	Mario Medda	1010	948	758	949	937	4602	12601
9	Italy	Giancarlo Morresi	790	766	1022	1051	703	4332	12601
9	Italy	Nicolo Deligia	460	688	780	889	850	3667	12601
10	Mexico	Eduardo Olivera	1070	766	868	997	769	4470	12414
10	Mexico	David Bárcena	1010	506	890	982	952	4340	12414
10	Mexico	Eduard Tovar	805	532	648	889	730	3604	12414
11	Bulgaria	Antone Paniowsky	950	740	978	892	703	4263	11976
11	Bulgaria	Konstantine Sardjev	1100	662	868	757	811	4198	11976
11	Bulgaria	Ivan Apostolov	720	662	538	880	715	3515	11976
12	Australia	Peter Macken	935	636	802	910	982	4265	11959
12	Australia	Duncan Page	1035	558	846	880	580	3899	11959
12	Australia	Donald McMikin	545	714	1022	835	679	3795	11959
13	West Germany	Elmar Frings	1070	818	846	955	796	4485	11834
13	West Germany	Heiner Thade	910	948	956	877	613	4304	11834
13	West Germany	Hans Todt	ELI	714	736	865	730	3045	11834
–	Austria	Wolf-Dieter Sonnleitner	1010	688	912	916	832	4442	DNF
–	Austria	Siegfried Springer	1030	870	846	883	718	4347	DNF
–	Austria	Wolfgang Leu	980	766	670	DNF	DNF	DNF	DNF
–	Sweden	Björn Ferm	1100	896	DSQ	DSQ	DSQ	DSQ	DSQ
–	Sweden	Hans Jacobson	1025	1000	DSQ	DSQ	DSQ	DSQ	DSQ
–	Sweden	Hans-Gunnar Liljenwall	1010	922	DSQ	DSQ	DSQ	DSQ	DSQ
