= 1968 Summer Olympics medal table =

1968 Summer Olympics medals
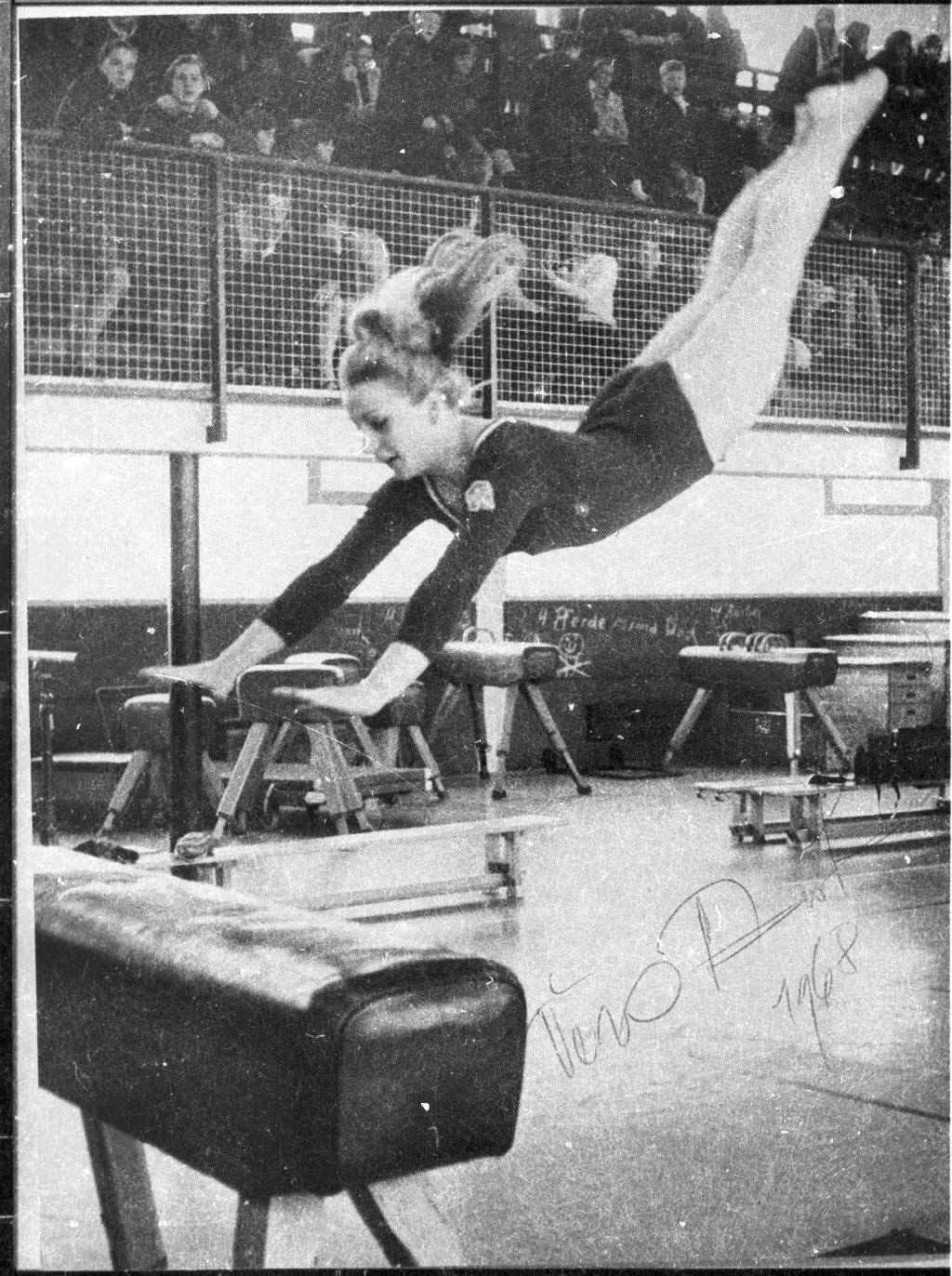
- Věra Čáslavská of Czechoslovakia was the most successful competitor at the games, winning four gold and two silver medals in artistic gymnastics
- Location: Mexico City, Mexico

Highlights
- Most gold medals: United States (45)
- Most total medals: United States (107)
- Medalling NOCs: 44

World map showing the medal achievements of each country during the 1968 Summer Olympics Legend: represents countries that won at least one gold medal. represents countries that won at least one silver medal but no gold medals. represents countries that won at least one bronze medal (no gold or silver). represents participating countries that did not win medals. represents entities that did not participate at the 1968 Summer Olympics.

The 1968 Summer Olympics, officially known as the Games of the XIX Olympiad, were an international multi-sport event held in Mexico City, from 12 to 27 October. A total of 5,516 athletes from 112 nations participated in 172 events in 18 sports across 24 different disciplines. These were the first games to be held in Latin America.

Overall, athletes from 44 nations received at least one medal, and 39 nations won at least one gold medal. Athletes from the United States won the most gold medals, with 45, and the most medals overall, with 107. Teams from East Germany and West Germany won their nations' first Summer Olympic medals of every color at their first Summer Olympic appearance. Teams from Kenya, Tunisia, and Venezuela won their nations' first Olympic gold medals, while athletes from Cameroon, Mongolia, and Uganda won their nations' first Olympic medals.

Artistic gymnast Věra Čáslavská of Czechoslovakia was the most successful competitor at the games, winning six medals (four gold and two silver), and became famous for calling out the Soviet Union's invasion of her country at great personal risk. After her gold medal wins at these games, Čáslavská held the record for the most individual Olympic gold medals by a female athlete with seven, until Katie Ledecky surpassed it at the 2024 Summer Olympics with eight. Artistic gymnast Mikhail Voronin of the Soviet Union won the most total medals at the games with seven (two golds, four silvers, and one bronze).

== Medal table ==
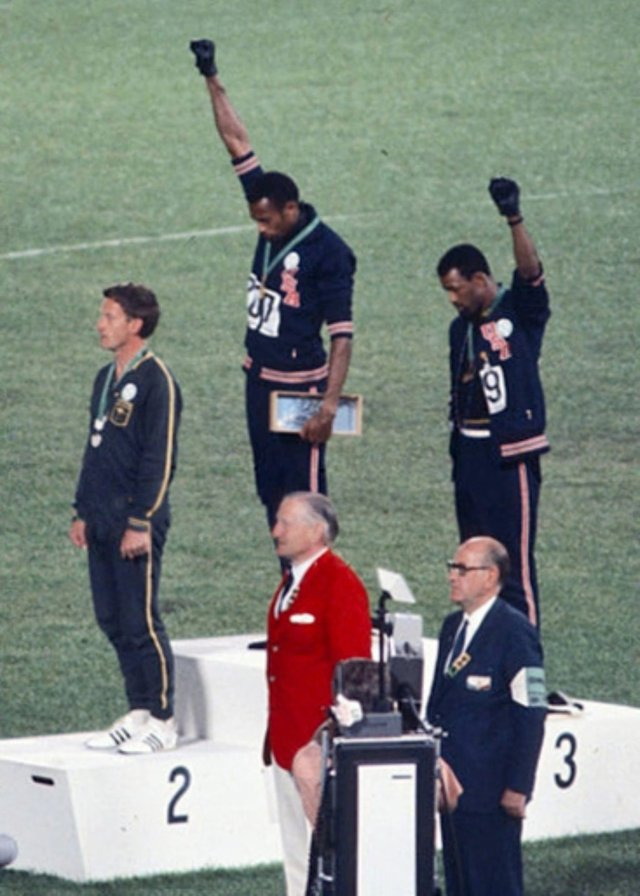
From left to right: Peter Norman, Tommie Smith, and John Carlos won silver, gold, and bronze respectively during the men's 200 metres event.

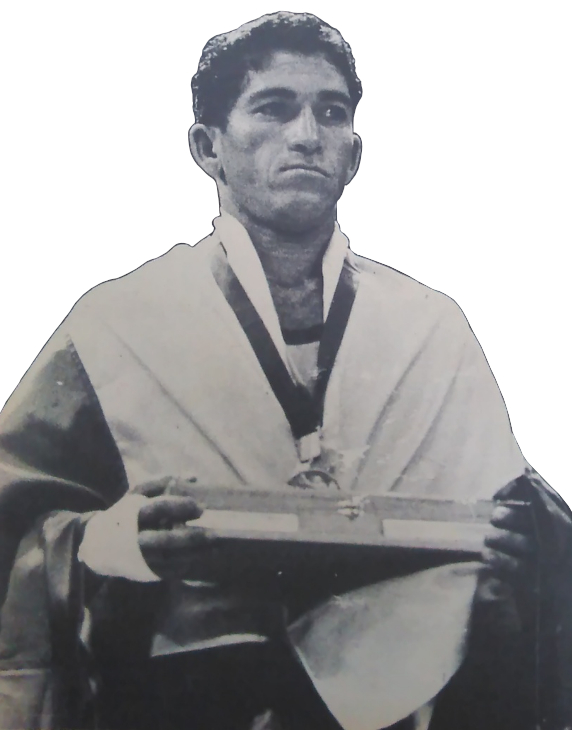
Boxer Francisco Rodríguez, the first-ever Olympic gold medalist for Venezuela

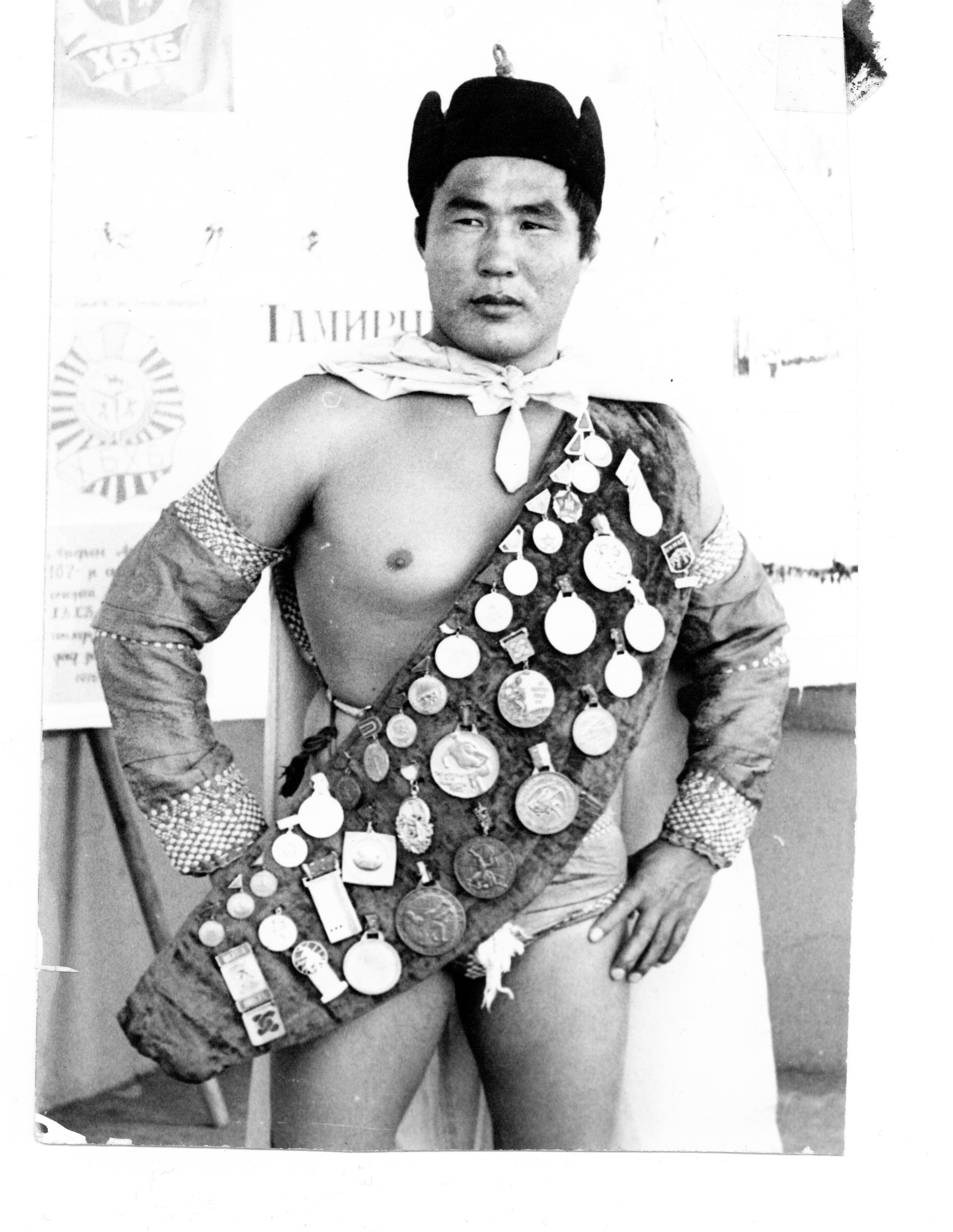
Wrestler Tömöriin Artag, one of the first Olympic medalists for Mongolia

The medal table is based on information provided by the International Olympic Committee (IOC) and is consistent with IOC conventional sorting in its published medal tables. The table uses the Olympic medal table sorting method. By default, the table is ordered by the number of gold medals the athletes from a nation have won. The number of silver medals is taken into consideration next and then the number of bronze medals. Two bronze medals were awarded in each boxing event to the losing semi-finalists, as opposed to them fighting in a third place tiebreaker.

In gymnastics, two gold medals (and no silver medal) were awarded in the men's horizontal bar and women's floor exercise due to a first-place tie in both events.

* Host nation (Mexico)

1968 Summer Olympics medal table
Rank	Nation	Gold	Silver	Bronze	Total
1	United States	45	28	34	107
2	Soviet Union	29	32	30	91
3	Japan	11	7	7	25
4	Hungary	10	10	12	32
5	East Germany	9	9	7	25
6	France	7	3	5	15
7	Czechoslovakia	7	2	4	13
8	West Germany	5	11	10	26
9	Australia	5	7	5	17
10	Great Britain	5	5	3	13
11	Poland	5	2	11	18
12	Romania	4	6	5	15
13	Italy	3	4	9	16
14	Kenya	3	4	2	9
15	Mexico*	3	3	3	9
16	Yugoslavia	3	3	2	8
17	Netherlands	3	3	1	7
18	Bulgaria	2	4	3	9
19	Iran	2	1	2	5
20	Sweden	2	1	1	4
21	Turkey	2	0	0	2
22	Denmark	1	4	3	8
23	Canada	1	3	1	5
24	Finland	1	2	1	4
25	Ethiopia	1	1	0	2
25	Norway	1	1	0	2
27	New Zealand	1	0	2	3
28	Tunisia	1	0	1	2
29	Pakistan	1	0	0	1
29	Venezuela	1	0	0	1
31	Cuba	0	4	0	4
32	Austria	0	2	2	4
33	Switzerland	0	1	4	5
34	Mongolia	0	1	3	4
35	Brazil	0	1	2	3
36	Belgium	0	1	1	2
36	South Korea	0	1	1	2
36	Uganda	0	1	1	2
39	Cameroon	0	1	0	1
39	Jamaica	0	1	0	1
41	Argentina	0	0	2	2
42	Greece	0	0	1	1
42	India	0	0	1	1
42	Taiwan	0	0	1	1
Totals (44 entries)		174	170	183	527

== Changes in medal standings ==
Key

※ Disqualified athlete(s)

List of official changes in medal standings
Ruling date	Sport/Event	Athlete (NOC)	1st place, gold medalist(s)	2nd place, silver medalist(s)	3rd place, bronze medalist(s)	Total	Notes
1968	Modern pentathlon Men's team	Sweden Björn Ferm ※ Hans Jacobson ※ Hans-Gunnar Liljenwall ※			−1	−1	Following the introduction of anti-doping regulations by the International Olympic Committee in 1967, these Olympics saw the first disqualification for drug use in the Olympic Games. Modern pentathlete Hans-Gunnar Liljenwall was reported to have drunk beers beforehand to calm down his nerves before the pistol shooting event. He and the rest of his team were disqualified after he tested positive for excessive alcohol consumption and had to give the bronze medals they had won to the French team.
1968	Modern pentathlon Men's team	France Raoul Gueguen; Lucien Guiguet; Jean-Pierre Giudicelli			+1	+1	Following the introduction of anti-doping regulations by the International Olympic Committee in 1967, these Olympics saw the first disqualification for drug use in the Olympic Games. Modern pentathlete Hans-Gunnar Liljenwall was reported to have drunk beers beforehand to calm down his nerves before the pistol shooting event. He and the rest of his team were disqualified after he tested positive for excessive alcohol consumption and had to give the bronze medals they had won to the French team.

List of official changes by country
NOC	Gold	Silver	Bronze	Net Change
Sweden	0	0	−1	−1
France	0	0	+1	+1
