= List of Olympic venues in modern pentathlon =

For the Summer Olympics, there are 88 venues that have been or will be used for modern pentathlon.

Games	Venue	Other sports hosted at venues for those games	Capacity	Ref.
1912 Stockholm	Barkarby (riding)	None	Not listed.	
1912 Stockholm	Djurgårdsbrunnsviken (swimming)	Diving, Rowing, Swimming, Water polo	Not listed.	
1912 Stockholm	Kaknäs (shooting)	None	Not listed.	
1912 Stockholm	Östermalm Athletic Grounds (fencing)	Equestrian, Fencing, Tennis	Not listed.	
1912 Stockholm	Stockholm Olympic Stadium (running)	Athletics, Equestrian, Football (final), Gymnastics, Tug of war, Wrestling	33,000.	
1920 Antwerp	Olympisch Stadion	Athletics, Equestrian, Field hockey, Football (final), Gymnastics, Rugby union, Tug of war, Weightlifting	12,771	
1924 Paris	Fontainebleau (riding)	None	Not listed.	
1924 Paris	Le Stand de Tir de Versailles (shooting)	Shooting (25 m rapid fire pistol, running deer)	82	
1924 Paris	Piscine des Tourelles (swimming)	Diving, Swimming, Water polo	8,023	
1924 Paris	Stade de Colombes (fencing, running)	Athletics, Cycling (road), Equestrian, Fencing, Football (final), Gymnastics, Rugby union, Tennis	22,737	
1928 Amsterdam	Amersfoort (riding)	None	Not listed.	
1928 Amsterdam	Hilversum (running)	Equestrian (non-jumping)	4,763	
1928 Amsterdam	Olympic Sports Park Swim Stadium (swimming)	Diving, Swimming, Water polo	4,440	
1928 Amsterdam	Schermzaal (fencing)	Fencing	559	
1928 Amsterdam	Zeeburg Shooting Grounds (shooting)	None	10,455	
1932 Los Angeles	160th Regiment State Armory (fencing)	Fencing	1,800	
1932 Los Angeles	Los Angeles Police Pistol Range (shooting)	Shooting	Not listed.	
1932 Los Angeles	Riviera Country Club (riding)	Equestrian (dressage, eventing)	9,500	
1932 Los Angeles	Sunset Fields Golf Club (running)	None	Not listed.	
1932 Los Angeles	Swimming Stadium (swimming)	Diving, Swimming, Water polo	10000	
1936 Berlin	Döberitz (riding)	Equestrian (eventing)	Not listed.	
1936 Berlin	Haus des Deutschen Sports (fencing)	Fencing	1200	
1936 Berlin	Olympic Swimming Stadium (swimming)	Diving, Swimming, Water polo	20,000.	
1936 Berlin	Ruhleben (shooting)	None	Not listed.	
1936 Berlin	Wannsee Golf Course (running)	None	Not listed.	
1948 London	Aldershot (fencing, riding, swimming)	Equestrian (jumping)	Not listed.	
1948 London	National Shooting Centre (shooting)	Shooting	Not listed.	
1948 London	Royal Military Academy (running)	None	Not listed.	
1952 Helsinki	Hämeenlinna	None	Not listed.	
1956 Melbourne	Oaklands Hunt Club (riding, running)	None	25,700	
1956 Melbourne	Royal Exhibition Building (fencing)	Basketball (final), Weightlifting, Wrestling	3,500	
1956 Melbourne	Swimming/Diving Stadium (swimming)	Diving, Swimming, Water polo	6,000	
1956 Melbourne	Williamstown (shooting)	Shooting (pistol, rifle)	Not listed.	
1960 Rome	Acqua Santa Golf Club Course (running)	None	Not listed.	
1960 Rome	Palazzo dei Congressi (fencing)	Fencing	Not listed.	
1960 Rome	Passo Corese (riding)	None	Not listed.	
1960 Rome	Stadio Olimpico del Nuoto (swimming)	Diving, Swimming, Water polo (final)	20,000	
1960 Rome	Umberto I Shooting Range (shooting)	Shooting (pistol, rifle)	Not listed.	
1964 Tokyo	Asaka Nezu Park (riding)	None	1,300	
1964 Tokyo	Asaka Shooting Range (shooting)	Shooting (pistol/ rifle)	1,200	
1964 Tokyo	Kemigawa (running)	None	1,500	
1964 Tokyo	National Gymnasium (swimming)	Basketball (final), Diving, Swimming	4,000 (basketball); 11,300 (diving, swimming)	
1964 Tokyo	Waseda Memorial Hall (fencing)	Fencing	2,200	
1968 Mexico City	Campo Militar 1 (riding, running)	None	Not listed.	
1968 Mexico City	Fernando Montes de Oca Fencing Hall (fencing)	Fencing	3,000	
1968 Mexico City	Francisco Márquez Olympic Pool (swimming)	Diving, Swimming, Water polo (final)	15,000	
1968 Mexico City	Vicente Suárez Shooting Range (shooting)	Shooting	Not listed.	
1972 Munich	Messegelände Fechthalle 2 (fencing)	Fencing	978	
1972 Munich	Olympiastadion (running)	Athletics, Ceremonies (opening/ closing), Equestrian (jumping team), Football (final)	77,000	
1972 Munich	Riding Facility, Riem (riding)	Equestrian (jumping individual, eventing cross-country)	23,000	
1972 Munich	Schießanlage (shooting)	Shooting	4,500	
1972 Munich	Schwimmhalle (swimming)	Diving, Swimming, Water polo (final)	9,182	
1976 Montreal	Montreal Botanical Garden (running)	Athletics (20 km walk)	Not listed.	
1976 Montreal	Olympic Equestrian Centre, Bromont (riding)	Equestrian (all events but jumping team final)	35,000	
1976 Montreal	Olympic Pool (swimming)	Diving, Swimming, Water polo (final)	10,000	
1976 Montreal	Olympic Shooting Range, L'Acadie (shooting)	Modern pentathlon (shooting)	1,000	
1976 Montreal	Winter Stadium, Université de Montréal (fencing)	Fencing	2,461	
1980 Moscow	CSKA Football Fieldhouse (fencing)	Fencing	8,500	
1980 Moscow	Dynamo Shooting Range (shooting)	Shooting	2,330	
1980 Moscow	Swimming Pool – Olimpisky (swimming)	Diving, Swimming, Water polo (final)	13,000	
1980 Moscow	Trade Unions' Equestrian Complex (riding, running)	Equestrian (all but jumping individual)	12,000 (jumping); 3,000 (dressage); 2,000 (indoor arena); 400 (eventing endurance)	
1984 Los Angeles	Coto de Caza (fencing, riding, running, shooting)	None	8,000	
1984 Los Angeles	Heritage Park Aquatic Center (swimming)	None	8,000	
1988 Seoul	Jamsil Indoor Swimming Pool (swimming)	Diving, Synchronized swimming, Swimming, Water polo	8,000	
1988 Seoul	Mongchon Tosong (running)	None	10,000	
1988 Seoul	Olympic Fencing Gymnasium (fencing)	Fencing	7,000	
1988 Seoul	Seoul Equestrian Park (riding)	Equestrian (all, except the jumping individual final)	30,000	
1988 Seoul	Taenung International Shooting Range (shooting)	Shooting	2,505	
1992 Barcelona	Cross-country course (running)	None	Not listed.	
1992 Barcelona	Mollet del Vallès Shooting Range (shooting)	Shooting	1,400	
1992 Barcelona	Palau de la Metal·lúrgia (fencing)	Fencing	Not listed.	
1992 Barcelona	Piscines Bernat Picornell (swimming)	Swimming, Synchronized swimming, Water polo (final)	10,000	
1992 Barcelona	Real Club de Polo de Barcelona (riding)	Equestrian (dressage, jumping, eventing final)	9,600	
1996 Atlanta	Georgia International Horse Park (riding, running)	Cycling (mountain bike), Equestrian	32,000	
1996 Atlanta	Georgia Tech Aquatic Center (swimming)	Diving, Swimming, Synchronized swimming, Water polo	15,000	
1996 Atlanta	Georgia World Congress Center (fencing, shooting)	Fencing, Handball, Judo, Table tennis, Weightlifting, Wrestling	3,900 (fencing); 7,300 (handball); 7,300 (judo); 4,700 (table tennis); 5,000 (weightlifting); 7,300 (wrestling)	
2000 Sydney	Sydney Baseball Stadium (riding, running)	Baseball (final)	21,000	
2000 Sydney	Sydney International Aquatic Centre (swimming)	Diving, Swimming, Synchronized swimming, Water polo (men's final)	10,000	
2000 Sydney	The Dome and Exhibition Complex (fencing, shooting)	Badminton, Gymnastics (rhythmic), Handball, Volleyball (indoor)	10,000	
2004 Athens	Olympic Modern Pentathlon Centre	None	10,000	
2008 Beijing	Olympic Green Convention Center (fencing, shooting)	Modern pentathlon (fencing, shooting)	5,695	
2008 Beijing	Olympic Sports Centre (riding, running)	Football	36,228	
2008 Beijing	Ying Tung Natatorium (swimming)	Water polo	4,852	
2012 London	Aquatics Centre (swimming)	Diving, Swimming, Synchronized swimming	17,500	
2012 London	Greenwich Park (riding, combined run & shoot)	Equestrian	23,000	
2012 London	Copper Box (fencing)	Fencing, Handball	7,000	
2016 Rio de Janeiro	Deodoro Stadium (riding, combined run & shoot)	Rugby sevens		
2016 Rio de Janeiro	Deodoro Aquatics Centre (swimming)	None		
2016 Rio de Janeiro	Youth Arena (fencing)	Basketball (women's group stage)		
2020 Tokyo	Musashino Forest Sport Plaza (fencing)	Badminton	7,200	
2020 Tokyo	Tokyo Stadium (swimming, riding, combined run & shoot)	Football, Rugby sevens	48,000	
2024 Paris	Palace of Versailles (swimming, riding, combined run & shoot)	Equestrian	80,000	
2024 Paris	Parc des Expositions de Villepinte (fencing)	Boxing (preliminaries)	6,000	
2028 Los Angeles	Sepulveda Dam	basketball (3x3), BMX racing/BMX freestyle	TBD	
2032 Brisbane	Springfield Central Stadium	None	10,000	

== Gallery of venues ==
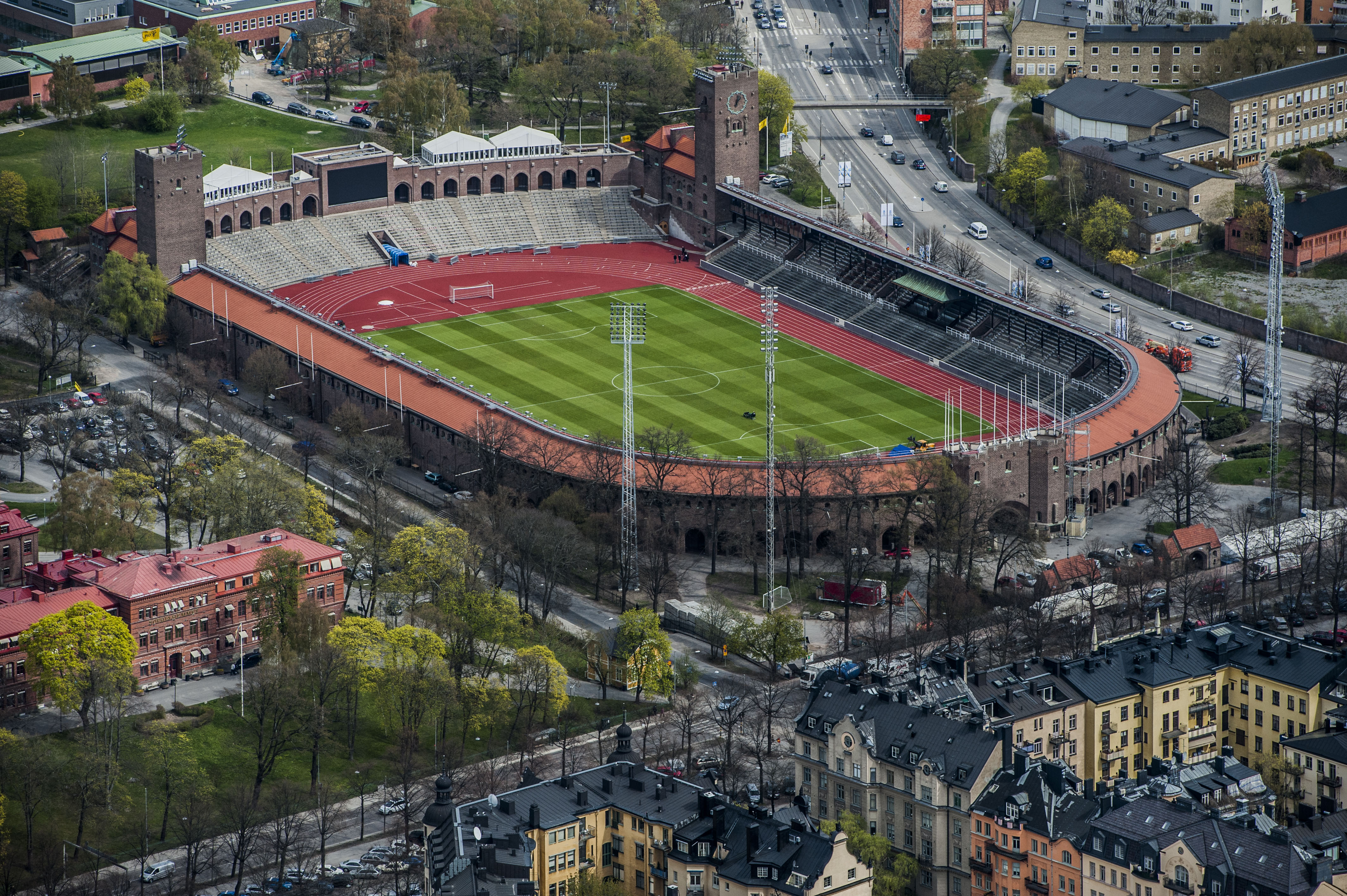
Stockholm Olympic Stadium hosted the running portion of modern pentathlon at the 1912 Summer Olympics.

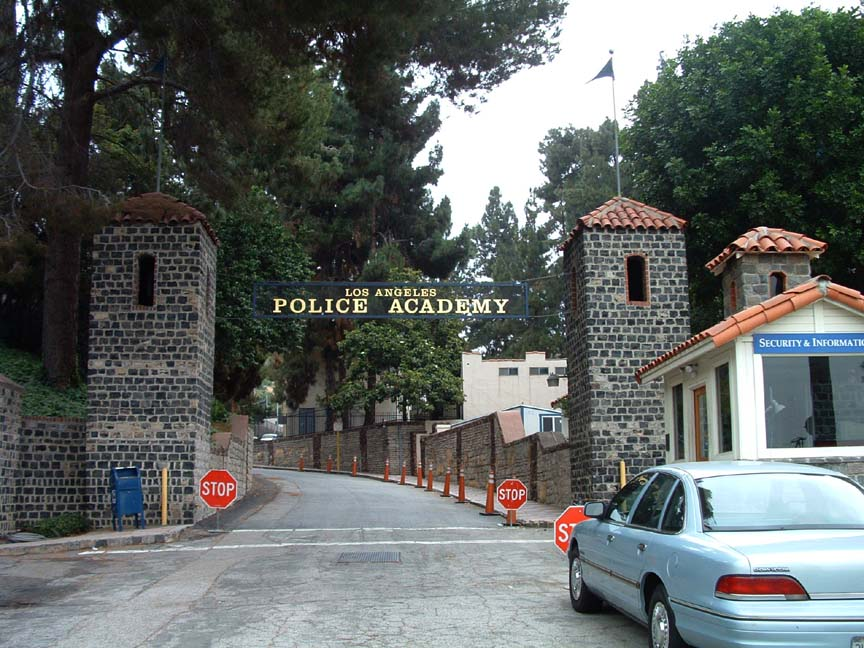
The Los Angeles Police Department Academy shooting range hosted the shooting portion of modern pentathlon at the 1932 Summer Olympics.

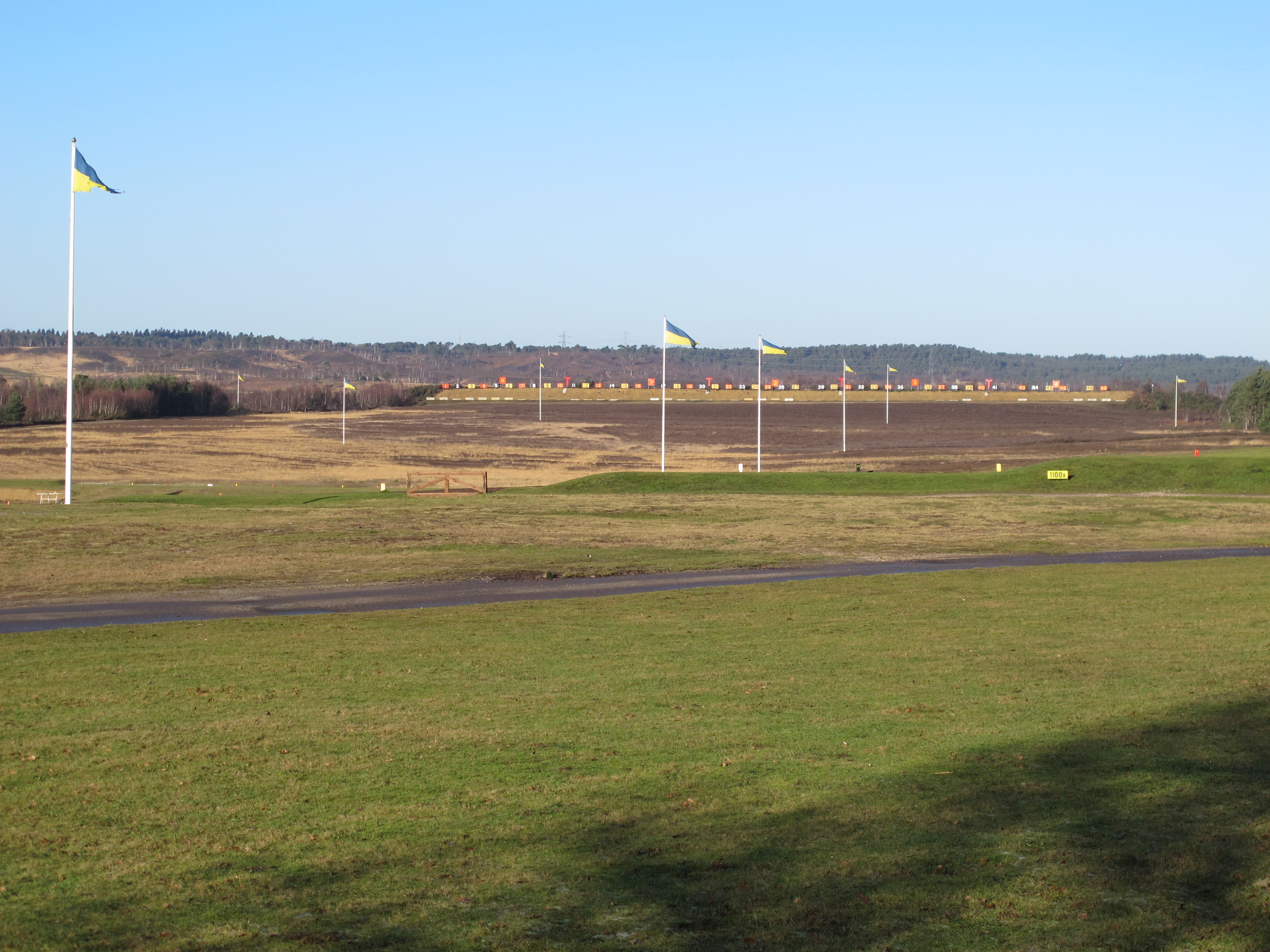
The National Shooting Centre hosted the shooting portion of modern pentathlon at the 1948 Summer Olympics in London.

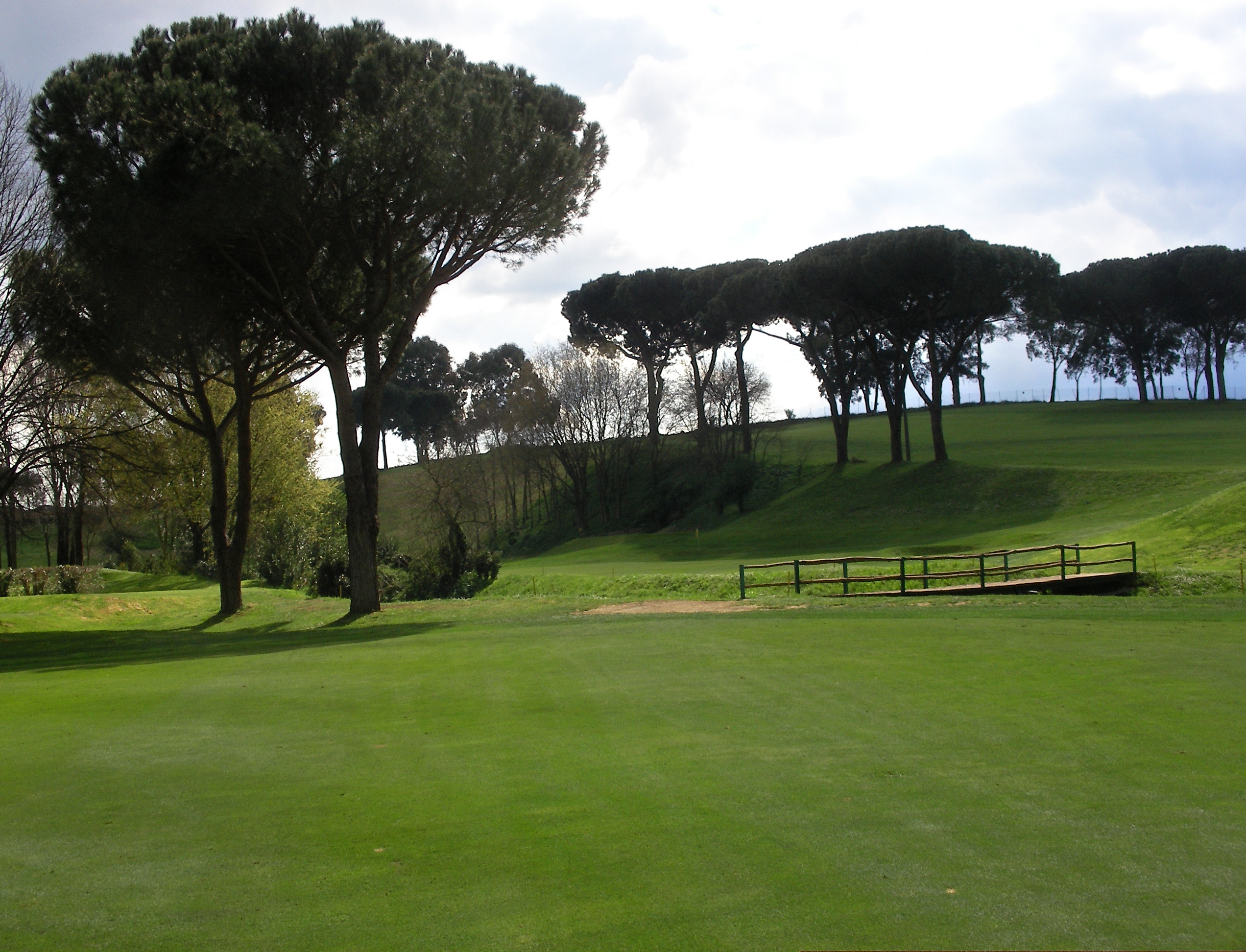
Acqua Santa Golf Club Course hosted the running portion of modern pentathlon at the 1960 Summer Olympics in Rome.

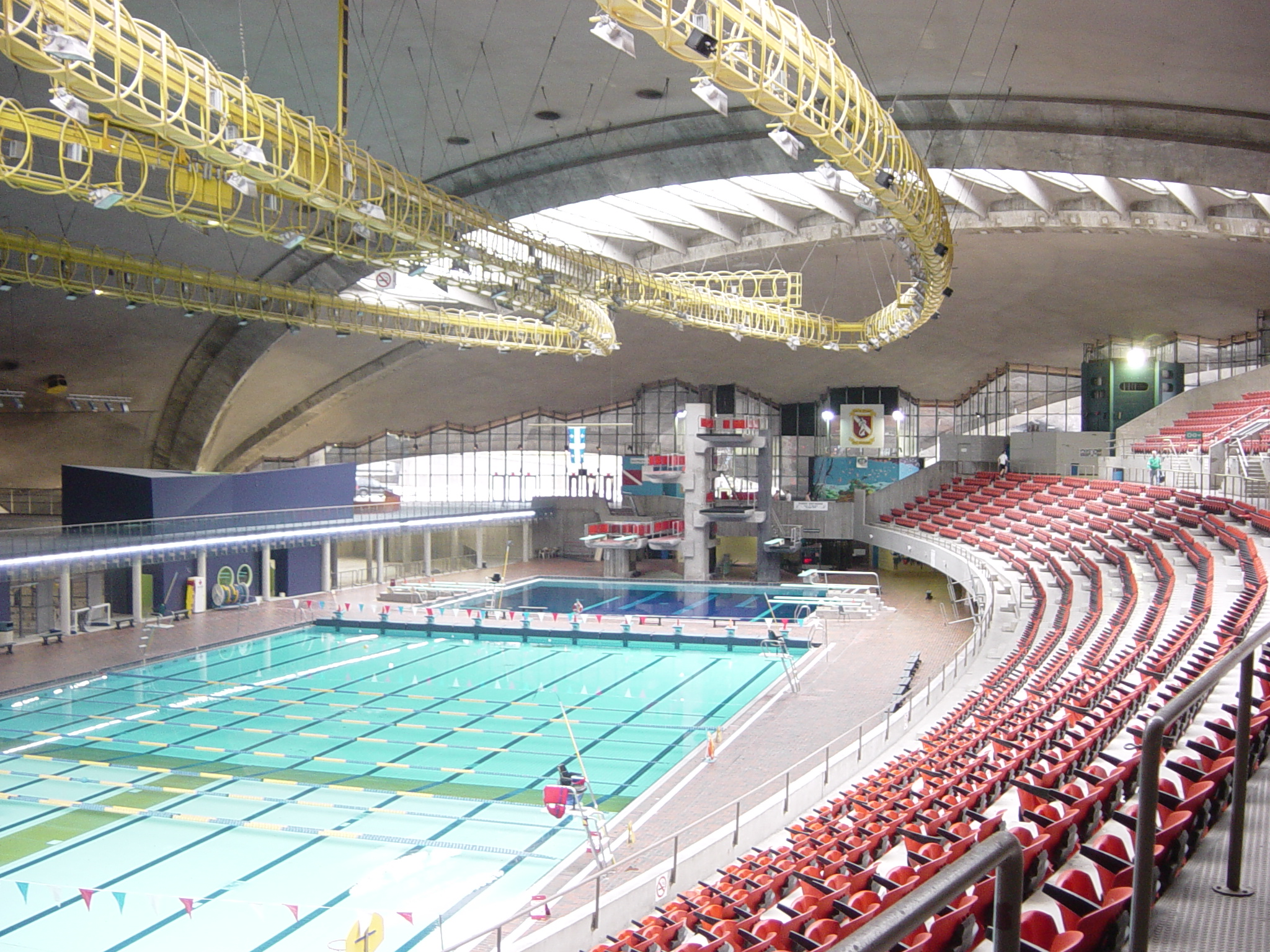
The Montreal Olympic Pool hosted the swimming portion of modern pentathlon at the 1976 Summer Olympics.

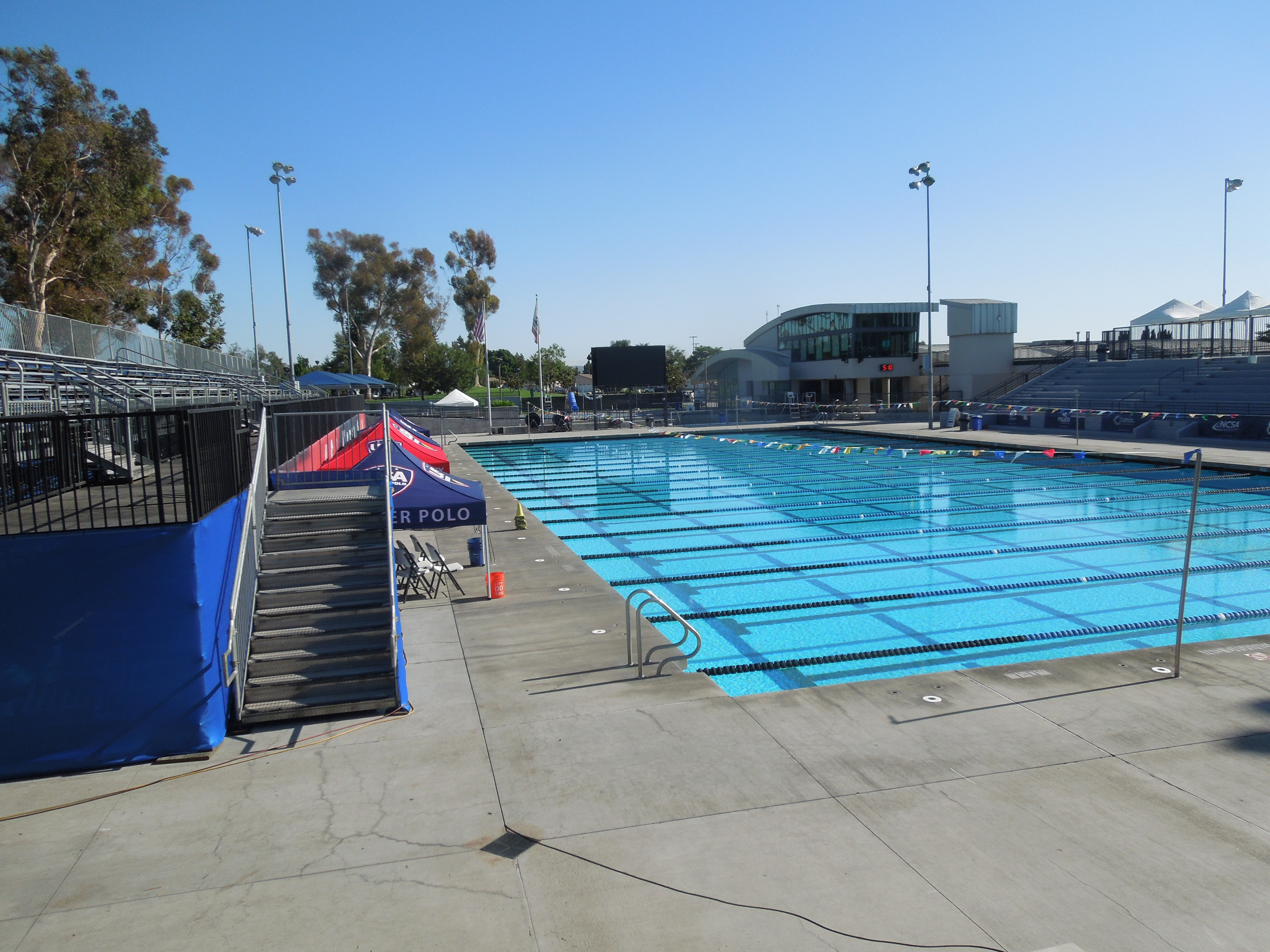
William Woollett Jr. Aquatics Center hosted the swimming portion of modern pentathlon at the 1984 Summer Olympics in Los Angeles.

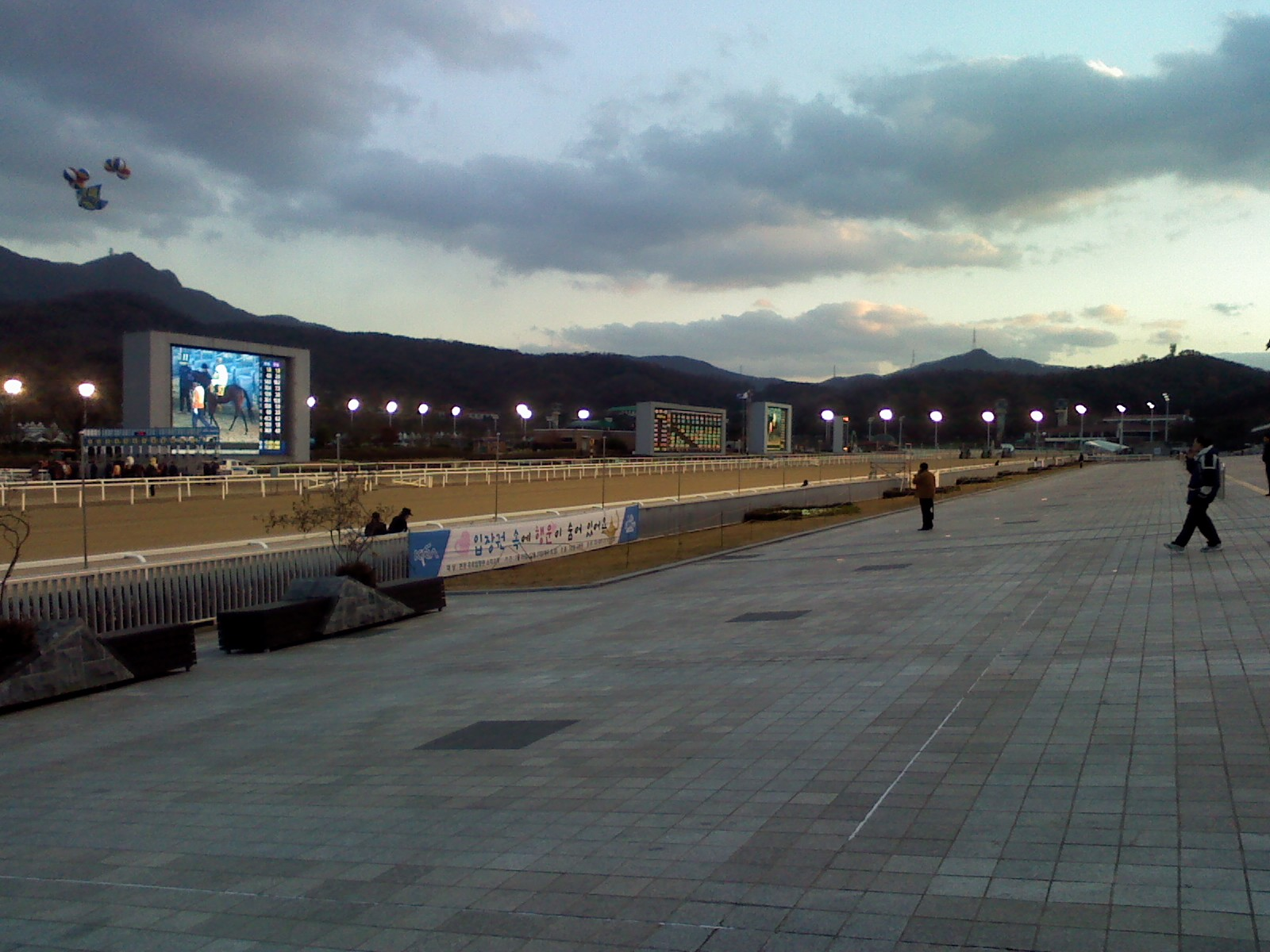
Seoul Equestrian Park hosted the riding portion of modern pentathlon at the 1988 Summer Olympics in Seoul.

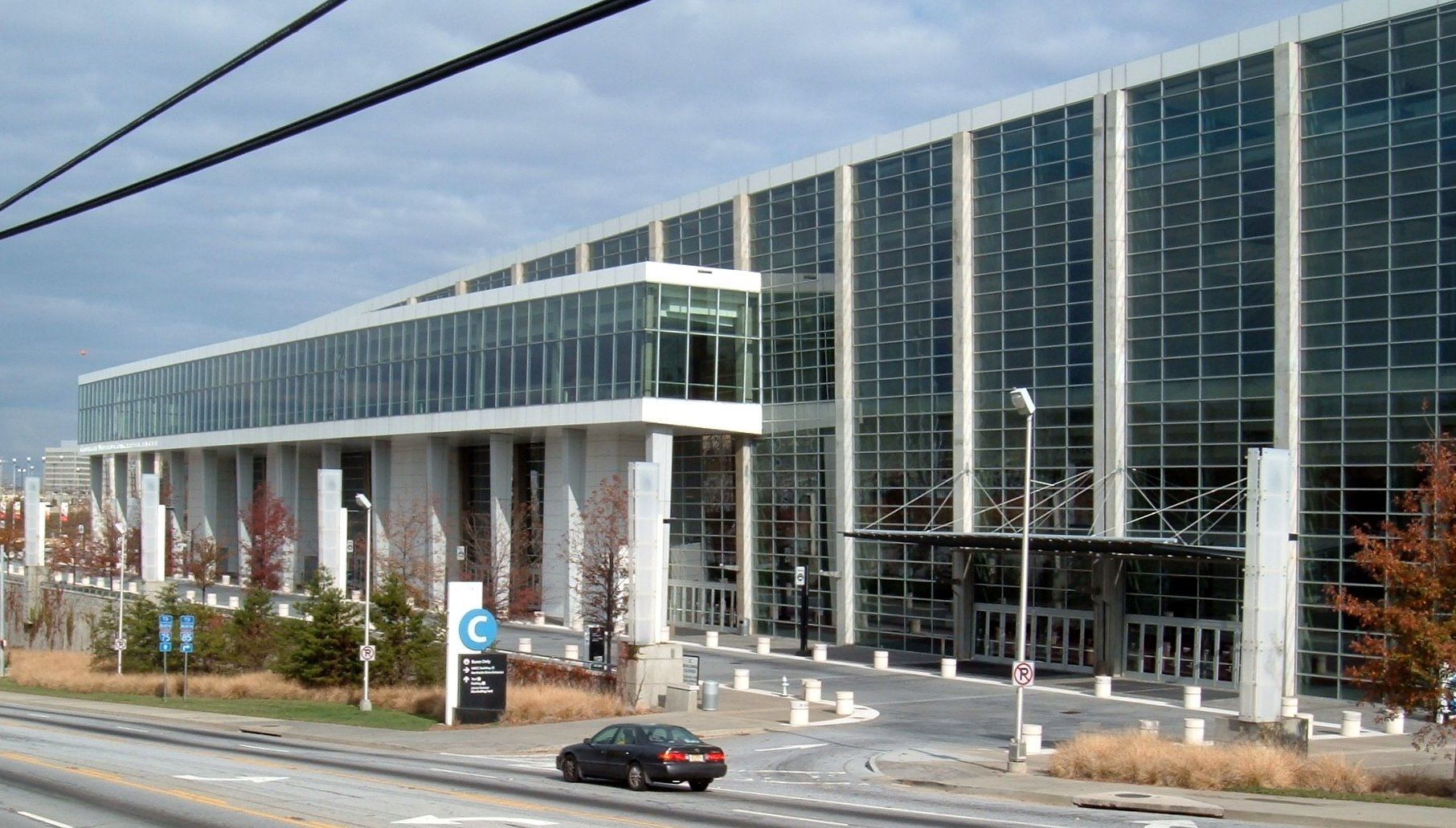
Georgia World Congress Center hosted the fencing and shooting portion of modern pentathlon at the 1996 Summer Olympics in Atlanta.

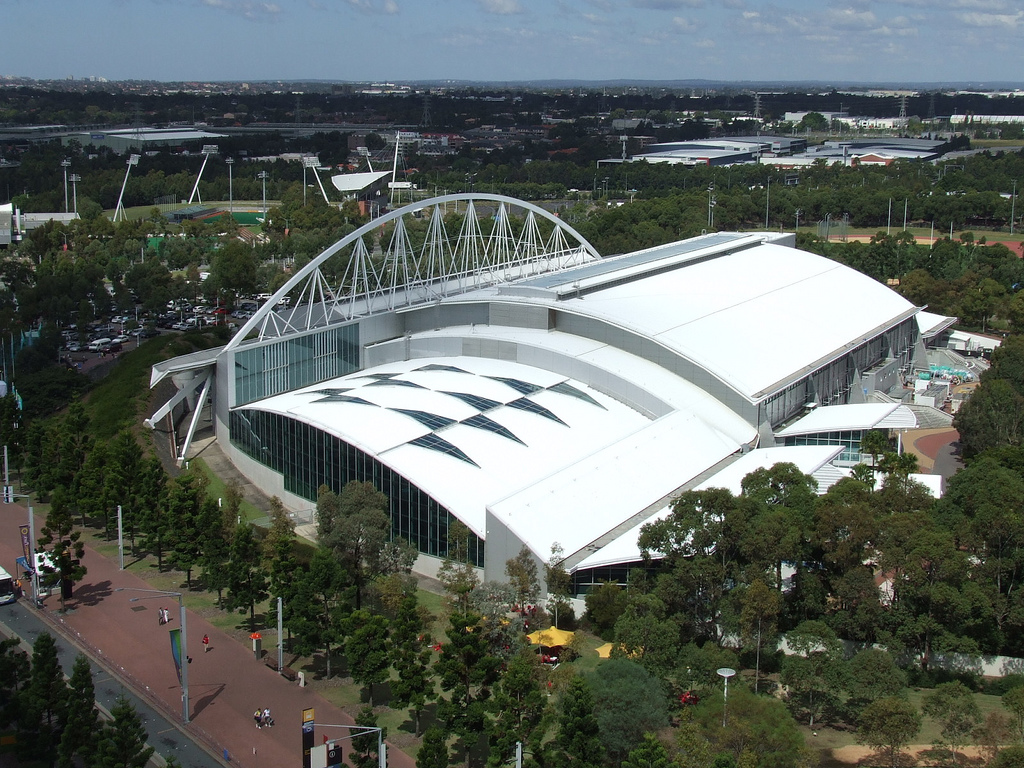
Sydney International Aquatic Centre hosted the swimming portion of modern pentathlon at the 2000 Summer Olympics.

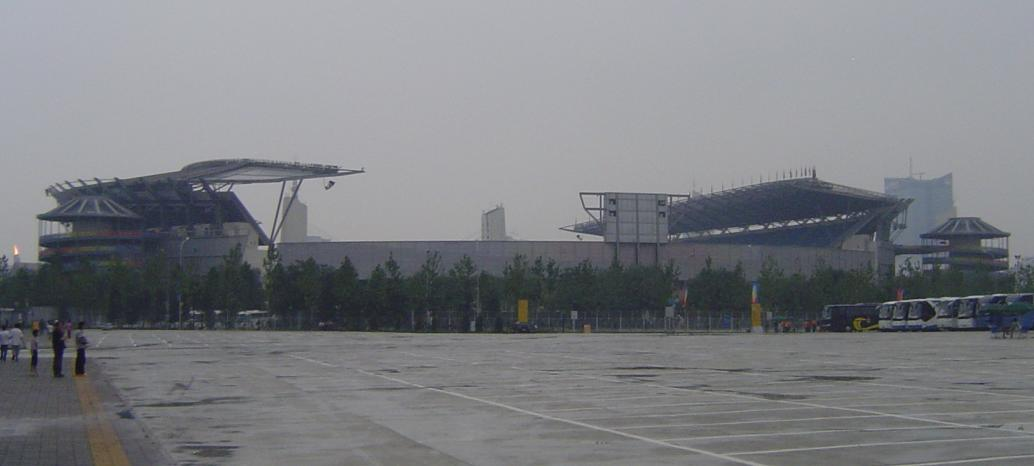
Olympic Sports Centre hosted the riding and running portions of modern pentathlon at the 2008 Summer Olympics in Beijing.

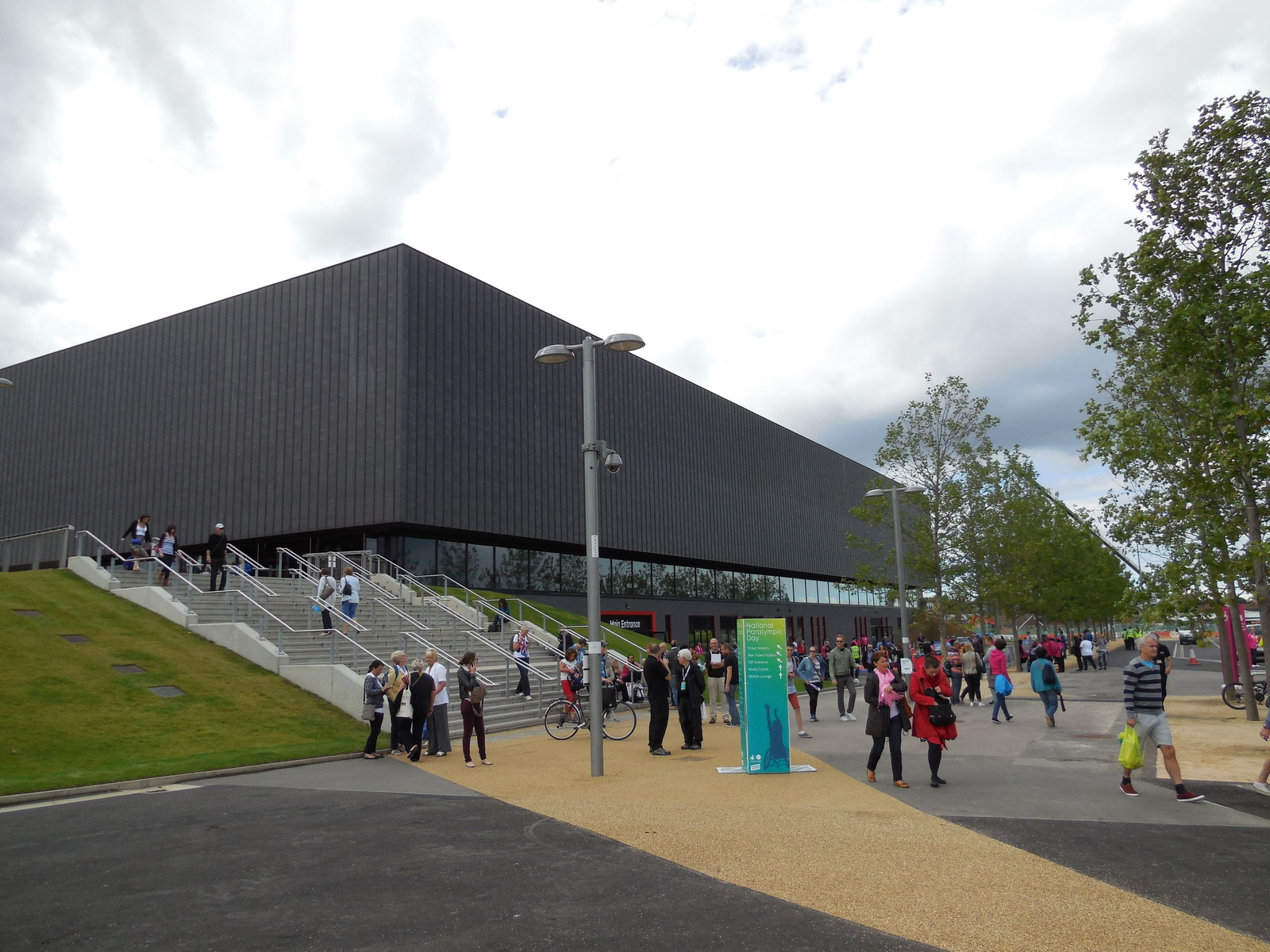
Copper Box Arena hosted the fencing portion of modern pentathlon at the 2012 Summer Olympics in London.

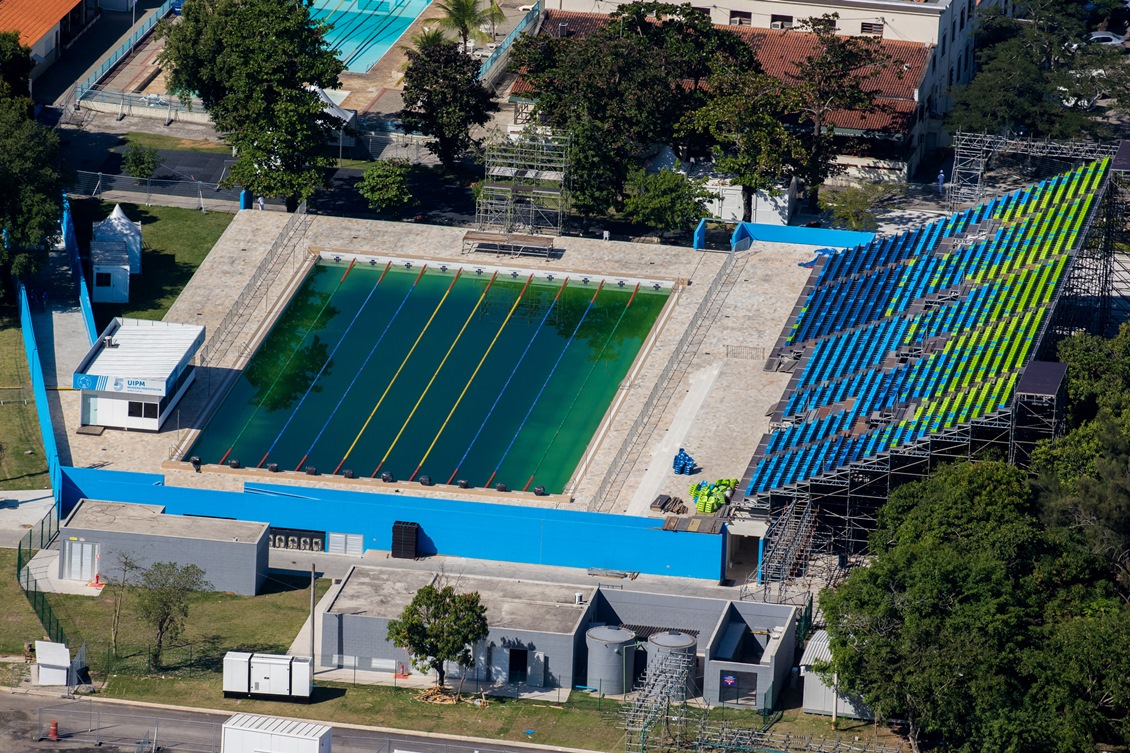
Deodoro Aquatics Centre hosted the swimming portion of modern pentathlon at the 2016 Summer Olympics in Rio de Janeiro.

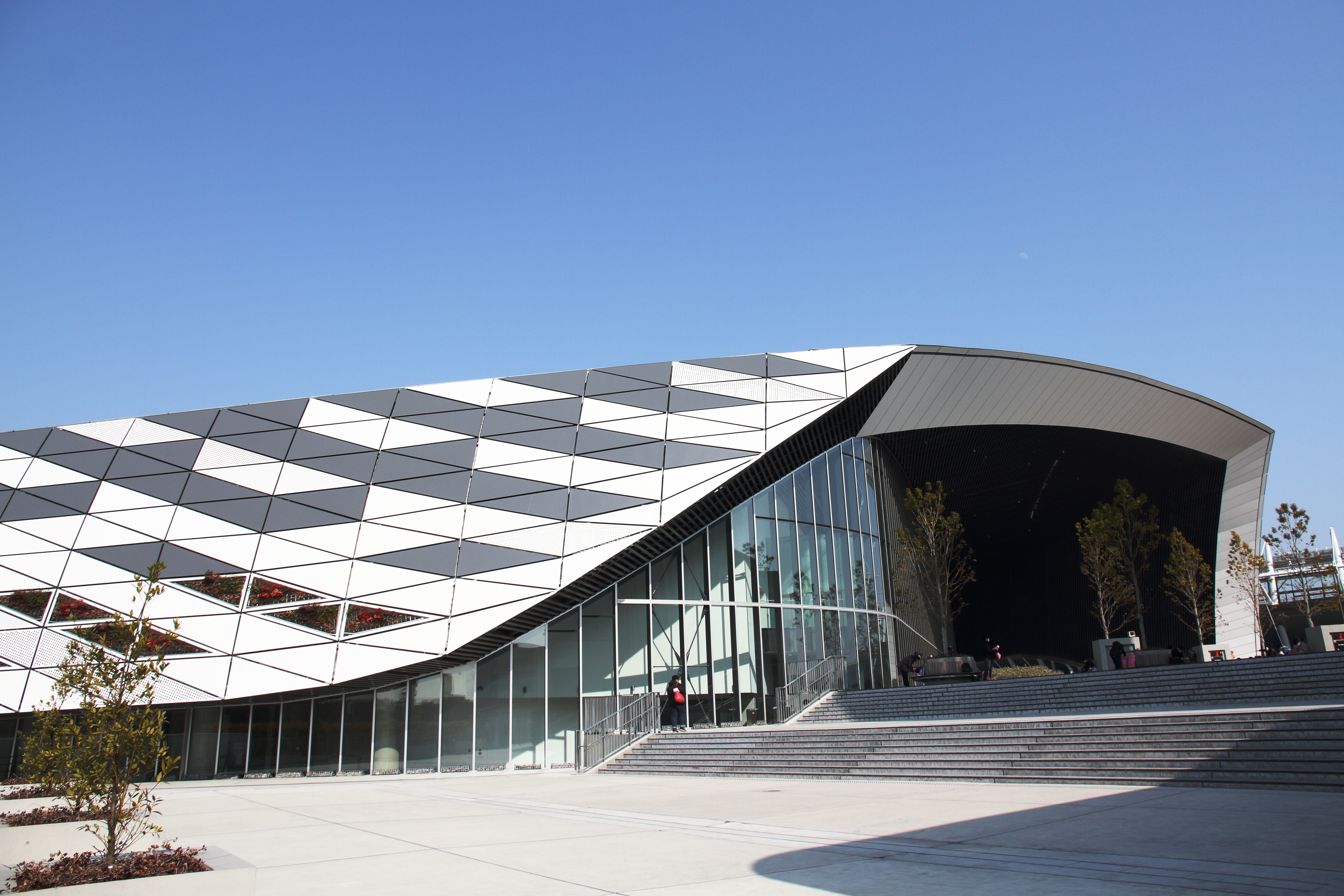
Musashino Forest Sport Plaza hosted the fencing portion of modern pentathlon at the 2020 Summer Olympics in Tokyo.

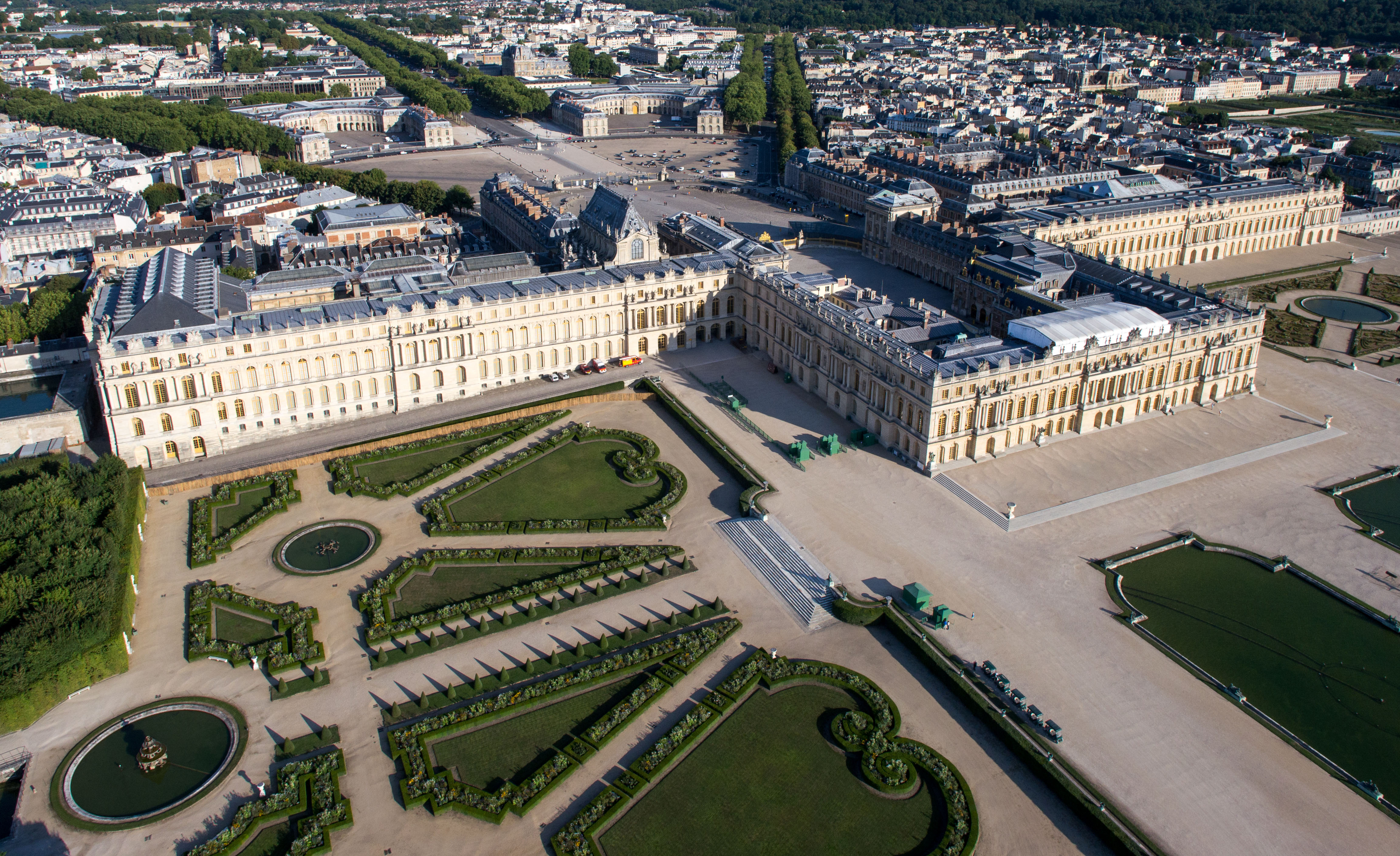
The Palace of Versailles hosted the swimming, riding, combined run & shoot portions of modern pentathlon at the 2024 Summer Olympics in Paris.

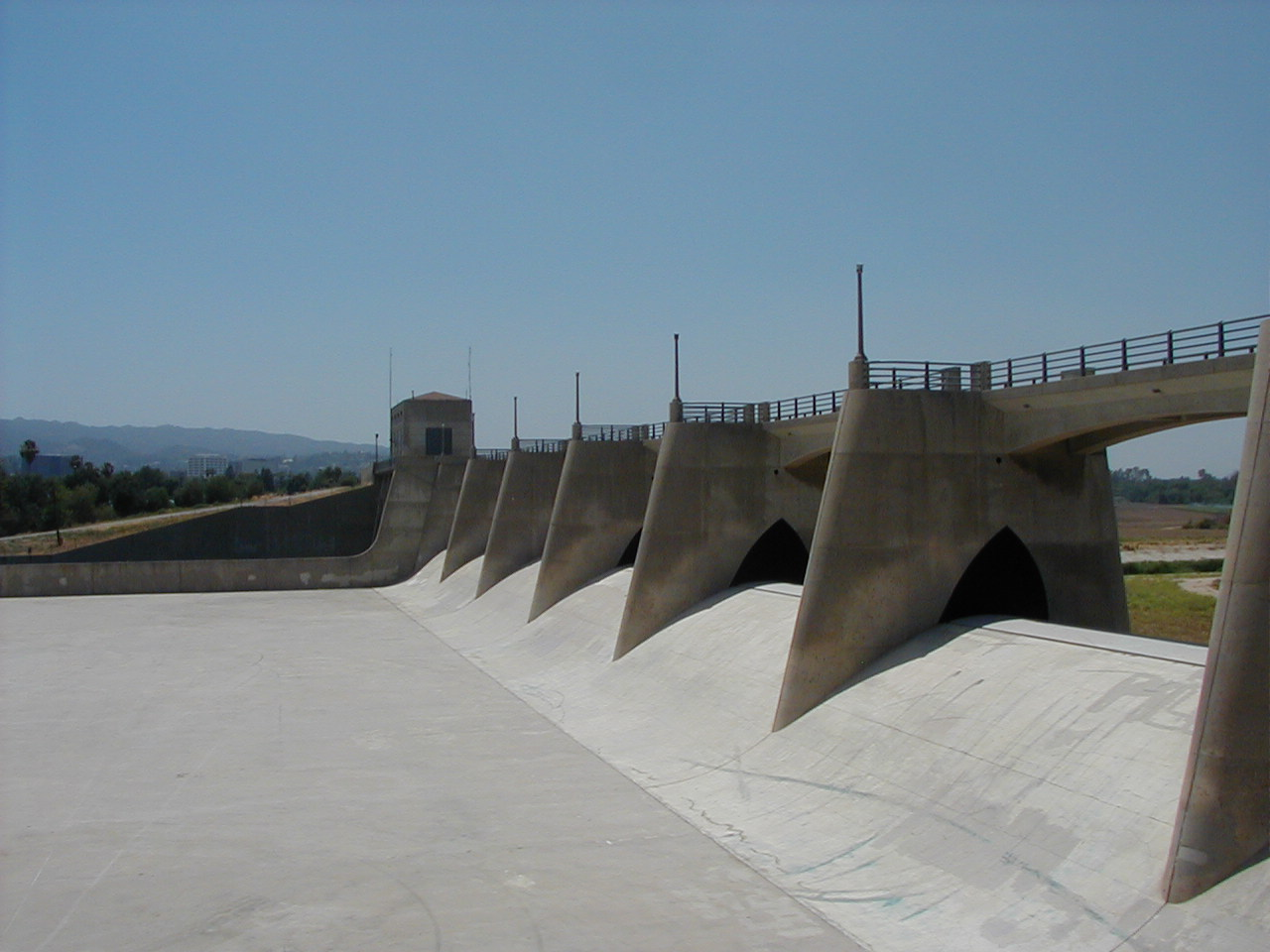
The Sepulveda Basin will host modern pentathlon at the 2028 Summer Olympics in Los Angeles.
