= 1968 Summer Olympics torch relay =

- Host city: Mexico City, Mexico
- Countries visited: Greece, Italy, Spain, Canary Islands, Bahamas (San Salvador), Mexico
- Distance: 13,620 km (total); 2,530 km (on foot)
- Torchbearers: 2,778
- Theme: Relay to the New World
- Start date: 23 August 1968
- End date: 12 October 1968

The 1968 Summer Olympics torch relay took part as part of the build-up to the 1968 Summer Olympics hosted in Mexico City, Mexico. The Olympic flame was lit in Olympia, Greece, and retraced the steps of Christopher Columbus, discoverer of the New World. This theme celebrated the link between Latin-American and Mediterranean civilizations.

At the end of the relay the Olympic cauldron was for the first time lit by a female athlete. Mexican hurdler Enriqueta Basilio was chosen to complete the final leg of the 2,500 kilometres (1,600 mi) running relay. The torch had covered a total distance of 13,620 kilometres (8,460 mi) including the crossing of the Atlantic Ocean.

While the relay was largely successful it was marred by problems when exchanging the flame from one torch to another. Runners in Barcelona and Medinaceli were burned by small explosions as a lit torch came into contact with an unlit one.

== Relay elements ==
=== Torch ===
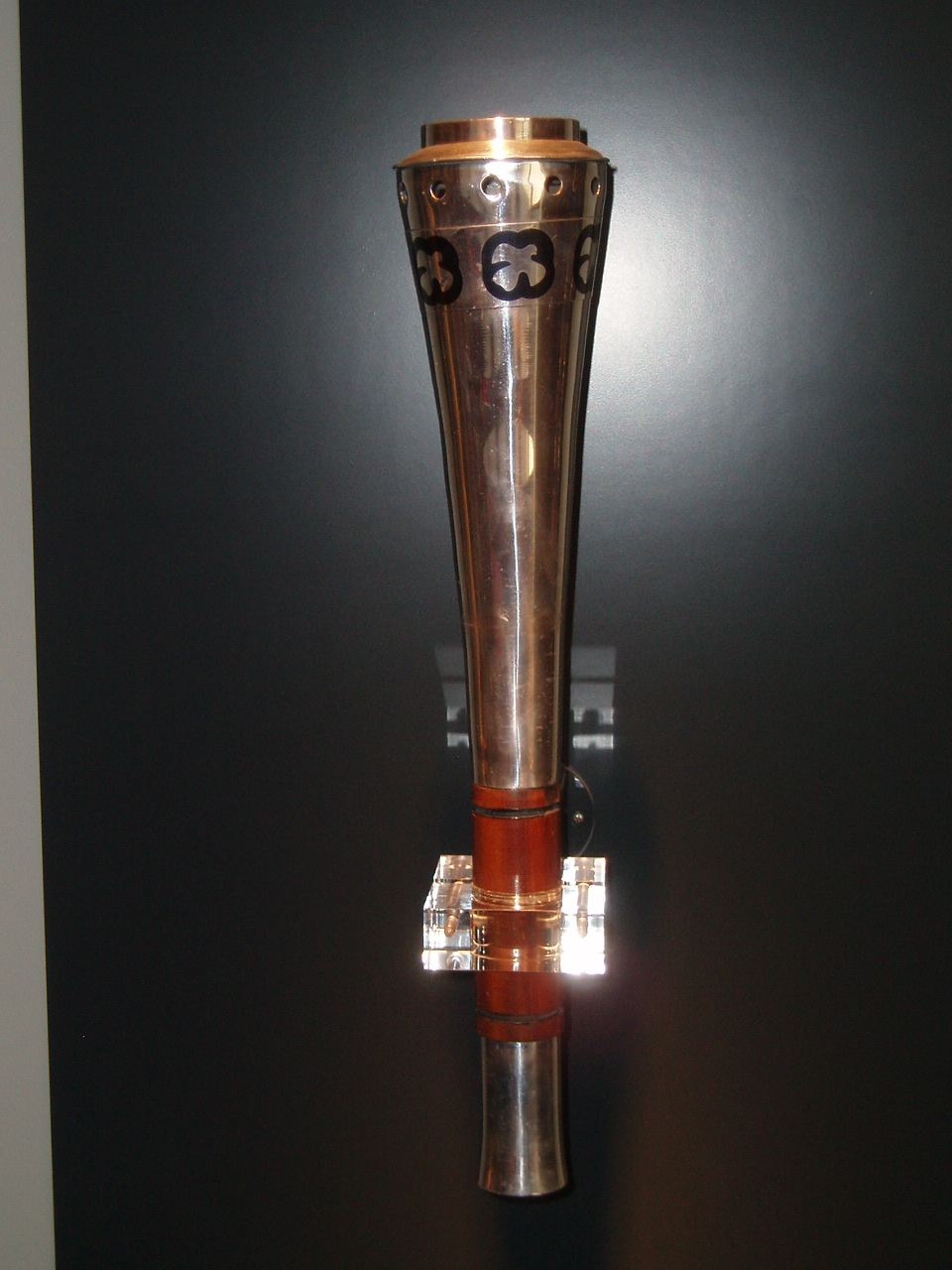
Type A torch used

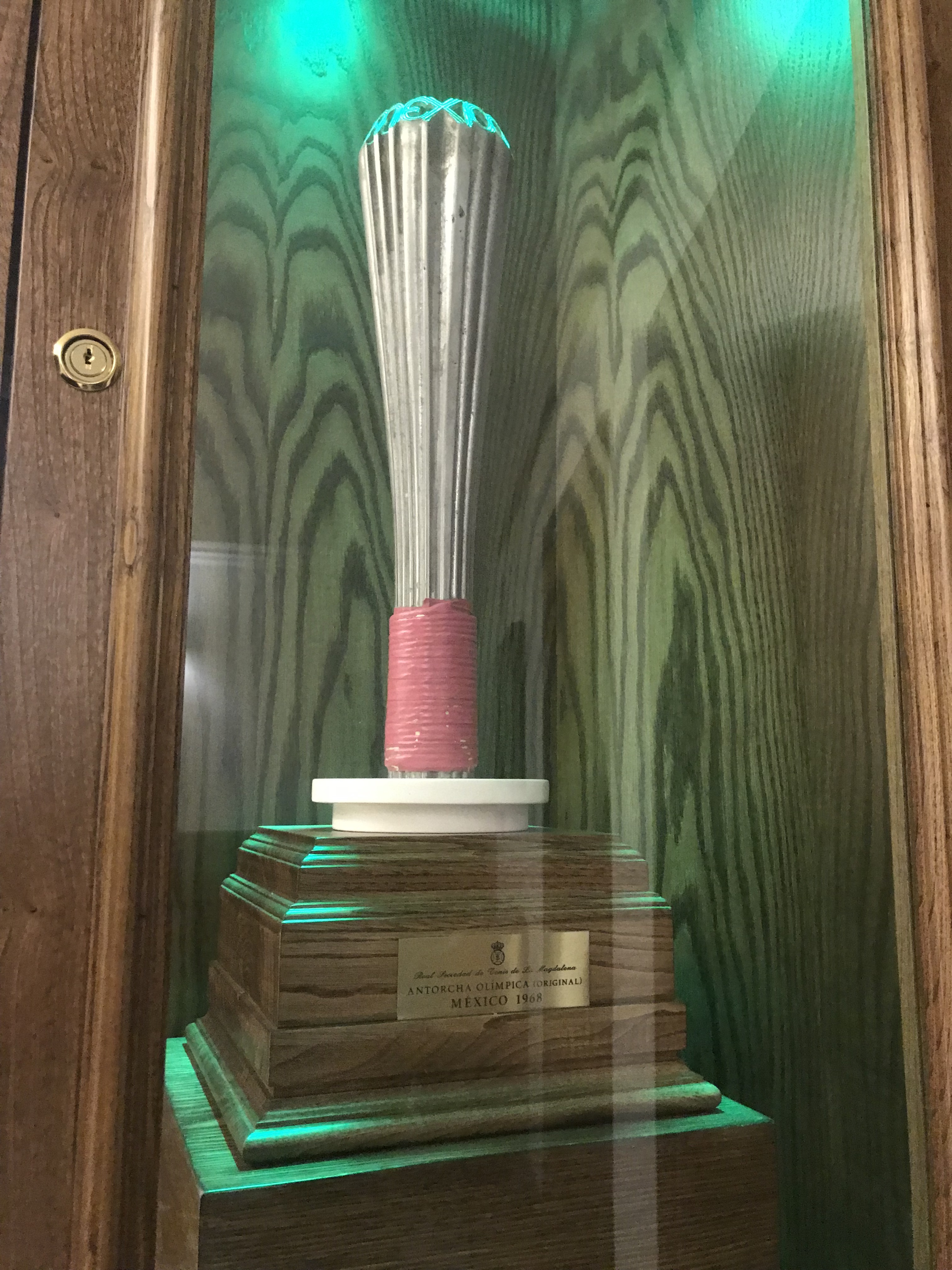
Type B torch, as seen at Real Sociedad de Tenis de la Magdalena, Spain

American sculptor James Metcalf, an expatriate, won the commission to forge the torch for the Games. There were two torch designs used throughout the relay: Type A and Type B. The Type B torch was designed to follow the theme of the logo. It is grooved along its length and features a three-dimensional "MEXICO 68" at the top. It is kept at a Spanish private club, Real Sociedad de Tenis de la Magdalena in Santander, Spain.

The torch used as a fuel source a compressed mix of nitrates, sulphur, alkaline metal carbonates, resins and silicones. It burned with a red-yellow flame. Problems with the torch occurred in Barcelona and then again in Medinaceli which saw minor explosions burn some torch-bearers. The cause was investigated and then attributed to "the too-rapid contact of a lighted torch with an unlighted one". Precautions were put in place to prevent further incidents.

=== Torch-bearers ===
For the first time runners from different nations took part in the relay. In each previous torch relay the National Olympic Committee (NOC) for the host nation provided all the torch-bearers, but for this event each country through which the torch passed was allowed to select their own representatives.

=== Route ===
The route was designed to replicate that taken by Christopher Columbus in his first visit to the New World. Three locations were seen as key to the route:

- Genoa, Italy – The birthplace of Christopher Columbus
- Palos de la Frontera, Spain – The port from which Columbus sailed
- The island of San Salvador – The first land encountered on the voyage

The flame was lit in Olympia and then taken to Athens where a ceremony greeted it on 24 August 1968. From there runners carried the torch to the port of Piraeus and it was taken aboard the Greek destroyer HNS Navarino. The vessel sailed to Genoa, arriving there on 27 August where, outside the birthplace of Christopher Columbus, a special tribute was held. The following day saw the flame begin its journey to Barcelona aboard the Palinuro, an Italian Navy training vessel. The relay crossed several Spanish provinces on its way to Palos de la Frontera, finally being carried into the port by Cristóbal Colón Carbajal, a direct descendant of Columbus. The crossing of the Atlantic Ocean began on 12 September and was overseen by the Spanish government who provided the Princesa for the journey.

On 29 September 1968 the Flame arrived just outside San Salvador at the original landing site of Columbus's first voyage. A celebration organised in conjunction with the Bahamas Olympic Association marked the first time that the Flame had been to the New World. At the end of the festivities the Flame was taken aboard the Mexican destroyer ARM Durango. The ship arrived in Veracruz on 6 October with the torch being swam ashore by a relay of seventeen swimmers. From there the Mexican runners started their journey, and the Flame arrived at the Estadio Olímpico Universitario on 12 October.

In total the relay spanned 13,620 km (8,460 mi), of which 2,530 km (1,570 mi) was on foot and 11,090 km (6,890 mi) was on water.

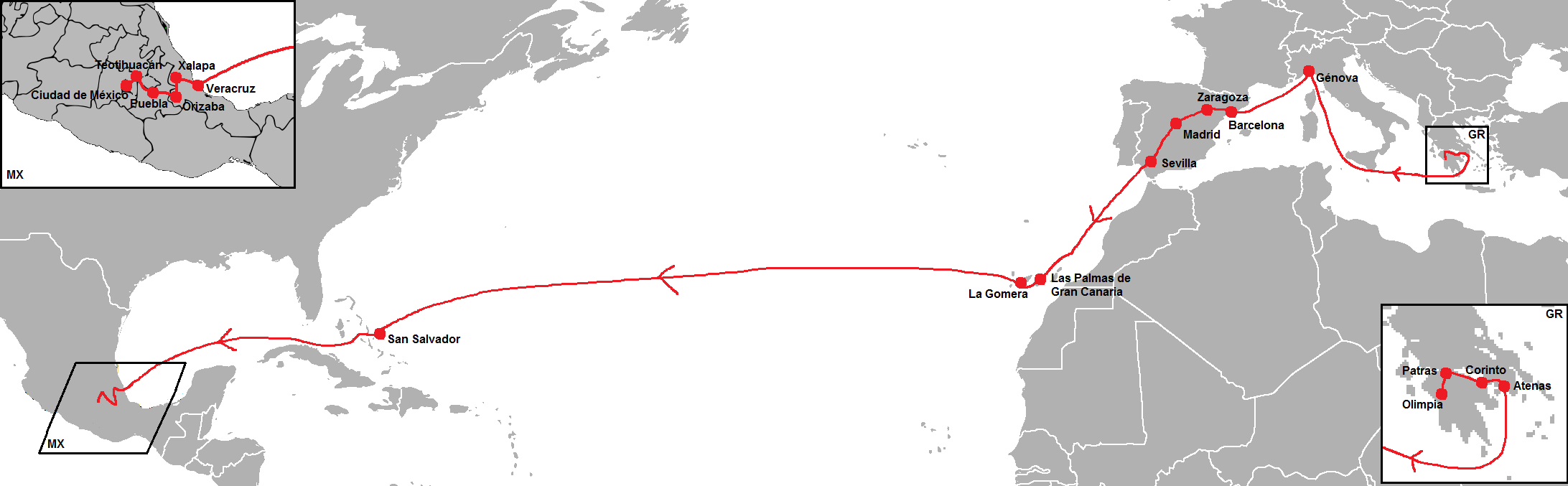
1968 Summer Olympics torch relay.

=== Lighting of the cauldron ===
The cauldron was for the first time lit by a female athlete, Mexican hurdler Enriqueta Basilio. Basilio entered the Estadio Olímpico Universitario and ran a lap around the track before ascending the ramp up to the cauldron.
