= University City Swimming Pool =

Olympic-size swimming pool in Mexico City

Coordinates: 19°19′49″N 99°11′6″W

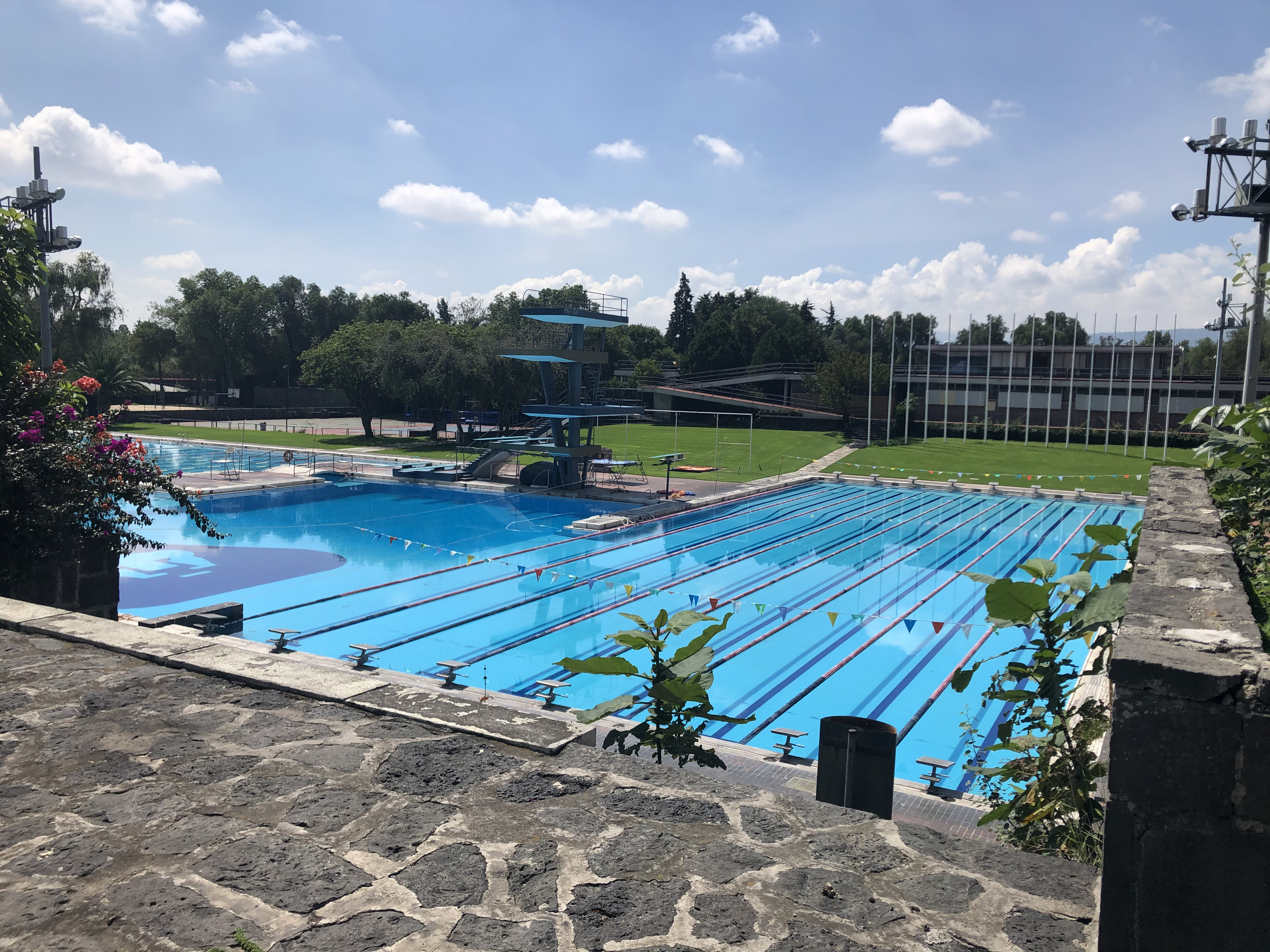
Alberca Olímpica de Ciudad Universitaria

The University City Swimming Pool is located on the Ciudad Universitaria campus of UNAM in Mexico City. For the 1968 Summer Olympics, it hosted some of the water polo competitions.

== History ==
It was inaugurated on 10 March 1954, as part of the University City architectural complex, and was considered the largest swimming pool in the world. It hosted the swimming competitions of the VII Central American and Caribbean Games that year. Subsequently, in 1955, it hosted the aquatics competitions of the II Pan American Games.
