= Raoul Gueguen =

French modern pentathlete

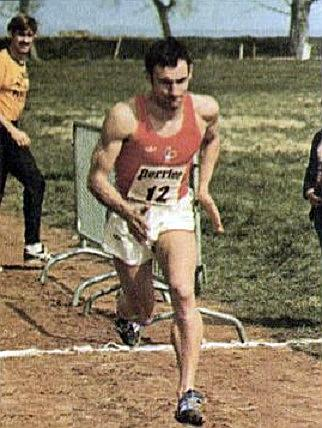
- Raoul Gueguen (1975)

Personal information
- Born: 20 June 1947 (age 79) Garlan, France

Sport
- Sport: Modern pentathlon
Medal record
Men's modern pentathlon
Representing France
Olympic Games
Bronze medal – third place	1968 Mexico City	Team

Raoul Gueguen (born 20 June 1947) is a French former modern pentathlete who competed at the 1968 Summer Olympics and the 1972 Summer Olympics. In 1968, he won a bronze medal in the team event.
