= Modern pentathlon at the 1968 Summer Olympics =

Men's modern pentathlon at the Games of the XIX Olympiad
- Venue: Campo Militar 1; Fernando Montes de Oca Fencing Hall; Alberca Olímpica Francisco Márquez; Vicente Suárez Shooting Range
- Dates: October 13–17, 1968
- Competitors: 48 from 18 nations

The modern pentathlon at the 1968 Summer Olympics was represented by two events (both for men): Individual competition and Team competition. As usual in Olympic modern pentathlon, one competition was held and each competitor's score was included to the Individual competition event results table and was also added to his teammates' scores to be included to the Team competition event results table. This competition consisted of 5 disciplines:

- Equestrian, held on October 13
- Fencing, held on October 14
- Shooting, held on October 15
- Swimming, held on October 16
- Cross-country, held on October 17

== Medal summary ==
Event	Gold	Silver	Bronze
Individual	Björn Ferm; Sweden	András Balczó; Hungary	Pavel Lednyov; Soviet Union
Team	Hungary; András Balczó; István Móna; Ferenc Török	Soviet Union; Boris Onishchenko; Pavel Lednyov; Stasys Šaparnis	France; Raoul Gueguen; Lucien Guiguet; Jean-Pierre Giudicelli

Individual scores: Men's Individual at the 1968 Summer Olympics

== Medal table ==
Rank	Nation	Gold	Silver	Bronze	Total
1	Hungary	1	1	0	2
2	Sweden	1	0	0	1
3	Soviet Union	0	1	1	2
4	France	0	0	1	1
Totals (4 entries)		2	2	2	6

== Participating nations ==
A total of 48 athletes from 18 nations competed at the Mexico Games:

- Australia (3)
- Austria (3)
- Bulgaria (3)
- Czechoslovakia (1)
- Denmark (1)
- East Germany (3)
- Finland (3)
- France (3)
- Great Britain (3)
- Hungary (3)
- Italy (3)
- Japan (3)
- Mexico (3)
- Soviet Union (3)
- Sweden (3)
- Switzerland (1)
- United States (3)
- West Germany (3)
