= Lucien Guiguet =

French modern pentathlete

Personal information
- Born: 26 September 1942 (age 83) Cherchell, Algeria

Sport
- Sport: Modern pentathlon
Medal record
Men's modern pentathlon
Representing France
Olympic Games
Bronze medal – third place	1968 Mexico City	Team

Lucien Guiguet (born 26 September 1942) is a French former modern pentathlete. He competed at the 1968 Summer Olympics winning a bronze medal in the team event.
