= Jean-Pierre Giudicelli =

French modern pentathlete (1943–2024)

Personal information
- Born: 20 February 1943 Pau, France
- Died: April 2024 (aged 81)

Sport
- Sport: Modern pentathlon
Medal record
Men's modern pentathlon
Representing France
Olympic Games
Bronze medal – third place	1968 Mexico City	Team

Jean-Pierre Giudicelli (20 February 1943 – April 2024) was a French modern pentathlete. He competed at the 1968 Summer Olympics and the 1972 Summer Olympics. In 1968, he won a bronze medal in the team event.

Giudicelli died in April 2024, at the age of 81.
