= Vicente Suárez Shooting Range =

Temporary facility for 1968 Olympics

The Vicente Suárez Shooting Range was a temporary firing range constructed in Campo Militar 1 for the 1968 Summer Olympics. During those games, it hosted all of the shooting events, the first time the competitions took place at the same location since 1928. It also hosted the shooting part of the modern pentathlon competition.
