= Fernando Montes de Oca Fencing Hall =

Sports venue in Mexico City, Mexico

Coordinates: 19°24′27″N 99°05′30″W

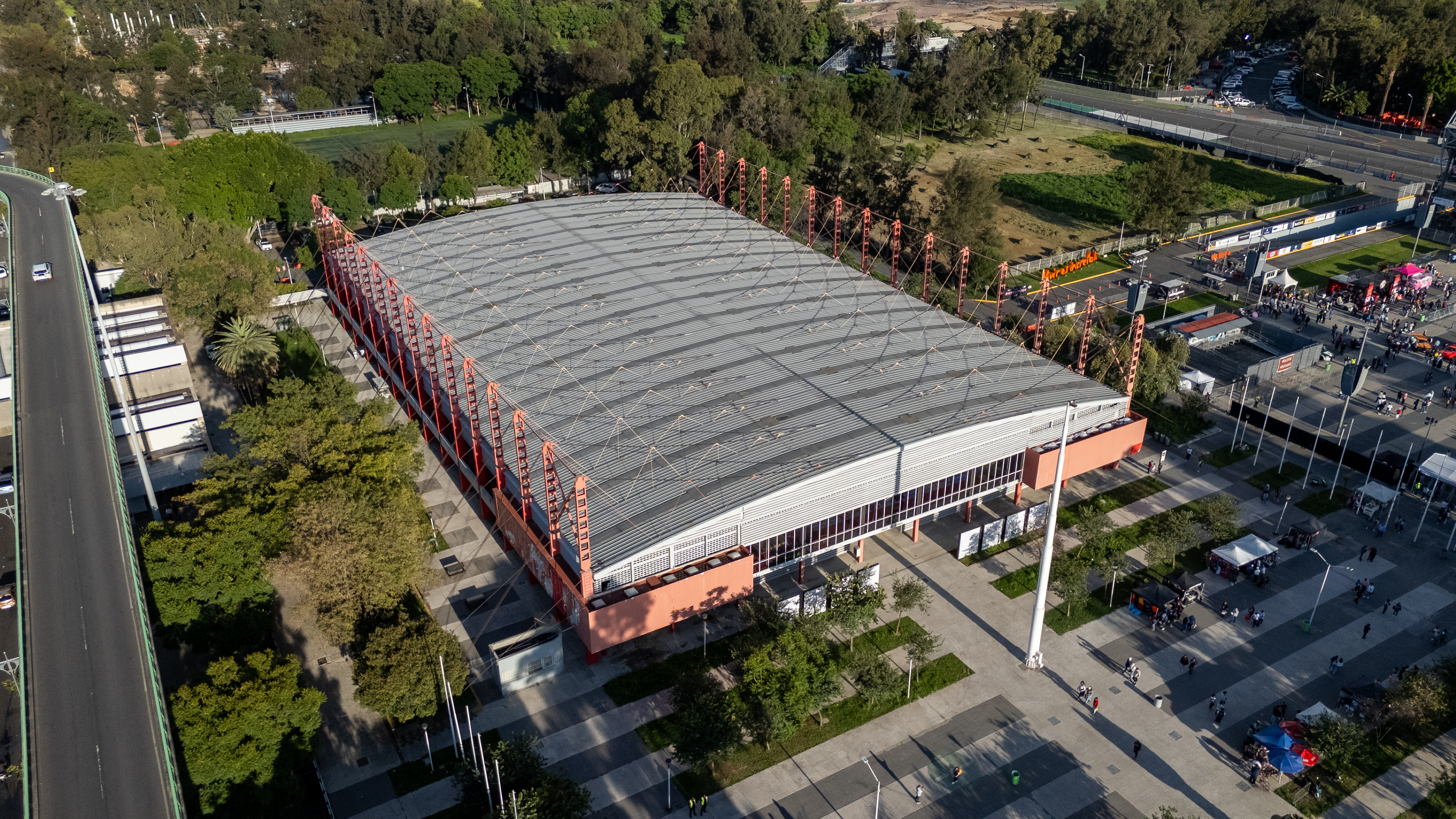
Aerial shot of Fernando Montes de Oca Fencing Hall, now Sala de Armas de la Magdalena Mixiuhca.

The Fernando Montes de Oca Fencing Hall is an indoor sports venue located in the Magdalena Mixhuca Sports City area of Mexico City. It hosted the fencing competitions and the fencing part of the modern pentathlon competition of the 1968 Summer Olympics.

The Olympic Fencing Hall was built between November 13, 1967, and September 1968, in the Magdalena Mixhuca Sports City. The 310-by-210-foot (94 by 64 m) rectangular structure is covered by a convex roof of corrugated asbestos supported by steel cables.

For the Olympics, the ground floor had 15 fencing strips—each of which was provided with a two-sided scoreboard, a judges' podium and a control table—and 37 cubicles for competitors. On the south side were facilities for the press, dressing rooms, etc. The north side housed offices, a lounge, a warm-up area and additional dressing rooms and service areas. On the upper floor were grandstands with a seating capacity of 3,000.
