= Campo Militar 1 =

Coordinates: 19.4422765°N 99.231853°W

Campo Militar No. 1 (English: Military Camp 1) is a military installation located between Conscripto and Zapadores Avenue and the Belt Freeway in Mexico City. For the 1968 Summer Olympics, it hosted the riding and running portions of the modern pentathlon competition.
