= 1968 Summer Olympics =

Multi-sport event in Mexico City, Mexico

Games of the XIX Olympiad
- Emblem of the 1968 Summer Olympics
- Location: Mexico City, Mexico
- Nations: 112
- Athletes: 5,516 (4,735 men, 781 women)
- Events: 172 in 18 sports (24 disciplines)
- Opening: 12 October 1968
- Closing: 27 October 1968
- Opened by: President Gustavo Díaz Ordaz
- Closed by: IOC president Avery Brundage
- Cauldron: Enriqueta Basilio
- Stadium: Estadio Olímpico Universitario

The 1968 Summer Olympics (Spanish: Juegos Olímpicos de Verano de 1968), officially known as the Games of the XIX Olympiad (Spanish: Juegos de la XIX Olimpiada) and officially branded as Mexico 1968 (Spanish: México 1968), were an international multi-sport event held from 12 to 27 October 1968, in Mexico City, Mexico. These were the first Olympic Games to be staged in Latin America, the first to be staged in a Spanish-speaking country, and the first to be staged in the Global South. Consequently, these games also marked the first time that there would be a gap of two Olympic Games not to be held in Europe. They were also the first Games to use an all-weather (smooth) track for track and field events instead of the traditional cinder track, as well as the first example of the Olympics exclusively using electronic timekeeping equipment.

The 1968 Games were the third to be held in the last quarter of the year, after the 1956 Games in Melbourne and the 1964 Games in Tokyo. The 1968 Mexican Student Movement was crushed days prior, hence the Games were correlated to the government's repression.

The United States won the most gold and overall medals for the last time until the 1984 Summer Games.

== Host city selection ==
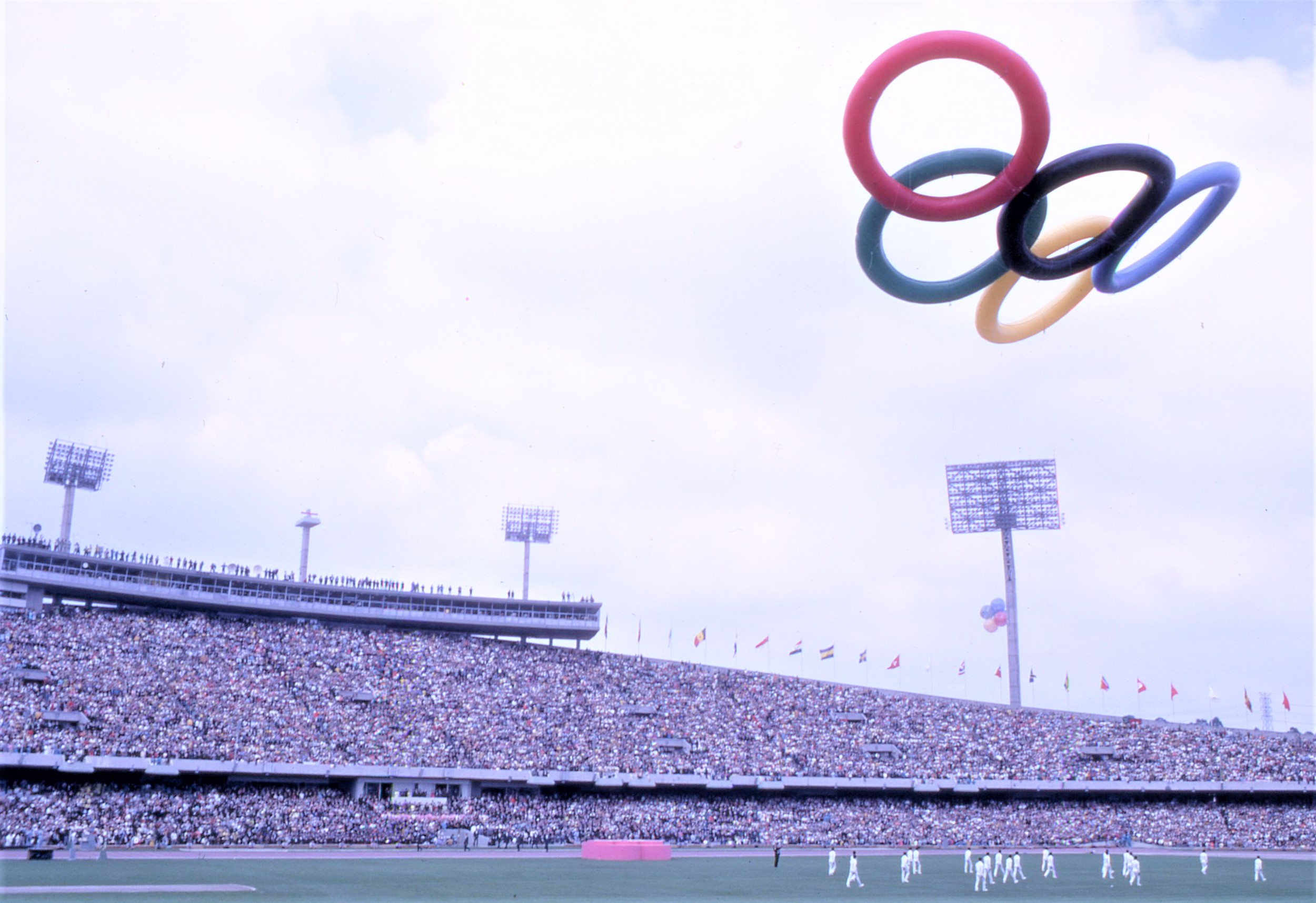
Opening Ceremony of the 1968 Summer Olympic Games at the Estadio Olímpico Universitario in Mexico City

On 18 October 1963, at the 60th IOC Session in Baden-Baden, West Germany, Mexico City finished ahead of bids from Detroit, Buenos Aires and Lyon to host the Games.

1968 Summer Olympics bidding results
City	Country	Round 1
Mexico City	Mexico	30
Detroit	United States	14
Lyon	France	12
Buenos Aires	Argentina	2

== Olympic torch relay ==
The 1968 torch relay recreated the route taken by Christopher Columbus to the New World, journeying from Greece through Italy and Spain to San Salvador Island, Bahamas, and then on to Mexico. American sculptor James Metcalf, an expatriate in Mexico, won the commission to forge the Olympic torch for the 1968 Summer Games.

== Visual identity ==
The logo is viewed as a Mexican cultural icon. Inspired by the Olympic rings symbol, the five circles are incorporated into the year number 68 and unified with the word Mexico. The radiating parallel lines were extended to fit the poster format. This graphic design was printed in various vibrant colors and certain text with circular imagery. It was the subject of dispute between American designer Lance Wyman and Mexican architect Pedro Ramírez Vázquez over who originated the graphic concepts. Architect Eduardo Terrazas also worked under Ramirez's direction to develop the concept. A pink chacmool jaguar, which was sold in souvenir shops, is considered an unofficial mascot. The dove of peace was also a symbol of the Games, which was appropriated by student protesters with a bayonet piercing it.

== Olympic venues ==
- Agustín Melgar Olympic Velodrome – Cycling (track)
- Arena México – Boxing
- Avándaro Golf Club – Equestrian (eventing)
- Campo Marte – Equestrian (dressage, jumping individual)
- Campo Militar 1 – Modern pentathlon (riding, running)
- Club de Yates de Acapulco – Sailing
- Estadio Azteca – Football (final)
- Estadio Cuauhtémoc – Football preliminaries
- Estadio Nou Camp – Football preliminaries
- Estadio Olímpico Universitario – Athletics (also 20 km and 50 km walk), Ceremonies (opening / closing), Equestrian (jumping team)
- Fernando Montes de Oca Fencing Hall – Fencing, Modern pentathlon (fencing)
- Francisco Márquez Olympic Pool – Diving, Modern pentathlon (swimming), Swimming, Water polo
- Arena Insurgentes – Wrestling
- Insurgentes Theatre – Weightlifting
- Jalisco Stadium – Football preliminaries
- Juan de la Barrera Olympic Gymnasium – Volleyball
- Juan Escutia Sports Palace – Basketball, Volleyball; the Sports Palace was completed time in 1968. Designed by Félix Candela, this sports venue allowed for the unashamed transmission of televised (TV) imagery. But venues of pre-Olympic origin were also designed into this sports event
- Municipal Stadium – Field hockey
- National Auditorium – Gymnastics
- Arena Revolución – Volleyball
- Satellite Circuit – Cycling (individual road race, road team time trial)
- University City Swimming Pool – Water polo
- Vicente Suárez Shooting Range – Modern pentathlon (shooting), Shooting
- Virgilio Uribe Rowing and Canoeing Course – Canoeing, Rowing
- Zócalo – Athletics (marathon start)
- Olympic Village – Villa Olímpica and Villa Coapa were constructed in 1968 to accommodate athletes and delegations and were later converted into residential complexes

== Highlights ==
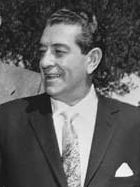
Adolfo López Mateos, President of Mexico from 1958 to 1964 and first chairman of the Organization Committee of the 1968 Summer Olympics

- In the medal award ceremony for the men's 200 metres race, Black American athletes Tommie Smith (gold) and John Carlos (bronze) took a stand for civil rights by raising their black-gloved fists and wearing black socks in lieu of shoes. The Australian Peter Norman, who had run second, wore an American "human rights" badge as a gesture of support to them on the podium. In response, the IOC banned Smith and Carlos from the Olympic Games for life, and Norman's omission from Australia's Olympic team in 1972 was allegedly as punishment.
- George Foreman won the gold medal in heavyweight boxing division by defeating Soviet Jonas Čepulis via a second-round TKO. After the victory, Foreman waved a small American flag as he bowed to the crowd.
- The high elevation of Mexico City, at 2,240 m (7,350 ft) above sea level, influenced many of the events, particularly in track and field. No other Summer Olympic Games before or since have been held at high elevation.
- In addition to high elevation, this was the first Olympics to use a synthetic all-weather surface for track and field events; the "Tartan" surface was originally developed by 3M for horse racing, but did not catch on. The tracks at previous Olympics were conventional cinder.
- For the first time, East and West Germany competed as separate teams, after being forced by the IOC to compete as a combined German team in 1956, 1960, and 1964.
- Al Oerter won his fourth consecutive gold medal in the discus to become only the second athlete to achieve this feat in an individual event, and the first in athletics.
- Bob Beamon leapt 8.90 m (29 ft 2.39 in) in the long jump, an incredible 55 cm (22 in) improvement over the previous world record. It stood as the world record for 23 years, until broken by American Mike Powell in 1991; yet it has stood as the current Olympic record for 58 years.
- Jim Hines, Tommie Smith and Lee Evans also set long-standing world records in the 100 m, 200 m and 400 m, respectively.
- In the triple jump, the previous world record was improved five times by three different athletes. Winner Viktor Saneev also won in 1972 and 1976, and won silver in 1980.
- Dick Fosbury won the gold medal in the high jump using his unconventional Fosbury flop technique, which quickly became the dominant technique in the event.
- Věra Čáslavská of Czechoslovakia won four gold medals in gymnastics and protested the Soviet invasion of her country.
- Debbie Meyer became the first swimmer to win three individual gold medals, in the 200, 400 and 800 m freestyle events. The 800 m was a new long-distance event for women. Meyer was only 16 years old, a student at Rio Americano High School in Sacramento, California. Meyer was the first of several American teenagers to win the 800 m, with Katie Ledecky being her notable successor.
- American swimmer Charlie Hickcox won three gold medals (200 m IM, 400 m IM and 4 × 100 m medley relay) and one silver medal (100 m backstroke).
- The introduction of doping tests resulted in the first disqualification because of doping: Swedish pentathlete Hans-Gunnar Liljenwall was disqualified for alcohol use (he drank several beers just prior to competing).
- John Stephen Akhwari of Tanzania became internationally famous after finishing the marathon, in the last place, despite a dislocated knee.
- This was the first of three Olympic participation by Jacques Rogge. He competed in yachting and would later become the president of the IOC.
- Norma Enriqueta Basilio de Sotelo of Mexico became the first woman to light the Olympic cauldron with the Olympic flame.
- It was the first games at which there was a significant African presence in men's distance running. Africans won at least one medal in all running events from 800 meters to the marathon, and in so doing they set a trend for future games. Most of these runners came from high-altitude areas of countries like Kenya and Ethiopia, and they were well-prepared for the 2240 m elevation of Mexico City.
- Kipchoge Keino of Kenya, competing in spite of unexpected bouts of severe abdominal pain later diagnosed as a gall bladder infection, finished the 10,000 meters in spite of collapsing from pain with two laps to go, won silver in the 5000, and won gold in the 1500 meters.
- It was the first Olympic games in which the closing ceremony was transmitted in color to the world, as well as the events themselves.

== Controversies ==
=== South Africa ===
After being banned from participating in 1964, South Africa - under its new leader John Vorster - had made diplomatic overtures to improve relations with neighboring countries and internationally, suggesting legal changes to allow South Africa to compete with an integrated, multiracial team internationally. The nominal obstacle behind South Africa's exclusion thus removed, the country was thus provisionally invited to the Games, on the understanding that all segregation and discrimination in sport would be eliminated by the 1972 Games. However, African countries and African American athletes promised to boycott the Games if South Africa was present, and Eastern Bloc countries threatened to do likewise. In April 1968 the IOC conceded that "it would be most unwise for South Africa to participate". It was thus the first Olympics where South Africa was positively excluded, which continued until the Olympics of 1992.

=== Tlatelolco massacre ===
Responding to growing social unrest and protests, the government of Mexico had increased economic and political suppression, against labor unions in particular, in the decade building up to the Olympics. A series of protest marches in the city in August gathered significant attendance, with an estimated 500,000 taking part on 27 August. President Gustavo Díaz Ordaz ordered the police occupation of the National Autonomous University of Mexico in September, but protests continued. Using the prominence brought by the Olympics, students gathered in Plaza de las Tres Culturas in Tlatelolco to call for greater civil and democratic rights and showed disdain for the Olympics with slogans such as ¡No queremos olimpiadas, queremos revolución! ("We don't want Olympics, we want revolution!").

Ten days before the start of the Olympics, the government ordered the gathering in Plaza de las Tres Culturas to be broken up. Some 5000 soldiers and 200 tankettes surrounded the plaza. Hundreds of protesters and civilians were killed and over 1000 were arrested. At the time, the event was portrayed in the national media as the military suppression of a violent student uprising, but later analysis indicates that the gathering was peaceful prior to the army's advance.

=== Black Power salute ===
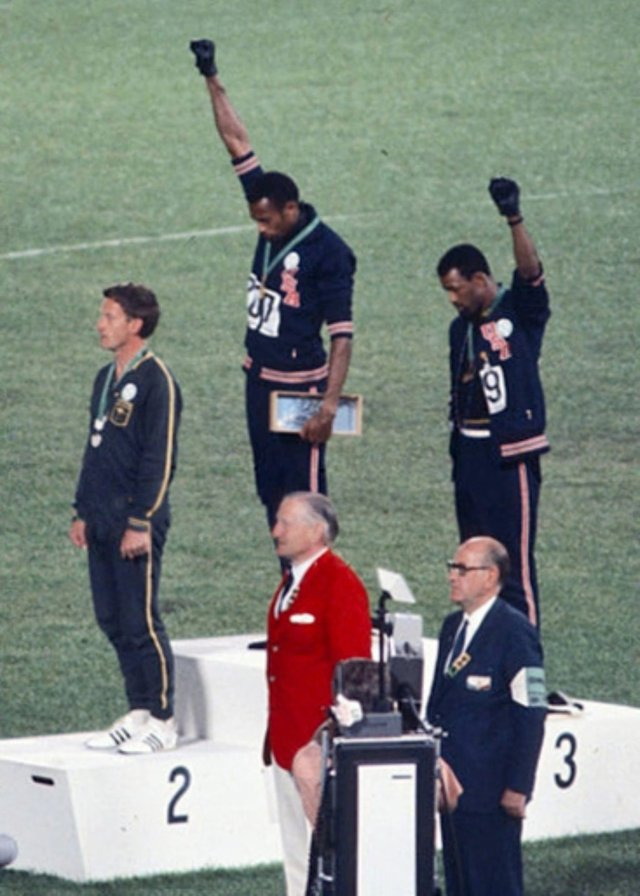
Gold medalist Tommie Smith (center) and bronze medalist John Carlos (right) showing the raised fist on the podium after the 200 m race

On 16 October 1968, African American sprinters Tommie Smith and John Carlos, the gold and bronze medalists in the men's 200-meter race, took their places on the podium for the medal ceremony wearing human rights badges and black socks without shoes, lowered their heads and each raised a black-gloved fist as "The Star Spangled Banner" was played, in solidarity with the Black Freedom Movement in the United States. Both were members of the Olympic Project for Human Rights. International Olympic Committee (IOC) president Avery Brundage deemed it to be a domestic political statement unfit for the apolitical, international forum the Olympic Games were intended to be. In response to their actions, he ordered Smith and Carlos suspended from the US team and banned from the Olympic Village. When the US Olympic Committee refused, Brundage threatened to ban the entire US track team. This threat led to the expulsion of the two athletes from the Games.

Peter Norman, the Australian sprinter who came second in the 200-meter race, also wore an Olympic Project for Human Rights badge during the medal ceremony. Norman was the one who suggested that Carlos and Smith wear one glove each. His actions resulted in him being ostracized by Australian media and a reprimand by his country's Olympic authorities. He was not sent to the 1972 games, despite several times making the qualifying time, though opinions differ over whether that was due to the 1968 protest. When Australia hosted the 2000 Summer Olympics, he had no part in the opening ceremony, though the significance of that is also debated. In 2006, after Norman died of a heart attack, Smith and Carlos were pallbearers at Norman's funeral.

=== Věra Čáslavská and the Soviet invasion of Czechoslovakia ===
In another notable incident in the gymnastics competition, while standing on the medal podium after the balance beam event final, in which Natalia Kuchinskaya of the Soviet Union had controversially taken the gold, Czechoslovak gymnast Věra Čáslavská quietly turned her head down and away during the playing of the Soviet national anthem. The action was Čáslavská's silent protest against the recent Soviet invasion of Czechoslovakia. Her protest was repeated when she accepted her medal for her floor exercise routine when the judges changed the preliminary scores of the Soviet Larisa Petrik to allow her to tie with Čáslavská for the gold. While Čáslavská's countrymen supported her actions and her outspoken opposition to Soviet control (she had publicly signed and supported Ludvik Vaculik's "Two Thousand Words" manifesto), the new regime responded by banning her from both sporting events and international travel for many years and made her an outcast from society until the fall of communist regime in Czechoslovakia.

== Sports ==
The 1968 Summer Olympic program featured 172 events in the following 18 sports:

- Aquatics
  - Diving (4)
  - Swimming (29)
  - Water polo (1)
- Athletics (36)
- Basketball (1)
- Boxing (11)
- Canoeing (7)
- Cycling
  - Road (2)
  - Track (5)
- Equestrian
  - Dressage (2)
  - Eventing (2)
  - Jumping (2)
- Fencing (8)
- Field hockey (1)
- Football (1)
- Gymnastics (14)
- Modern pentathlon (2)
- Rowing (7)
- Sailing (5)
- Shooting (7)
- Volleyball (2)
- Weightlifting (7)
- Wrestling
  - Freestyle (8)
  - Greco-Roman (8)

=== Demonstration sports ===
- Basque pelota (10)
- Tennis (4)

The organizers declined to hold a judo tournament at the Olympics, even though it had been a full-medal sport four years earlier. This was the last time judo was not included in the Olympic games.

Baseball had been featured as a demonstration sport at the 1964 Tokyo Games, but not in 1968, despite Mexico's baseball heritage. Instead, a separate international tournament was held in Mexico City, shortly after the conclusion of the Olympic Games.

== Participating National Olympic Committees ==
East Germany and West Germany competed as separate entities for the first time at a Summer Olympiad, and would remain so through 1988. Barbados competed for the first time as an independent country. Also competing for the first time in a Summer Olympiad were British Honduras (now Belize), Central African Republic, the Democratic Republic of the Congo (as Congo-Kinshasa), El Salvador, Guinea, Honduras, Kuwait, Nicaragua, Paraguay, Sierra Leone, and the United States Virgin Islands. Singapore returned to the Games as an independent country after competing as part of the Malaysian team in 1964. Suriname and Libya actually competed for the first time (in 1960 and 1964, respectively, they took part in the Opening Ceremony, but their athletes later withdrew from the competition). The People's Republic of China last competed at the 1952 Summer Games but had since withdrawn from the IOC due to a dispute with the Republic of China over the right to represent China.

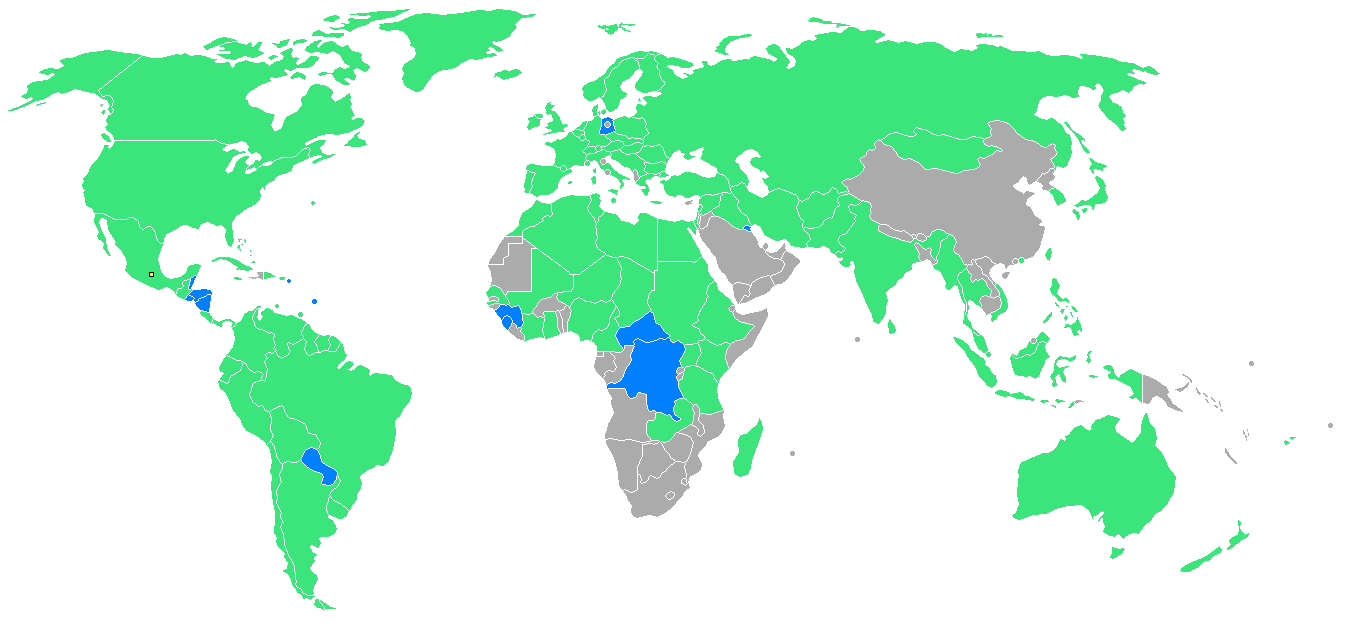
Participating countries

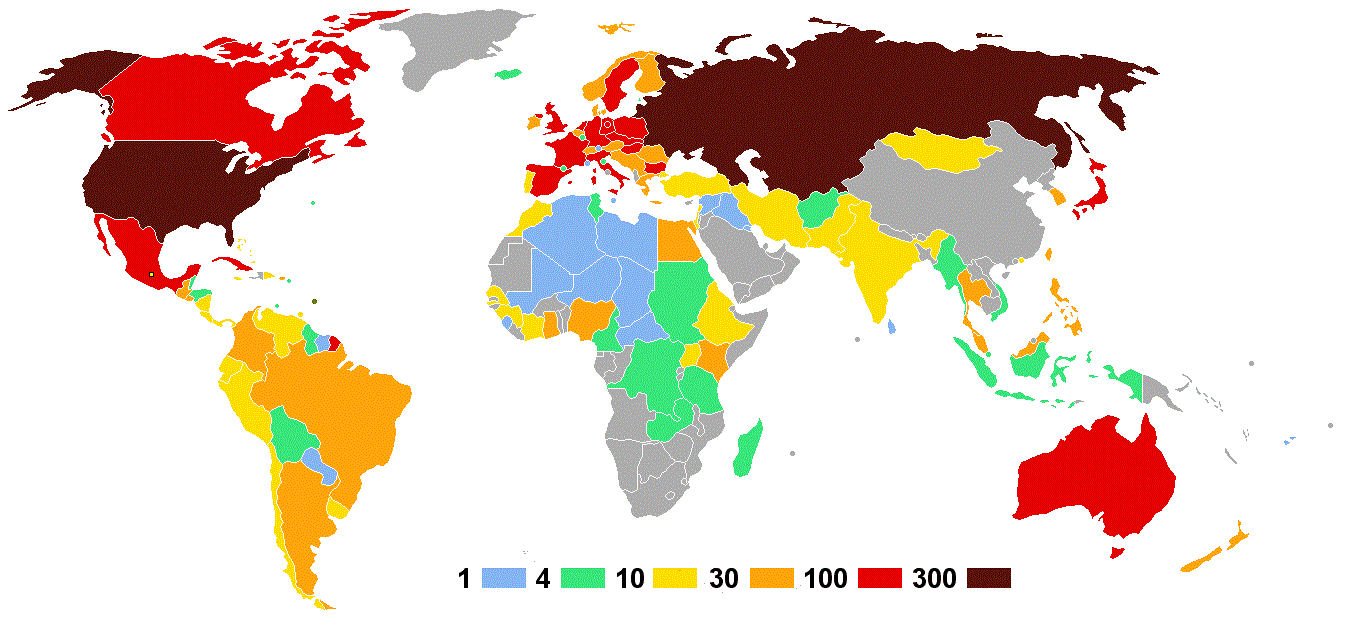
Number of athletes per country

Participating National Olympic Committees
- Afghanistan (5)
- Algeria (3)
- Argentina (89)
- Australia (128)
- Austria (43)
- Bahamas (16)
- Barbados (9)
- Belgium (82)
- Bermuda (6)
- Bolivia (4)
- Brazil (76)
- British Honduras (7)
- Bulgaria (112)
- Burma (4)
- Cameroon (5)
- Canada (138)
- Central African Republic (1)
- Ceylon (3)
- Chad (3)
- Chile (21)
- Colombia (43)
- Congo-Kinshasa (5)
- Costa Rica (18)
- Cuba (115)
- Czechoslovakia (121)
- Denmark (64)
- Dominican Republic (18)
- Ecuador (15)
- Egypt (30)
- El Salvador (60)
- Ethiopia (18)
- Fiji (1)
- Finland (66)
- France (200)
- East Germany (226)
- West Germany (275)
- Ghana (31)
- Great Britain (225)
- Greece (44)
- Guatemala (48)
- Guinea (15)
- Guyana (5)
- Honduras (6)
- Hong Kong (11)
- Hungary (167)
- Iceland (8)
- India (25)
- Indonesia (6)
- Iran (14)
- Iraq (3)
- Ireland (31)
- Israel (29)
- Italy (167)
- Ivory Coast (10)
- Jamaica (25)
- Japan (171)
- Kenya (39)
- South Korea (54)
- Kuwait (2)
- Lebanon (11)
- Libya (1)
- Liechtenstein (2)
- Luxembourg (5)
- Madagascar (4)
- Malaysia (31)
- Mali (2)
- Malta (1)
- Mexico (275) (host)
- Monaco (2)
- Mongolia (16)
- Morocco (24)
- Netherlands (107)
- Netherlands Antilles (5)
- New Zealand (52)
- Nicaragua (11)
- Niger (2)
- Nigeria (36)
- Norway (46)
- Pakistan (15)
- Panama (16)
- Paraguay (1)
- Peru (28)
- Philippines (49)
- Poland (177)
- Portugal (20)
- Puerto Rico (58)
- Romania (82)
- San Marino (4)
- Senegal (21)
- Sierra Leone (3)
- Singapore (4)
- Soviet Union (312)
- Spain (122)
- Sudan (5)
- Suriname (1)
- Sweden (100)
- Switzerland (85)
- Syria (2)
- Taiwan (43)
- Tanzania (4)
- Thailand (41)
- Trinidad and Tobago (19)
- Tunisia (7)
- Turkey (29)
- Uganda (11)
- United States (357)
- Uruguay (27)
- Venezuela (23)
- Vietnam (9)
- Virgin Islands (6)
- Yugoslavia (69)
- Zambia (7)

=== Number of athletes by National Olympic Committees ===
IOC Letter Code	Country	Athletes
USA	United States	357
URS	Soviet Union	312
ALE	West Germany	275
MEX	Mexico	275
ODE	East Germany	226
GBR	Great Britain	225
FRA	France	200
POL	Poland	177
JPN	Japan	171
HUN	Hungary	167
ITA	Italy	167
CAN	Canada	138
AUS	Australia	128
ESP	Spain	122
CHE	Czechoslovakia	121
CUB	Cuba	115
BUL	Bulgaria	112
HOL	Netherlands	107
SUE	Sweden	100
ARG	Argentina	89
SUI	Switzerland	85
BEL	Belgium	82
RUM	Romania	82
BRA	Brazil	76
YUG	Yugoslavia	69
FIN	Finland	66
DIN	Denmark	64
SAL	El Salvador	60
PRI	Puerto Rico	58
COR	South Korea	54
NZL	New Zealand	52
FIL	Philippines	49
GUA	Guatemala	48
NOR	Norway	46
GRE	Greece	44
AUT	Austria	43
COL	Colombia	43
TWN	Taiwan	43
THA	Thailand	41
KEN	Kenya	39
NGR	Nigeria	36
GHA	Ghana	31
IRL	Ireland	31
MAS	Malaysia	31
RAU	Egypt	30
ISR	Israel	29
TUR	Turkey	29
PER	Peru	28
URG	Uruguay	27
IND	India	25
JAM	Jamaica	25
MAR	Morocco	24
VEN	Venezuela	23
CHI	Chile	21
SEN	Senegal	21
POR	Portugal	20
TRI	Trinidad and Tobago	19
CRC	Costa Rica	18
DOM	Dominican Republic	18
ETI	Ethiopia	18
BAH	Bahamas	16
MGL	Mongolia	16
PAN	Panama	16
ECU	Ecuador	15
GUI	Guinea	15
PAK	Pakistan	15
IRN	Iran	14
HOK	Hong Kong	11
LIB	Lebanon	11
NIC	Nicaragua	11
UGA	Uganda	11
CML	Ivory Coast	10
BAR	Barbados	9
VNM	Vietnam	9
ISL	Iceland	8
HBR	British Honduras	7
TUN	Tunisia	7
ZAM	Zambia	7
BER	Bermuda	6
HON	Honduras	6
INA	Indonesia	6
ISV	Virgin Islands	6
AFG	Afghanistan	5
CMR	Cameroon	5
COK	Congo-Kinshasa	5
GUY	Guyana	5
LUX	Luxembourg	5
AHO	Netherlands Antilles	5
SUD	Sudan	5
BOL	Bolivia	4
BIR	Burma	4
MAD	Madagascar	4
SMR	San Marino	4
SIN	Singapore	4
TAN	Tanzania	4
AGL	Algeria	3
CEI	Ceylon	3
CHA	Chad	3
IRK	Iraq	3
SLA	Sierra Leone	3
KUW	Kuwait	2
LIE	Liechtenstein	2
MLI	Mali	2
MON	Monaco	2
NIG	Niger	2
SIR	Syria	2
AFC	Central African Republic	1
FIJ	Fiji	1
LBA	Libya	1
MLT	Malta	1
PAR	Paraguay	1
SUR	Suriname	1
Total		5,516

== Calendar ==
All dates are in Central Time Zone (UTC-6)

OC	Opening ceremony	●	Event competitions	1	Gold medal events	CC	Closing ceremony

October 1968		12th Sat	13th Sun	14th Mon	15th Tue	16th Wed	17th Thu	18th Fri	19th Sat	20th Sun	21st Mon	22nd Tue	23rd Wed	24th Thu	25th Fri	26th Sat	27th Sun	Events
Ceremonies		OC															CC	—N/a
Aquatics
Aquatics	Diving						●	1	●	1		●	1	●	●	1		33
Aquatics	Swimming						2	●	4	3	3	3	4	4	3	3		33
Aquatics	Water polo			●	●	●	●		●	●	●	●	●	●	●	1		33
Athletics			1	4	4	7	6	5	2	7								36
Basketball			●	●	●	●		●	●	●		●	1					1
Boxing			●	●	●	●	●	●		●	●	●	●	●		11		11
Canoeing												●	●	●	7			7
Cycling	Road cycling				1								1					7
Cycling	Track cycling						1	1	1	●	2							7
Equestrian								●	●	●	2		1	1	1		1	6
Fencing					●	1	1	●	1	1	1	1	●	1	1			8
Field hockey			●	●	●	●	●	●	●	●	●		●	●	●	1		1
Football			●	●	●	●	●	●		●		●		●		1		1
Gymnastics											●	●	2	2	4	6		14
Modern pentathlon			●	●	●	●	2											2
Rowing			●		●		●	●	7									7
Sailing				●	●	●	●		●	●	5							5
Shooting								2	1		1	1	2					7
Volleyball			●	●	●	●	●		●	●	●		●	●	●	2		2
Weightlifting			1	1	1	1	1	1	1									7
Wrestling							●	●	●	8			●	●	●	8		16
Daily medal events			2	5	6	9	13	10	17	20	14	5	12	8	16	34	1	172
Cumulative total			2	7	13	22	35	45	62	82	96	101	113	121	137	171	172	172
October 1968		12th Sat	13th Sun	14th Mon	15th Tue	16th Wed	17th Thu	18th Fri	19th Sat	20th Sun	21st Mon	22nd Tue	23rd Wed	24th Thu	25th Fri	26th Sat	27th Sun	Total events

== Boycotting countries ==
North Korea withdrew from the 1968 Games because of two incidents that strained its relations with the IOC. First, the IOC had barred North Korean track and field athletes from the 1968 Games because they had participated in the rival Games of the New Emerging Forces (GANEFO) in 1966. Secondly, the IOC had ordered the nation to compete under the name "North Korea" in the 1968 Games, whereas the country itself would have preferred its official name: "Democratic People's Republic of Korea".

== Medal count ==
These are the top ten nations that won medals at the 1968 Games. Host Mexico won nine medals in total.

Rank	Nation	Gold	Silver	Bronze	Total
1	United States	45	28	34	107
2	Soviet Union	29	32	30	91
3	Japan	11	7	7	25
4	Hungary	10	10	12	32
5	East Germany	9	9	7	25
6	France	7	3	5	15
7	Czechoslovakia	7	2	4	13
8	West Germany	5	11	10	26
9	Australia	5	7	5	17
10	Great Britain	5	5	3	13
Totals (10 entries)		133	114	117	364

== See also ==
- 1968 Summer Paralympics
- 1968 Winter Olympics
- List of IOC country codes
- 1968 Olympics Black Power salute

== Bibliography ==
- José Rogelio Alvarez, MEXICO 68. Official Report of the 1968 Olympic Games. Produced by the Organizing Committee of the Games of the XIX Olympiad. Volume 1–5 (4+1 Official Souveniers[sic]), Mexico City 1969. (french/english, spanish/german) Supplement: Volume 2b – Final report, Mexico City 1969. (spanish)
  - Organizing Committee of the Games of the XIX Olympiad, MEXICO 68: Official Report of the 1968 Olympic Games. Volume 1 – The country. Mexico City 1969. (french/english)
  - Organizing Committee of the Games of the XIX Olympiad, MEXICO 68: Official Report of the 1968 Olympic Games. Volume 2 – The organization. Mexico City 1969. (french/english)
  - Organizing Committee of the Games of the XIX Olympiad, MEXICO 68: Official Report of the 1968 Olympic Games. Volume 3 – The games. Mexico City 1969. (french/english)
  - Organizing Committee of the Games of the XIX Olympiad, MEXICO 68: Official Report of the 1968 Olympic Games. Volume 4 – The cultural Olympiad. Mexico City 1969. (french/english)

Summer Olympics
Preceded by Tokyo	XIX Olympiad; Mexico City; 1968	Succeeded by Munich
