= Modern pentathlon at the 2016 Summer Olympics – Qualification =

This article details the qualifying phase for modern pentathlon at the 2016 Summer Olympics. Thirty-six athletes per gender must qualify for the Games, with only a maximum of two each per NOC. Qualification methods are similarly applied to both men's and women's events.

Host nation Brazil has been guaranteed one quota place automatically, while two invitational positions are distributed by the UIPM once the rest of the qualifiers are announced and thereby decided.

The initial distribution of berths to the athletes based on competition results occur between January and August 2015. One place will be handily awarded to the winner of the 2015 UIPM World Cup final. Twenty places are determined by the continental championships: one each from Africa and Oceania, five from Asia, eight from Europe, and five from the Americas with a maximum of one quota per NOC (winners from NORCECA and South America, and top three from the 2015 Pan American Games in Toronto, Canada).

Three places have been reserved to the highest-ranked athletes at each of the 2015 and 2016 UIPM World Championships. The remaining seven will be awarded based on the pentathlon's world rankings, unless a reallocation of unused berths have been invoked before the deadline.

== Men's ==
Individual athletes may qualify in any of the following methods, ensuring that an NOC may enter up to a maximum of two in each event. If more than two athletes are eligible to compete, a non-selected quota has been redistributed.

Event	Date	Venue	Places	Qualified athletes
Host nation	—	—	1	Felipe Nascimento (BRA)
2015 UIPM World Cup Final	June 12–14, 2015	(Belarus) Minsk	1	Riccardo de Luca (ITA)
Asian/Oceania Championships	June 1–5, 2015	(China) Beijing	5	Jun Woong-tae (KOR); ~~Lee Dong-gi (KOR)~~; ~~Su Haihang (CHN)~~; Cao Zhongrong (CHN); ~~Hwang Woo-jin (KOR)~~
Asian/Oceania Championships	June 1–5, 2015	(China) Beijing	1	Max Esposito (AUS)
2015 Pan American Games	July 18–19, 2015	(Canada) Toronto	1	Charles Fernández (GUA)
2015 Pan American Games	July 18–19, 2015	(Canada) Toronto	1	Emmanuel Zapata (ARG)
2015 Pan American Games	July 18–19, 2015	(Canada) Toronto	3	Ismael Hernández (MEX); Nathan Schrimsher (USA); José Figueroa (CUB)
European Championships	August 17–23, 2015	(United Kingdom) Bath	8	Arthur Lanigan-O'Keeffe (IRL); Valentin Prades (FRA); David Svoboda (CZE); ~~Róbert Kasza (HUN)~~; ~~Egor Puchkarevskiy (RUS)~~; Joe Choong (GBR); Valentin Belaud (FRA); Jan Kuf (CZE)
African Championships	August 21–23, 2015	(Egypt) Cairo	1	~~Eslam Hamad (EGY)~~; Amro El-Geziry (EGY)
2015 UIPM World Championships	June 28 – July 6, 2015	(Germany) Berlin	3	Pavlo Tymoshchenko (UKR); Aleksander Lesun (RUS); Andriy Fedechko (UKR)
2016 UIPM World Championships	May 23–29, 2016	(Russia) Moscow	0	—
Pentathlon World Ranking	June 1, 2016	—	11	James Cooke (GBR); Omar El-Geziry (EGY); Ádám Marosi (HUN); ~~Maksim Kustov (RUS)~~; Jung Jin-hwa (KOR); Justinas Kinderis (LTU); ~~Yasser Hefny (EGY)~~; Guo Jianli (CHN); Bence Demeter (HUN); Pierpaolo Petroni (ITA); Patrick Dogue (GER)
Tripartite Invitation	—	—	—	—
Re-allocation of unused quota places	June 16, 2016	—	7	Tomoya Miguchi (JPN)^ Dimitar Krastanov (BUL)^ Szymon Staśkiewicz (POL)^ Shohei Iwamoto (JPN)^ Christian Zillekens (GER); Pavel Ilyashenko (KAZ)^ Ruslan Nakoņečnijs (LAT)
Total			36	

- ^ Unused quota place through the respective Continental Championships

== Women's ==
Individual athletes may qualify in any of the following methods, ensuring that an NOC may enter up to a maximum of two in each event. If more than two athletes are eligible to compete, a non-selected quota has been redistributed.

Event	Date	Venue	Places	Qualified athletes
2015 UIPM World Cup Final	June 12–14, 2015	(Belarus) Minsk	1	Laura Asadauskaitė (LTU)
Asia & Oceania Championships	June 1–5, 2015	(China) Beijing	5	Chen Qian (CHN); Kim Sun-woo (KOR); ~~Liang Wanxia (CHN)~~; Zhang Xiaonan (CHN); Natsumi Tomonaga (JPN)
Asia & Oceania Championships	June 1–5, 2015	(China) Beijing	1	Chloe Esposito (AUS)
2015 Pan American Games	July 18–19, 2015	(Canada) Toronto	1	Yane Marques (BRA)
2015 Pan American Games	July 18–19, 2015	(Canada) Toronto	1	Tamara Vega (MEX)
2015 Pan American Games	July 18–19, 2015	(Canada) Toronto	3	Donna Vakalis (CAN); Isabel Brand (GUA); Leydi Moya (CUB)
European Championships	August 17–23, 2015	(United Kingdom) Bath	8	Élodie Clouvel (FRA); Lena Schöneborn (GER); Gulnaz Gubaydullina (RUS); Oktawia Nowacka (POL); ~~Janine Kohlmann (GER)~~; Anastasiya Spas (UKR); Kate French (GBR); Alice Sotero (ITA)
African Championships	August 21–23, 2015	(Egypt) Cairo	1	Haydy Morsy (EGY)
2015 UIPM World Championships	June 28 – July 6, 2015	(Germany) Berlin	3	Donata Rimšaitė (RUS); Samantha Murray (GBR); Sarolta Kovács (HUN)
2016 UIPM World Championships	May 23–29, 2016	(Russia) Moscow	0	—
Pentathlon World Ranking	June 1, 2016	—	11	Zsófia Földházi (HUN); Claudia Cesarini (ITA); Anastasiya Prokopenko (BLR); Ieva Serapinaitė (LTU); ~~Freyja Prentice (GBR)~~; Iryna Khokhlova (ARG); Melanie McCann (CAN); ~~Gintarė Venčkauskaitė (LTU)~~; Margaux Isaksen (USA); Annika Schleu (GER); ~~Anna Buriak (RUS)~~
Tripartite Invitation	—	—	0	—
Re-allocation of unused quota places	June 16, 2016	—	6	Yelena Potapenko (KAZ)^ Anna Maliszewska (POL)° İlke Özyüksel (TUR); Isabella Isaksen (USA); Natalya Coyle (IRL)^ Barbora Kodedová (CZE)
Total			36	

- ° Unused host quota place
- ^ Unused quota place through the respective Continental Championships
