= 2013 in modern pentathlon =

This article lists the main modern pentathlon events and their results for 2013.

== 2014 YOG qualification events ==
- September 20 – 23: YOG 2014 Continental Qualifier - Europe in (Portugal) Caldas da Rainha
  - Youth Individual winners: (Russia) Danila Glavatskikh (m) / (Lithuania) Aurelija Tamasauskaite (f)
  - Youth Mixed Team Relay winners: Ukraine (Yana Polishchuk & Vladyslav Rydvanskyi)
- September 27 & 28: YOG 2014 Continental Qualifier - Asia & Oceania in Astana
  - Youth Individual winners: (China) LI Shuhuan (m) / (China) WEI Danni (f)
  - Youth Men's Team Relay winners: China (CHEN Shixing, LI Shuhuan, XU Zhuocheng, & PENG Shiyi)
  - Youth Women's Team Relay winners: China (WEI Danni, ZHENG Lishan, ZHONG Xiuting, & SHAO Xiaoyu)
  - Youth Mixed Team Relay winners: Kazakhstan
  - Youth Men's Team winners: China (XU Zhuocheng, CHEN Shixing, & LI Shuhuan)
  - Youth Women's Team winners: China (SHAO Xiaoyu, ZHONG Xiuting, & WEI Danni)
- November 8 – 10: YOG 2014 Continental Qualifier - Africa in (Ivory Coast) Abidjan
  - Youth Individual winners: (Egypt) Sherif Nazeir (m) / (Egypt) Sondos Aboubakr (f)
  - Youth Mixed Team Relay winners: Egypt
  - Youth Men's Team winners: Egypt (Abdelrahman Alian, Youssef Abdelaziz, & Sherif Nazeir)
  - Youth Women's Team winners: Egypt (Nada Elhodhod, Haydy Morsy, & Sondos Aboubakr)
- November 30 & December 1: YOG 2014 Continental Qualifier - Pan America in Acapulco
  - Youth Individual winners: (Mexico) Ricardo Vera (m) / (Hungary) Anna Zs. Toth (f)
  - Youth Women's Team winners: Mexico (Xochitl Olivares, Martha Derrant, & Maria Ramirez)

== World modern pentathlon championships ==
- July 25 – 30: 2013 World Junior Modern Pentathlon Championships in Székesfehérvár
  - Junior Individual winners: (Ukraine) Denys Pavlyuk (m) / (Hungary) Zsófia Földházi (f)
  - Junior Men's Team Relay winners: France (Valentin Belaud, Alexandre Henrard, & Andy Genard)
  - Junior Women's Team Relay winners: Great Britain (Joanna Muir, Alice Fitton, & Kerry Prise)
  - Junior Mixed Team Relay winners: Belarus (Katsiaryna Arol & Dzianis Zeliankevich)
  - Junior Men's Team winners: Hungary (Istvan Malits, Bence Harangozo, & Gergely Demeter)
  - Junior Women's Team winners: Mexico (Mariana Arceo, Mayan Oliver, & Tamara Vega)
- August 8 – 12: 2013 World Youth "A" Modern Pentathlon Championships in Wuhan
  - Youth Individual winners: (Germany) Christian Zillekens (m) / (Lithuania) Ieva Serapinaitė (f)
  - Youth Men's Team Relay winners: South Korea (Jun Woong-tae, LEE Ji-hun, & LEE Dong-gi)
  - Youth Women's Team Relay winners: China (WEI Danni, SHAO Xiaoyu, & ZHONG Xiuting)
  - Youth Mixed Team Relay winners: Russia (Sofia Serkina & Alexander Lifanov)
  - Youth Men's Team winners: Hungary (Gergő Bruckmann, Krisztian Strobl, & Soma Tomaschof)
  - Youth Women's Team winners: China (ZHONG Xiuting, SHAO Xiaoyu, & WEI Danni)
- August 19 – 28: 2013 World Modern Pentathlon Championships in (Chinese Taipei) Kaohsiung
  - Individual winners: (Lithuania) Justinas Kinderis (m) / (Lithuania) Laura Asadauskaitė (f)
  - Men's Team Relay winners: Hungary (Bence Demeter, Róbert Kasza, & Ádám Marosi)
  - Women's Team Relay winners: Ukraine (Ganna Buriak, Iryna Khokhlova, & Victoria Tereshchuk)
  - Mixed Team Relay winners: France (Élodie Clouvel & Valentin Belaud)
  - Men's Team winners: France (Jean Maxence Berrou, Christopher Patte, & Valentin Prades)
  - Women's Team winners: Great Britain (Kate French, Samantha Murray, & Mhairi Spence)

== Continental modern pentathlon championships ==
- June 12 – 16: 2013 European Youth "B" Modern Pentathlon Championships (Tetrathlon) in (Belarus) Minsk
  - Youth Individual winners: (Russia) Alexandr Stepachev (m) / (Turkey) İlke Özyüksel (f)
  - Youth Men's Team Relay winners: Russia (Alexandr Stepachev, Igor Krivitckii, & Ivan Tarasov)
  - Youth Women's Team Relay winners: Russia (Adelina Ibatullina, Arina Koritcina, & Ekaterina Utina)
  - Youth Mixed Team Relay winners: Russia (Xeina Fralcova & Serge Baranov)
  - Youth Men's Team winners: Russia (Timur Galimov, Serge Baranov, & Alexandr Stepachev)
  - Youth Women's Team winners: Russia (Ekaterina Utina, Adelina Ibatullina, & Xeina Fralcova)
- June 18 – 24: 2013 European Junior Modern Pentathlon Championships in (Bulgaria) Sofia
  - Junior Individual winners: (Russia) Egor Puchkarevskiy (m) / (Belarus) Katsiaryna Arol (f)
  - Junior Men's Team Relay winners: Russia (Dmitry Suslov, Alexander Kukarin, & Danil Kalimullin)
  - Junior Women's Team Relay winners: France (Pulcherie Delhalle, Julie Belhamri, & Adele Stern)
  - Junior Mixed Team Relay winners: Russia (Gulnaz Gubaydullina & Ilya Shugarov)
  - Junior Men's Team winners: Russia (Oleg Naumov, Kirill Belyakov, & Egor Puchkarevskiy)
  - Junior Women's Team winners: Russia (Alexandra Savvina, Gulnaz Gubaydullina, & Anastasia Bugrina)
- July 11 – 14: 2013 NORCECA Senior & Junior Modern Pentathlon Championships in (Dominican Republic) Santo Domingo
  - Individual winners: (Cuba) José Figueroa (m) / (Cuba) Leydi Moya (f)
  - Junior Individual winners: (Guatemala) Charles Fernandez (m) / (Cuba) Leydi Moya (f)
- July 11 – 17: 2013 European Modern Pentathlon Championships in (Poland) Drzonków
  - Individual winners: (Hungary) Ádám Marosi (m) / (Hungary) Zsófia Földházi (f)
  - Men's Team Relay winners: France (Valentin Belaud, Geoffrey Megi, & Valentin Prades)
  - Women's Team Relay winners: Great Britain (Samantha Murray, Kate French, & Katy Burke)
  - Mixed Team Relay winners: Ukraine (Victoria Tereshchuk & Pavlo Tymoshchenko)
  - Men's Team winners: Hungary (Bence Demeter, Róbert Kasza, & Ádám Marosi)
  - Women's Team winners: Great Britain (Mhairi Spence, Kate French, & Samantha Murray)
- July 18 – 21: 2013 European Youth "A" Modern Pentathlon Championships in (Russia) Saint Petersburg
  - Youth Individual winners: (France) Brice Loubet (m) / (United Kingdom) Eilidh Prise (f)
  - Youth Men's Team Relay winners: France (Brice Loubet, Stanislas Huet, & Gregory Flayols)
  - Youth Women's Team Relay winners: Lithuania (Ieva Serapinaitė, Emilija Serapinaitė, & Aurelija Tamasauskaitė)
  - Youth Mixed Team Relay winners: Germany (Alexandra Bettinelli & Christian Zillekens)
  - Youth Men's Team winners: Czech Republic (Marek Grycz, Martin Vlach, & Eizens Poiss)
  - Youth Women's Team winners: Italy (Aurora Tognetti, Irene Prampolini, & Francesca Tognetti)
- September 28 – October 3: 2013 Asian Modern Pentathlon Championships in Astana
  - Individual winners: (Kazakhstan) Pavel Ilyashenko (m) / (China) Chen Qian (f)
  - Men's Team Relay winners: South Korea (LEE Woo-jin, Jung Jin-hwa, & Hwang Woo-jin)
  - Women's Team Relay winners: China (LIANG Wanxia, Zhang Xiaonan, & Chen Qian)
  - Mixed Team Relay winners: China
  - Men's Team winners: Kazakhstan (Andrey Soldatov, Rustem Sabirkhuzin, & Pavel Ilyashenko)
  - Women's Team winners: China (LIANG Wanxia, WANG Wei, & Chen Qian)
  - Junior Individual winners: (South Korea) Kim Dae-beom (m) / (China) WANG Wei (f)
- November 6 – 11: 2013 South American Modern Pentathlon Championships in (Chile) Santiago
  - Individual winners: (Chile) Esteban Bustos (m) / (Argentina) Ayelen Zapata (f)
  - Mixed Team Relay winners: Argentina (Ayelen Zapata & Emmanuel Zapata)
  - Youth Individual winners: (Brazil) Yan Freitas (m) / (Chile) Javiera Rosas (f)

== 2013 Modern Pentathlon World Cup ==
- February 20 – 24: MPWC #1 in (United States) Palm Springs
  - Individual winners: (Russia) Aleksander Lesun (m) / (Ukraine) Victoria Tereshchuk (f)
  - Mixed Team Relay winners: Hungary (Leila Gyenesei & Ádám Marosi)
- March 20 – 24: MPWC #2 in (Brazil) Rio de Janeiro
  - Individual winners: (Hungary) Ádám Marosi (m) / (United States) Margaux Isaksen (f)
  - Mixed Team Relay winners: Russia (Ekaterina Khuraskina & Aleksander Lesun)
- April 17 – 21: MPWC #3 in (China) Chengdu
  - Individual winners: (Ukraine) Pavlo Tymoshchenko (m) / (Ukraine) Ganna Buriak (f)
  - Mixed Team Relay winners: Belarus (Hanna Vasilionak & Raman Pinchuk)
- May 8 & 9: MPWC #4 in Budapest
  - Individual winners: (United Kingdom) James Cooke (m) / (Ukraine) Ganna Buriak (f)
  - Mixed Team Relay winners: Hungary (Leila Gyenesei & Ádám Marosi)
- May 31 – June 2: MPWC #5 (final) in (Russia) Nizhny Novgorod
  - Individual winners: (France) Valentin Prades (m) / (Ukraine) Victoria Tereshchuk (f)
  - Mixed Team Relay winners: Latvia (Jeļena Rubļevska & Deniss Čerkovskis)
