= 2014 in modern pentathlon =

This article lists the main modern pentathlon events and their results for 2014.

== Youth Olympic Games ==
- August 21 – 25: Modern pentathlon at the 2014 Summer Youth Olympics
  - Boys' Individual: (gold) (Russia) Aleksandr Lifanov; (silver) (Hungary) Gergely Regos; (bronze) (Lithuania) Dovydas Vaivada
  - Girls' Individual: (gold) (China) ZHONG Xiuting; (silver) (United Kingdom) Francesca Summers; (bronze) (Germany) Anna Matthes
  - Mixed International Team Relay: (gold) (Portugal) Maria Migueis Teixeira & (Ukraine) Anton Kuznetsov; (silver) (Hungary) Anna Zs Tóth & (Mexico) Ricardo Vera; (bronze) (Italy) Aurora Tognetti & (South Korea) PARK Gil-ung

== Other multi-sport events (Modern Pentathlon) ==
- March 7 – 9: 2014 ODESUR Modern Pentathlon Championships in Santiago
  - Individual winners: (Brazil) Felipe Nascimento (m) / (Brazil) Yane Marques (f)
  - Mixed Team Relay winners: Chile (Esteban Bustos & Javiera Rosas)
- October 2 & 3: Modern pentathlon at the 2014 Asian Games
  - Individual winners: (China) Guo Jianli (m) / (China) Chen Qian (f)
  - Men's Team winners: China (SU Haihang, Guo Jianli, & HAN Jiahao)
  - Women's Team winners: South Korea (Kim Sun-woo, JEONG Mi-na, & CHOI Min-ji)
- November 14 – 18: Modern pentathlon at the 2014 Central American and Caribbean Games
  - Individual winners: (Mexico) Ismael Hernández (m) / (Cuba) Leydi Moya (f)
  - Team Relay winners: Mexico (Ismael Hernández & Saúl Rivera) (m) / Guatemala (Ximena Dieguez & Sophia Hernández) (f)
  - Women's Team winners: Mexico (Tamara Vega, Thelma Martinez, & Elena Nogueda)

== World modern pentathlon championships ==
- May 14 – 19: 2014 World Youth "A" Modern Pentathlon Championships at (Hungary) Budapest
  - Youth Individual winners: (Ukraine) Anton Kuznetsov (m) / (Italy) Aurora Tognetti (f)
  - Youth Team Relay winners: Russia (Alexandr Stepachev & Sergey Suslov) (m) / Italy (Irene Prampolini & Aurora Tognetti) (f)
  - Youth Mixed Team Relay winners: Belarus (Iryna Prasiantsova & Yaraslau Radziuk)
  - Youth Men's Team winners: Mexico (Luis Cruz, Emiliano Hernandez, & Ricardo Vera)
  - Youth Women's Team winners: Great Britain (Francesca Summers, Eilidh Prise, & Kerenza Bryson)
- May 20 – 26: 2014 World Junior Modern Pentathlon Championships at (Poland) Drzonków
  - Junior Individual winners: (Russia) Egor Puchkarevskiy (m) / (Hungary) Zsófia Földházi (f)
  - Junior Team Relay winners: Germany (Christian Zillekens & Marvin Faly Dogue) (m) / Italy (Francesca Tognetti & Gloria Tocchi) (f)
  - Junior Mixed Team Relay winners: Italy (Gloria Tocchi & Alessandro Colasanti)
- September 1 – 7: 2014 World Modern Pentathlon Championships at (Poland) Warsaw
  - Individual winners: (Russia) Aleksander Lesun (m) / (United Kingdom) Samantha Murray (f)
  - Team Relay winners: France (Valentin Prades & Valentin Belaud) (m) / China (Chen Qian & LIANG Wanxia) (f)
  - Mixed Team Relay winners: Lithuania (Laura Asadauskaitė & Justinas Kinderis)
  - Men's Team winners: Hungary (Ádám Marosi, Róbert Kasza, & Bence Demeter)
  - Women's Team winners: China (WANG Wei, Chen Qian, and LIANG Wanxia)

== Continental modern pentathlon championships ==
- June 17 – 23: 2014 European Junior Modern Pentathlon Championships at Minsk
  - Junior Individual winners: (Ukraine) Vladislav Mishchenko (m) / (Italy) Gloria Tocchi (f)
  - Junior Team Relay winners: Russia (Dmitry Suslov & Viacheslav Bardyshev) (m) / Italy (Gloria Tocchi & Irene Prampolini) (f)
  - Junior Mixed Team Relay winners: Ukraine (Anastasiya Spas & Vladislav Mishchenko)
  - Junior Men's Team winners: Belarus (Ilya Palazkov, Dzianis Zeliankevich, & Kirill Kasyanik)
  - Junior Women's Team winners: France (Marie Oteiza, Julie Belhamri, & Adele Stern)
- July 7 – 12: 2014 European Modern Pentathlon Championships at Székesfehérvár
  - Individual winners: (Russia) Aleksander Lesun (m) / (Germany) Lena Schöneborn (f)
  - Team Relay winners: Russia (Ilia Frolov & Oleg Naumov) (m) / Ukraine (Victoria Tereshchuk & Anastasiya Spas) (f)
  - Mixed Team Relay winners: Lithuania (Justinas Kinderis & Laura Asadauskaitė)
  - Men's Team winners: Hungary (Peter Tibolya, Bence Demeter, & Róbert Kasza)
  - Women's Team winners: Germany (Janine Kohlmann, Lena Schöneborn, and Annika Schleu)
- July 17 – 20: 2014 PanAm and NORCECA Senior Championships at Mexico City
  - Individual winners: (Cuba) José Figueroa (m) / (Brazil) Yane Marques (f)
  - Team Relay winners: Cuba (José Figueroa & Yaniel Velazquez) (m) / United States (Samantha Achterberg & Isabella Isaksen) (f)
  - Mixed Team Relay winners: Canada (Melanie McCann & Joshua Riker-Fox)
  - Women's Team winners: Canada (Donna Vakalis, Melanie McCann, & Mathea Stevens)
  - Junior Individual winners: (Guatemala) Charles Fernandez (m) / (Mexico) Tamara Vega (f)
  - Youth Individual winners: (United States) Brendan Anderson (m) / (Guatemala) Isabel Brand (f)
- July 17 – 23: 2014 European Youth "A" Modern Pentathlon Championships at Uppsala
  - Youth Individual winners: (Russia) Alexander Lifanov (m) / (Italy) Irene Prampolini (f)
  - Youth Team Relay winners: Sweden (Daniel Steinbock & Hannes Stråle) (m) / Italy (Irene Prampolini & Silvia Salera) (f)
  - Youth Mixed Team Relay winners: Hungary (Sarolta Simon & Soma Tomaschof)
  - Youth Men's Team winners: Russia (Serge Baranov, Alexander Lifanov, & Danila Glavatskikh)
  - Youth Women's Team winners: Italy (Silvia Salera, Aurora Tognetti, & Irene Prampolini)
- July 30 – August 4: 2014 European Youth "B" Modern Pentathlon Championships in (Spain) Sant Boi de Llobregat
  - Youth Individual winners: (Italy) Matteo Cicinelli (m) / (Spain) Aroa Freije (f)
  - Youth Men's Team winners: Russia (Ivan Tarasov, Andrei Zuev, & Andrei Petrov)
  - Youth Women's Team winners: Russia (Ekaterina Utina, Xeina Fralcova, & Irina Sukhinskaia)

== 2014 Modern Pentathlon World Cup ==
- February 26 – March 3: MPWC #1 in (Mexico) Acapulco
  - Event cancelled, due to extreme heat.
- April 2 – 6: MPWC #2 in (Egypt) Cairo
  - Individual winners: (Italy) Riccardo De Luca (m) / (Lithuania) Laura Asadauskaitė (f)
  - Mixed Team Relay winners: Russia (Donata Rimšaitė and Dmitry Suslov)
  - Men's Team winners: France (Valentin Belaud, Christopher Patte, & Valentin Prades)
  - Women's Team winners: Lithuania (Laura Asadauskaitė, Lina Batuleviciute, & Karolina Guzauskaite)
  - Junior Individual winners: (Russia) Egor Puchkarevskiy (m) / (China) WANG Wei (f)
- April 16 – 21: MPWC #3 in (China) Chengdu
  - Individual winners: (Russia) Ilia Frolov (m) / (China) Chen Qian (f)
  - Mixed Team Relay winners: South Korea (Yang Soo-Jin & Hwang Woo-Jin)
  - Junior Individual winners: (South Korea) Jun Woong-tae (m) / (China) WANG Wei (f)
- April 30 – May 5: MPWC #4 in (Hungary) Kecskemét
  - Individual winners: (Hungary) Ádám Marosi (m) / (Poland) Oktawia Nowacka (f)
  - Mixed Team Relay winners: China (BIAN Yufei & CAI Zhaohong)
  - Junior Individual winners: (Czech Republic) Martin Bilko (m) / (Lithuania) Karolina Guzauskaite (f)
- June 5 – 9: MPWC #5 in (United States) Sarasota
  - Individual winners: (Russia) Aleksander Lesun (m) / (Poland) Oktawia Nowacka (f)
  - Mixed Team Relay winners: Russia (Aleksander Lesun & Ekaterina Khuraskina)
  - Junior Individual winners: (South Korea) Jun Woong-tae (m) / (Lithuania) Karolina Guzauskaite (f)
