= Modern pentathlon at the 2012 Summer Olympics – Qualification =

For each gender 36 athletes qualified for the Games, a maximum of two athletes per gender could qualify from any nation. Qualification methods were the same for both the men's and women's events.

Host nation Great Britain was awarded one qualifying place automatically and two invitational positions were allocated by the UPIM once the rest of the qualifiers were decided.

The first allocation of places to athletes based on competition results occurred between January and August 2011. One place was awarded to the winner of the 2011 World Cup Final. Nineteen places were determined by continental championships (Europe had 8 spots, Asia 5, the Americas 4, and Africa and Oceania each 1).

Three spots were available at each of the 2011 World Championships and World Championships.

The last seven places were awarded based on the 1 June 2012 world rankings.

== Men ==
While individual athletes qualify in qualifying events an NOC may only enter up to 2 athletes in each event. Should more than 2 athletes be eligible the non-selected quota was redistributed. The places in each event were allocated as follows:

| Event | Date | Location | Vacancies | Athletes qualified |
|---|---|---|---|---|
| 2011 UIPM World Cup Final | July 8–10, 2011 | (United Kingdom) London | 1 | Róbert Kasza (HUN) |
| 2011 Asian/Oceania Championships | May 19–22, 2011 | (China) Chengdu | 5 | ~~Hong Jin-Woo~~ (KOR); Cao Zhongrong (CHN); Jung Jin-hwa (KOR); Shinichi Tomii (JPN); Wang Guan (CHN) |
| 2011 Asian/Oceania Championships | May 19–22, 2011 | (China) Chengdu | 1 | Edward Fernon (AUS) |
| African Championship | July 22–24, 2011 | (Egypt) Cairo | 1 | Yasser Hefny (EGY) |
| European Championship | July 28- August 1, 2011 | (United Kingdom) Medway | 8 | Andrey Moiseev (RUS); ~~Serguei Karyakin~~ (RUS); Dmytro Kirpulyanskyy (UKR); ~~James Cook~~ (GBR); ~~Federico Giancamilli~~ (ITA); ~~Illia Frolov~~ (RUS); Steffen Gebhardt (GER); ~~Pierpaolo Petroni~~ (ITA) |
| 2011 World Modern Pentathlon Championships | September 8–14, 2011 | (Russia) Moscow | 2 | Ádám Marosi (HUN); Aleksander Lesun (RUS) |
| 2011 Pan American Games | October 15–16, 2011 | (Mexico) Guadalajara | 4 | Oscar Soto (MEX); Andrei Gheorghe (GUA); Esteban Bustos (CHI); Dennis Bowsher (USA) |
| 2012 World Modern Pentathlon Championships | May 7–13, 2012 | (Italy) Rome | 3 | Stefan Kollner (GER); Nicola Benedetti (ITA); Riccardo de Luca (ITA) |
| Pentathlon world ranking | June 1, 2012 | - | 11 | Nicholas Woodbridge (GBR); Hwang Woo-jin (KOR); Pavlo Tymoshchenko (UKR); ~~Bence Demeter~~ (HUN); Samuel Weale (GBR); Justinas Kinderis (LTU); Thomas Daniel (AUT); Pavel Iliashenko (KAZ); Stanislau Zhurauliou (BLR); David Svoboda (CZE); Christopher Patte (FRA) |
| Invitational places | - | - | 0 | - |
| Reallocation places | - | - | | Dzmitry Meliakh (BLR); Ondrej Polivka (CZE); Amro El Geziry (EGY); Rustem Sabizkhuzin (KAZ); Deniss Cerkovskis (LAT); ~~Łukasz Klekot~~ (POL); Szymon Staśkiewicz (POL); Arthur Lanigan O'Keeffe (IRL) |
| TOTAL | | | 36 | |

== Women ==
While individual athletes qualify in qualifying events an NOC may only enter up to 2 athletes in each event. Should more than 2 athletes be eligible the non-selected quota was redistributed. The places in each event were allocated as follows:

| Event | Date | Location | Vacancies | Athletes qualified |
|---|---|---|---|---|
| 2011 UIPM World Cup Final | July 8–10, 2011 | (United Kingdom) London | 1 | Lena Schoneborn (GER) |
| 2011 Asian/Oceania Championships | May 19–22, 2011 | (China) Chengdu | 5 | Chen Qian (CHN); Miao Yihua (CHN); ~~Wu Yanyan~~ (CHN); Yang Soo-jin (KOR); Shino Yamanaka (JPN) |
| 2011 Asian/Oceania Championships | May 19–22, 2011 | (China) Chengdu | 1 | Chloe Esposito (AUS) |
| African Championship | July 22–24, 2011 | (Egypt) Cairo | 1 | Aya Medany (EGY) |
| European Championship | July 28- August 1, 2011 | (United Kingdom) Medway | 8 | Adrienn Tóth (HUN); Victoria Tereshchuk (UKR); Amelie Caze (FRA); Laura Asadauskaitė (LTU); Elena Rublevska (LAT); Sarolta Kovács (HUN); ~~Freyja Prentice~~ (GBR); Ekaterina Khuraskina (RUS) |
| 2011 World Modern Pentathlon Championships | September 8–14, 2011 | (Russia) Moscow | 0 | - |
| 2011 Pan American Games | October 15–16, 2011 | (Mexico) Guadalajara | 4 | Margaux Isaksen (USA); Yane Marques (BRA); Tamara Vega (MEX); Melanie McCann (CAN) |
| 2012 World Modern Pentathlon Championships | May 7–13, 2012 | (Italy) Rome | 3 | Mhairi Spence (GBR); Samantha Murray (GBR); Anastasia Prokopenko (BLR) |
| Pentathlon world ranking | June 1, 2012 | - | 13 | Elodie Clouvel (FRA); ~~Heather Fell~~ (GBR); Annika Schleu (GER); ~~Eva Trautmann~~ (GER); Sylwia Gawlikowska (POL); ~~Leila Gyenesei~~ (HUN); Evdokia Gretchichnikova (RUS); Natalie Dianova (CZE); ~~Yuliya Kolegova~~ (RUS); Sabrina Crognale (ITA); ~~Janine Kohlmann~~ (GER); ~~Donata Rimsaite~~ (RUS); ~~Katy Burke~~ (GBR) |
| Invitational places | - | - | 0 | - |
| Reallocation places | - | - | | Hanna Vasilionak (BLR); Donna Vakalis (CAN); Natalya Coyle (IRL); Claudia Cesarini (ITA); Narumi Kurosu (JPN); Gintarė Venčkauskaitė (LTU); Katarzyna Wojcik (POL); Iryna Khokhlova (UKR); Suzanne Stettinius (USA) |
| TOTAL | | | 36 | |
