= Modern Pentathlon World Cup =

Sports competition

Modern Pentathlon World Cup is an annual series of modern pentathlon competitions organised by the International Modern Pentathlon Union (UIPM). Competitions are held in a number of countries and each series culminates in a World Cup Final. It is the top level annual series for the sport.

The 2010 edition had its world cup final in Moscow and the 2014 series has its final in Sarasota Bradenton.

== Winners of the World Cup Final ==
Year	Women	Men	Team-Relay Women	Team-Relay Men	Team-Relay Mix
1999	(Poland) Dorota Idzi	(France) Sébastien Deleigne	(United Kingdom) Kate Allenby (United Kingdom) Georgina Harland (United Kingdom) Steph Cook	(Hungary) Ákos Hanzély (Hungary) Péter Sárfalvi (Hungary) Gábor Balogh	
2000	(France) Caroline Delemer	(Ukraine) Vadym Tkachuk			
2001		(Lithuania) Edvinas Krungolcas			
2002	(Italy) Claudia Corsini	(Lithuania) Andrejus Zadneprovskis			
2003	(United Kingdom) Georgia Harland	(Kazakhstan) Rustem Sabirkhuzin			
2004	(United Kingdom) Kate Allenby	(Lithuania) Edvinas Krungolcas			
2005	(Italy) Claudia Corsini	(Lithuania) Edvinas Krungolcas			
2006	(Italy) Alessia Pieretti	(Czech Republic) Libor Capalini			
2007	(Egypt) Aya Medany	(Lithuania) Edvinas Krungolcas			
2008	(Lithuania) Donata Rimšaitė	(Hungary) Róbert Kasza			
2009	(Lithuania) Donata Rimšaitė	(Hungary) Ádám Marosi			
2010	(Germany) Lena Schöneborn	(Hungary) Ádám Marosi			
2011	(Germany) Lena Schöneborn	(Hungary) Róbert Kasza			
2012	(Lithuania) Laura Asadauskaitė	(Russia) Ilia Frolov			
2013	(Ukraine) Victoria Tereshchuk	(France) Valentin Prades			(Latvia) Jeļena Rubļevska (Latvia) Deniss Cernovskis
2014	(Poland) Oktawia Nowacka	(Russia) Aleksander Lesun			(Russia) Ekaterina Khuraskina (Russia) Aleksander Lesun
2015	(Lithuania) Laura Asadauskaitė	(Italy) Riccardo De Luca			(Belarus) Katsiaryna Arol (Belarus) Ilya Palazkov
2016	(Germany) Lena Schöneborn	(United Kingdom) James Cooke			(Republic of Ireland) Natalya Coyle (Republic of Ireland) Arthur Lanigan-O'Keeffe
2017	(Hungary) Tamara Alekszejev	(France) Valentin Prades			(Republic of Ireland) Natalya Coyle (Republic of Ireland) Arthur Lanigan-O'Keeffe
2018	(Australia) Chloe Esposito	(South Korea) Jung Jin-hwa			(Italy) Alice Sotero (Italy) Riccardo De Luca
2019	(Lithuania) Laura Asadauskaitė	(United Kingdom) Joe Choong			(France) Élodie Clouvel (France) Valentin Prades

== Host venues ==
Year	Stage 1	Stage 2	Stage 3	Stage 4	Stage 5	Stage 6	Final
1999	(United States) San Antonio	Mexico City	(Italy) Rome	(Germany) Darmstadt	(France) Aix-en-Provence/ (Hungary) Budapest	—	(Australia) Sydney
2000	(United States) San Antonio		(South Korea) Seoul	(Hungary) Budapest	(Germany) Darmstadt	—	(France) Aix-en-Provence
2001	Mexico City	(Germany) Warendorf	(Hungary) Székesfehérvár	(Hungary) Budapest	(United Kingdom) Bath	—	(Russia) Moscow
2002	Mexico City	(Spain) Madrid	(Hungary) Székesfehérvár/ (Germany) Sindelfingen	(Hungary) Budapest/ (Poland) Warsaw		—	(Hungary) Budapest
2003	Mexico City	(Hungary) Székesfehérvár	(Poland) Warsaw			—	(Greece) Athens
2004	(Mexico) Queretaro	(Brazil) Rio de Janeiro	(China) Beijing	(Hungary) Budapest		—	(Germany) Darmstadt
2005	(Mexico) Acapulco	(Hungary) Székesfehérvár/ (Germany) Leipzig	(Hungary) Budapest/ (France) Paris	(Greece) Athens		—	(Sweden) Uppsala
2006	(Mexico) Acapulco	(United Kingdom) Millfield	(Germany) Berlin/ (Russia) Moscow	(Hungary) Budapest/ (Hungary) Székesfehérvár	(Egypt) Cairo	(Italy) Chianciano Terme	(Italy) Chianciano Terme
2007	Mexico City	(Egypt) Cairo	(United Kingdom) Millfield	(Russia) Moscow/ (Hungary) Budapest	(Hungary) Székesfehérvár/ (Poland) Drzonków	(Italy) Rome	(China) Beijing
2008	(Egypt) Cairo	Mexico City	(United Kingdom) Millfield	(Spain) Madrid	(Czech Republic) Kladno	—	(Portugal) Caldas da Rainha
2009	Mexico City	(Egypt) Cairo	(Hungary) Budapest	(Hungary) Székesfehérvár	(Italy) Rome	—	(Brazil) Rio de Janeiro
2010	(Mexico) Playa del Carmen	(Egypt) Cairo	(United Kingdom) Medway	(Hungary) Budapest	(Germany) Berlin	—	(Russia) Moscow
2011	(United States) Palm Springs	(Italy) Sassari	(Hungary) Budapest	(China) Chengdu	—	—	(United Kingdom) London
2012	(United States) Charlotte	(Brazil) Rio de Janeiro	(Hungary) Százhalombatta	(Russia) Rostov-on-Don	—	—	(China) Chengdu
2013	(United States) Palm Springs	(Brazil) Rio de Janeiro	(China) Chengdu	(Hungary) Budapest	—	—	(Russia) Nizhniy Novgorod
2014		(Egypt) Cairo	(China) Chengdu	(Hungary) Kecskemét	—	—	(United States) Sarasota
2015	(United States) Sarasota	(Egypt) Cairo	(Italy) Rome	(Hungary) Kecskemét	—	—	(Belarus) Minsk
2016	(Egypt) Cairo	(Brazil) Rio de Janeiro	(Italy) Rome	(Hungary) Kecskemét	—	—	(United States) Sarasota
2017	(United States) Los Angeles	(Egypt) Cairo	(Hungary) Kecskemét	(Poland) Drzonkow	—	—	(Lithuania) Vilnius
2018	(Egypt) Cairo	(United States) Los Angeles	(Hungary) Kecskemét	(Bulgaria) Sofia	—	—	(Kazakhstan) Astana
2019	(Egypt) Cairo	(Bulgaria) Sofia	(Hungary) Kecskemét	(Czech Republic) Prague	—	—	(Japan) Tokyo
2020	(Egypt) Cairo	(United States) Sofia	(Czech Republic) Prague	(Hungary) Budapest	—	—	(South Korea) Seoul
2021	(Hungary) Budapest	(Bulgaria) Sofia	(Bulgaria) Sofia	—	—	—	(Hungary) Székesfehérvár
2022	(Egypt) Cairo	(Hungary) Budapest	(Bulgaria) Albena	(Turkey) Ankara	—	—	(Turkey) Ankara
2023	(Egypt) Cairo	(Turkey) Ankara	(Hungary) Budapest	(Bulgaria) Sofia	—	—	(Turkey) Ankara
2024	(Egypt) Cairo	(Turkey) Ankara	(Hungary) Budapest	(Bulgaria) Sofia	—	—	(Turkey) Ankara
2025	(Egypt) Cairo	(Hungary) Budapest	(Bulgaria) Pazardzhik	—	—	—	(Egypt) Alexandria
