= 2015 European Modern Pentathlon Championships =

- Venue: University of Bath
- Location: Bath, United Kingdom
- Dates: 17–23 August

The 2015 European Modern Pentathlon Championships was held in Bath, Great Britain from 17 to 23 August 2015.

The event was a direct qualification event for the 2016 Summer Olympics, with the eight highest finishers in the men's and women's individual events gaining quota places for their National Olympic Committee at the 2016 Games.

== Medal summary ==
=== Men's events ===
Event	Gold	Silver	Bronze
Individual	(Republic of Ireland) Arthur Lanigan-O'Keeffe	(France) Valentin Prades	(Italy) Riccardo De Luca
Team	France; Valentin Belaud; Christopher Patte; Valentin Prades	Russia; Ilia Frolov; Aleksander Lesun; Egor Puchkarevskiy	Czech Republic; Jan Kuf; Ondřej Polívka; David Svoboda
Relay	Ukraine; Andriy Fedechko; Dmytro Kirpulyanskyy	Hungary; Bence Harangozó; István Málits	Italy; Tullio De Santis; Valerio Grasselli

=== Women's events ===
Event	Gold	Silver	Bronze
Individual	(Lithuania) Laura Asadauskaitė	(France) Élodie Clouvel	(Germany) Lena Schöneborn
Team	Great Britain; Freyja Atkinson; Kate French; Samantha Murray	Germany; Janine Kohlmann; Annika Schleu; Lena Schöneborn	Italy; Claudia Cesarini; Alice Sotero; Gloria Tocchi
Relay	Germany; Annika Schleu; Lena Schöneborn	Russia; Svetlana Lebedeva; Ekaterina Khuraskina	Lithuania; Lina Batulevičiūtė; Emilija Serapinaitė

=== Mixed events ===
Event	Gold	Silver	Bronze
Relay	Italy; Camilla Lontano; Valerio Grasselli	Belarus; Katsiaryna Arol; Ilya Palazkov	Russia; Donata Rimshayte; Aleksandr Kukarin

=== Medal table ===
* Host nation (Great Britain)

Rank	Nation	Gold	Silver	Bronze	Total
1	France	1	2	0	3
2	Germany	1	1	1	3
3	Italy	1	0	3	4
4	Lithuania	1	0	1	2
5	Great Britain*	1	0	0	1
5	Ireland	1	0	0	1
5	Ukraine	1	0	0	1
8	Russia	0	2	1	3
9	Belarus	0	1	0	1
9	Hungary	0	1	0	1
11	Czech Republic	0	0	1	1
Totals (11 entries)		7	7	7	21
