= 2014 European Modern Pentathlon Championships =

The 2014 European Modern Pentathlon Championships were held in Székesfehérvár, Hungary from July 10 to 15, 2014.

== Medal summary ==
=== Men's events ===
Event	Gold	Silver	Bronze
Individual	(Russia) Aleksander Lesun	(Russia) Ilia Frolov	(Ukraine) Pavlo Tymoshchenko
Team	Hungary; Bence Demeter; Róbert Kasza; Péter Tibolya	Italy; Nicola Benedetti; Riccardo De Luca; Pier Paolo Petroni	Czech Republic; Martin Bilko; Jan Kuf; Ondřej Polívka
Relay	Russia; Ilia Frolov; Oleg Naumov	France; Valentin Belaud; Valentin Prades	Great Britain; Samuel Curry; Thomas Toolis

=== Women's events ===
Event	Gold	Silver	Bronze
Individual	(Germany) Lena Schöneborn	(Ukraine) Victoria Tereshchuk	(Russia) Donata Rimsaite
Team	Germany; Janine Kohlmann; Annika Schleu; Lena Schöneborn	Ukraine; Iryna Khokhlova; Anastasiya Spas; Victoria Tereshchuk	Italy; Claudia Cesarini; Alice Sotero; Gloria Tocchi
Relay	Ukraine; Anastasiya Spas; Victoria Tereshchuk	Germany; Annika Schleu; Lena Schöneborn	Russia; Anna Savchenko; Anna Buriak

=== Mixed events ===
Event	Gold	Silver	Bronze
Relay	Lithuania; Laura Asadauskaitė; Justinas Kinderis	Great Britain; Samantha Murray; Joseph Evans	Poland; Oktawia Nowacka; Łukasz Klekot

=== Medal table ===
* Host nation (Hungary)

Rank	Nation	Gold	Silver	Bronze	Total
1	Russia	2	1	2	5
2	Germany	2	1	0	3
3	Ukraine	1	2	1	4
4	Hungary*	1	0	0	1
4	Lithuania	1	0	0	1
6	Great Britain	0	1	1	2
6	Italy	0	1	1	2
8	France	0	1	0	1
9	Czech Republic	0	0	1	1
9	Poland	0	0	1	1
Totals (10 entries)		7	7	7	21
