= Modern pentathlon at the 2016 Summer Olympics – Men's =

Men's modern pentathlon at the Games of the XXXI Olympiad
- Venues: Deodoro Aquatics Centre (swimming); Deodoro Stadium (riding and combined); Youth Arena (fencing)
- Dates: 18–20 August 2016
- Competitors: 36 from 25 nations
- Winning total: 1479 points OR

Medalists
1st place, gold medalist(s)		Aleksander Lesun	Russia
2nd place, silver medalist(s)		Pavlo Tymoshchenko	Ukraine
3rd place, bronze medalist(s)		Ismael Hernández	Mexico

The men's modern pentathlon at the 2016 Summer Olympics in Rio de Janeiro was held on 19 August. Three venues were used: Deodoro Aquatics Centre (swimming), Deodoro Stadium (horse-riding and combined running and shooting) and Youth Arena (fencing).

The medals were presented by Timothy Fok, IOC member, Hong Kong and Klaus Schormann, President of the UIPM.

== Competition format ==
The modern pentathlon consisted of five events, all held on the same day. The format was slightly different from the typical modern pentathlon, with two events combined at the end.

- Fencing: A round-robin, one-touch épée competition. Score was based on winning percentage.
- Swimming: A 200 m freestyle race. Score was based on time.
- Riding: A show jumping competition. Score based on penalties for fallen bars, refusals, falls, and being over the time limit.
- Combined running/shooting: A 3 km run with pistol shooting (the athlete must hit five targets in 70 seconds) every kilometre. Starts were staggered based on points from the previous three events.

== Schedule ==
All times are UTC-3

Date	Time	Round
Thursday, 18 August 2016	14:30	Fencing (Ranking Round)
Saturday, 20 August 2016	12:00	Swimming
Saturday, 20 August 2016	14:00	Fencing (Bonus Round)
Saturday, 20 August 2016	15:30	Riding
Saturday, 20 August 2016	18:00	Combined running/shooting

== Results ==
Thirty-six athletes participated.

Key

♦ The highest mark recorded in each event is highlighted in yellow with a diamond symbol.

Rank	Athlete	Country	Swimming Time (pts)	Fencing Victories (pts)	Riding Time (pts)	Combined Time (pts)	Total
1st place, gold medalist(s)	Aleksander Lesun	Russia	2:05.58 (324)	28 (268)^{♦} OR	71.02 (279)	11:32.35 (608)	1479 OR
2nd place, silver medalist(s)	Pavlo Tymoshchenko	Ukraine	2:05.59 (324)	21 (227)	65.43 (286)	11:05.74 (635)	1472
3rd place, bronze medalist(s)	Ismael Hernández	Mexico	2:02.12 (334)	18 (208)	71.78 (300)	11:14.33 (626)	1468
4	Valentin Prades	France	2:04.44 (327)	21 (227)	77.92 (277)	11:04.08 (636)	1467
5	Riccardo De Luca	Italy	2:09.36 (312)	20 (222)	71.56 (300)	11:07.23 (633)	1467
6	Patrick Dogue	Germany	2:07.65 (318)	25 (240)	80.73 (288)	11:23.36 (617)	1463
7	Max Esposito	Australia	1:59.71 (341)	14 (185)	74.39 (300)	11:04.99 (636)	1462
8	Arthur Lanigan-O'Keeffe	Ireland	2:03.03 (331)	16 (198)	74.83 (300)	11:12.21 (628)	1457
9	David Svoboda	Czech Republic	2:05.59 (324)	21 (226)	79.48 (282)	11:20.92 (620)	1452
10	Joseph Choong	Great Britain	1:58.50 (345)	22 (224)	70.31 (293)	11:51.59 (589)	1451
11	Nathan Schrimsher	United States	2:00.87 (338)	20 (220)	79.42 (282)	11:30.76 (610)	1450
12	Ádám Marosi	Hungary	2:01.66 (335)	16 (196)	67.87 (293)	11:19.84 (621)	1445
13	Jung Jin-hwa	South Korea	2:00.82 (338)	17 (203)	78.75 (283)	11:21.80 (619)	1443
14	James Cooke	Great Britain	1:55.60 (354)^{♦} OR	14 (185)	80.48 (288)	11:31.07 (609)	1436
15	Charles Fernandez	Guatemala	2:03.18 (331)	16 (214)	80.58 (271)	11:21.49 (619)	1435
16	Cao Zhongrong	China	2:00.08 (340)	17 (204)	74.31 (300)	11:51.14 (589)	1433
17	Bence Demeter	Hungary	2:03.89 (329)	19 (217)	74.62 (265)	11:21.98 (619)	1430
18	Guo Jianli	China	2:01.94 (335)	19 (214)	73.06 (286)	11:46.21 (594)	1429
19	Jun Woong-tae	South Korea	2:00.88 (338)	13 (178)	73.91 (272)	11:02.50 (638) ^{♦} OR	1426
20	Valentin Belaud	France	2:07.83 (317)	19 (216)	74.31 (286)	11:39.37 (601)	1420
21	Christian Zillekens	Germany	2:06.24 (322)	16 (196)	75.90 (286)	11:27.45 (613)	1417
22	Tomoya Miguchi	Japan	2:02.62 (333)	20 (220)	80.30 (281)	12:02.88 (578)	1412
23	Omar El Geziry	Egypt	2:03.62 (330)	23 (239)	75.10 (265)	12:11.94 (569)	1403
24	Pier Paolo Petroni	Italy	2:05.51 (324)	13 (179)	75.94 (293)	11:39.60 (601)	1397
25	Amro El Geziry	Egypt	1:55.80 (353)	18 (208)	77.23 (291)	12:39.19 (541)	1393
26	Andriy Fedechko	Ukraine	2:05.63 (324)	16 (198)	79.49 (275)	11:47.68 (593)	1390
27	Szymon Staśkiewicz	Poland	2:10.16 (310)	21 (227)	73.44 (258)	11:45.88 (595)	1390
28	Ruslans Nakonechnyi	Latvia	2:03.83 (329)	13 (180)	72.45 (272)	11:35.70 (605)	1386
29	Shohei Iwamoto	Japan	2:08.65 (315)	09 (154)	74.90 (300) ^{♦}	11:54.59 (586)	1355
30	Emmanuel Zapata	Argentina	2:06.66 (320)	11 (166)	77.50 (277)	12:03.19 (577)	1340
31	Felipe Nascimento	Brazil	2:05.39 (324)	09 (155)	75.72 (251)	12:15.59 (565)	1295
32	Jose Ricardo Figueroa	Cuba	2:15.39 (294)	09 (156)	122.31 (233)	12:49.13 (531)	1214
33	Dimitar Krastanov	Bulgaria	2:04.96 (326)	19 (215)	E (0)	11:02.95 (638)	1179
34	Justinas Kinderis	Lithuania	2:06.84 (320)	18 (211)	E (0)	11:27.33 (613)	1144
35	Pavel Ilyashenko	Kazakhstan	2:06.19 (322)	18 (208)	E (0)	11:29.79 (611)	1141
36	Jan Kuf	Czech Republic	2:05.84 (323)	19 (215)	E (0)	12:15.62 (565)	1103

== Records ==
Broken Olympic records during the 2016 Summer Olympics
Total	Aleksander Lesun (RUS)	1479 pts.
Swimming	James Cooke (GBR)	1:55.60
Combined	Jun Woong-tae (KOR)	11:02.50
Running	Dimitar Krastanov (BUL)	10:20.18
Shooting - 1 session of 5 shots	Jun Woong-tae (KOR)	7.39
Shooting - 4 session of 20 shots	Nathan Schrimsher (USA)	34.08
