= Modern pentathlon at the 2014 Central American and Caribbean Games =

- Venue: Heriberto Jara Corona Stadium and Universidad Veracruzana
- Location: Veracruz, Mexico
- Dates: 15-18 November

The Modern pentathlon competition at the 2014 Central American and Caribbean Games was held in Veracruz, Mexico.

The tournament was scheduled to be held from 15–18 November at the Heriberto Jara Corona Stadium and Universidad Veracruzana.

== Medal summary ==
=== Men's events ===
Event	Gold	Silver	Bronze
Individual	Ismael Hernandez (MEX)	Jose Figueroa (CUB)	Yaniel Velazquez (CUB)
Relay	Mexico (MEX); Ismael Hernandez; Saul Rivera	Cuba (CUB); Jose Figueroa; Yaniel Velazquez	Venezuela (VEN); Julio Luna; Eduardo Salas

=== Women's events ===
Event	Gold	Silver	Bronze
Individual	Leydi Moya (CUB)	Tamara Vega (MEX)	Thelma Marinez (MEX)
Relay	Guatemala (GUA); Maria Ximena Dieguez; Sophia Hernandez	Mexico (MEX); Tamara Vega; Elena Nogueda	Cuba (CUB); Leydi Moya; Eliani Camara

=== Mixed events ===
Event	Gold	Silver	Bronze
Relay	Cuba (CUB); Jose Figueroa; Leydi Moya	Guatemala (GUA); Charles Fernandez; Isabel Brand	Mexico (MEX); Manuel Padilla; Thelma Martinez

== Medal table ==
* Host nation (Mexico)

Rank	Nation	Gold	Silver	Bronze	Total
1	Cuba (CUB)	2	2	2	6
1	Mexico (MEX)*	2	2	2	6
3	Guatemala (GUA)	1	1	0	2
4	Venezuela (VEN)	0	0	1	1
Totals (4 entries)		5	5	5	15
