= 2013 European Modern Pentathlon Championships =

The 2013 European Modern Pentathlon Championships were held in Drzonków, Poland from July 11 to 17, 2013.

== Medal summary ==
=== Men's events ===
Event	Gold	Silver	Bronze
Individual	Ádám Marosi (HUN)	Róbert Kasza (HUN)	Aleksander Lesun (RUS)
Team	Hungary; Bence Demeter; Róbert Kasza; Ádám Marosi	France; Jean Maxence Berrou; Christopher Patte; Valentin Prades	Italy; Nicola Benedetti; Riccardo De Luca; Pier Paolo Petroni
Relay	France; Valentin Belaud; Geoffrey Megi; Valentin Prades	Czech Republic; Jan Kuf; Ondřej Polívka; Michal Sedlecký	Great Britain; James Cooke; Samuel Curry; Joseph Evans

=== Women's events ===
Event	Gold	Silver	Bronze
Individual	Zsófia Földházi (HUN)	Ganna Buriak (UKR)	Anastasiya Spas (UKR)
Team	Great Britain; Kate French; Samantha Murray; Mhairi Spence	Ukraine; Ganna Buriak; Iryna Khokhlova; Victoria Tereshchuk	Germany; Ronja Doring; Annika Schleu; Lena Schöneborn
Relay	Great Britain; Katy Burke; Kate French; Samantha Murray	Poland; Oktawia Nowacka; Aleksandra Skarzyńska; Katarzyna Wójcik	Germany; Claudia Knack; Annika Schleu; Lena Schöneborn

=== Mixed events ===
Event	Gold	Silver	Bronze
Relay	Ukraine; Victoria Tereshchuk; Pavlo Tymoshchenko	Russia; Donata Rimsaite; Aleksander Lesun	Lithuania; Laura Asadauskaitė; Justinas Kinderis

=== Medal table ===
* Host nation (Poland)

Rank	Nation	Gold	Silver	Bronze	Total
1	Hungary	3	1	0	4
2	Great Britain	2	0	1	3
3	Ukraine	1	2	1	4
4	France	1	1	0	2
5	Russia	0	1	1	2
6	Czech Republic	0	1	0	1
6	Poland*	0	1	0	1
8	Germany	0	0	2	2
9	Italy	0	0	1	1
9	Lithuania	0	0	1	1
Totals (10 entries)		7	7	7	21
