= Annika Schleu =

German modern pentathlete (born 1990)

Annika Zillekens
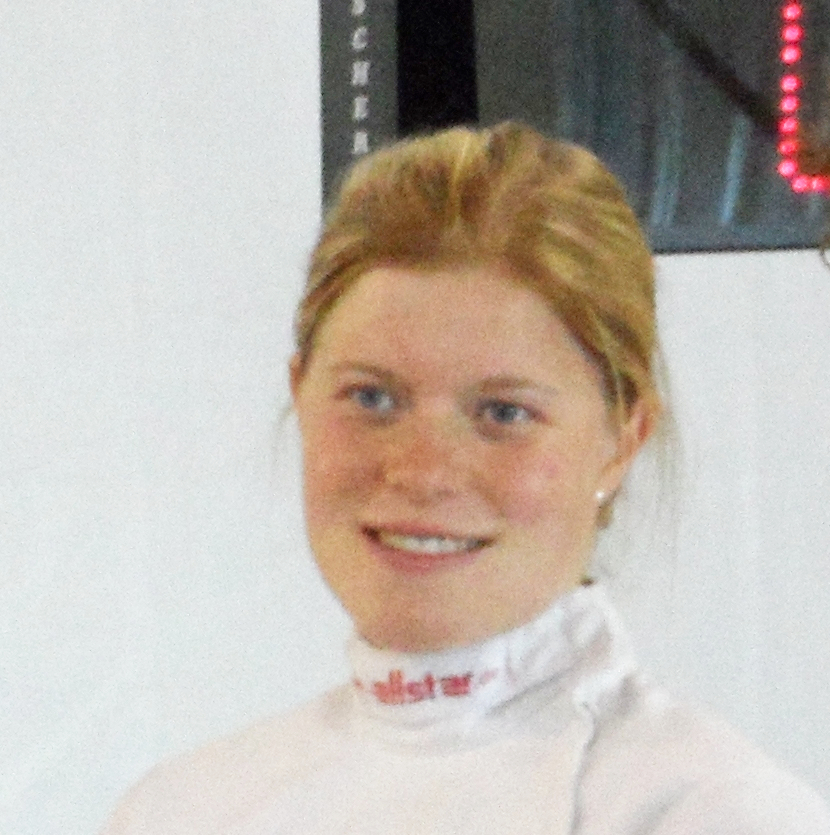
- Annika Schleu in 2012

Personal information
- Nationality: German
- Born: Annika Schleu; 3 April 1990 (age 36) Berlin, Germany
- Height: 1.75 m (5 ft 9 in)
- Weight: 63 kg (139 lb)

Sport
- Country: Germany
- Sport: Modern Pentathlon
Medal record
Women's modern pentathlon
Representing Germany
World Championships
Gold medal – first place	2011 Moscow	Team
Gold medal – first place	2012 Rome	Relay
Gold medal – first place	2016 Moscow	Relay
Gold medal – first place	2017 Cairo	Relay
Gold medal – first place	2021 Cairo	Team
Silver medal – second place	2011 Moscow	Relay
Silver medal – second place	2015 Berlin	Team
Silver medal – second place	2018 Mexico City	Individual
Silver medal – second place	2018 Mexico City	Relay
Bronze medal – third place	2010 Chengdu	Team
Bronze medal – third place	2016 Moscow	Team
Bronze medal – third place	2017 Cairo	Team
Bronze medal – third place	2018 Mexico City	Team
Bronze medal – third place	2019 Budapest	Team
European Games
Gold medal – first place	2023 Kraków-Małopolska	Team
European Championships
Gold medal – first place	2010 Debrecen	Team
Gold medal – first place	2014 Székesfehérvár	Team
Gold medal – first place	2015 Bath	Relay
Gold medal – first place	2017 Minsk	Relay
Gold medal – first place	2023 Kraków	Team
Silver medal – second place	2010 Debrecen	Relay
Silver medal – second place	2011 Medway	Team
Silver medal – second place	2011 Medway	Relay
Silver medal – second place	2014 Székesfehérvár	Relay
Silver medal – second place	2015 Bath	Team
Silver medal – second place	2024 Budapest	Relay
Bronze medal – third place	2013 Drzonków	Team
Bronze medal – third place	2013 Drzonków	Relay

Annika Zillekens (née Schleu; born 3 April 1990) is a German modern pentathlete. She won the gold medal of the relay event at the 2012 World Championships and 2017 World Championships. She has competed in four Olympic Games, finishing in 26th place in 2012 and in 4th place in 2016. In 2021, at the delayed 2020 Summer Olympics in Tokyo, Zillekens, under her maiden name Annika Schleu, received widespread attention after her treatment of the horse she was assigned for the riding portion of the event went viral. Her reaction, and the resulting controversy of the event, partially contributed to modern pentathlon removing equestrian jumping from their competition.

== Personal life ==
She was born in Berlin, Germany. She is married to fellow modern pentathlete Christian Zillekens.

== Individual events ==
She won the silver medal at the 2018 World Championships. At junior level, she also won silver at the 2008 European Junior Championships.

=== 2020 Tokyo Olympics ===
Schleu was leading the competition at the 2020 Tokyo Olympics when she was unable to successfully complete the show jumping event, moving her from first to last place, and an eventual 31st place. Her trainer Kim Raisner was sent home from the Olympics after footage showed her seemingly punch Schleu's assigned horse for not performing in a desired manner. The horse named Saint Boy was randomly assigned from a pool of 18 and had also with Russian Olympic Committee athlete Gulnaz Gubaydullina (32nd overall) refused to jump three barriers in the second half of the equestrian course. Schleu also faced backlash against her repeated use of the whip and rough handling of her horse. The incident prompted German Olympic team member and equestrian medal record holder Isabell Werth to criticize modern pentathlon's use of horses; she stated that "Pentathlon has nothing to do with equestrian sport" and treats horses as "a means of transport to which the athletes have no connection." Werth also expressed sympathy for Schleu, whom she saw as a victim of the system of the sport.

On 13 January 2022, her legal team announced that an earlier lawsuit had been dropped; both Schleu and Raisner had faced legal action, with the German Animal Welfare Association filing a criminal complaint against the pair on 13 August 2021. Schleu agreed to donate €500 to charity; defense attorneys said this did not constitute an admission of guilt.

In response to this issue, modern pentathlon's governing body voted to remove horse riding from its programme at the Olympics after the Paris 2024 Games.

=== Return to competition ===
In 2023, Schleu returned to competition under her married name. In July 2024, Schleu, under the name Annika Zillekens was nominated by Germany to compete at the 2024 Summer Olympic Games. Modern pentathlon at the 2024 Summer Olympics in Paris will be the last time the sport will include show jumping at an international games. Prior to Paris, Zillekens indicated that the 2024 Olympics will be her final competition.

== Team events ==
With Lena Schöneborn, Schleu won the women's relay gold medal at the 2016 and 2017 World Championships. Schleu had previously been in the 2012 women's relay gold medal-winning team with Schöneborn and Janine Kohlmann. She had already won silver in 2011 with Schöneborn and Eva Trautmann, at both the European Championships and the World Championships.

She was also part of the German women's relay team that won the silver medal at the 2014 and 2017 European Championship, alongside Lena Schöneborn. She again won silver at the 2018 World Championships, this time with Ronja Steinborn. At the 2013 European Championships, she won the bronze medal teaming with Schöneborn and Claudia Knack.

At the junior level, she was part of the German team which won the mixed relay gold at the 2011 Junior World Championships.
