= Alexander Kukarin =

Russian modern pentathlete

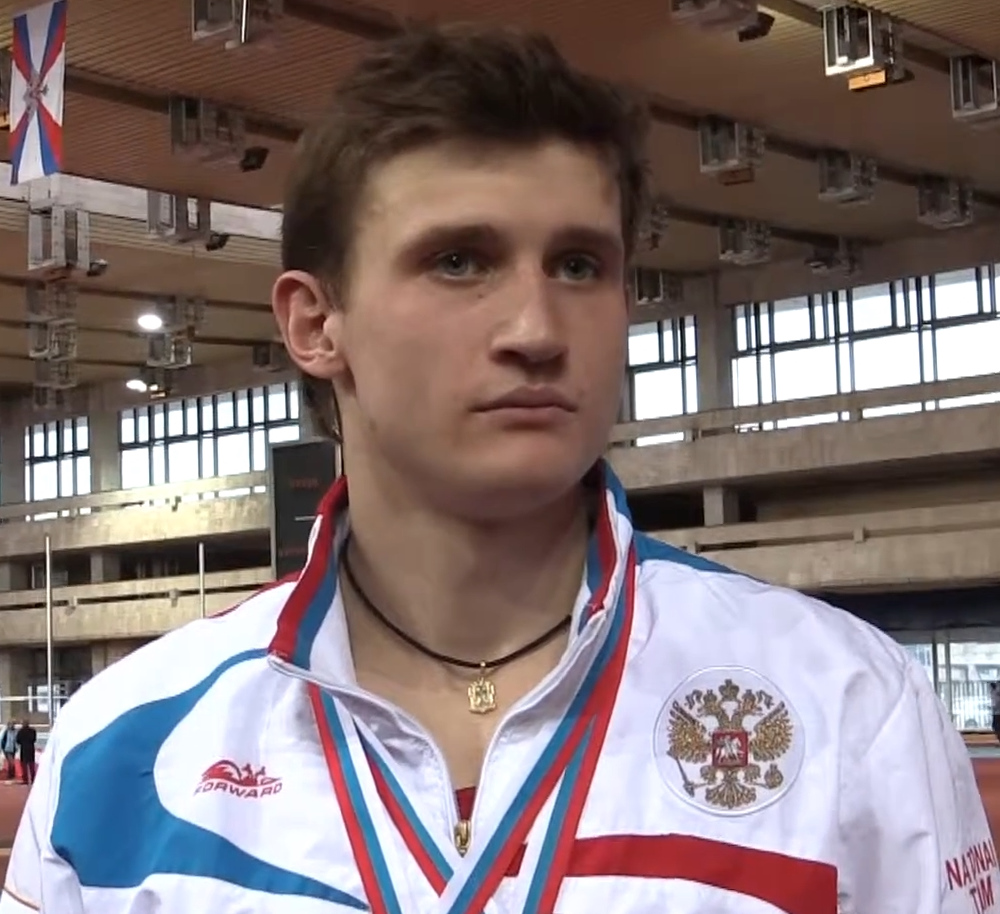
- Kukarin in January 2015

Personal information
- Nationality: Russia
- Born: 13 August 1993 Moscow, Russia
- Died: 27 November 2015 (aged 22) Moscow, Russia

Sport
- Sport: Modern pentathlon
- Team: Russian national team
Medal record
Men's modern pentathlon
Representing Russia
World Championships
Silver medal – second place	2015 Berlin	Relay
European Championships
Bronze medal – third place	2015 Bath	Mixed elay

Alexander Kukarin (13 August 1993 – 27 November 2015) was a Russian modern pentathlete. He was considered an up-and-coming athlete who had begun to represent the Russian national team in 2015. He won the silver medal at the 2015 World Modern Pentathlon Championships in the men's relay together with Kirill Belyakov in June 2015 and the bronze medal at the 2015 European championship in the mixed relay and he won the 2015 Cup of Russia. In the cadet category in 2011 he became double world champion at the UIPM Youth A world championships in his own headship and in the men's relay.

On 27 November 2015, when he was 22 years old, he was found dead in a hotel room in Moscow after a suspected heart attack. An investigation is under way but there are no signs of foul play.

== Palmares ==
=== Cadet ===
- (gold) 2011 UIPM youth A world championships (headship)
- (gold) 2011 UIPM youth A world championships (relay)

=== Senior ===
- (silver) 2015 World Modern Pentathlon Championships (relay, with Kirill Belyakov)
- (bronze) 2015 European Modern Pentathlon Championships (mixed relay)
- 1st Cup of Russia
