= 2016 European Modern Pentathlon Championships =

The 2016 European Modern Pentathlon Championships were held in Sofia, Bulgaria from 4–11 July 2016.

== Medal summary ==
=== Men's events ===
Event	Gold	Silver	Bronze
Individual	Jan Kuf (CZE)	Róbert Kasza (HUN)	Riccardo De Luca (ITA)
Team	Italy; Riccardo De Luca; Pier Paolo Petroni; Fabio Poddighe	France; Valentin Belaud; Simon Casse; Gauthier Romani	Germany; Stefan Köllner; Fabian Liebig; Alexander Nobis
Relay	Russia; Alexander Savkin; Aleksander Lesun	Czech Republic; Ondřej Polívka; Martin Bilko	Poland; Sebastian Stasiak; Jarosław Świderski

=== Women's events ===
Event	Gold	Silver	Bronze
Individual	Laura Asadauskaitė (LTU)	Gulnaz Gubaydullina (RUS)	İlke Özyüksel (TUR)
Team	Lithuania; Gintarė Venčkauskaitė; Laura Asadauskaitė; Karolina Gužauskaitė	Great Britain; Samantha Murray; Joanna Muir; Kate French	Russia; Anna Buriak; Gulnaz Gubaydullina; Anastasia Petrova
Relay	Belarus; Katsiaryna Arol; Iryna Prasiantsova	Germany; Ronja Doring; Janine Kohlmann	Hungary; Tamara Alekszejev; Alexandra Boros

=== Mixed events ===
Event	Gold	Silver	Bronze
Relay	Czech Republic; Natalie Dianová; Jan Kuf	Russia; Donata Rimshayte; Alexander Savkin	Italy; Lavinia Bonessio; Auro Franceschini

=== Medal table ===
Rank	Nation	Gold	Silver	Bronze	Total
1	Czech Republic	2	1	0	3
2	Lithuania	2	0	0	2
3	Russia	1	2	1	4
4	Italy	1	0	2	3
5	Belarus	1	0	0	1
6	Germany	0	1	1	2
6	Hungary	0	1	1	2
8	France	0	1	0	1
8	Great Britain	0	1	0	1
10	Poland	0	0	1	1
10	Turkey	0	0	1	1
Totals (11 entries)		7	7	7	21
