= Narumi Kurosu =

Japanese modern pentathlete

Personal information
- Born: 22 October 1991 (age 35) Shimotsuma, Ibaraki, Japan
- Height: 159 cm (5 ft 3 in)
- Weight: 52 kg (115 lb)
- Website: ameblo.jp/kurosu-narumi/

Sport
- Country: Japan
- Sport: Pentathlon
- Club: Ibaraki Pentathlon AC
- Updated on 23 August 2015

Narumi Kurosu (黒須 成美, Kurosu Narumi; born 22 October 1991) is a Japanese modern pentathlete. Kurosu is from Shimotsuma, Ibaraki. Her training facilities were devastated in the 2011 Tōhoku earthquake risking her qualification for the 2012 Summer Olympics. However, she was offered suitable training facilities by a South Korean coach and she relocated to the country for training. Kurosu qualified for the Olympic Games at the Asian Championships.

At the 2012 Summer Olympics, she competed in the women's competition, finishing in 34th place. In the riding discipline, she drew Zafira, an unfavorable horse, which caused her to tire in time the combined running and shooting discipline was underway. In the discipline – the last discipline of the last event of the Olympic Games – she was the last sportsperson to finish an event, which earned her cheers of encouragement from the crowd.

At the 2013 Asian Championships, she was part of the Japanese team that won silver.
