= Denys Pavlyuk =

Ukrainian modern pentathlete

Personal information
- Nationality: Ukrainian
- Born: 15 January 1992 (age 34)

Sport
- Country: Ukraine
- Sport: Modern pentathlon
Medal record
Representing Ukraine
World Championships
Bronze medal – third place	2015 Berlin	Team
Bronze medal – third place	2018 Mexico City	Team
European Championships
Bronze medal – third place	2018 Szekesfehervar	Team

Denys Pavlyuk (Ukrainian: Денис Павлюк; born 15 January 1992) is a Ukrainian modern pentathlete. He is 2018 European bronze medalist in men's team competition.
