= 2018 World Modern Pentathlon Championships =

International sports competition

- Location: Mexico City, Mexico
- Dates: 6–15 September

The 2018 World Modern Pentathlon Championships was held in Mexico City, Mexico from 6 to 15 September 2018.

== Medal summary ==
=== Medal table ===
Rank	Nation	Gold	Silver	Bronze	Total
1	France (FRA)	2	2	2	6
2	Belarus (BLR)	2	0	0	2
3	Germany (GER)	1	2	1	4
4	Great Britain (GBR)	1	1	0	2
4	Hungary (HUN)	1	1	0	2
6	Czech Republic (CZE)	0	1	0	1
7	Ukraine (UKR)	0	0	2	2
8	Bulgaria (BUL)	0	0	1	1
8	Guatemala (GUA)	0	0	1	1
Totals (9 entries)		7	7	7	21

=== Men ===
Event	Gold		Silver		Bronze	
Individual	James Cooke; Great Britain	1435	Valentin Prades; France	1435	Pavlo Tymoshchenko; Ukraine	1429
Team	France; Valentin Prades; Valentin Belaud; Brice Loubet	4250	Great Britain; James Cooke; Myles Pillage; Joe Choong	4176	Ukraine; Pavlo Tymoshchenko; Denys Pavlyuk; Yuriy Fedechko	4151
Relay	France; Alexandre Henrard; Valentin Belaud	1518	Czech Republic; Jan Kuf; Martin Vlach	1513	Bulgaria; Todor Mihalev; Yavor Peshleevski	1482

=== Women ===
Event	Gold		Silver		Bronze	
Individual	Anastasiya Prokopenko; Belarus	1346	Annika Schleu; Germany	1332	Marie Oteiza; France	1329
Team	Hungary; Sarolta Kovács; Zsófia Földházi; Tamara Alekszejev	3924	France; Marie Oteiza; Julie Belhamri; Élodie Clouvel	3918	Germany; Annika Schleu; Janine Kohlmann; Anna Matthes	3914
Relay	Belarus; Anastasiya Prokopenko; Iryna Prasiantsova	1381	Germany; Ronja Steinborn; Annika Schleu	1364	Guatemala; Sofia Cabrera; Sophia Hernández	1353

=== Mixed ===
Event	Gold		Silver		Bronze	
Relay	Germany; Rebecca Langrehr; Fabian Liebig	1452	Hungary; Michelle Gulyás; Gergő Bruckmann	1427	France; Emma Riff; Alexandre Henrard	1416

== Broadcasting rights ==
Country/Region	Broadcaster
Africa	Supersport, M-Net, CSN, Kwese
Asia	Fox Asia
Australia	Fox Sports
Brazil	Globosat
China	CCTV5
Croatia	Sports TV
Egypt	DMC
Europe	Fox Europe
Fiji	Fiji Broadcasting Corporation
Finland	MTV Finland
France	L'Equipe
Hong Kong	Now TV
Hungary	MTVA
Ireland	RTÉ
Israel	Fox Sports
Lithuania	Sport1, Lietuvos rytas TV
Mexico	TBC, Canal Once
Middle East	OSN Sports, Dubai Sports Channel
Mongolia	TV5
Papua New Guinea	EM TV
Poland	Sportklub
Portugal	Sport TV
Russia	Match TV
Turkey	Fox Sports
United Kingdom	Sky Sports, BBC
International	Eleven Sports, Olympic Channel, UIPMTV
