= Julie Belhamri =

French modern pentathlete

Personal information
- Nationality: French
- Born: 4 April 1994 (age 32)

Sport
- Country: France
- Sport: Modern pentathlon
Medal record
World Championships
Silver medal – second place	2018 Mexico City	Team
Bronze medal – third place	2017 Cairo	Mixed relay
European Championships
Bronze medal – third place	2018 Székesfehérvár	Team

Julie Belhamri (born 4 April 1994) is a French modern pentathlete.

She participated at the 2018 World Modern Pentathlon Championships, winning a medal.
