= 2018 European Modern Pentathlon Championships =

2018 European Championships
- Location: Székesfehérvár, Hungary
- Dates: 17–23 July

The 2018 European Modern Pentathlon Championships was held in Székesfehérvár, Hungary from 17 to 23 July 2018.

== Medal summary ==
=== Men's events ===
Event	Gold	Silver	Bronze
Individual	(France) Valentin Prades	(Hungary) Ádám Marosi	(United Kingdom) Joseph Choong
Team	France; Valentin Prades; Valentin Belaud; Christopher Patte	Hungary; Ádám Marosi; Bence Demeter; Gergely Regős	Ukraine; Pavlo Tymoshchenko; Yuriy Fedechko; Denys Pavlyuk
Relay	France; Simon Casse; Brice Loubet	Germany; Marvin Dogue; Matthias Sandten	Latvia; Pāvels Švecovs; Ruslans Nakoņečnijs

=== Women's events ===
Event	Gold	Silver	Bronze
Individual	(France) Marie Oteiza	(United Kingdom) Kate French	(Hungary) Sarolta Kovács
Team	Hungary; Sarolta Kovács; Tamara Alekszejev; Zsófia Földházi	Ireland; Natalya Coyle; Eilidh Prise; Sive Brassil	France; Marie Oteiza; Julie Belhamri; Manon Barbaza
Relay	Belarus; Volha Silkina; Iryna Prasiantsova	Ireland; Kate Coleman-Lenehan; Eilidh Prise	Russia; Ekaterina Khuraskina; Svetlana Lebedeva

=== Mixed events ===
Event	Gold	Silver	Bronze
Relay	France; Marie Oteiza; Valentin Prades	Italy; Alessandra Frezza; Valerio Grasselli	Hungary; Sarolta Kovács; Bence Demeter

=== Medal table ===
* Host nation (Hungary)

Rank	Nation	Gold	Silver	Bronze	Total
1	France	5	0	1	6
2	Hungary*	1	2	2	5
3	Belarus	1	0	0	1
4	Ireland	0	2	0	2
5	Great Britain	0	1	1	2
6	Germany	0	1	0	1
6	Italy	0	1	0	1
8	Latvia	0	0	1	1
8	Russia	0	0	1	1
8	Ukraine	0	0	1	1
Totals (10 entries)		7	7	7	21
