= Kate French (modern pentathlete) =

British modern pentathlete (born 1991)

Kate French MBE
Personal information
- Born: 11 February 1991 (age 35) Gravesend, England
- Home town: Gravesend, England
- Height: 1.74 m (5 ft 9 in)
- Weight: 60 kg (132 lb)

Sport
- Country: United Kingdom
- Sport: Modern Pentathlon
- Coached by: Istvan Nemeth
Medal record
Women's modern pentathlon
Representing Great Britain
Olympic Games
| Gold medal – first place | 2020 Tokyo | Individual |
World Championships
| Gold medal – first place | 2013 Kaoshiung | Team |
| Silver medal – second place | 2019 Budapest | Team |
| Silver medal – second place | 2014 Warsaw | Team |
| Silver medal – second place | 2014 Warsaw | Mixed Relay |
| Bronze medal – third place | 2019 Budapest | Individual |
European Championships
| Gold medal – first place | 2022 Székesfehérvár | Team |
| Gold medal – first place | 2022 Székesfehérvár | Mixed relay |
| Gold medal – first place | 2019 Bath | Team |
| Gold medal – first place | 2015 Bath | Team |
| Gold medal – first place | 2013 Drzonkow | Team relay |
| Gold medal – first place | 2013 Drzonkow | Team |
| Silver medal – second place | 2019 Bath | Individual |
| Silver medal – second place | 2018 Szekesfehervar | Individual |
| Silver medal – second place | 2016 Sofia | Team |
World Cup
| Gold medal – first place | 2015 Sarasota | Individual |
| Bronze medal – third place | 2012 Rostov | Individual |
Junior World Championships
| Gold medal – first place | 2010 Szekesfehervar | Team |
Junior European Championships
| Gold medal – first place | 2010 Golega | Team |

Katherine Elizabeth French (born 11 February 1991) is a British former modern pentathlete who won the gold medal at the 2020 Summer Olympics in Tokyo, Japan.

== Personal life ==
French was born on 11 February 1991 in Meopham, near Gravesend, Kent. She was privately educated at the independent Cobham Hall School. She completed a degree in sports performance at the University of Bath, where she also trains at the Pentathlon GB High Performance Centre.

French is married and lives in Chapmanslade, Wiltshire.

== Modern pentathlon ==
In 2013 French finished in tenth place in the individual event at both the World Championships in held in Kaoshiung, Taiwan and at the European Championships held in Drzonków, Poland. At the European Championships she also won gold medals in the women's team event, competing alongside Mhairi Spence and Samantha Murray, and in the women's relay event, with Murray and Katy Burke. At the World Championships French, Murray and Spence also won the gold medal in the team event.

At the 2014 World Modern Pentathlon Championships held in Warsaw, Poland, French won two silver medals. Competing with Freyja Prentice and Samantha Murray she was part of the women's team that finished second behind China and in the mixed relay event; French and Joe Evans finished second behind Justinas Kinderis and Laura Asadauskaitė of Lithuania.

She qualified for the modern pentathlon at the 2016 Summer Olympics by finishing eighth at the 2015 European Championships held in Bath. French was placed fifteenth after the first three events but missed only a single target during the combined run and shooting event to secure the top eight finish needed for Olympic qualification. At the same event she won a gold medal in the team event, competing alongside Samantha Murray and Freyja Prentice, who finished tenth and thirteenth in the individual event.

In 2016 she placed 5th at the Olympic games after a consistent performance throughout all events, including winning the riding event with a perfect clear round. 2017 saw her most successful season with a silver medal at World Cup 1 in Los Angeles and a gold medal at World Cup 2 in Cairo. Due to this success she achieved a world ranking high of number 2.

In 2018 French won the silver medal in the individual event at the European Championships held in Székesfehérvár, Hungary. The following year, she repeated her silver medal-winning performance in the individual event and also won gold in the team event at the European Championships held in Bath, England.

In 2021 she won gold at the Tokyo 2020 Olympic Games, the first British competitor to win since Steph Cook took gold at the Sydney games in 2000. She also broke the Olympic record for overall points in the event.

French was appointed Member of the Order of the British Empire (MBE) in the 2022 New Year Honours for services to modern pentathlon.

French took the 2023 season off. She returned to competition in 2024 and on 26 June, she was announced as part of the Great Britain team for the Paris Olympics to be held later that year. She qualified for the final at the Games with a fifth place finish in her semi-final but withdrew due to illness on the morning of the competition.

French announced her retirement from modern pentathlon on 21 January 2025.
