= Natalya Coyle =

Irish modern pentathlete (born 1992)

Personal information
- Nationality: Irish
- Born: 11 December 1992 (age 33) Dublin, Ireland
- Height: 1.70 m (5 ft 7 in)
- Weight: 60 kg (130 lb)

Sport
- Country: Ireland
- Sport: Modern pentathlon
- Coached by: Andy MacKenzie

Achievements and titles
- Personal best(s): Fencing: 936 points 200m swim: 2:19.33; Riding: 0.00 penalties Run and Shoot 11:35.46
Medal record
Representing Ireland
World Modern Pentathlon Championships
Bronze medal – third place	2015 Berlin	Mixed relay
Modern Pentathlon World Cup
Gold medal – first place	2016 Sarasota	Mixed relay
Gold medal – first place	2017 Vilnius	Mixed relay
European Modern Pentathlon Championships
Silver medal – second place	2018 Székesfehérvár	Team
- Updated on 19 August 2016

Natalya Coyle (born 11 December 1992) is an Irish athlete who competed in the modern pentathlon at the 2012 Summer Olympics where she finished ninth, the 2016 Summer Olympics where she finished sixth, and 2020 Summer Olympics where she finished twenty fourth.

Coyle was the flag-bearer for Team Ireland for the Tokyo 2020 Closing Ceremony.
