= Jan Kuf =

Czech modern pentathlete (born 1991)

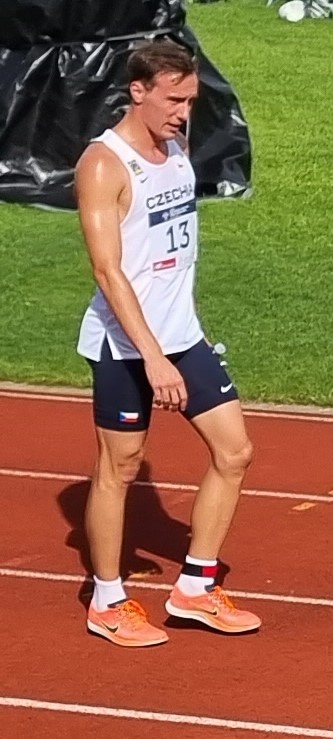
- Jan Kuf at the 2023 World Modern Pentathlon Championships

Personal information
- Nationality: Czech
- Born: 11 May 1991 (age 35) Prague, Czech Republic
- Height: 1.85 m (6 ft 1 in)
- Weight: 78 kg (172 lb)

Sport
- Country: Czech Republic
- Sport: Modern pentathlon
Medal record
Men's modern pentathlon
Representing Czech Republic
World Championships
Gold medal – first place	2015 Berlin	Mixed relay
Silver medal – second place	2018 Mexico City	Relay
Bronze medal – third place	2014 Warsaw	Individual
European Championships
Gold medal – first place	2016 Sofia	Individual
Gold medal – first place	2016 Sofia	Mixed relay
Gold medal – first place	2022 Székesfehérvár	Relay
Silver medal – second place	2013 Drzonków	Relay
Bronze medal – third place	2012 Sofia	Team
Bronze medal – third place	2014 Székesfehérvár	Team
Bronze medal – third place	2015 Bath	Team
Bronze medal – third place	2019 Bath	Team

Jan Kuf (born 11 May 1991) is a Czech athlete who competes in the modern pentathlon. His biggest success so far came in 2016, when he became the European champion in individual race and mixed relay (with Natalie Dianová). He owns gold medal from 2015 World Modern Pentathlon Championships in Berlin in mixed relay as well.
