= Dimitar Krastanov =

Bulgarian modern pentathlete

Personal information
- Born: 31 January 1994 (age 32)

Sport
- Country: Bulgaria
- Sport: Modern pentathlon

Dimitar Krastanov (Bulgarian: Димитър Кръстанов) (born 31 January 1994) is a Bulgarian modern pentathlete. He competed at the 2016 Summer Olympics in Rio de Janeiro, in the men's event.
