= Andriy Fedechko =

Ukrainian modern pentathlete

Personal information
- Born: 4 December 1990 (age 35)

Sport
- Country: Ukraine
- Sport: Modern pentathlon
Medal record
Representing Ukraine
World Championships
Bronze medal – third place	2015 Berlin	Individual
European Championships
Silver medal – second place	2019 Bath	Relay

Andriy Fedechko (Ukrainian: Андрій Миронович Федечко; born 4 December 1990) is a Ukrainian modern pentathlete. He competed at the 2016 Summer Olympics in Rio de Janeiro, in the men's event.
