= Eva Trautmann =

German modern pentathlete

Personal information
- Nationality: Germany
- Born: 18 June 1982 (age 44) Darmstadt, West Germany
- Height: 1.70 m (5 ft 7 in)
- Weight: 56 kg (123 lb)

Sport
- Sport: Modern pentathlon
- Club: SVMF Darmstadt
Medal record
Women's modern pentathlon
Representing Germany
World Championships
Silver medal – second place	2007 Berlin	Team
Bronze medal – third place	2007 Berlin	Relay

Eva Trautmann (born 18 June 1982 in Darmstadt) is a modern pentathlete from Germany. She competed at the 2008 Summer Olympics in Beijing, and qualified for the women's event, where she finished in twenty-ninth place, with a score of 5,028 points.

Trautmann also claimed the team silver medal at the 2007 World Modern Pentathlon Championships in Berlin, along with her compatriots Lena Schöneborn, who won gold in Beijing by the following year, and Claudia Knack.
