= Gergő Bruckmann =

Hungarian modern pentathlete

Personal information
- Nationality: Hungarian
- Born: 15 July 1995 (age 30)

Sport
- Country: Hungary
- Sport: Modern pentathlon
Medal record
World Championships
Silver medal – second place	2018 Mexico City	Mixed relay

Gergő Bruckmann (born 14 July 1995) is a Hungarian modern pentathlete. He participated at the 2018 World Modern Pentathlon Championships, winning a medal.
