= Ruslans Nakoņečnijs =

Ukrainian-Latvian modern pentathlete

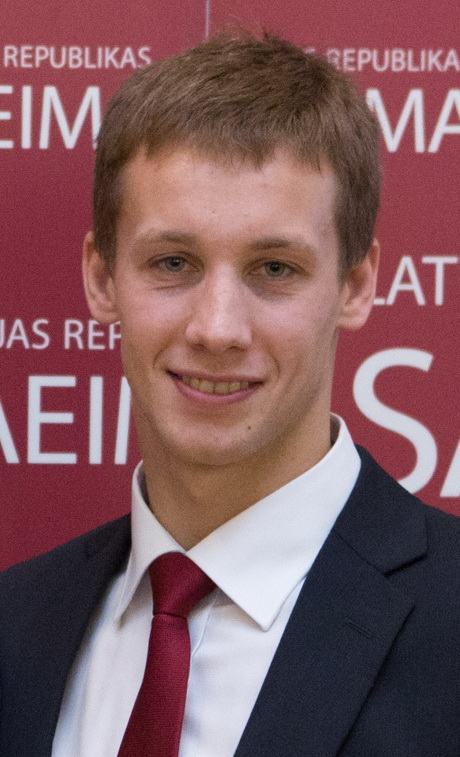
- Nakoņečnijs in 2015

Personal information
- Born: 21 April 1989 (age 37) Mariupol, Ukrainian SSR

Sport
- Country: Ukraine (until 2014); Latvia (2015–present)
- Sport: Modern pentathlon

Ruslans Nakoņečnijs or Ruslan Nakonechnyi (Ukrainian: Руслан Наконечний, born 21 April 1989) is a Ukrainian-Latvian modern pentathlete. He competed at the 2016 Summer Olympics in Rio de Janeiro, in the men's event.

Born in Ukraine, he was a member of the country's national pentathlon team up to mid-2014, when due to the war in Donbas he fled his native Donetsk Oblast. He began working and training in Latvia and started to compete under the Latvian flag since January 2015. In October, Nakonečnijs received Latvian citizenship for special merit after a vote in the Saeima. On his first race he won the Egyptian stage of the UIPM Pentathlon World Cup.
