= Deniss Čerkovskis =

Latvian modern pentathlete (born 1978)

Personal information
- Born: 2 November 1978 (age 47) Rīga, then part of Latvian SSR, Soviet Union
- Height: 180 cm (5 ft 11 in)
- Weight: 76 kg (168 lb)

Sport
- Country: Latvia
- Sport: Modern Pentathlon
- Coached by: Mihails Jefremenko
Medal record
Men's modern pentathlon
Representing Latvia
World Championships
Silver medal – second place	2013 Kaoshiung	Mixed relay
- Updated on 2 September 2013

Deniss Čerkovskis (born 2 November 1978) is a Latvian modern pentathlete who competed in: the 2000 Summer Olympics in Sydney (18th place), the 2004 Summer Olympics in Athens (4th place), and the 2008 Summer Olympics in Beijing (11th place). He also competed at the 2012 Summer Olympics (finishing in 19th place).

In 2001, Čerkovskis was disqualified for two years for doping use.
