= Christian Zillekens =

German modern pentathlete (born 1995)

Personal information
- Nationality: German
- Born: 29 December 1995 (age 30) Neuss, Germany
- Height: 179 cm (5 ft 10 in)
- Weight: 68 kg (150 lb)

Sport
- Country: Germany
- Sport: Modern pentathlon
- Club: OSC Potsdam
- Coached by: Claudia Adermann

Achievements and titles
- Olympic finals: 21 Place, Rio 2016
- Highest world ranking: 1st Place Youth A WM 2013, China Wuhan; 1st Place 2012 Youth A relay; 1st place mix-relay youth A, Russia; 2nd place Team World Championships 2013 China, Wuhan; 2nd place Relay European Championships 2014; 4 place european Championships Junior 2014 belarus; 5th Place world cup Rom, Italy 2016; 6th Place world cup Rio, Brazil 2016

Christian Zillekens (born 29 December 1995 in Neuss) is a German modern pentathlete. He competed at the 2016 Summer Olympics in Rio de Janeiro, in the men's event. He finished in 21st place. He is married to fellow modern pentathlete Annika Schleu.
