= Pavlo Tymoshchenko =

Ukrainian modern pentathlete (born 1986)

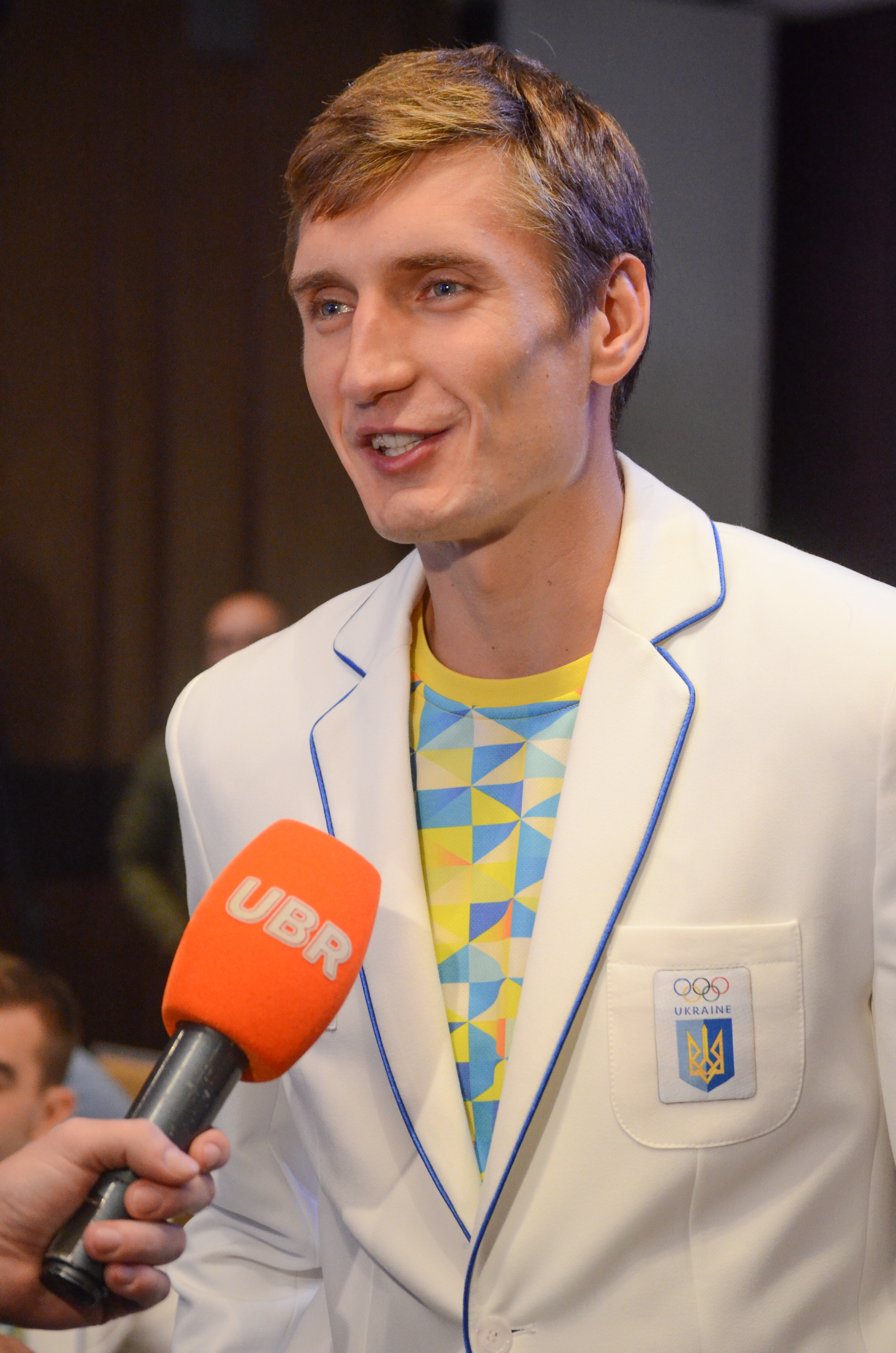
- Tymoshchenko at the 2016 Olympics

Personal information
- Full name: Pavlo Yuriyovych Tymoshchenko
- Nationality: Ukrainian
- Born: 13 October 1986 (age 39) Kyiv, Ukrainian SSR, Soviet Union
- Height: 192 cm (6 ft 4 in)
- Weight: 78 kg (172 lb)

Sport
- Country: Ukraine
- Sport: Modern pentathlon
- Club: Dynamo Kyiv
- Coached by: Iurii Tymoshchenko
Medal record
Representing Ukraine
Olympic Games
Silver medal – second place	2016 Rio de Janeiro	Individual
World Championships
Gold medal – first place	2015 Berlin	Individual
Silver medal – second place	2008 Budapest	Team
Silver medal – second place	2010 Chengdu	Mixed relay
Bronze medal – third place	2011 Moscow	Relay
Bronze medal – third place	2013 Kaoshiung	Mixed relay
Bronze medal – third place	2015 Berlin	Team
Bronze medal – third place	2018 Mexico City	Individual
Bronze medal – third place	2018 Mexico City	Team
European Championships
Gold medal – first place	2013 Drzonków	Mixed relay
Bronze medal – third place	2014 Szekesfehervar	Individual
Bronze medal – third place	2018 Szekesfehervar	Team
Bronze medal – third place	2024 Budapest	Men's relay

Pavlo Yuriyovych Tymoshchenko (Ukrainian: Павло Юрійович Тимощенко; born 13 October 1986) is a Ukrainian modern pentathlete. He competed at the 2008, 2012 and 2016 Summer Olympics, and won the silver medal in 2016.

Tymoshchenko took up modern pentathlon following his father, a former pentathlete. His favorite events are fencing and riding. He works as a police officer.
