= Felipe Nascimento =

Brazilian modern pentathlete

Personal information
- Born: 5 July 1993 (age 32) Recife, Brazil

Sport
- Country: Brazil
- Sport: Modern pentathlon
- Club: Centro Esportivo Salesiano, Recife

Felipe Nascimento (born 5 July 1993) is a Brazilian modern pentathlete. He competed at the 2016 Summer Olympics in Rio de Janeiro, in the men's event.
