= Valentin Belaud =

French modern pentathlete (born 1992)

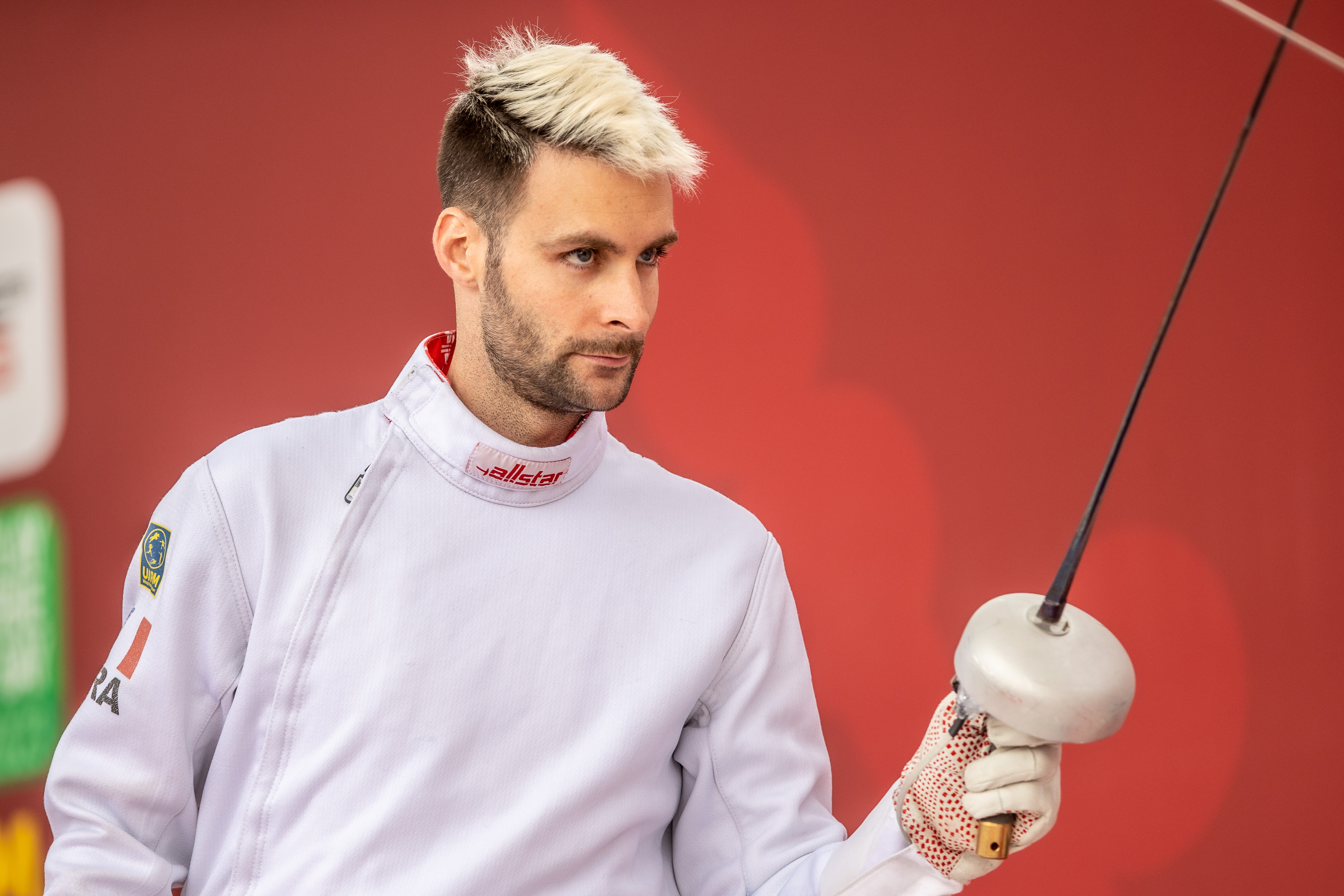
- 2023

Personal information
- Nationality: French
- Born: 16 September 1992 (age 34) Le Chesnay, France
- Height: 1.82 m (6 ft 0 in)
- Weight: 73 kg (161 lb)

Sport
- Country: France
- Sport: Modern pentathlon
Medal record
Representing France
World Championships
Gold medal – first place	2013 Kaohsiung	Mixed
Gold medal – first place	2014 Warsaw	Relay
Gold medal – first place	2016 Moscow	Individual
Gold medal – first place	2018 Mexico City	Team
Gold medal – first place	2018 Mexico City	Relay
Gold medal – first place	2019 Budapest	Individual
Gold medal – first place	2022 Alexandria	Team
Silver medal – second place	2014 Warsaw	Team
Silver medal – second place	2016 Moscow	Team
Silver medal – second place	2019 Budapest	Mixed
Bronze medal – third place	2017 Cairo	Mixed
Bronze medal – third place	2026 Guiyang	Team
European Games
Silver medal – second place	2023 Kraków-Małopolska	Team
European Championships
Gold medal – first place	2013 Drzonków	Relay
Gold medal – first place	2015 Bath	Team
Gold medal – first place	2018 Székesfehérvár	Team
Silver medal – second place	2014 Székesfehérvár	Relay
Silver medal – second place	2016 Sofia	Team
Silver medal – second place	2019 Bath	Team
Silver medal – second place	2022 Székesfehérvár	Team
Silver medal – second place	2023 Kraków	Team
Silver medal – second place	2026 Istanbul	Team
Bronze medal – third place	2017 Minsk	Individual
Bronze medal – third place	2017 Minsk	Team

Valentin Belaud (born 16 September 1992) is a French modern pentathlete. He competed at the 2016 Summer Olympics in Rio de Janeiro, in the men's event.

After returning from the 2019 Military World Games in October, he and his partner Élodie Clouvel admitted that both of them were infected with COVID-19 after falling ill with developing unusual symptoms.
