= Jose Ricardo Figueroa =

Cuban modern pentathlete (born 1991)

Personal information
- Born: 10 January 1991 (age 35)

Sport
- Country: Cuba
- Sport: Modern pentathlon
Medal record
Representing Cuba
Pan American Games
Silver medal – second place	2019 Lima	Mixed relay

Jose Ricardo Figueroa (born 10 January 1991) is a Cuban modern pentathlete. He competed at the 2016 Summer Olympics in Rio de Janeiro, in the men's event.
