= Emmanuel Zapata =

Argentine modern pentathlete

Personal information
- Full name: Emmanuel Gerardo Zapata
- Nickname: Emma
- Born: 7 October 1986 (age 39) Buenos Aires, Argentina
- Height: 1.80
- Weight: 75 kg (165 lb)

Sport
- Country: Argentina
- Sport: Modern pentathlon
- Coached by: Guillermo Filipi

Achievements and titles
- World finals: World Championships Warsaw, Poland 2014; World Championships Cairo, Egypt 2017.
Medal record
Representing Argentina
Pan American Games
Bronze medal – third place	Lima 2019	Relay
Pan American Championship
Gold medal – first place	Lima 2018	Men’s individual
Bronze medal – third place	Mexico City 2014	Men’s individual
Silver medal – second place	Santo Domingo 2013	Men’s individual
CISM Military Games
Bronze medal – third place	Rio de Janeiro 2011	Men's individual

Emmanuel Zapata (born 7 October 1986) is an Argentine modern pentathlete. He competed at the 2016 Summer Olympics in Rio de Janeiro, in the men's event.
