= Ekaterina Khuraskina =

Russian modern pentathlete

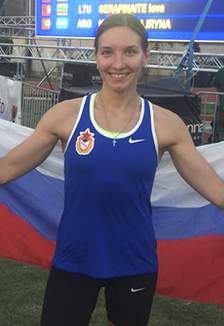

Personal information
- Full name: Ekaterina Vasilyevna Khuraskina
- Born: 21 August 1989 (age 36) Moscow, Russia
- Height: 1.65 m (5 ft 5 in)
- Weight: 53 kg (117 lb)

Sport
- Country: Russia
- Sport: Modern pentathlon
- Coached by: Alexei Khaplanov
Medal record
World Championships
Gold medal – first place	2010 Chengdu	Relay
Bronze medal – third place	2011 Moscow	Team
European Championships
Gold medal – first place	2019 Bath	Relay
Gold medal – first place	2012 Sofia	Team
Silver medal – second place	2009 Leipzig	Team
Silver medal – second place	2015 Bath	Relay
Bronze medal – third place	2018 Székesfehérvár	Relay
Military World Games
Silver medal – second place	2019 Wuhan	Team
- Updated on 4 April 2013

Ekaterina Vasilyevna Khuraskina (Russian: Екатерина Васильевна Хураскина; born 21 August 1989) is a Russian modern pentathlete. At the 2012 Summer Olympics, she competed in the women's competition, finishing in 17th place. Khuraskina was born in Moscow.
