= Riccardo De Luca =

Italian modern pentathlete (born 1986)

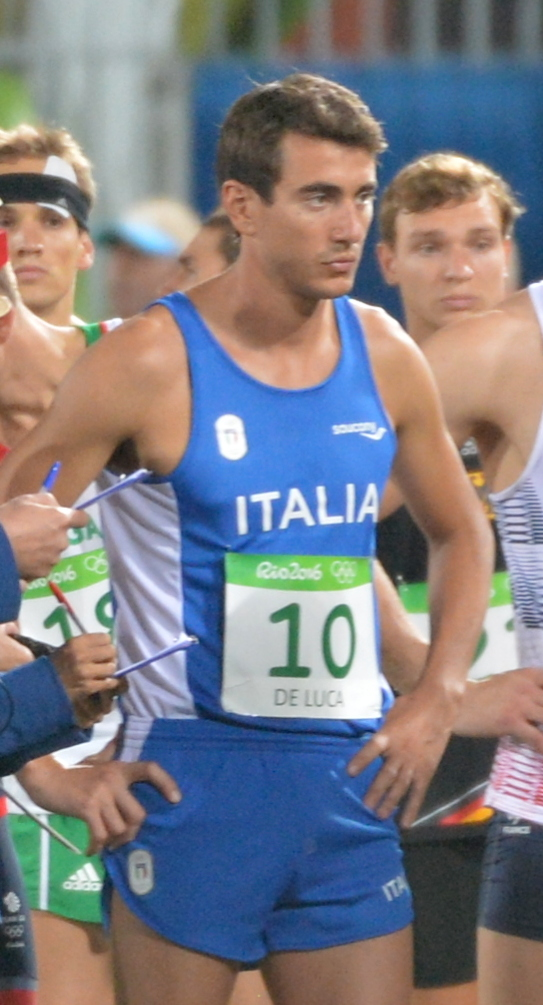
- De Luca at the 2016 Olympics

Personal information
- Born: 22 March 1986 (age 40) Rome, Italy
- Height: 187 cm (6 ft 2 in)
- Weight: 78 kg (172 lb)

Sport
- Sport: Modern pentathlon
- Club: C.S. Carabinieri
- Coached by: Marco Quattrini; Luigi Filipponi
Medal record
Representing Italy
World Championships
Bronze medal – third place	2011 Moscow	Team
Gold medal – first place	2012 Rome	Team
European Championships
Bronze medal – third place	2013 Drzonków	Team
Silver medal – second place	2014 Székesfehérvár	Team
Bronze medal – third place	2015 Bath	Individual
Bronze medal – third place	2016 Sofia	Individual

Riccardo De Luca (born 22 March 1986) is an Italian modern pentathlete. De Luca is an athlete of the Centro Sportivo Carabinieri.

== Biography ==
He won a team gold medal at the 2012 World Championships and placed nine and fifth at the 2012 and 2016 Olympics, respectively. De Luca took up pentathlon in 1999. He works as a police officer.
