= Valentin Prades =

French modern pentathlete (born 1992)

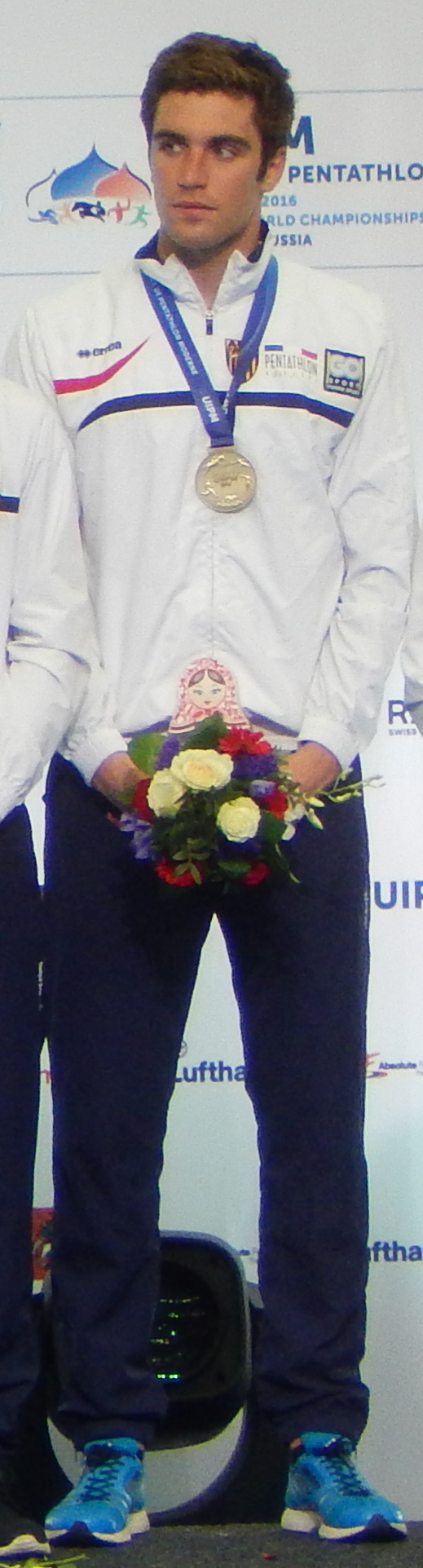

Personal information
- Nationality: French
- Born: 26 September 1992 (age 33) Cannes, France
- Height: 1.93 m (6 ft 4 in)
- Weight: 88 kg (194 lb)

Sport
- Country: France
- Sport: Modern pentathlon
Medal record
Representing France
World Championships
| Gold medal – first place | 2013 Kaoshiung | Team |
| Gold medal – first place | 2014 Warsaw | Relay |
| Gold medal – first place | 2018 Mexico City | Team |
| Gold medal – first place | 2022 Alexandria | Team |
| Silver medal – second place | 2014 Warsaw | Team |
| Silver medal – second place | 2016 Moscow | Team |
| Silver medal – second place | 2018 Mexico City | Individual |
European Games
| Silver medal – second place | 2023 Kraków-Małopolska | Team |
European Championships
| Gold medal – first place | 2013 Drzonków | Relay |
| Gold medal – first place | 2015 Bath | Team |
| Gold medal – first place | 2018 Székesfehérvár | Individual |
| Gold medal – first place | 2018 Székesfehérvár | Team |
| Gold medal – first place | 2018 Székesfehérvár | Mixed relay |
| Silver medal – second place | 2013 Drzonków | Team |
| Silver medal – second place | 2014 Székesfehérvár | Relay |
| Silver medal – second place | 2015 Bath | Individual |
| Silver medal – second place | 2019 Bath | Individual |
| Silver medal – second place | 2019 Bath | Team |
| Silver medal – second place | 2023 Kraków | Team |
| Bronze medal – third place | 2017 Minsk | Team |

Valentin Prades (born 26 September 1992) is a French modern pentathlete. He competed at the 2016 Summer Olympics in Rio de Janeiro, in the men's event.

== Biography ==
Valentin Prades studied Business Administration at Grenoble Alpes University and Emlyon Business School.
