= Melanie McCann =

Canadian modern pentathlete (born 1989)

Personal information
- Full name: Melanie J. McCann
- Born: 8 October 1989 (age 36) Clinton, Ontario, Canada
- Height: 1.75 m (5 ft 9 in)
- Weight: 53 kg (117 lb)

Sport
- Country: Canada
- Sport: Modern pentathlon

Achievements and titles
- Olympic finals: 11th (2012) 15th (2016)
- Highest world ranking: 14

Melanie J. McCann (born 8 October 1989) is a Canadian modern pentathlete and a member of the Canadian national team. McCann placed 4th at the 2011 Pan American Games which qualified her to compete in the following Olympics. At the 2012 Summer Olympics, she finished in 11th place in the women's competition. In June 2016, she was named in Canada's Olympic team, and finished 15h at the Olympics.
