= Isabel Brand =

Guatemalan modern pentathlete (born 1996)

Personal information
- Nationality: Guatemalan
- Born: 23 June 1996 (age 29) Zürich, Switzerland

Sport
- Country: Guatemala
- Sport: Modern pentathlon

Isabel Brand (born 23 June 1996) is a Guatemalan modern pentathlete. She qualified for the 2016 Summer Olympics.
