= Janine Kohlmann =

German modern pentathlete (born 1990)

Personal information
- Nationality: German
- Born: 28 November 1990 (age 35) Düsseldorf, Germany
- Height: 1.70 m (5 ft 7 in)
- Weight: 51 kg (112 lb)

Sport
- Country: Germany
- Sport: Modern Pentathlon
Medal record
Women's modern pentathlon
Representing Germany
World Championships
Gold medal – first place	2012 Rome	Relay
Gold medal – first place	2021 Cairo	Team
Silver medal – second place	2015 Berlin	Team
Bronze medal – third place	2007 Berlin	Relay
Bronze medal – third place	2016 Moscow	Team
Bronze medal – third place	2018 Mexico City	Team
Bronze medal – third place	2019 Budapest	Team
European Games
Gold medal – first place	2023 Kraków-Małopolska	Team
European Championships
Gold medal – first place	2014 Székesfehérvár	Team
Gold medal – first place	2023 Kraków	Team
Silver medal – second place	2015 Bath	Team
Silver medal – second place	2016 Sofia	Relay

Janine Kohlmann (born November 28, 1990) is a German modern pentathlete. She got the gold medal in the relay event at the 2012 World Championships.
