= Donna Vakalis =

Canadian modern pentathlete

Personal information
- Full name: Donna Marie Vakalis
- Born: 30 December 1979 (age 46) Toronto, Ontario, Canada
- Height: 1.64 m (5 ft 5 in)
- Weight: 53 kg (117 lb)
- Website: thisisdonna.com

Sport
- Country: Canada
- Sport: Modern pentathlon

Achievements and titles
- Olympic finals: 29th (2012)

Donna Marie Vakalis (born 30 December 1979) is a Canadian modern pentathlete. At the 2012 Summer Olympics, she competed in the women's competition, finishing in 29th place.

== Athletic career ==
Vakalis became a member of the Canadian national modern pentathlon team in 2009. She qualified for the 2012 Olympics after finishing 20th at the UIPM World Cup Final in Chengdu.

Her personal best is 5348 points, achieved at the 2012 Guatemala Open (where she placed first).

In June 2016, she was named to Canada's Olympic team.

== Personal life ==
Vakalis attended McMaster University in Hamilton, Ontario, receiving an honours bachelor's degree of arts and science. She received a professional master's degree in architecture from the University of Toronto, and began PhD studies there in 2012. Her dissertation is on assessing building projects for the impacts on health and environment.
