= Victoria Tereshchuk =

Ukrainian modern pentathlete

Personal information
- Born: 18 February 1982 (age 44) Voroshilovgrad, Ukrainian SSR, Soviet Union
- Height: 1.71 m (5 ft 7 1/2 in)
- Weight: 59 kg (130 lb)

Sport
- Country: Ukraine
- Sport: Modern pentathlon
- Coached by: Sergey Turobov
Medal record
Women's modern pentathlon
Representing Ukraine
Olympic Games
| Disqualified | 2008 Beijing | Women's |
World Championships
| Gold medal – first place | 2011 Moscow | Individual |
| Gold medal – first place | 2011 Moscow | Mixed relay |
| Gold medal – first place | 2013 Kaoshiung | Relay |
| Silver medal – second place | 2006 Guatemala City | Individual |
| Silver medal – second place | 2010 Chengdu | Mixed relay |
| Bronze medal – third place | 2011 Moscow | Relay |
| Bronze medal – third place | 2013 Kaoshiung | Team |
European Championships
| Gold medal – first place | 2008 Moscow | Individual |
| Gold medal – first place | 2013 Drzonków | Mixed relay |
| Silver medal – second place | 2013 Drzonków | Team |
| Bronze medal – third place | 2011 Medway | Individual |
- Updated on 1 March 2017

Victoria Anatoliïvna Tereshchuk (Терещук Вікторія Анатоліївна; born 18 February 1982) is a female former modern pentathlete from Ukraine. A competitor since 1999 she was awarded a bronze medal in the women's modern pentathlon event at the 2008 Summer Olympics in Beijing but was subsequently stripped of the medal after a doping re-test. She was World Champion in the individual and mixed relay events in 2011. For her World Championship victories, she was named Ukrainian Sportswoman of the Year and received the Order of Princess Olga in the Second Class. She is also the 2008 European Champion and competed at the 2004 and 2012 Olympic modern pentathlon tournaments, where she finished seventh and twenty-third respectively.

== Personal life ==
Tereshchuk was born on 18 February 1982 in Luhansk, Ukraine. She took up modern pentathlon in 1999 and began competing out of ZS Luhansk, where she met her coach Sergey Turobov. Of all the constituent events of modern pentathlon, she considered swimming and the cross-country run to be her specialties and fencing, Turobov's specialty, to be her weakest. She married Turobov in 2005 and missed the 2009 season to have a son.

== International career ==
Tereshchuk participated in her first major international competition in August 2001 when she entered the Junior World Championships in Budapest, Hungary and placed 12th. Her first senior World Championship was the 2003 edition, held in Pesaro, Italy, where she finished 27th, and her first senior European Championship came the following month in Ústí nad Labem, Czech Republic, where she came in 34th. She earned her first podium finish in December when she came in second at a World Cup event, followed by her first victory at the Westel World Cup in May 2004. After coming in 6th at the World Championships later that month in Moscow, Russia, her next stop was the 2004 Summer Olympics, where she finished in 7th.

At the next three European Championships, Tereshchuk finished 30th, 18th, and 16th, and placed 12th at the 2005 World Championships in Warsaw, Poland. She claimed her first World Championship medal, silver, at the 2006 edition in Guatemala City, Guatemala, but then dropped to 34th and 26th the following year at the European and World Championships respectively. In 2008, she finished 23rd in the individual and 7th in the three-member team relay events at the 2008 World Championships in Budapest, but became the European Champion at a tournament held in Moscow. This led to her participation in the 2008 Summer Olympics, where she was awarded a bronze medal in the women's event, finishing behind Lena Schöneborn of Germany and Heather Fell of Great Britain. She was subsequently stripped of the medal after testing positive for the anabolic steroid turinabol in a doping re-test.

After missing the 2009 season to have a child, Tereshchuk returned in 2010 and finished second in that year's mixed relay event at the World Championships in Chengdu, China, in addition to placing 16th in the individual competition. In 2011, she came in third at the European Championships before winning three medals at the World Championships in Moscow: gold in the individual and mixed relay events and bronze in the three-member team relay. As World Champion, she qualified for the 2012 Summer Olympics, was named Ukrainian Sportswoman of the Year, and was awarded the Order of Princess Olga in the Second Class. At the 2012 World Championships in Rome, Italy, however, she failed to qualify for the finals and was eliminated before she was able to defend her individual title, also placing 5th in the mixed relay. In the Olympic tournament that year she finished 23rd in a field of 36 competitors.
