= Aleksander Lesun =

Belarusian-Russian modern pentathlete

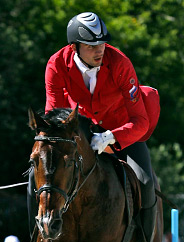

Personal information
- Full name: Aleksander Leonidovich Lesun
- Nationality: Belarus (until 2009); Russia (since 2009)
- Born: 1 July 1988 (age 38) Barysaw, Belarus SSR, Soviet Union
- Height: 1.82 m (6 ft 0 in)
- Weight: 75 kg (165 lb)

Sport
- Sport: Modern pentathlon
- Team: Dynamo
- Coached by: Alexei Khaplanov
Medal record
Men's modern pentathlon
Representing Russia
Olympic Games
Gold medal – first place	2016 Rio de Janeiro	Individual
World Championships
Gold medal – first place	2011 Moscow	Team
Gold medal – first place	2012 Rome	Individual
Gold medal – first place	2014 Warsaw	Individual
Gold medal – first place	2016 Moscow	Mixed Relay
Silver medal – second place	2010 Chengdu	Individual
Silver medal – second place	2011 Moscow	Individual
Silver medal – second place	2012 Rome	Team
Silver medal – second place	2013 Kaohsiung	Team
Silver medal – second place	2015 Berlin	Individual
Silver medal – second place	2016 Moscow	Individual
Bronze medal – third place	2010 Chengdu	Relay
Bronze medal – third place	2013 Kaohsiung	Individual
Bronze medal – third place	2013 Kaohsiung	Relay
Bronze medal – third place	2019 Budapest	Relay
European Championships
Gold medal – first place	2011 Medway	Team
Gold medal – first place	2012 Sofia	Team
Gold medal – first place	2014 Székesfehérvár	Individual
Gold medal – first place	2016 Sofia	Relay
Gold medal – first place	2017 Minsk	Individual
Silver medal – second place	2015 Bath	Team
Silver medal – second place	2017 Minsk	Team
Bronze medal – third place	2013 Drzonków	Individual

Aleksander Leonidovich Lesun (Russian: Александр Леонидович Лесун; born 1 July 1988) is a Belarusian-born naturalized Russian modern pentathlete. He is a multiple-time medalist at the World and European Championships, and was a top-ranked male modern pentathlete in the world by the Union Internationale de Pentathlon Moderne (UIPM).

== Career ==
Lesun started out his sporting career as a swimmer, before switching to modern pentathlon at the very young age. He first competed at the European and World Junior Championships in 2008, and had achieved five top-ten finishes. In late 2009, Lesun moved to Russia from Belarus, and obtained a dual citizenship and a Russian passport.

Lesun returned to the international scene in early 2010, and was formally admitted to the national team. He competed at the World Championships in Chengdu, China, where he won two medals, one for the individual and one for the team relay. He also added his first ever gold medal at the 2010 World Cup in Budapest, Hungary.

In 2012, Lesun emerged as Russia's best medal prospect, and a top favorite to win gold at his first Olympics. He had broken his streak of silver medal finishes in his 2011 breakthrough season and also beat the former world and defending Olympic champion Moiseev to win his first individual gold medal at the 2012 World Modern Pentathlon Championships in Rome, Italy.

Following his triumph, Lesun qualified for the 2012 Summer Olympics in London, along with Moiseev, to compete in the men's event, which included a first-ever combined running and shooting segment. During the competition, Lesun made a strong showing in the fencing segment, tying in second place with China's Cao Zhongrong for a score of twenty-five victories, but struggled to maintain his position in the entire event, with disappointing scores in freestyle swimming and horse riding. At the combined running and shooting discipline, Lesun progressed into the event in third place, until he was surpassed by Hungary's Ádám Marosi to win the bronze medal, dropping him out of the podium to a fourth-place finish, with a score of 5,764 points.

In 2016, he won the gold medal at the Rio Olympics with a total of 1479 points, which was an Olympic record at the time.

At the 2017 World Modern Pentathlon Championships in Cairo, Egypt, Lesun suffered a back injury in the fencing segment, leaving him without a medal in the individual competition. However, he won bronze with his team.

He resigned from the Russian team following the invasion of Ukraine in February 2022, opting to return to Belarus.

== Awards ==
- Order of Friendship (2016)
