= Leydi Moya =

Cuban modern pentathlete (born 1992)

Personal information
- Full name: Leydi Laura Moya; Leidis Laura Moya
- Born: 16 April 1992 (age 34) Havana, Cuba

Sport
- Country: Cuba
- Sport: Modern pentathlon
Medal record
Representing Cuba
Pan American Games
Silver medal – second place	2019 Lima	Relay
Silver medal – second place	2019 Lima	Mixed relay
Bronze medal – third place	2019 Lima	Individual

Leydi Laura Moya (born 16 April 1992), also known as Leidis Laura Moya, is a Cuban modern pentathlete. She competed for Cuba in the 2016 Summer Olympics where she finished 33rd. She competed for Cuba at the 2020 Summer Olympics.
