= Claudia Cesarini =

Italian modern pentathlete (born 1986)

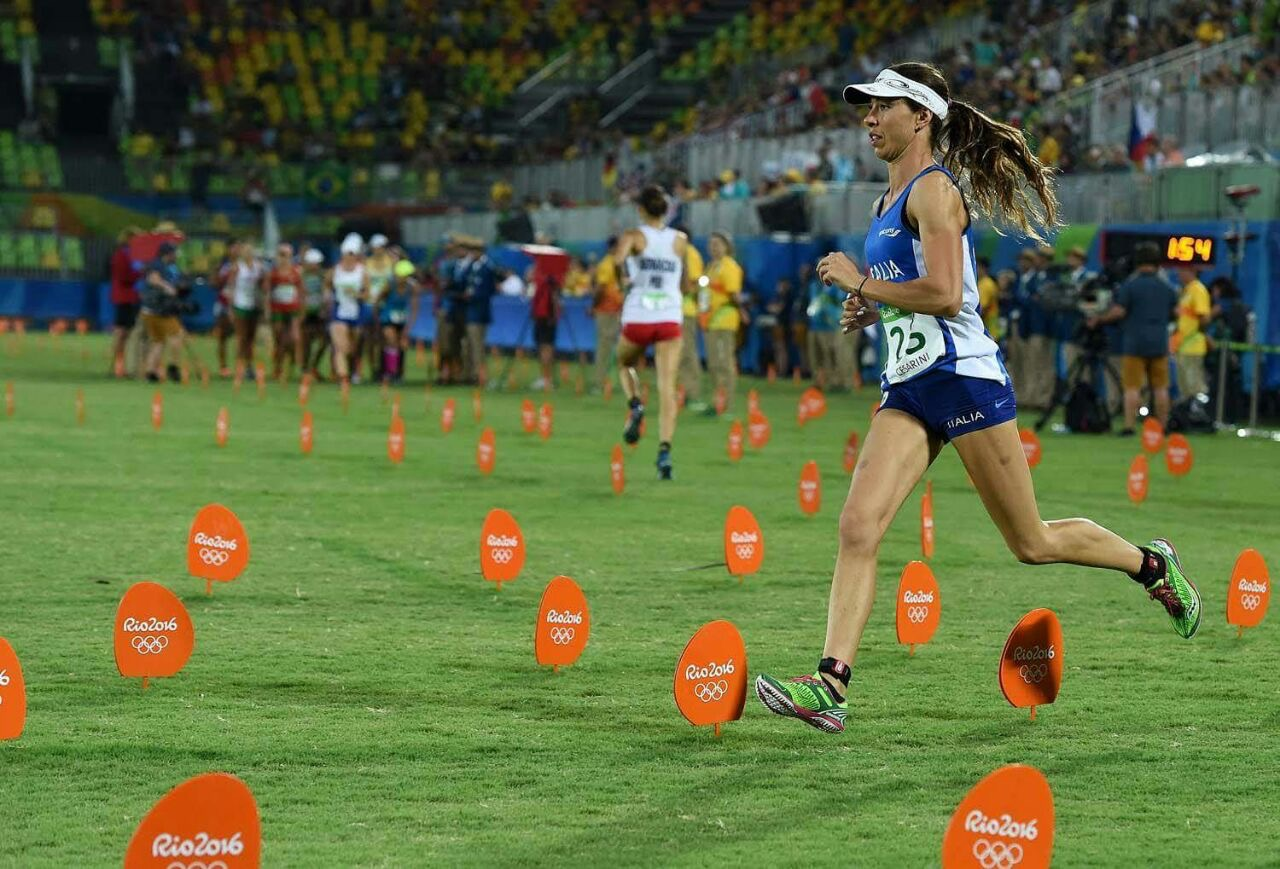
- Cesarini at Rio 2016

Personal information
- Nationality: Italian
- Born: 5 August 1986 (age 38); Rome, Italy
- Height: 1.72 m (5 ft 7 1/2 in)
- Weight: 58 kg (128 lb)

Sport
- Sport: Modern pentathlon
- Club: Fiamme Azzurre

Claudia Cesarini (born 4 August 1986) is an Italian modern pentathlete.

== Biography ==
At the 2012 Summer Olympics, she competed in the women's competition, finishing in 25th place. She also took part in the 2016 Summer Olympics in Rio de Janeiro finishing 23rd. She won two bronze medals in the team event at the Senior Europeans Championships in 2014 and 2015. At the 2016 World Cup #2 in Rio de Janeiro (Olympic Test Event for Rio 2016 Olympics) she won the gold medal in the individual competition. She has been the Italian National Champion in 2010, 2011 and 2013 in the individual competition.
