= Laura Asadauskaitė =

Lithuanian modern pentathlete (born 1984)

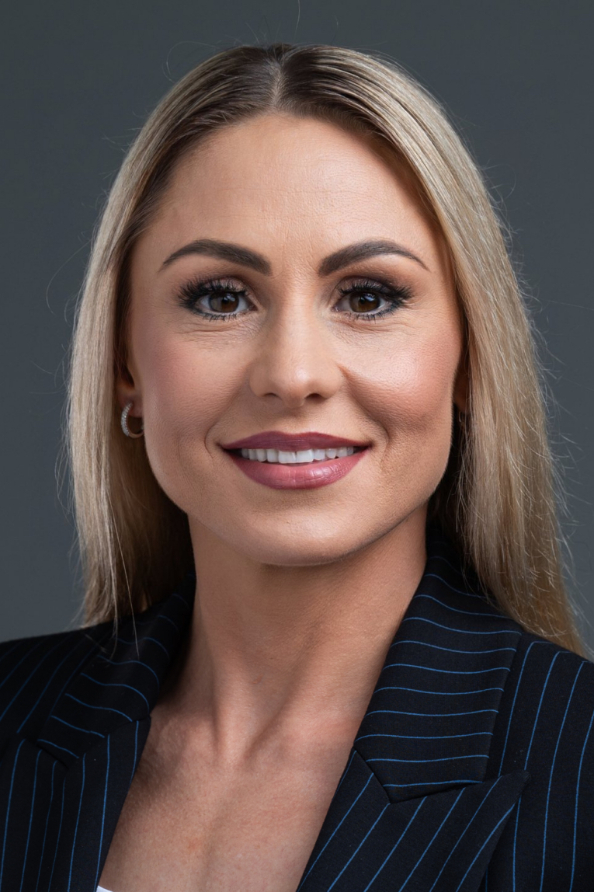
- Asadauskaitė in 2024

Personal information
- Full name: Laura Asadauskaitė-Zadneprovskienė
- Born: 28 February 1984 (age 42) Vilnius, Lithuania
- Height: 1.60 m (5 ft 3 in)
- Weight: 48 kg (106 lb)

Sport
- Country: Lithuania
- Sport: Modern Pentathlon
- Coached by: Jevgenij Kliosov, Andrejus Zadneprovskis
Medal record
Olympic Games
Gold medal – first place	2012 London	Individual
Silver medal – second place	2020 Tokyo	Individual
World Championships
Gold medal – first place	2013 Kaohsiung	Individual
Gold medal – first place	2014 Warsaw	Mixed relay
Silver medal – second place	2009 London	Individual
Bronze medal – third place	2007 Berlin	Individual
Bronze medal – third place	2011 Moscow	Individual
Bronze medal – third place	2011 Moscow	Mixed relay
European Games
Silver medal – second place	2023 Kraków-Małopolska	Team
European Championships
Gold medal – first place	2008 Moscow	Team
Gold medal – first place	2008 Moscow	Relay
Gold medal – first place	2012 Sofia	Individual
Gold medal – first place	2014 Székesfehérvár	Mixed relay
Gold medal – first place	2015 Bath	Individual
Gold medal – first place	2016 Sofia	Individual
Gold medal – first place	2016 Sofia	Team
Gold medal – first place	2019 Bath	Individual
Silver medal – second place	2008 Moscow	Individual
Silver medal – second place	2012 Sofia	Mixed relay
Silver medal – second place	2023 Kraków	Team
Bronze medal – third place	2013 Drzonków	Mixed relay
Bronze medal – third place	2019 Bath	Team
UIPM Biathle World Championships
Silver medal – second place	2004 Germany	Women's senior
- Updated on 11 August 2019

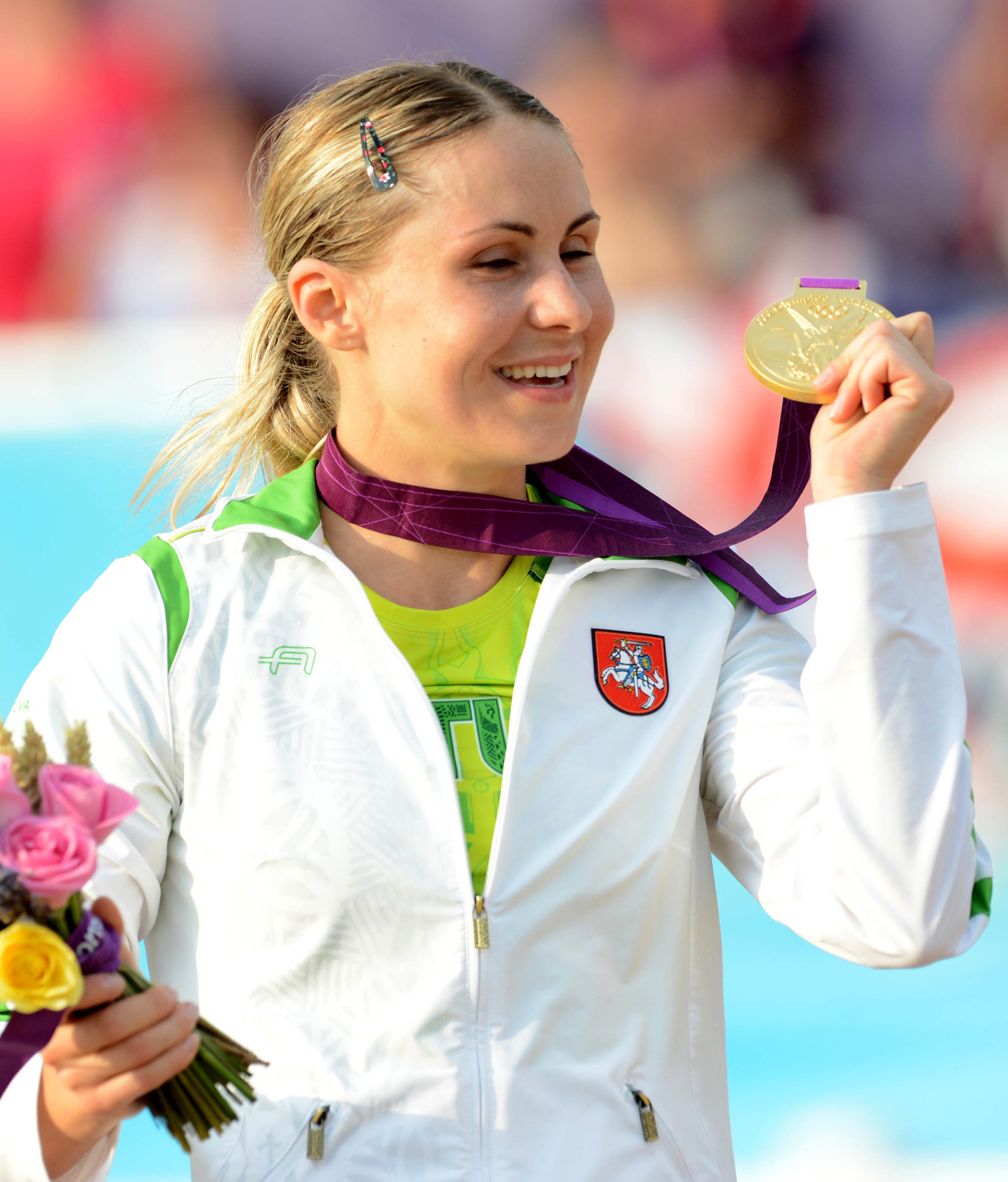
In victory ceremony at 2012 Olympics

Laura Asadauskaitė-Zadneprovskienė (born 28 February 1984) is a Lithuanian former modern pentathlete. She won the gold medal at the 2012 Summer Olympics in London with a then Olympic record score, and silver in Tokyo at the 2020 Summer Olympics. She is a three-time European Champion (2012, 2015, 2016) and was once individual World Champion in pentathlon, having claimed the title in 2013. She has been a member of the Seimas (Parliament of Lithuania) since 2024.

== Career ==
Asadauskaitė took part in her first Olympics at the 2008 Summer Olympics in Beijing, where she finished 15th overall. Asadauskaitė did not compete at all in 2010 after she became a mother for the first time, but became world number one in the modern pentathlon in May 2012. She won Olympic gold at the 2012 Summer Olympics, ahead of British athlete Samantha Murray and Yane Marques of Brazil. Her total score in the event of 5,408 points set a new Olympic record.

Asadauskaitė became world champion for the first time in 2013, winning the gold medal at the 2013 World Modern Pentathlon Championships, with a total of 5,312 points. In 2016, Asadauskaitė won her third gold medal at the European Modern Pentathlon Championships, having previously won it in 2012 and 2015.

In 2021, Asadauskaitė won Lithuania's first medal of the 2020 Summer Olympics in Tokyo, with a silver medal behind British competitor Kate French. In the five-discipline event, she set an Olympic record of 12 minutes, 1.01 seconds in the final running event.

== Political career ==
In 2024, Laura Asadauskaitė-Zadneprovskienė was elected to the Seimas, the Lithuanian Parliament, representing the Social Democratic Party of Lithuania (LSDP).

She serves on the Committee on Education and Science, focusing her efforts on promoting youth sports, physical education, public health, and athlete welfare.

== Personal life ==
In 2009, Asadauskaitė married modern pentathlete Andrejus Zadneprovskis, a former world champion who won two Olympic medals. The following year she gave birth to a daughter. She is a graduate of Mykolas Romeris University, majoring in Administration and European Union Policy.

Awards
Preceded by (Lithuania) Simona Krupeckaitė	Best Lithuanian sportsman of the Year; 2011	Succeeded by (Lithuania) Rūta Meilutytė
Preceded by Rūta Meilutytė	Lithuanian Sportswoman of the Year; 2015	Succeeded by Simona Krupeckaitė
Preceded by Rūta Meilutytė	Lithuanian Sportswoman of the Year; 2019, 2021	Succeeded by Rūta Meilutytė
