= Samantha Murray =

English modern pentathlete

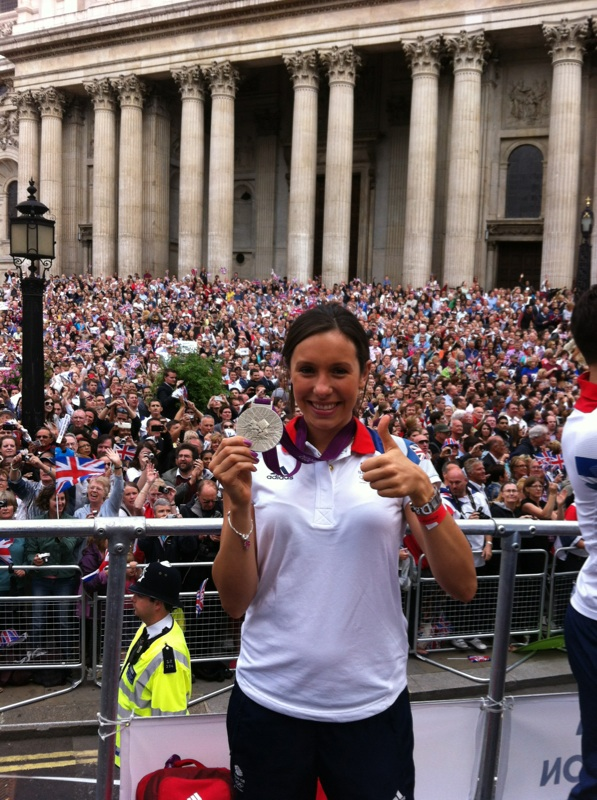
- Samantha Murray with her silver medal at the London 2012 Olympic games after her victory in modern pentathlon

Personal information
- Nationality: British
- Born: 25 September 1989 (age 36) Preston, Lancashire, England
- Height: 1.74 m (5 ft 9 in)
- Weight: 60 kg (132 lb)

Sport
- Country: United Kingdom
- Sport: Modern Pentathlon
- Coached by: Istvan Nemeth
Medal record
Women's modern pentathlon
Representing Great Britain
Olympic Games
Silver medal – second place	2012 London	Women's
World Championships
Gold medal – first place	2012 Rome	Team
Gold medal – first place	2013 Kaoshiung	Team
Gold medal – first place	2014 Warsaw	Individual
Silver medal – second place	2010 Chengdu	Team
Silver medal – second place	2014 Warsaw	Team
Silver medal – second place	2016 Moscow	Relay
Bronze medal – third place	2012 Rome	Individual
European Championships
Gold medal – first place	2013 Drzonkow	Team relay
Gold medal – first place	2013 Drzonkow	Team
Gold medal – first place	2015 Bath	Team
Bronze medal – third place	2016 Sofia	Team
World Cup
Gold medal – first place	2015 Sarasota	Individual
Bronze medal – third place	2012 Rostov	Individual
Junior World Championships
Gold medal – first place	2010 Szekesfehervar	Team
Junior European Championships
Gold medal – first place	2010 Golega	Team

Samantha Murray (born 25 September 1989) is an English modern pentathlete. She won the silver medal at the 2012 Summer Olympics, and the bronze medal at the 2012 World Championships. In 2014, she won individual gold and team silver medals at the 2014 World Championships. In 2015, Murray reached world number #1 in the Modern Pentathlon World Rankings after taking Gold at the USA World Cup followed by a 5th place at the Berlin World Championships. Murray finished in 8th Place at the 2016 Summer Olympics in Rio, Brazil.

== Early life ==
Murray was born on 25 September 1989 in Preston, Lancashire. Murray grew up in Clitheroe and attended Brookside Primary School, and then Bowland High School in Grindleton. Murray joined Clitheroe Dolphins Swimming Club at the age of 7, and began competing in local galas. It was through the swimming club that she was asked to try a local Modern Biathlon. She instantly took to running and decided to pursue running at higher level.

She started training for athletics at the age of 11, joining Hyndburn Athletics Club, and went on to win the Lancashire County Championships for Cross Country and 1500 metres in her first season as an Under 13 in 2001. She continued running for Lancashire and competed at English Schools and Inter Counties throughout her teen years. She moved to Blackburn Harriers Athletes Club in 2006, after a period of difficulty with her running career. Her hero was British middle distance runner Kelly Holmes, and she was inspired by her success at the 2004 Summer Olympics.

From birth, Murray was around horses as her grandparents have a small farm in Longton, Lancashire. She spent weekends and school holidays with the horses and competed from an early age at Longton Riding Club. She rode for the club at Riding Club events. Murray joined Ribble Valley Modern Pentathlon Team and began pistol shooting. She then was taken to a fencing club in Bolton and enjoyed the sport. By doing this she was able to compete in her first Modern Pentathlon.

It was here where she saw a poster of Steph Cook winning the Gold Medal at the 2000 Summer Olympics. Murray was inspired by the poster and knew that she wanted an Olympic Medal. She had a childhood dream of competing at the Olympics. Murray went on to become National Youth Champion in Modern Pentathlon for consecutive years. She won a host of international competitions as a Junior including the Olympic Hopes Competition.

Murray had a period of time out of sport whilst studying for her A-Levels. at CRGS sixth form.

== Career ==
She competed at the Junior World Championships and Junior European Championships in 2010, where the British team won gold in both events. Individually, she finished 8th in the World competition and 15th overall in the European event. The team of Murray, Katy Burke, Freyja Prentice and Heather Fell also competed in the 2010 World Modern Pentathlon Championships, where they placed overall in second place, winning the silver medal. Murray placed in 22nd position in the individual competition in her first senior competition.

Murray finished in sixth place at the World Cup event in Charlotte, North Carolina, in March 2012. Following that she competed in the Budapest Cup where she was victorious. Her first World Cup medal came in Rostov, Russia, in April 2012, when she won the bronze medal behind Anastasiya Prokopenko and Victoria Tereshchuk. She had been leading going into the final day, but was overtaken during the run/shoot.

Along with Mhairi Spence, she was named to the British team at the 2012 Summer Olympics as the two female modern pentathlon competitors, and won the silver medal in the last event of the games.

== Personal life ==
She is a graduate of the University of Bath where she studied Politics and French.
