= Arthur Lanigan-O'Keeffe =

Irish modern pentathlete

Personal information
- Born: 13 September 1991 (age 33); Thomastown, County Kilkenny, Ireland
- Height: 1.82 m (5 ft 11 1/2 in)
- Weight: 76 kg (168 lb)

Sport
- Country: Ireland
- Sport: Modern pentathlon
- Coached by: Steven Macklin
- Updated on 20 August 2016

Arthur Lanigan-O'Keeffe (born 13 September 1991) is an Irish athlete who competed at the 2012 Summer Olympics and 2016 Summer Olympics in the Modern pentathlon. In the 2016 Olympics he finished in 8th place running 11.12.23 for the final 3200 metre running and shooting segment. This time places him in the top 300 of Irish runners in 2016 in the 2 mile rankings.
