= Pier Paolo Petroni =

Italian modern pentathlete (born 1987)

Personal information
- Born: 30 March 1987 (age 39)

Sport
- Country: Italy
- Sport: Modern pentathlon

Pier Paolo Petroni (born 30 March 1987) is an Italian modern pentathlete. He competed at the 2016 Summer Olympics in Rio de Janeiro, in the men's event.
