= Lena Schöneborn =

German modern pentathlete

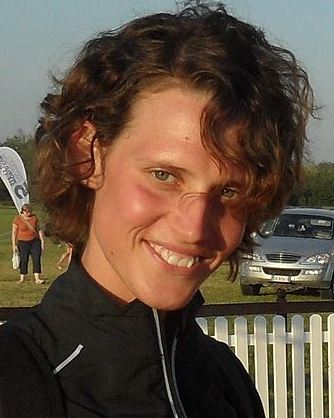

Personal information
- Born: 11 April 1986 (age 40) Troisdorf, West Germany
- Height: 1.78 m (5 ft 10 in)
- Weight: 60 kg (132 lb)

Sport
- Country: Germany
- Sport: Modern Pentathlon
- Coached by: Peter Deutsch (running, swimming); Bernd Uhlig (fencing); Gerhard Schroter (show jumping)
Medal record
Women's modern pentathlon
Representing Germany
Olympic Games
Gold medal – first place	2008 Beijing	Individual
World Championships
Gold medal – first place	2005 Warsaw	Relay
Gold medal – first place	2009 London	Team
Gold medal – first place	2011 Moscow	Team
Gold medal – first place	2012 Rome	Relay
Gold medal – first place	2015 Berlin	Individual
Gold medal – first place	2016 Moscow	Relay
Silver medal – second place	2007 Berlin	Individual
Silver medal – second place	2007 Berlin	Team
Silver medal – second place	2009 London	Relay
Silver medal – second place	2011 Moscow	Relay
Bronze medal – third place	2007 Berlin	Relay
Bronze medal – third place	2009 London	Individual
Bronze medal – third place	2010 Chengdu	Individual
Bronze medal – third place	2010 Chengdu	Team
Bronze medal – third place	2016 Moscow	Individual
Bronze medal – third place	2016 Moscow	Team
- Updated on 27 May 2016

Lena Schöneborn (born 11 April 1986 in Troisdorf, West Germany) is a German pentathlete, who won the gold medal in the Modern Pentathlon at the 2008 Summer Olympics. She is living in Berlin and besides Pentathlon she is studying marketing. She won gold at the Women's Final of the Modern Pentathlon European Championships 2011, held in Medway.
