= European Modern Pentathlon Championships =

Sporting competition

- Status: active
- Genre: sporting event
- Date: mid-year
- Frequency: annual
- Country: varying
- Inaugurated: 1987
- Founder: Union Internationale de Pentathlon Moderne

European Modern Pentathlon Championships (European Senior Modern Pentathlon Championships) is main modern pentathlon championships in Europe.

== Euro Federation ==
ECMP = 40 member federations

European Confederation of Modern Pentathlon (ECMP) = founded on 19 April 1991

== Events ==
Other European Championships in Modern Pentathlon:

1. European U24 Modern Pentathlon Championships
2. European Junior Modern Pentathlon Championships
3. European Masters Modern Pentathlon Championships
4. European Para Modern Pentathlon Championships
5. European U17 and 19 Tetrathlon Championships
6. European Tetrathlon Cup
7. Biathle and Triathle European Championships
8. European Laser Run Championships

== Senior championships ==
#	Year	City	Country	Events
1	1987	Berlin (West)	(East Berlin) Berlin (Allied-occupied) (m)	2
2	1989	Umeå; Modena	Sweden (m); Italy (f)	4
3	1991	Rome; Sofia	Italy (m); Bulgaria (f)	5
4	1993	Sofia; Győr	Bulgaria (m); Hungary (f)	5
5	1995	San Benedetto; Berlin	Italy (m); Germany (f)	6
6	1997	Székesfehérvár; Moscow	Hungary (m); Russia (f)	6
7	1998	Uppsala; Warsaw	Sweden (m); Poland (f)	6
8	1999	Drzonków; Tampere	Poland (m); Finland (f)	6
9	2000	Székesfehérvár	Hungary	6
10	2001	Sofia	Bulgaria	6
11	2002	Ústí nad Labem	Czech Republic	6
12	2003	Ústí nad Labem	Czech Republic	6
13	2004	Albena	Bulgaria	6
14	2005	Montepulciano	Italy	6
15	2006	Budapest	Hungary	6
16	2007	Riga	Latvia	6
17	2008	Moscow	Russia	6
18	2009	Leipzig	Germany	6
19	2010	Debrecen	Hungary	6
20	2011	Medway	(United Kingdom) Britain	6
21	2012	Sofia	Bulgaria	7
22	2013	Drzonków	Poland	7
23	2014	Székesfehérvár	Hungary	7
24	2015	Bath	(United Kingdom) Britain	7
25	2016	Sofia	Bulgaria	7
26	2017	Minsk	Belarus	7
27	2018	Székesfehérvár	Hungary	7
28	2019	Bath	(United Kingdom) Britain	7
29	2021	Nizhny Novgorod	Russia	7
30	2022	Székesfehérvár	Hungary	7
31	2023	Kraków	Poland	5
32	2024	Budapest	Hungary	7
33	2025	Madrid	Spain	7
34	2026	Istanbul	Turkey	7

== Medal summary (1987–2024) ==
Rank	Nation	Gold	Silver	Bronze	Total
1	Hungary	47	35	30	112
2	Russia	29	26	23	78
3	Great Britain	18	17	14	49
4	Lithuania	17	12	8	37
5	Italy	15	13	17	45
6	France	13	16	12	41
7	Czech Republic	10	8	14	32
8	Germany	9	15	9	33
9	Poland	8	16	22	46
10	Belarus	8	11	16	35
11	Ukraine	5	10	11	26
12	Soviet Union	5	1	2	8
13	Ireland	1	2	0	3
14	Estonia	1	0	0	1
15	Sweden	0	1	3	4
16	Latvia	0	1	2	3
17	Romania	0	1	1	2
18	Czechoslovakia	0	1	0	1
18	Spain	0	1	0	1
18	Switzerland	0	1	0	1
18	West Germany	0	1	0	1
22	Turkey	0	0	2	2
23	Greece	0	0	1	1
Totals (23 entries)		186	189	187	562

== See also ==
- World Modern Pentathlon Championships
- Europe Triathlon Championships
