= List of World Championships medalists in modern pentathlon =

This is a List of World Championships medalists in modern pentathlon. The World Modern Pentathlon Championships is the major modern pentathlon competition, along with the Olympic competition.

== Men ==
=== Individual ===
as of December 2024

Championships	Gold	Silver	Bronze
1949 Stockholm	Tage Bjurfeldt (SWE)	Lauri Vilkko (FIN)	Viktor Platan (FIN)
1950 Bern	Lars Hall (SWE)	Duilio Brignetti (ITA)	Lauri Vilkko (FIN)
1951 Helsingborg	Lars Hall (SWE)	Lauri Vilkko (FIN)	Torsten Lindqvist (SWE)
1953 Santo Domingo	Gábor Benedek (HUN)	István Szondy (HUN)	William Andre (USA)
1954 Budapest	Björn Thofelt (SWE)	Werner Vetterli (SUI)	István Szondy (HUN)
1955 Zurich	Konstantin Salnikov (URS)	Olavi Mannonen (FIN)	Aladár Kovácsi (HUN)
1957 Stockholm	Igor Novikov (URS)	Aleksandr Tarasov (URS)	Nikolay Tatarinov (URS)
1958 Aldershot	Igor Novikov (URS)	Kurt Lindeman (FIN)	Aleksandr Tarasov (URS)
1959 Hershey	Igor Novikov (URS)	András Balczó (HUN)	Aleksandr Tarasov (URS)
1961 Moscow	Igor Novikov (URS)	Ivan Deryugin (URS)	András Balczó (HUN)
1962 Mexico City	Eduard Sdobnikov (URS)	Igor Novikov (URS)	Ferenc Török (HUN)
1963 Magglingen	András Balczó (HUN)	Ferenc Török (HUN)	Igor Novikov (URS)
1965 Leipzig	András Balczó (HUN)	Igor Novikov (URS)	Ferenc Török (HUN)
1966 Melbourne	András Balczó (HUN)	Viktor Mineyev (URS)	Ferenc Török (HUN)
1967 Jönköping	András Balczó (HUN)	Stasis Shaparnis (URS)	Björn Ferm (SWE)
1969 Budapest	András Balczó (HUN)	Boris Onischenko (URS)	Björn Ferm (SWE)
1970 Warendorf	Péter Kelemen (HUN)	András Balczó (HUN)	Boris Onischenko (URS)
1971 San Antonio	Boris Onischenko (URS)	Zsigmond Villányi (HUN)	András Balczó (HUN)
1973 London	Pavel Lednev (URS)	Vladimir Shmelev (URS)	Boris Onischenko (URS)
1974 Moscow	Pavel Lednev (URS)	Vladimir Shmelev (URS)	Boris Onischenko (URS)
1975 Mexico City	Pavel Lednev (URS)	Tamás Kancsal (HUN)	Jim Fox (GBR)
1977 San Antonio	Janusz Pyciak-Peciak (POL)	Pavel Lednev (URS)	Slawomir Rotkiewicz (POL)
1978 Jönköping	Pavel Lednev (URS)	Janusz Pyciak-Peciak (POL)	Neil Glenesk (USA)
1979 Budapest	Bob Nieman (USA)	Janusz Pyciak-Peciak (POL)	Daniele Masala (ITA)
1981 Zielona Góra	Janusz Pyciak-Peciak (POL)	Daniele Masala (ITA)	Tamás Szombathelyi (HUN)
1982 Rome	Daniele Masala (ITA)	Anatoliy Starostin (URS)	Joël Bouzou (FRA)
1983 Warendorf	Anatoliy Starostin (URS)	Tamás Szombathelyi (HUN)	Yevgeniy Zinkovskiy (URS)
1985 Melbourne	Attila Mizsér (HUN)	Anatoliy Starostin (URS)	Igor Shvartz (URS)
1986 Montecatini Terme	Carlo Massullo (ITA)	Daniele Masala (ITA)	Lajos Dobi (HUN)
1987 Moulins	Joël Bouzou (FRA)	Milan Kadlec (TCH)	László Fábián (HUN)
1989 Budapest	László Fábián (HUN)	Attila Mizsér (HUN)	Petr Blažek (TCH)
1990 Lahti	Gianluca Tiberti (ITA)	Anatoliy Starostin (URS)	Milan Kadlec (TCH)
1991 San Antonio	Arkadiusz Skrzypaszek (POL)	Peter Steinmann (SUI)	Ádám Madaras (HUN)
1993 Darmstadt	Richard Phelps (GBR)	László Fábián (HUN)	Sébastien Deleigne (FRA)
1994 Sheffield	Dmitri Svatkovskiy (RUS)	Christophe Ruer (FRA)	János Martinek (HUN)
1995 Basel	Dmitri Svatkovskiy (RUS)	Ákos Hanzély (HUN)	Cesare Toraldo (ITA)
1997 Sofia	Sébastien Deleigne (FRA)	Dmitri Svatkovskiy (RUS)	Andrejus Zadneprovskis (LTU)
1998 Mexico City	Sébastien Deleigne (FRA)	Vakhtang Iagorashvili (USA)	Andrey Smirnov (BLR)
1999 Budapest	Gábor Balogh (HUN)	Libor Capalini (CZE)	Dmitri Svatkovskiy (RUS)
2000 Pesaro	Andrejus Zadneprovskis (LTU)	Gábor Balogh (HUN)	Nicolae Papuc (ROU)
2001 Millfield	Gábor Balogh (HUN)	Viktor Horváth (HUN)	Tzanko Hantov (BUL)
2002 San Francisco	Michal Sedlecký (CZE)	Erik Johansson (SWE)	Eric Walther (GER)
2003 Pesaro	Eric Walther (GER)	Erik Johansson (SWE)	Michal Michalík (CZE)
2004 Moscow	Andrejus Zadneprovskis (LTU)	Lee Choon-Huan (KOR)	Libor Capalini (CZE)
2005 Warsaw	Qian Zhenhua (CHN)	Aleksey Turkin (RUS)	Andrey Moiseyev (RUS)
2006 Guatemala City	Edvinas Krungolcas (LTU)	Viktor Horváth (HUN)	Andrejus Zadneprovskis (LTU)
2007 Berlin	Viktor Horváth (HUN)	Ilia Frolov (RUS)	Róbert Németh (HUN)
2008 Budapest	Ilya Frolov (RUS)	David Svoboda (CZE)	Yahor Lapo (BLR)
2009 London	Ádám Marosi (HUN)	David Svoboda (CZE)	Dmytro Kirpulyanskyy (UKR)
2010 Chengdu	Sergey Karyakin (RUS)	Aleksander Lesun (RUS)	Justinas Kinderis (LTU)
2011 Moscow	Andrey Moiseyev (RUS)	Aleksander Lesun (RUS)	Ádám Marosi (HUN)
2012 Rome	Aleksander Lesun (RUS)	Andrey Moiseyev (RUS)	Jung Jin-Hwa (KOR)
2013 Kaohsiung	Justinas Kinderis (LTU)	Nicholas Woodbridge (GBR)	Aleksander Lesun (RUS)
2014 Warsaw	Aleksander Lesun (RUS)	Amro El Geziry (EGY)	Jan Kuf (CZE)
2015 Berlin	Pavlo Tymoshchenko (UKR)	Aleksander Lesun (RUS)	Andriy Fedechko (UKR)
2016 Moscow	Valentin Belaud (FRA)	Aleksander Lesun (RUS)	Jung Jin-hwa (KOR)
2017 Cairo	Jung Jin-hwa (KOR)	Róbert Kasza (HUN)	Justinas Kinderis (LTU)
2018 Mexico City	James Cooke (GBR)	Valentin Prades (FRA)	Pavlo Tymoshchenko (UKR)
2019 Budapest	Valentin Belaud (FRA)	Joe Choong (GBR)	Jun Woong-tae (KOR)
2021 Cairo	Ádám Marosi (HUN)	Alexander Lifanov (RMPF)	Ahmed Elgendy (EGY)
2022 Alexandria	Joseph Choong (GBR)	Mohamed Elgendy (EGY)	Balazs Szep (HUN)
2023 Bath	Joseph Choong (GBR)	Emiliano Hernández (MEX)	Mohanad Shaban (EGY)
2024 Zhengzhou	Csaba Bőhm (HUN)	Balázs Szép (HUN)	Jun Woong-tae (KOR)
2025 Kaunas	Moutaz Mohamed (EGY)	Mathis Rochat (FRA)	Matej Lukes (CZE)

=== Team ===
as of December 2024

Championships	Gold	Silver	Bronze
1949 Stockholm	Sweden	Finland	Switzerland
1950 Bern	Sweden	Finland	Italy
1951 Helsingborg	Sweden	Finland	Brazil
1953 Santo Domingo	Sweden	Argentina	Chile
1954 Budapest	Hungary	Switzerland	Sweden
1955 Zurich	Hungary	Soviet Union	Switzerland
1957 Stockholm	Soviet Union	Finland	Hungary
1958 Aldershot	Soviet Union	Hungary	Finland
1959 Hershey	Soviet Union	Finland	United States
1961 Moscow	Soviet Union	Hungary	United States
1962 Mexico City	Soviet Union	Hungary	United States
1963 Magglingen	Hungary	Soviet Union	United States
1965 Leipzig	Hungary	Soviet Union	East Germany
1966 Melbourne	Hungary	Soviet Union	East Germany
1967 Jönköping	Hungary	Sweden	Soviet Union
1969 Budapest	Soviet Union	Hungary	West Germany
1970 Warendorf	Hungary	Soviet Union	West Germany
1971 San Antonio	Soviet Union	Hungary	United States
1973 London	Soviet Union	West Germany	Hungary
1974 Moscow	Soviet Union	Hungary	Romania
1975 Mexico City	Hungary	United States	Soviet Union
1977 San Antonio	Poland	Soviet Union	Hungary
1978 Jönköping	Poland	West Germany	Soviet Union
1979 Budapest	United States	Hungary	Soviet Union
1981 Zielona Góra	Poland	Hungary	Italy
1982 Rome	Soviet Union	Hungary	Italy
1983 Warendorf	Soviet Union	Hungary	France
1985 Melbourne	Soviet Union	Hungary	Italy
1986 Montecatini Terme	Italy	Hungary	France
1987 Moulins	Hungary	Soviet Union	Great Britain
1989 Budapest	Hungary	Soviet Union	Czechoslovakia
1990 Lahti	Soviet Union	Italy	Poland
1991 San Antonio	CIS	Poland	Hungary
1994 Sheffield	France	Great Britain	Belarus
1995 Basel	Hungary	Italy	Poland
1997 Sofia	Hungary	Belarus	Russia
1998 Mexico City	Mexico	Hungary	France
1999 Budapest	Hungary	Lithuania	Belarus
2000 Pesaro	United States	Poland	Sweden
2001 Millfield	Hungary	Lithuania	Russia
2002 San Francisco	Hungary	Czech Republic	Lithuania
2003 Pesaro	Hungary	Germany	Czech Republic
2004 Moscow	Russia; Rustem Sabirkhuzin; Aleksey Lebedinets; Andrey Moiseyev	Czech Republic; Libor Capalini; Michal Michalik; Michal Sedlecky	Italy; Stefano Pecci; Andrea Valentini; Enrico dell'Amore
2005 Warsaw	Russia; Rustem Sabirkhuzin; Aleksey Lebedinets; Andrey Moiseyev	Czech Republic; Libor Capalini; Michal Michalík; Michal Sedlecký	Germany; Sebastian Dietz; Steffen Gebhardt; Eric Walther
2006 Guatemala City	Lithuania; Tadas Zemaitis; Edvinas Krungolcas; Andrejus Zadneprovskis	Hungary; Viktor Horváth; Sándor Fülep; Ákos Kállai	Czech Republic; Libor Capalini; Michal Michalik; Michal Sedlecký
2007 Berlin	Germany; Steffen Gebhardt; Eric Walther; Sebastian Dietz	Czech Republic; David Svoboda; Michal Michalík; Libor Capalini	Hungary; Viktor Horváth; Sándor Fülep; Gábor Balogh
2008 Budapest	Russia; Ilya Frolov; Andrey Moiseyev; Aleksey Turkin	Ukraine; Dmytro Kirpulyanskyy; Pavlo Tymoshchenko; Yevgeniy Borkin	Belarus; Yahor Lapo; Mikhail Prokopenko; Dzmitry Meliakh
2009 London	Hungary; Ádám Marosi; Róbert Németh; Péter Tibolya	Czech Republic; David Svoboda; Michal Michalík; Ondřej Polívka	Lithuania; Justinas Kinderis; Edvinas Krungolcas; Andrejus Zadneprovskis
2010 Chengdu	Lithuania; Justinas Kinderis; Edvinas Krungolcas; Tomas Makarovas	Czech Republic; Ondřej Polívka; Michal Sedlecky; David Svoboda	Hungary; Ádám Marosi; Róbert Kasza; Róbert Németh
2011 Moscow	Russia; Ilia Frolov; Sergey Karyakin; Aleksander Lesun	Hungary; Bence Demeter; Róbert Kasza; Ádám Marosi	Italy; Nicola Benedetti; Riccardo De Luca; Auro Franceschini
2012 Rome	Italy; Nicola Benedetti; Riccardo De Luca; Pierpaolo Petroni	Russia; Ilia Frolov; Sergey Karyakin; Aleksander Lesun	South Korea; Hong Jin-Woo; Hwang Woo-Jin; Jung Jin-Hwa
2013 Kaohsiung	France; Jean Maxence Berrou; Christopher Patte; Valentin Prades	Russia; Ilia Frolov; Sergey Karyakin; Aleksander Lesun	South Korea; Jung Jin-Hwa; Jung Hwon-Ho; Lee Woo-Jin
2014 Warsaw	Hungary; Róbert Kasza; Bence Demeter; Ádám Marosi	France; Valentin Belaud; Valentin Prades; Christopher Patte	China; Haihang Su; Jianli Guo; Jiahao Han
2015 Berlin	South Korea; Lee Woo-jin; Jun Woong-tae; Jung Jin-hwa	Russia; Maksim Kustov; Aleksander Lesun; Ilia Frolov	Poland; Michal Gralewski; Jaroslaw Swiderski; Sebastian Stasiak
2016 Moscow	Egypt; Amro El Geziry; Yasser Hefny; Omar El Geziry	Russia; Egor Puchkarevskiy; Aleksander Lesun; Maksim Kutsov	France; Valentin Prades; Valentin Belaud; Christopher Patte
2017 Cairo	Egypt; Ahmed Hamed; Yasser Hefny; Eslam Hamad; Sherif Rashad	Belarus; Ilya Palazkov; Pavel Tsikhanau; Kirill Kasyanik; Aliaksandr Poupe	Russia; Ilia Frolov; Kirill Belyakov; Aleksander Lesun; Alexander Savkin
2018 Mexico City	France; Valentin Prades; Valentin Belaud; Brice Loubet	Great Britain; James Cooke; Myles Pillage; Joe Choong	Ukraine; Pavlo Tymoshchenko; Denys Pavlyuk; Yuriy Fedechko
2019 Budapest	South Korea; Jun Woong-tae; Lee Ji-hun; Jung Jin-hwa	Hungary; Robert Kasza; Adam Marosi; Bence Demeter	Great Britain; Joe Choong; James Cooke; Thomas Toolis
2021 Cairo	Hungary; Ádám Marosi; Richárd Bereczki; Bence Demeter	Germany; Fabian Liebig; Marvin Faly Dogue; Patrick Dogue	Egypt; Eslam Hamad; Ahmed Hamed; Ahmed Elgendy
2022 Alexandria	France; Christopher Patte; Valentin Prades; Valentin Belaud	Hungary; Balazs Szep; Bence Demeter; Csaba Bohm	Germany; Marvin Dogue; Pele Huibel; Patrick Dogue
2023 Bath	Egypt; Ahmed El-Gendy; Mohamed El-Gendy; Mohanad Shaban	Great Britain; Charles Brown; Joseph Choong; Myles Pillage	South Korea; Jun Woong-tae; Jung Jin-hwa; Lee Ji-hun
2024 Zhonzhou	Hungary; Csaba Bőhm; Bence Demeter; Balázs Szép	South Korea; Jun Woong-tae; Kim Soeng-jin; Seo Chang-wan	Czech Republic; Marek Grycz; Matěj Lukeš; Martin Vlach

=== Relay ===
Championships	Gold	Silver	Bronze
1989 Budapest	Hungary	West Germany	Soviet Union
1990 Lahti	Soviet Union	Hungary	Italy
1991 San Antonio	Hungary	Poland	Germany
1992 Winterthur	Poland	Italy	Sweden
1993 Darmstadt	Hungary	France	Italy
1994 Sheffield	Hungary	Poland	Russia
1995 Basel	Poland	Switzerland	Mexico
1997 Sofia	United States	Mexico	Poland
1998 Mexico City	Germany	Lithuania	France
1999 Budapest	Hungary	Russia	United States
2000 Pesaro	United States	Hungary	Russia
2001 Millfield	Hungary	Sweden	Poland
2002 San Francisco	Germany	Lithuania	Poland
2003 Pesaro	Hungary	Russia	Belarus
2004 Moscow	Russia; Aleksey Turkin; Andrey Moiseyev; Dmitriy Galkin	United States; Scott Christie; Chad Senior; Vahktang Iagorashvili	South Korea; Han Do-Ryung; Lee Choon-Huan; Kim In-Hong
2005 Warsaw	Hungary; Ákos Kállai; Sándor Fülep; Viktor Horváth	Russia; Aleksey Turkin; Rustem Sabirkhuzin; Pavel Sazonov	Czech Republic; Libor Capalini; Michal Michalík; David Svoboda
2006 Guatemala City	Hungary; Viktor Horváth; Sándor Fülep; Ákos Kállai	Belarus; Igor Lapo; Mikhail Prokopenko; Dmitriy Meliakh	China; Cao Zhongrong; Qian Zhenhua; Liu Yanli
2007 Berlin	Germany; Steffen Gebhardt; Eric Walther; Sebastian Dietz	China; Cao Zhongrong; Qian Zhenhua; Xu Yunqi	Czech Republic; David Svoboda; Michal Michalík; Ondřej Polívka
2008 Budapest	Belarus; Yahor Lapo; Mikhail Prokopenko; Dzmitry Meliakh	Lithuania; Justinas Kinderis; Edvinas Krungolcas; Andrejus Zadneprovskis	Hungary; Ádám Marosi; Róbert Németh; Péter Tibolya
2009 London	Czech Republic; David Svoboda; Ondřej Polívka	Russia; Semen Burtsev; Sergey Karyakin	Egypt; Amro el-Geziry; Omar el-Geziry
2010 Chengdu	Belarus; Mihail Prokopenko; Mikhail Mitsyk; Dzmitry Meliakh	South Korea; Jung Hwon-ho; Nam Dong-hun; Kim Soeng-jin	Russia; Andrei Moiseev; Ilia Frolov; Aleksander Lesun
2011 Moscow	Hungary; Róbert Kasza; Ádám Marosi; Péter Tibolya	South Korea; Hong Jin-Woo; Hwang Woo-Jin; Lee Choon-Huan	Ukraine; Pavlo Kirpulyanskyy; Oleksandr Mordasov; Pavlo Tymoshchenko
2012 Rome	South Korea; Hong Jin-Woo; Hwang Woo-Jin; Jung Jin-Hwa	Germany; Delf Borrmann; Stefan Kollner; Alexander Nobis	Russia; Maksim Kustov; Alexander Savkin; Ilya Shugarov
2013 Kaohsiung	Hungary; Bence Demeter; Róbert Kasza; Ádám Marosi	China; Cai Zhaohong; Chen Fulao; Guo Jianli	Russia; Ilia Frolov; Aleksander Lesun; Dmitry Lukach
2014 Warsaw	France; Valentin Belaud; Valentin Prades	Belarus; Stanislau Zhurauliou; Raman Pinchuk	South Korea; Woo Jin Lee; Woojin Hwang
2015 Berlin	Germany; Marvin Faly Dogue; Alexander Nobis	Russia; Alexander Kukarin; Kirill Belyakov	Poland; Szymon Staskiewicz; Jaroslaw Swiderski
2016 Moscow	South Korea; Hwang Woo-jin; Jun Woongtae	Russia; Ilia Frolov	France; Alexandre Henrard; Pierre Dejardin
2017 Cairo	South Korea; Hwang Woo-jin; Jun Woong-tae	Germany; Christian Zillekens; Alexander Nobis	Belarus; Ilya Palazkov; Pavel Tsikhanau
2018 Mexico City	France; Alexandre Henrard; Valentin Belaud	Czech Republic; Jan Kuf; Martin Vlach	Bulgaria; Todor Mihalev; Yavor Peshleevski
2019 Budapest	Germany; Alexander Nobis; Patrick Dogue	South Korea; Jung Jin-hwa; Jun Woong-tae	Russia; Aleksander Lesun; Danil Kalimullin
2021 Cairo	RMPF; Alexander Lifanov; Maxim Kuznetsov	South Korea; Jung Jin-hwa; Jun Woong-tae	China; Han Jiahao; Zhang Linbin
2022 Alexandria	South Korea; Jung Jin-hwa; Jun Woong-tae	Egypt; Eslam Hamad; Ahmed Hamed	Czech Republic; Matous Tuma; Filip Houska
2023 Bath	Egypt; Ahmed Hamed; Moutaz Mohamed	Hungary; Gergely Regős; Balázs Szép	South Korea; Lee Ji-hun; Seo Chang-wan
2024 Zhongzhou	South Korea; Jun Woong-tae; Seo Chang-wan	Ukraine; Maksym Aharushev; Oleksandr Tovkai	France; Léo Bories; Ugo Fleurot
2025 Alexandria	France; Léo Bories; Mathis Rochat	Czech Republic; Marek Grycz; Matěj Lukeš	Egypt; Moutaz Mohamed; Omar Wael

== Women ==
=== Individual ===
Championships	Gold	Silver	Bronze
1978 Jönköping	Wendy Norman (GBR)	Wendy Skipworth (GBR)	Nancy Absolon (CAN)
1981 London	Anne Ahlgren (SWE)	Sabine Krapf (FRG)	Wendy Norman (GBR)
1982 Compiègne	Wendy Norman (GBR)	Sarah Parker (GBR)	Kathy Tayler (GBR)
1983 Gothenburg	Lynn Chronobrywy (CAN)	Anne Ahlgren (SWE)	Sarah Parker (GBR)
1984 Copenhagen	Svetlana Yakovleva (URS)	Pernille Svarre (DEN)	Sabine Krapf (FRG)
1985 Montreal	Barbara Kotowska (POL)	Irina Kiseleva (URS)	Anna Bajan (POL)
1986 Montecatini Terme	Irina Kiseleva (URS)	Sophie Moressée (FRA)	Sabine Krapf (FRG)
1987 Bensheim	Irina Kiseleva (URS)	Barbara Kotowska (POL)	Sabine Krapf (FRG)
1988 Warsaw	Dorota Idzi (POL)	Irina Kiseleva (URS)	Caroline Delemer (FRA)
1989 Wiener Neustadt	Lori Norwood (USA)	Irén Kovács (HUN)	Caroline Delemer (FRA)
1990 Linköping	Eva Fjellerup (DEN)	Lori Norwood (USA)	Dorota Idzi (POL)
1991 Sydney	Eva Fjellerup (DEN)	Caroline Delemer (FRA)	Cristina Minelli (ITA)
1992 Budapest	Iwona Kowalewska (POL)	Yana Dolgacheva (BLR)	Dorota Idzi (POL)
1993 Darmstadt	Eva Fjellerup (DEN)	Iwona Kowalewska (POL)	Dorota Idzi (POL)
1994 Sheffield	Eva Fjellerup (DEN)	Yana Shubenok (BLR)	Emese Köblõ (HUN)
1995 Basel	Kerstin Danielsson (SWE)	Yana Shubenok (BLR)	Dorota Idzi (POL)
1996 Siena	Yana Shubenok (BLR)	Dorota Idzi (POL)	Yelizaveta Suvorova (RUS)
1997 Sofia	Yelizaveta Suvorova (RUS)	Fabiana Fares (ITA)	Lucie Grolichová (CZE)
1998 Mexico City	Anna Sulima (POL)	Zsuzsanna Vörös (HUN)	Paulina Boenisz (POL)
1999 Budapest	Zsuzsanna Vörös (HUN)	Yelizaveta Suvorova (RUS)	Kim Raisner (GER)
2000 Pesaro	Pernille Svarre (DEN)	Paulina Boenisz (POL)	Jelena Rublevska (LAT)
2001 Millfield	Stephanie Cook (GBR)	Paulina Boenisz (POL)	Georgina Harland (GBR)
2002 San Francisco	Bea Simóka (HUN)	Zsuzsanna Vörös (HUN)	Georgina Harland (GBR)
2003 Pesaro	Zsuzsanna Vörös (HUN)	Olesya Velichko (RUS)	Kate Allenby (GBR)
2004 Moscow	Zsuzsanna Vörös (HUN)	Kate Allenby (GBR)	Tatsiana Mazurkevich (BLR)
2005 Warsaw	Claudia Corsini (ITA)	Zsuzsanna Vörös (HUN)	Jelena Rublevska (LAT)
2006 Guatemala City	Marta Dziadura (POL)	Victoria Tereshchuk (UKR)	Omnia Fakhry (EGY)
2007 Berlin	Amélie Cazé (FRA)	Lena Schöneborn (GER)	Laura Asadauskaitė (LTU)
2008 Budapest	Amélie Cazé (FRA)	Aya Medany (EGY)	Katie Livingston (GBR)
2009 London	Chen Qian (CHN)	Laura Asadauskaitė (LTU)	Lena Schöneborn (GER)
2010 Chengdu	Amélie Cazé (FRA)	Donata Rimšaitė (LTU)	Lena Schöneborn (GER)
2011 Moscow	Victoria Tereshchuk (UKR)	Sarolta Kovács (HUN)	Laura Asadauskaitė (LTU)
2012 Rome	Mhairi Spence (GBR)	Chen Qian (CHN)	Samantha Murray (GBR)
2013 Kaohsiung	Laura Asadauskaitė (LTU)	Yane Marques (BRA)	Donata Rimšaitė (RUS)
2014 Warsaw	Samantha Murray (GBR)	Chen Qian (CHN)	Liang Wanxia (CHN)
2015 Berlin	Lena Schöneborn (GER)	Chen Qian (CHN)	Yane Marques (BRA)
2016 Moscow	Sarolta Kovács (HUN)	Élodie Clouvel (FRA)	Lena Schöneborn (GER)
2017 Cairo	Gulnaz Gubaydullina (RUS)	Zsófia Földházi (HUN)	Anastasiya Prokopenko (BLR)
2018 Mexico City	Anastasiya Prokopenko (BLR)	Annika Schleu (GER)	Marie Oteiza (FRA)
2019 Budapest	Volha Silkina (BLR)	Elena Micheli (ITA)	Kate French (GBR)
2021 Cairo	Anastasiya Prokopenko (BLR)	Élodie Clouvel (FRA)	Michelle Gulyás (HUN)
2022 Alexandria	Elena Micheli (ITA)	Michelle Gulyás (HUN)	İlke Özyüksel (TUR)
2023 Bath	Elena Micheli (ITA)	Alice Sotero (ITA)	Kerenza Bryson (GBR)
2024 Zhongzhou	Seong Seung-min (KOR)	Blanka Guzi (HUN)	Rita Erdős (HUN)
2025 Kaunas	Farida Khalil (EGY)	Blanka Guzi (HUN)	Aurora Tognetti (ITA)

=== Team ===
Championships	Gold	Silver	Bronze
1981 London	Great Britain	United States	Sweden
1982 Compiègne	Great Britain	West Germany	Sweden
1983 Gothenburg	Great Britain	West Germany	Sweden
1984 Copenhagen	Soviet Union	Poland	West Germany
1985 Montreal	Poland	Soviet Union	Sweden
1986 Montecatini Terme	Soviet Union	West Germany	Italy
1987 Bensheim	Soviet Union	West Germany	Poland
1988 Warsaw	Poland	Italy	France
1989 Wiener Neustadt	Poland	United States	Italy
1990 Linköping	Poland	Soviet Union	West Germany
1991 Sydney	Poland	Italy	France
1992 Budapest	Poland	Hungary	Germany
1993 Darmstadt	not held		
1994 Sheffield	Italy	Poland	Hungary
1995 Basel	Poland	Hungary	Denmark
1996 Siena	Russia	Germany	Poland
1997 Sofia	Italy	Russia	Czech Republic
1998 Mexico City	Poland	Great Britain	Hungary
1999 Budapest	Russia	Great Britain	Italy
2000 Pesaro	Poland	Great Britain	Italy
2001 Millfield	Great Britain	Poland	Russia
2002 San Francisco	Hungary	Italy	Russia
2003 Pesaro	Great Britain	Russia	Hungary
2004 Moscow	Great Britain; Kate Allenby; Georgina Harland; Joanna Clark	Belarus; Galina Bachlakova; Anastasiya Samusevich; Tatsiana Mazurkevich	Russia; Olessiya Velichko; Tatyana Muratova; Marina Kolonina
2005 Warsaw	Russia; Lyudmila Sirotkina; Tatyana Muratova; Yevdokiya Gretchichnikova	Hungary; Zsuzsanna Vörös; Adrienn Szatmári; Csilla Füri	Poland; Edita Maloszyc; Paulina Boenisz; Sylwia Czwojdzinska
2006 Guatemala City	Poland; Sylvia Czwojdzinska; Paulina Boenisz; Marta Dziadura	Great Britain; Georgina Harland; Mhairi Spence; Katie Livingston	Hungary; Zsuzsanna Vörös; Csilla Füri; Vivien Máthé
2007 Berlin	Belarus; Tatsiana Mazurkevich; Anastasiya Samusevich; Hanna Arkhipenka	Germany; Lena Schoneborn; Eva Trautmann; Claudia Knack	Russia; Liudmila Sirotkina; Tatiana Mouratova; Evdokia Gretchichnikova
2008 Budapest	Poland; Sylwia Czwojdzińska; Paulina Boenisz; Edita Maloszyc	Great Britain; Heather Fell; Mhairi Spence; Katie Livingston	Hungary; Sarolta Kovács; Adrienn Tóth; Leila Gyenesei
2009 London	Germany; Lena Schoneborn; Eva Trautmann; Claudia Knack	Great Britain; Heather Fell; Mhairi Spence; Freyja Prentice	Hungary; Sarolta Kovács; Krisztina Cseh; Leila Gyenesei
2010 Chengdu	France; Amélie Cazé; Elfie Arnaud; Anais Eudes	Great Britain; Heather Fell; Samantha Murray; Freyja Prentice	Germany; Lena Schöneborn; Annika Schleu; Eva Trautmann
2011 Moscow	Germany; Annika Schleu; Lena Schöneborn; Eva Trautmann	Hungary; Leila Gyenesei; Sarolta Kovács; Adrienn Tóth	Russia; Evdokia Gretchichnikova; Ekaterina Khuraskina; Yuliya Kolegova
2012 Rome	Great Britain; Heather Fell; Samantha Murray; Mhairi Spence	Hungary; Leila Gyenesei; Sarolta Kovács; Adrienn Tóth	China; Chen Qian; Miao Yihua; Zhang Ye
2013 Kaohsiung	Great Britain; Kate French; Samantha Murray; Mhairi Spence	China; Chen Qian; Liang Wanxia; Zhang Xiaonan	Ukraine; Ganna Buriak; Anastasiya Spas; Victoria Tereshuk
2014 Warsaw	China; Qian Chen; Wanxia Liang; Wei Wang	Great Britain; Freyja Prentice; Samantha Murray; Kate French	Belarus; Tatsiana Yelizarova; Anastasiya Prokopenko; Katsiaryna Arol
2015 Berlin	Poland; Anna Maliszewska; Aleksandra Skarzynska; Oktawia Nowacka	Germany; Annika Schleu; Lena Schöneborn; Janine Kohlmann	Hungary; Sarolta Kovács; Zsófia Földházi; Tamara Alekszejev
2016 Moscow	Hungary; Tamara Alekszejev; Zsófia Földházi; Sarolta Kovács	China; Zhang Xiaonan; Liang Wanxia; Chen Qian	Germany; Janine Kohlmann; Annika Schleu; Lena Schöneborn
2017 Cairo	Germany; Alexandra Bettinellil; Ronja Steinborn; Lena Schöneborn; Annika Schleu	Russia; Uliana Batashova; Anna Buriak; Ekaterina Khuraskina; Gulnaz Gubaydullina	Italy; Alice Sotero; Francesca Tognetti; Gloria Tocchi; Alessandra Frezza
2018 Mexico City	Hungary; Sarolta Kovács; Zsófia Földházi; Tamara Alekszejev	France; Marie Oteiza; Julie Belhamri; Élodie Clouvel	Germany; Annika Schleu; Janine Kohlmann; Anna Matthes
2019 Budapest	Belarus; Volha Silkina; Anastasiya Prokopenko; Iryna Prasiantsova	Great Britain; Kate French; Joanna Muir; Francesca Summers	Germany; Rebecca Langrehr; Janine Kohlmann; Annika Schleu
2021 Cairo	Germany; Annika Schleu; Rebecca Langrehr; Janine Kohlmann	Hungary; Blanka Guzi; Tamara Alekszejev; Michelle Gulyás	Belarus; Anastasiya Prokopenko; Iryna Prasiantsova; Volha Silkina
2022 Alexandria	Great Britain; Charlie Follett; Olivia Green; Jessica Varley	South Korea; Kim Sun-woo; Seong Seung-min; Jang Hae-un	Hungary; Michelle Gulyas; Sarolta Simon; Blanka Guzi
2023 Bath	Italy; Alessandra Frezza; Elena Micheli; Alice Sotero	Great Britain; Kerenza Bryson; Olivia Green; Jessica Varley	Hungary; Luca Barta; Blanka Bauer; Michelle Gulyás
2024 Zhongzhou	Hungary; Blanka Bauer; Rita Erdős; Blanka Guzi	South Korea; Jang Ha-eun; Kim Sun-woo; Seong Seung-min	Mexico; Mariana Arceo; Catherine Oliver; Tamara Vega

=== Relay ===
Championships	Gold	Silver	Bronze
1991 Sydney	Poland	Italy	Sweden
1992 Budapest	Poland	France	Hungary
1993 Darmstadt	Russia	Italy	Hungary
1994 Sheffield	Poland	Hungary	Denmark
1995 Basel	Poland	Italy	Denmark
1996 Siena	Poland	Italy	Germany
1997 Sofia	Italy	Poland	Great Britain
1998 Mexico City	Poland	Germany	Great Britain
1999 Budapest	Great Britain	Italy	Belarus
2000 Pesaro	Hungary	Great Britain	Belarus
2001 Millfield	Great Britain	Russia	Czech Republic
2002 San Francisco	Czech Republic	Italy	Hungary
2003 Pesaro	Hungary	Russia	Czech Republic
2004 Moscow	Poland; Paulina Boenisz; Marta Dziadura; Magdalena Sedziak	Belarus; Hanna Arkhipenka; Anastasiya Samusevich; Tatsiana Mazurkevich	France; Amélie Caze; Axelle Guiguet; Blandine Lacheze
2005 Warsaw	Germany; Lena Schoneborn; Elena Reiche; Kim RaisneR	Russia; Lyudmila Sirotkina; Tatyana Muratova; Olessiya Velitchko	Italy; Claudia Corsini; Sara Bertoli; Alessia Pieretti
2006 Guatemala City	Poland; Sylvia Czwojdzinska; Paulina Boenisz; Marta Dziadura	Great Britain; Georgina Harland; Mhairi Spence; Katie Livingston	Russia; Lyudmila Sirotkina; Tatyana Muratova; Polina Struchkova
2007 Berlin	Great Britain; Lindsey Weedon; Mhairi Spence; Katie Livingston	Poland; Sylwia Czwojdzińska; Paulina Boenisz; Marta Dziadura	Germany; Lena Schoneborn; Eva Trautmann; Janine Kohlmann
2008 Budapest	Hungary; Sarolta Kovács; Adrienn Tóth; Leila Gyenesei	Great Britain; Heather Fell; Mhairi Spence; Katie Livingston	Poland; Sylwia Czwojdzińska; Paulina Boenisz; Edita Maloszyc
2009 London	Czech Republic; Lucia Grolichová; Natalie Dianová	Germany; Lena Schoneborn; Eva Trautmann	Poland; Sylwia Czwojdzińska; Paulina Boenisz
2010 Chengdu	Russia; Polina Struchtkova; Evdokia Gretchichnikova; Ekaterina Khuraskina	France; Amélie Cazé; Elfie Arnaud; Elodie Cluval	China; Qian Chen; Miao Yihua; Ye Zhang
2011 Moscow	Hungary; Leila Gyenesei; Sarolta Kovács; Adrienn Tóth	Germany; Annika Schleu; Lena Schöneborn; Eva Trautmann	Ukraine; Ganna Buriak; Nataliia Levchenko; Victoria Tereshchuk
2012 Rome	Germany; Janine Kohlmann; Annika Schleu; Lena Schöneborn	China; Qian Chen; Miao Yihua; Zhu Wenjing	Great Britain; Katy Burke; Kate French; Katy Livingston
2013 Kaohsiung	Ukraine; Ganna Buriak; Iryna Khokhlova; Victoria Tereshuk	Hungary; Zsófia Földházi; Leila Gyenesei; Sarolta Kovács	Russia; Alise Fakhrutdinova; Liudmila Kukushkina; Donata Rimsaite
2014 Warsaw	China; Qian Chen; Wanxia Liang	Belarus; Anastasiya Prokopenko; Katsiaryna Arol	Italy; Camilla Lontano; Lavinia Bonessio
2015 Berlin	China; Chen Qian; Liang Wanxia	Lithuania; Lina Batuleviciute; Ieva Serapinaite	Poland; Aleksandra Skarzynska; Oktawia Nowacka
2016 Moscow	Germany; Annika Schleu; Lena Schöneborn	Great Britain; Joanna Muir; Samantha Murray	Belarus; Katsiaryna Arol; Iryna Prasiantsova
2017 Cairo	Germany; Annika Schleu; Lena Schöneborn	Egypt; Mariam Amer; Sondos Aboubakar	Japan; Shino Yamanaka; Rena Shimazu
2018 Mexico City	Belarus; Anastasiya Prokopenko; Iryna Prasiantsova	Germany; Ronja Steinborn; Annika Schleu	Guatemala; Sofia Cabrera; Sophia Hernández
2019 Budapest	Mexico; Mayan Oliver; Mariana Arceo	Hungary; Luca Barta; Kamilla Reti	South Korea; Kim Unju; Jeong Mina
2021 Cairo	Belarus; Iryna Prasiantsova; Volha Silkina	RMPF; Gulnaz Gubaydullina; Uliana Batashova	Hungary; Rita Erdős; Sarolta Simon
2022 Alexandria	Egypt; Haydy Morsy; Amira Kandil	Mexico; Mariana Arceo; Mayan Oliver	South Korea; Kim Se-hee; Kim Soon-woo
2023 Bath	Egypt; Malak Ismail; Amira Kandil	Italy; Beatrice Mercuri; Aurora Tognetti	Mexico; Mariana Arceo; Mayan Oliver
2024 Zhongzhou	South Korea; Kim Sun-woo; Seong Seung-min	Egypt; Amira Kandil; Haydy Morsy	Guatemala; Sofía Cabrera; Sophia Hernández
2025 Alexandria	Egypt; Malak Ismail; Farida Khalil	Hungary; Kinga Dulai; Blanka Guzi	Poland; Małgorzata Karbownik; Adrianna Kapała

== Mixed ==
=== Relay ===
Championships	Gold	Silver	Bronze
2010 Chengdu	Poland; Sylvia Czwojdzinska; Remigiusz Golis	Ukraine; Victoria Tereshchuk; Pavlo Tymoshchenko	Lithuania; Donata Rimšaitė; Justinas Kinderis
2011 Moscow	Ukraine; Victoria Tereshchuk; Pavlo Kirpulyanskyy	Russia; Evdokia Gretchichnikova; Sergey Karyakin	Lithuania; Laura Asadauskaitė; Justinas Kinderis
2012 Rome	Ukraine; Ganna Buriak; Oleksandr Mordasov	Russia; Svetlana Lebedeva; Maxim Kuznetsov	China; Zhang Ye; Cao Zhongrong
2013 Kaohsiung	France; Elodie Clouvel; Valentin Belaud	Latvia; Elena Rublevska; Deniss Cerkovskis	Ukraine; Iryna Khokhlova; Pavlo Tymoshchenko
2014 Warsaw	Lithuania; Justinas Kinderis; Laura Asadauskaitė	Great Britain; Joseph Evans; Kate French	Poland; Szymon Staskiewicz; Oktawia Nowacka
2015 Berlin	Czech Republic; Jan Kuf; Natalie Dianova	Russia; Anna Burjak; Maksim Kustov	United States; Nathan Schrimsher; Margaux Isaksen
2016 Moscow	Russia; Aleksander Lesun; Donata Rimšaitė	China; Han Jiahao; Zhang Xiaonan	Belarus; Ilya Palazkov; Anastasiya Prokopenko
2017 Cairo	Germany; Ronja Steinborn; Alexander Nobis	Egypt; Haydy Morsy; Eslam Hamad	France; Valentin Belaud; Julie Belhamri
2018 Mexico City	Germany; Rebecca Langrehr; Fabian Liebig	Hungary; Michelle Gulyás; Gergő Bruckmann	France; Emma Riff; Alexandre Henrard
2019 Budapest	Egypt; Eslam Hamad; Salma Abdelmaksoud	France; Valentin Belaud; Elodie Clouvel	Belarus; Ilya Palazkov; Anastasiya Prokopenko
2021 Cairo	South Korea; Seo Chang-wan; Kim Se-hee	Belarus; Ilya Palazkov; Anastasiya Prokopenko	Germany; Patrick Dogue; Rebecca Langrehr
2022 Alexandria	South Korea; Kim Soon-woo; Jun Woong-tae	Great Britain; Joseph Choong; Jessica Varley	Turkey; Bugra Unal; İlke Özyüksel
2023 Bath	Egypt; Mohanad Shaban; Salma Abdelmaksoud	South Korea; Jun Woong-tae; Kim Sun-woo	Czech Republic; Marek Grycz; Lucie Hlaváčková
2024 Zhongzhou	South Korea; Seo Chang-wan; Kim Sun-woo	Egypt; Mohamed El-Gendy; Malak Ismail	Lithuania; Titas Puronas; Elzbieta Adomaitytė
2025 Alexandria	Egypt; Farida Khalil; Mohanad Shaban	France; Mathilde Derval; Léo Bories	South Korea; Seo Chang-wan; Seong Seung-min

== See also ==
- Union Internationale de Pentathlon Moderne (UIPM)
- Modern pentathlon at the Summer Olympics
- List of Olympic medalists in modern pentathlon
