= 2010 in modern pentathlon =

This article lists the main modern pentathlon events and their results for 2010.

== Youth Olympic Games ==
- August 14 – 26: Modern pentathlon at the 2010 Summer Youth Olympics
  - Youth Individual winners: (South Korea) Kim Dae-beom (m) / (Cuba) Leydi Moya (f)
  - Youth Mixed Team Relay winners: (Russia) Ilya Shugarov & (Ukraine) Anastasiya Spas

== Other multi-sport events (Modern Pentathlon) ==
- July 6: 2010 World Military Modern Pentathlon Championships (stand alone event) in (Czech Republic) Prague
  - Individual winners: (Czech Republic) David Svoboda (m) / (Latvia) Jeļena Rubļevska (f)
- July 27 – 31: 2010 Central American and Caribbean Games in (Puerto Rico) Mayagüez
  - Men's Individual winner: (Mexico) Óscar Soto
  - Team winners: Guatemala
- November 12 – 27: 2010 Asian Games in (China) Guangzhou
  - Individual winners: (China) Cao Zhongrong (m) / (China) Miao Yihua (f)

== World modern pentathlon events ==
- June 9 – 13: 2010 World Youth "A" Modern Pentathlon Championships in (Sweden) Uppsala
  - Youth Individual winners: (China) HAN Jiahao (m) / (Hungary) Zsófia Földházi (f)
  - Youth Men's Team Relay winners: South Korea (PARK Sang-gu, Kim Dae-beom, & LEE Woo-jin)
  - Youth Women's Team Relay winners: China (WANG Wei, ZHU Wenjing, & HUO Qi)
  - Youth Mixed Team Relay winners: Lithuania (Gintarė Venčkauskaitė & Lukas Kontrimavicius)
- August 5 – 10: 2010 World Junior Modern Pentathlon Championships in (Hungary) Székesfehérvár
  - Junior Individual winners: (Hungary) Bence Demeter (m) / (Hungary) Sarolta Kovács (f)
  - Junior Team Relay winners: (France) Florian Bou (m) / (United Kingdom) Kate French (f)
- September 1 – 7: 2010 World Modern Pentathlon Championships in (China) Chengdu
  - Individual winners: (Russia) Sergey Karyakin (m) / (France) Amélie Cazé (f)
  - Team Relay winners: (Belarus) Mihail Prokopenko (m) / (Bulgaria) Polina Struchkova (f)
  - Mixed winner: (Poland) Sylwia Gawlikowska

== Continental modern pentathlon events ==
- May 11 – 16: 2010 European Youth "A" Modern Pentathlon Championships in (Bulgaria) Varna
  - Youth Individual winners: (Hungary) Gergely Demeter (m) / (Russia) Gulnaz Gubaydullina (f)
  - Youth Team Relay winners: (France) Valentin Prades (m) / (Hungary) Zsófia Földházi (f)
  - Youth Mixed winner: (Lithuania) Gintarė Venčkauskaitė
- May 24 – 30: 2010 European Junior Modern Pentathlon Championships in (Portugal) Golegã
  - Junior Individual winners: (Poland) Remigiusz Golis (m) / (Russia) Ekaterina Khuraskina (f)
  - Junior Men's Team Relay winner: (Belarus) Mikalai Hayanouski
  - Junior Mixed Team Relay winner: (Russia) Ekaterina Khuraskina
- July 14 – 20: 2010 European Modern Pentathlon Championships in (Hungary) Debrecen
  - Individual winners: (Czech Republic) David Svoboda (m) / (France) Amélie Cazé (f)
  - Men's Team Relay winner: (Hungary) Ádám Marosi
- August 26 – 30: 2010 South American Junior & Senior Modern Pentathlon Championships in (Ecuador) Quito
  - Individual #1 winners: (Argentina) Emmanuel Zapata (m) / (Brazil) Priscila Oliveira (f)
  - Individual #2 winners: (Chile) Esteban Bustos (m) / (Brazil) Mariana Laporte (f)
  - Men's Individual #3 winner: (Brazil) Caio Silva
- September 9 – 13: 2010 European Youth "B" Modern Pentathlon Championships in (Bulgaria) Varna
  - Youth Individual winners: (United Kingdom) Joe Choong (m) / (United Kingdom) Alice Fitton (f)
  - Youth Team Relay winners: (Poland) Sebastian Stasiak (m) / (United Kingdom) Alice Fitton (f)
  - Youth Mixed winner: (Ukraine) Diana Golyadkina
- November 18 – 20: 2010 Pan American Modern Pentathlon Championships in (Brazil) Rio de Janeiro
  - Individual winners: (United States) William Brady (m) / (Brazil) Yane Marques (f)
  - Team Relay winners: (Mexico) Jorge Inzunza (m) / (Cuba) Kenia Campos (f)
  - Mixed winner: (Argentina) Pamela Zapata

== 2010 Modern Pentathlon World Cup ==
- March 4 – 7: MPWC #1 in (Mexico) Playa del Carmen
  - Individual winners: (Czech Republic) David Svoboda (m) / (Germany) Lena Schöneborn (f)
- March 18 – 21: MPWC #2 in (Egypt) Cairo
  - Individual winners: (Lithuania) Edvinas Krungolcas (m) / (Russia) Evdokia Gretchichnikova (f)
- April 8 – 11: MPWC #3 in (United Kingdom) Medway
  - Individual winners: (Hungary) Ádám Marosi (m) / (France) Amélie Cazé (f)
- May 6 – 9: MPWC #4 in (Hungary) Budapest
  - Individual winners: (Russia) Aleksander Lesun (m) / (Germany) Lena Schöneborn (f)
  - Relay winner: (Latvia) Jeļena Rubļevska
- June 3 – 6: MPWC #5 in (Germany) Berlin
  - Individual winners: (Russia) Ilia Frolov (m) / (Germany) Lena Schöneborn (f)
- June 18 – 20: MPWC #6 (final) in (Russia) Moscow
  - Individual winners: (Hungary) Ádám Marosi (m) / (Germany) Lena Schöneborn (f)
