= 2004 in modern pentathlon =

This article lists the main modern pentathlon events and their results for 2004.

== 2004 Summer Olympics (UIPM) ==
- August 26 & 27: Modern pentathlon at the 2004 Summer Olympics in (Greece) Athens at Goudi Olympic Complex
  - Men: (gold) (Russia) Andrey Moiseyev; (silver) (Lithuania) Andrejus Zadneprovskis; (bronze) (Czech Republic) Libor Capalini
  - Women: (gold) (Hungary) Zsuzsanna Vörös; (silver) (Latvia) Jeļena Rubļevska; (bronze) (United Kingdom) Georgina Harland

== Other international modern pentathlon events ==
- September 23 & 24: 2004 CISM Modern Pentathlon Championships in (Hungary) Székesfehérvár
  - Individual winners: (Czech Republic) Libor Capalini (m) / (Latvia) Jeļena Rubļevska (f)
  - Women's Team Relay winners: Italy (Claudia Corsini, Sara Bertoli, & Giulia Cafiero)

== World modern pentathlon events ==
- May 29 & 30: 2004 World Modern Pentathlon Championships in Moscow
  - Individual winners: (Lithuania) Andrejus Zadneprovskis (m) / (Hungary) Zsuzsanna Vörös (f)
  - Men's Team Relay winners: Russia (Aleksei Turkin, Dmitri Galkine, & Andrey Moiseyev)
  - Women's Team Relay winners: Poland (Paulina Boenisz, Marta Dziadura, & Magdalena Sedziak)
- July 28: 2004 World Junior Modern Pentathlon Championships in (Hungary) Székesfehérvár
  - Junior Individual winners: (Russia) Sergei Shouin (m) / (Poland) Sylwia Gawlikowska (f)
  - Junior Men's Team Relay winners: Russia (Alexei Velikodnyi & Mikhail Kuznetov)
  - Junior Women's Team Relay winners: Great Britain (Mhairi Spence, Katy Livingston, & Heather Fell)
- September 15: 2004 World Youth "A" Modern Pentathlon Championships in (Bulgaria) Albena
  - Youth Individual winners: (United Kingdom) Nick Woodbridge (m) / (Egypt) Aya Medany (f)

== Continental modern pentathlon events ==
- Note: There seems to be an error here, with regards to the European championships host city by the UIPM. It has both Mafra and Albena hosting the same event here.
- February 29: 2004 African Modern Pentathlon Championships in (Egypt) Cairo
  - Individual winners: (Hungary) Gábor Balogh (m) / (Latvia) Jeļena Rubļevska (f)
- April 14: 2004 Asian Modern Pentathlon Championships in (China) Beijing
  - Individual winners: (South Korea) HAN Do-ryung (m) / (Russia) Ludmila Sirotkina (f)
- April 17 & 20: 2004 European Modern Pentathlon Championships in (Portugal) Mafra
  - Individual winners: (Hungary) Róbert Kasza (m) / (Hungary) Katalin Prill (f)
  - Men's Team Relay winners: Poland (Szymon Staśkiewicz, Lukasz Lis, & Michal Kacer)
  - Women's Team Relay winners: Hungary (Ildiko Hidvegi, Katalin Prill, & Zsofia Bartalis)
- May 18 & 19: 2004 European Junior Modern Pentathlon Championships in (Poland) Drzonków
  - Junior Individual winners: (France) Cedric Pla (m) / (Bulgaria) Polina Struchkova (f)
- September 27: 2004 European Modern Pentathlon Championships in (Bulgaria) Albena
  - Individual winners: (Lithuania) Edvinas Krungolcas (m) / (Hungary) Csilla Füri (f)
  - Men's Team Relay winner: (Hungary) Ádám Marosi
  - Women's Team Relay winners: Hungary (Adrienn Szathmary, Zsuzsanna Vörös, & Csilla Füri)

== 2004 Modern Pentathlon World Cup ==
- March 14: MPWC #1 in (Mexico) Querétaro City
  - Individual winners: (Sweden) Erik Johansson (m) / (Latvia) Jeļena Rubļevska (f)
- March 20 & 21: MPWC #2 in (Brazil) Rio de Janeiro
  - Individual winners: (Hungary) Viktor Horváth (m) / (United Kingdom) Georgina Harland (f)
- April 24 & 26: MPWC #3 in (China) Beijing
  - Individual winners: (Hungary) Gábor Balogh (m) / (Russia) Tatiana Mouratova (f)
- May 8 & 9: MPWC #4 in (Hungary) Budapest
  - Individual winners: (Russia) Andrey Moiseyev (m) / (Ukraine) Victoria Tereshchuk (f)
- September 11 & 12: MPWC #5 (final) in (Germany) Darmstadt
  - Individual winners: (Lithuania) Edvinas Krungolcas (m) / (United Kingdom) Kate Allenby (f)
