= 2006 in modern pentathlon =

This article lists the main modern pentathlon events and their results for 2006.

== International modern pentathlon events ==
- May 24 – 30: 2006 CISM Modern Pentathlon Championships in (Lithuania) Kaunas
  - Individual winners: (Russia) Nikolay Yaskov (m) / (Ukraine) Victoria Tereshchuk (f)
- July 15 – 30: 2006 Central American and Caribbean Games in (Colombia) Cartagena
  - Individual winners: (Mexico) Óscar Soto (m) / (Mexico) Andrea Avena (f)

== World modern pentathlon events ==
- August 7 – 13: 2006 World Junior Modern Pentathlon Championships in (China) Shanghai
  - Junior Individual winners: (Czech Republic) David Svoboda (m) / (Egypt) Aya Medany (f)
- August 21 – 26: 2006 World Youth "A" Modern Pentathlon Championships in (Italy) Popoli
  - Youth Individual winners: (Czech Republic) Ondřej Polívka (m) / (Egypt) Aya Medany (f)
- November 15 – 22: 2006 World Modern Pentathlon Championships in Guatemala City
  - Individual winners: (Lithuania) Edvinas Krungolcas (m) / (Poland) Marta Dziadura (f)

== Continental modern pentathlon events ==
- April 17 – 24: 2006 European Junior Modern Pentathlon Championships in (Portugal) Torres Vedras
  - Junior Individual winners: (Ukraine) Dmytro Kirpulyanskyy (m) / (Belarus) Anastasiya Prokopenko (f)
- June 30 – July 2: 2006 Pan American (NORCECA) Modern Pentathlon Championships in Mexico City
  - Individual Results #1: (United States) Eli Bremer (m) / (Canada) Monica Pinette (f)
  - Individual Results #2: (Guatemala) Andrei Gheorghe (m) / (Mexico) Naciely Anton (f)
- July 6 – 9: 2006 European Youth "B" Modern Pentathlon Championships in (Czech Republic) Prague
  - Youth Individual winners: (Poland) Remigiusz Golis (m) / (Poland) Joanna Gomolinska (f)
- July 13 – 18: 2006 European Modern Pentathlon Championships in (Hungary) Budapest
  - Individual winners: (Hungary) Gábor Balogh (m) / (Hungary) Zsuzsanna Vörös (f)
- July 26 – 30: 2006 European Youth "A" Modern Pentathlon Championships in (Poland) Łódź
  - Youth Individual winners: (Poland) Michal Kacer (m) / (Germany) Janine Kohlmann (f)
- October 6 – 8: 2006 South American Modern Pentathlon Championships in (Brazil) Resende
  - Individual winners: (Brazil) Daniel Santos (m) / (Brazil) Yane Marques (f)
- November 7 – 11: 2006 Asian Senior & Junior Modern Pentathlon Championships in (Chinese Taipei) Kaohsiung
  - Individual winners: (South Korea) LEE Sung-hyun (m) / (South Korea) Yun Cho-rong (f)
  - Women's Junior Individual winner: (South Korea) Yun Cho-rong

== 2006 Modern Pentathlon World Cup ==
- March 2 – 5: MPWC #1 in (Mexico) Acapulco
  - Individual winners: (Hungary) Viktor Horváth (m) / (Italy) Claudia Corsini (f)
- April 6 – 9: MPWC #2 in (United Kingdom) Millfield
  - Individual winners: (Belarus) Dzmitry Meliakh (m) / (Egypt) Aya Medany (f)
- April 20 – 23: MPWC #3 for Men in (Germany) Berlin
  - Winner: (Russia) Alexei Velikodnyi
- May 11 – 14: MPWC #3 for Women in (Russia) Moscow
  - Winner: (Czech Republic) Lucie Grolichová
- May 11 – 14: MPWC #4 for Men in (Hungary) Budapest
  - Winner: (Lithuania) Edvinas Krungolcas
- June 3 & 4: MPWC #4 for Women in (Hungary) Székesfehérvár
  - Winner: (Ukraine) Victoria Tereshchuk
- September 10 – 12: MPWC #5 in (Egypt) Cairo
  - Individual winners: (China) Cao Zhongrong (m) / (Egypt) Aya Medany (f)
- September 19 – 24: MPWC #6 in (Italy) Chianciano Terme
  - Individual winners: (Russia) Andrey Moiseyev (m) / (Poland) Paulina Boenisz (f)
- September 27 & 28: MPWC #7 (final) in (Italy) Chianciano Terme
  - Individual winners: (Czech Republic) Libor Capalini (m) / (Italy) Alessia Pieretti (f)
