= 2010 World Modern Pentathlon Championships =

World morden penthathlon

2010 World Championships
- Location: Chengdu, China
- Dates: 1–7 September

The 2010 World Modern Pentathlon Championships were held in Chengdu, China from 1 to 7 to September 2010.

== Medal summary ==
=== Men's events ===
Event	(gold) Gold	(silver) Silver	(bronze) Bronze
Individual	Sergey Karyakin (RUS)	Aleksander Lesun (RUS)	Justinas Kinderis (LTU)
Team	LTU; Justinas Kinderis; Edvinas Krungolcas; Tomas Makarovas	CZE; Ondřej Polívka; Michal Sedlecky; David Svoboda	HUN; Ádám Marosi; Róbert Kasza; Róbert Németh
Relay	BLR; Mihail Prokopenko; Mikhail Mitsyk; Dzmitry Meliakh	KOR; Jung Hwon-ho; Nam Dong-hoon; Kim Soeng-jin	RUS; Andrey Moiseyev; Ilia Frolov; Aleksander Lesun

=== Women's events ===
Event	(gold) Gold	(silver) Silver	(bronze) Bronze
Individual	Amélie Cazé (FRA)	Donata Rimšaitė (LTU)	Lena Schöneborn (GER)
Team	FRA; Amélie Cazé; Elfie Arnaud; Anais Eudes	GBR; Heather Fell; Samantha Murray; Freyja Prentice	GER; Lena Schöneborn; Annika Schleu; Eva Trautmann
Relay	Russia; Polina Struchtkova; Evdokia Gretchichnikova; Ekaterina Khuraskina	France; Amélie Cazé; Elfie Arnaud; Élodie Clouvel	China; Chen Qian; Miao Yihua; Zhang Ye

=== Mixed events ===
Event	(gold) Gold	(silver) Silver	(bronze) Bronze
Relay	POL; Sylvia Czwojdzinska; Remigiusz Golis	UKR; Victoria Tereshchuk; Pavlo Tymoshchenko	LTU; Donata Rimšaitė; Justinas Kinderis

== Medal table ==
* Host nation (China)

Rank	Nation	Gold	Silver	Bronze	Total
1	Russia (RUS)	2	1	1	4
2	France (FRA)	2	1	0	3
3	Lithuania (LTU)	1	1	2	4
4	Belarus (BLR)	1	0	0	1
4	Poland (POL)	1	0	0	1
6	Czech Republic (CZE)	0	1	0	1
6	Great Britain (GBR)	0	1	0	1
6	South Korea (KOR)	0	1	0	1
6	Ukraine (UKR)	0	1	0	1
10	Germany (GER)	0	0	2	2
11	China (CHN)*	0	0	1	1
11	Hungary (HUN)	0	0	1	1
Totals (12 entries)		7	7	7	21

== See also ==
- World Modern Pentathlon Championship
