= 2013 World Modern Pentathlon Championships =

Sporting event

2013 World Championships
- Location: Kaohsiung, Taiwan
- Dates: 19–28 August

The 2013 World Modern Pentathlon Championships was held in Kaohsiung, Taiwan from August 19 to August 28, 2013. The event includes pistol shooting, fencing, 200m swimming, show jumping and a 3 km run.

== Medal summary ==
=== Men's events ===
Event	(gold) Gold	(silver) Silver	(bronze) Bronze
Individual	Justinas Kinderis (LTU)	Nicholas Woodbridge (GBR)	Aleksander Lesun (RUS)
Team	France; Jean Maxence Berrou; Christopher Patte; Valentin Prades	Russia; Ilia Frolov; Sergey Karyakin; Aleksander Lesun	South Korea; Jung Jin-hwa; Jung Hwon-ho; Lee Woo-jin
Relay	Hungary; Bence Demeter; Róbert Kasza; Ádám Marosi	China; Cai Zhaohong; Chen Fulao; Guo Jianli	Russia; Ilia Frolov; Aleksander Lesun; Dmitry Lukach

=== Women's events ===
Event	(gold) Gold	(silver) Silver	(bronze) Bronze
Individual	Laura Asadauskaitė (LTU)	Yane Marques (BRA)	Donata Rimšaitė (RUS)
Team	Great Britain; Kate French; Samantha Murray; Mhairi Spence	China; Chen Qian; Liang Wanxia; Zhang Xiaonan	Ukraine; Ganna Buriak; Anastasiya Spas; Victoria Tereshchuk
Relay	Ukraine; Ganna Buriak; Iryna Khokhlova; Victoria Tereshchuk	Hungary; Zsófia Földházi; Leila Gyenesei; Sarolta Kovács	Russia; Alise Fakhrutdinova; Liudmila Kukushkina; Donata Rimšaitė

=== Mixed events ===
Event	(gold) Gold	(silver) Silver	(bronze) Bronze
Relay	France; Elodie Clouvel; Valentin Belaud	Latvia; Elena Rublevska; Deniss Cerkovskis	Ukraine; Iryna Khokhlova; Pavlo Tymoshchenko

== Medal table ==
	Nation	(gold) Gold	(silver) Silver	(bronze) Bronze	Total
1.	France	2	0	0	2
1.	Lithuania	2	0	0	2
3.	Great Britain	1	1	0	2
3.	Hungary	1	1	0	2
5.	Ukraine	1	0	2	3
6.	China	0	2	0	2
7.	Russia	0	1	4	5
8.	Brazil	0	1	0	1
8.	Latvia	0	1	0	1
10.	South Korea	0	0	1	1
Total		7	7	7	21

== See also ==
- List of sporting events in Taiwan
- Union Internationale de Pentathlon Moderne (UIPM)
