= 2012 World Modern Pentathlon Championships =

World morden penthathlon

2012 World Championships
- Location: Rome, Italy
- Dates: 7–13 May

The 2012 World Modern Penthathlon Championship was held in Rome, Italy from May 7 to May 13, 2012. The event included pistol shooting, fencing, 200m swimming, show jumping and a 3 km run.

== Medal summary ==
=== Men's events ===
Event	(gold) Gold	(silver) Silver	(bronze) Bronze
Individual	Aleksander Lesun (RUS)	Andrey Moiseyev (RUS)	Jung Jin-Hwa (KOR)
Team	Italy; Nicola Benedetti; Riccardo De Luca; Pierpaolo Petroni	Russia; Ilia Frolov; Sergey Karyakin; Aleksander Lesun	South Korea; Hong Jin-woo; Hwang Woo-jin; Jung Jin-hwa
Relay	South Korea; Hong Jin-woo; Hwang Woo-jin; Jung Jin-hwa	Germany; Delf Borrmann; Stefan Kollner; Alexander Nobis	Russia; Maksim Kustov; Alexander Savkin; Ilya Shugarov

=== Women's events ===
Event	(gold) Gold	(silver) Silver	(bronze) Bronze
Individual	Mhairi Spence (GBR)	Chen Qian (CHN)	Samantha Murray (GBR)
Team	Great Britain; Heather Fell; Samantha Murray; Mhairi Spence	Hungary; Leila Gyenesei; Sarolta Kovács; Adrienn Tóth	China; Chen Qian; Miao Yihua; Zhang Ye
Relay	Germany; Janine Kohlmann; Annika Schleu; Lena Schöneborn	China; Qian Chen; Miao Yihua; Zhu Wenjing	Great Britain; Katy Burke; Kate French; Katy Livingston

=== Mixed events ===
Event	(gold) Gold	(silver) Silver	(bronze) Bronze
Relay	Ukraine; Ganna Buriak; Oleksandr Mordasov	Russia; Svetlana Lebedeva; Maxim Kuznetsov	China; Zhang Ye; Cao Zhongrong

== Medal table ==
	Nation	(gold) Gold	(silver) Silver	(bronze) Bronze	Total
1.	Great Britain	2	0	2	4
2.	Russia	1	3	1	5
3.	Germany	1	1	0	2
4.	South Korea	1	0	2	3
5.	Italy	1	0	0	1
5.	Ukraine	1	0	0	1
7.	China	0	2	2	4
8.	Hungary	0	1	0	1
Total		7	7	7	21
