= 2011 World Modern Pentathlon Championships =

World morden penthathlon

2011 World Championships
- Location: Moscow, Russia
- Dates: 8–14 September

The 2011 World Modern Penthathlon Championship was held in Moscow, Russia from September 8 to September 14, 2011. The event was supposed to take place in Cairo but because of the 2011 Egyptian revolution it was moved to avoid any further political instability. The event included pistol shooting, fencing, 200 m swimming, show jumping and a 3 km run. For the first time laser pistols were used.

== Medal summary ==
=== Men's events ===
Event	(gold) Gold	(silver) Silver	(bronze) Bronze
Individual	Andrey Moiseyev (RUS)	Aleksander Lesun (RUS)	Ádám Marosi (HUN)
Team	Russia; Ilia Frolov; Sergey Karyakin; Aleksander Lesun	Hungary; Bence Demeter; Róbert Kasza; Ádám Marosi	Italy; Nicola Benedetti; Riccardo De Luca; Auro Franceschini
Relay	Hungary; Róbert Kasza; Ádám Marosi; Péter Tibolya	South Korea; Hong Jin-woo; Hwang Woo-jin; Lee Choon-huan	Ukraine; Pavlo Kirpulyanskyy; Oleksandr Mordasov; Pavlo Tymoshchenko

=== Women's events ===
Event	(gold) Gold	(silver) Silver	(bronze) Bronze
Individual	Victoria Tereshchuk (UKR)	Sarolta Kovács (HUN)	Laura Asadauskaitė (LTU)
Team	Germany; Annika Schleu; Lena Schöneborn; Eva Trautmann	Hungary; Leila Gyenesei; Sarolta Kovács; Adrienn Tóth	Russia; Evdokia Gretchichnikova; Ekaterina Khuraskina; Yuliya Kolegova
Relay	Hungary; Leila Gyenesei; Sarolta Kovács; Adrienn Tóth	Germany; Annika Schleu; Lena Schöneborn; Eva Trautmann	Ukraine; Ganna Buriak; Nataliia Levchenko; Victoria Tereshchuk

=== Mixed events ===
Event	(gold) Gold	(silver) Silver	(bronze) Bronze
Relay	Ukraine; Victoria Tereshchuk; Pavlo Kirpulyanskyy	Russia; Evdokia Gretchichnikova; Sergey Karyakin	Lithuania; Laura Asadauskaitė; Justinas Kinderis

== Medal table ==
	Nation	(gold) Gold	(silver) Silver	(bronze) Bronze	Total
1.	Hungary	2	3	1	6
2.	Russia	2	2	1	5
3.	Ukraine	2	0	2	4
4.	Germany	1	1	0	2
5.	South Korea	0	1	0	1
6.	Lithuania	0	0	2	2
7.	Italy	0	0	1	1
Total		7	7	7	21
