= 2021 World Modern Pentathlon Championships =

2021 World Championships
- Location: Cairo, Egypt
- Dates: 8–14 June

The 2021 World Modern Pentathlon Championships was held from 8 to 14 June 2021 in Cairo, Egypt.

Originally championships were meant to be held in Minsk, Belarus, but due instability in Belarus championships been moved to Egypt.

== Medal table ==
* Host nation (Egypt)

Rank	Nation	Gold	Silver	Bronze	Total
1	Hungary	2	1	2	5
2	Belarus	2	1	1	4
3	RMPF	1	2	0	3
4	Germany	1	1	1	3
5	South Korea	1	1	0	2
6	France	0	1	0	1
7	Egypt*	0	0	2	2
8	China	0	0	1	1
Totals (8 entries)		7	7	7	21

== Medal summary ==
=== Men ===
Event	Gold		Silver		Bronze	
Individual	Ádám Marosi; Hungary	1435	Alexander Lifanov; RMPF	1426	Ahmed Elgendy; Egypt	1417
Team	Hungary; Ádám Marosi; Richárd Bereczki; Bence Demeter	4185	Germany; Fabian Liebig; Marvin Faly Dogue; Patrick Dogue	4183	Egypt; Eslam Hamad; Ahmed Hamed; Ahmed Elgendy	4171
Relay	RMPF; Alexander Lifanov; Maxim Kuznetsov	1491	South Korea; Jung Jin-hwa; Jun Woong-tae	1486	China; Han Jiahao; Zhang Linbin	1482

=== Women ===
Event	Gold		Silver		Bronze	
Individual	Anastasiya Prokopenko; Belarus	1353	Élodie Clouvel; France	1341	Michelle Gulyás; Hungary	1339
Team	Germany; Annika Schleu; Rebecca Langrehr; Janine Kohlmann	3960	Hungary; Blanka Guzi; Tamara Alekszejev; Michelle Gulyás	3907	Belarus; Anastasiya Prokopenko; Iryna Prasiantsova; Volha Silkina	3898
Relay	Belarus; Iryna Prasiantsova; Volha Silkina	1395	RMPF; Gulnaz Gubaydullina; Uliana Batashova	1383	Hungary; Rita Erdős; Sarolta Simon	1343

=== Mixed ===
Event	Gold		Silver		Bronze	
Relay	South Korea; Seo Chang-wan; Kim Se-hee	1432	Belarus; Ilya Palazkov; Anastasiya Prokopenko	1422	Germany; Patrick Dogue; Rebecca Langrehr	1415
