= Pernille Svarre =

Danish pentathlon athlete

Pernille Svarre (born 19 November 1961) is a Danish athlete who has specialized in Triathlon and Modern Pentathlon. She competed in the Modern Pentathlon at the 2000 Summer Olympics in Sydney, Australia, and has been Danish Modern Pentathlon champion 12 times between 1980 and 2014. In June 2000, she won the gold medal in Modern Pentathlon at the Senior Women World Championship in Pesaro, Italy.

== Biography ==
Born on 19 November 1961, Pernille Svarre is a resident of Hillerød in the north of Zealand. In the course of her career, she has been Danish Modern Pentathlon champion 12 times, namely in 1980, 1981, 1982, 1984, 1985, 1986, 1993, 1997, 1998, 2000, 2001 and 2014.

In addition to various titles in Modern Pentathlon, in 1987 and 1988 she competed in the Ironman World Championship in Hawaii and won bronze at the Middle-Distance European Triathlon Championship in 1988. In June 2000, she became World Champion in Modern Pentathlon, winning gold at the Championship in Pesaro, Italy. The same year, she was the first Danish woman to compete in the modern pentathlon at the Summer Olympics where the discipline was included for the first time.

Her most recent success was to win the Danish Modern Pentathlon Championship in 2014, despite the fact that she had not competed for 13 years. She explained: "I had achieved my goals and had finally given up competing. But then I suddenly felt like trying again. I've maintained my form, so before the event I just spent 14 days training in riding — and couldn't walk for the next week."
