= 2007 World Modern Pentathlon Championships =

World morden penthathlon

2007 World Championships
- Location: Berlin, Germany
- Dates: 18–21 August

The 2007 World Modern Pentathlon Championships were held in Berlin, Germany from August 18 to August 21.

== Medal summary ==
=== Men's events ===
Event	(gold) Gold	(silver) Silver	(bronze) Bronze
Individual	Viktor Horváth (HUN)	Ilia Frolov (RUS)	Róbert Németh (HUN)
Team	Germany; Steffen Gebhardt; Eric Walther; Sebastian Dietz	Czech Republic; David Svoboda; Michal Michalík; Libor Capalini	Hungary; Viktor Horváth; Sándor Fülep; Gábor Balogh
Relay	Germany; Steffen Gebhardt; Eric Walther; Sebastian Dietz	China; Cao Zhongrong; Qian Zhenhua; Xu Yunqi	Czech Republic; David Svoboda; Michal Michalík; Ondřej Polívka

=== Women's events ===
Event	(gold) Gold	(silver) Silver	(bronze) Bronze
Individual	Amélie Cazé (FRA)	Lena Schoneborn (GER)	Laura Asadauskaitė (LTU)
Team	Belarus; Tatsiana Mazurkevich; Anastasiya Samusevich; Hanna Arkhipenka	Germany; Lena Schoneborn; Eva Trautmann; Claudia Knack	Russia; Liudmila Sirotkina; Tatiana Mouratova; Evdokia Gretchichnikova
Relay	Great Britain; Lindsey Weedon; Mhairi Spence; Katie Livingston	Poland; Sylwia Czwojdzińska; Paulina Boenisz; Marta Dziadura	Germany; Lena Schoneborn; Eva Trautmann; Janine Kohlmann

== See also ==
- Modern Pentathlon at the 2008 Summer Olympics
- World Modern Pentathlon Championship
