= 2017 World Modern Pentathlon Championships =

International sports competition

2017 World Championships
- Location: Cairo, Egypt
- Dates: 21–29 August

The 2017 World Modern Pentathlon Championships were held in Cairo, Egypt from 21 to 29 August 2017. The events include pistol shooting, fencing, 200m swimming, show jumping and a 3 km run.

== Medal summary ==
=== Men ===
| Event | Gold | | Silver | | Bronze | |
|---|---|---|---|---|---|---|
| Individual | Jung Jin-hwa; South Korea | 1,400 | Róbert Kasza; Hungary | 1,393 | Justinas Kinderis; Lithuania | 1,382 |
| Team | Egypt; Eslam Hamad; Ahmed Hamed; Yasser Hefny | 3,954 | Poland; Sebastian Stasiak; Szymon Staśkiewicz; Jarosław Świderski | 3,947 | South Korea; Hwang Woo-jin; Jun Woong-tae; Jung Jin-hwa | 3,766 |
| Relay | South Korea; Hwang Woo-jin; Jun Woong-tae | 1,422 | Germany; Christian Zillekens; Alexander Nobis | 1,419 | Belarus; Ilya Palazkov; Pavel Tsikhanau | 1,407 |

=== Women ===
| Event | Gold | | Silver | | Bronze | |
|---|---|---|---|---|---|---|
| Individual | Gulnaz Gubaydullina; Russia | 1,292 | Zsófia Földházi; Hungary | 1,285 | Anastasiya Prokopenko; Belarus | 1,281 |
| Team | Hungary; Tamara Alekszejev; Zsófia Földházi; Sarolta Kovács | 3,792 | Russia; Uliana Batashova; Anna Buriak; Gulnaz Gubaydullina | 3,779 | Germany; Alexandra Bettinellil; Annika Schleu; Lena Schöneborn | 3,705 |
| Relay | Germany; Annika Schleu; Lena Schöneborn | 1,276 | Egypt; Mariam Amer; Sondos Aboubakar | 1,243 | Japan; Shino Yamanaka; Rena Shimazu | 1,238 |

=== Mixed ===
| Event | Gold | | Silver | | Bronze | |
|---|---|---|---|---|---|---|
| Relay | Germany; Ronja Steinborn; Alexander Nobis | 1,391 | Egypt; Haydy Morsy; Eslam Hamad | 1,381 | France; Julie Belhamri; Valentin Belaud | 1,370 |

== Medal table ==
* Host nation (Egypt)

| Rank | Nation | Gold | Silver | Bronze | Total |
|---|---|---|---|---|---|
| 1 | Germany (GER) | 2 | 1 | 1 | 4 |
| 2 | South Korea (KOR) | 2 | 0 | 1 | 3 |
| 3 | Egypt (EGY)* | 1 | 2 | 0 | 3 |
| 3 | Hungary (HUN) | 1 | 2 | 0 | 3 |
| 5 | Russia (RUS) | 1 | 1 | 0 | 2 |
| 6 | Poland (POL) | 0 | 1 | 0 | 1 |
| 7 | Belarus (BLR) | 0 | 0 | 2 | 2 |
| 8 | France (FRA) | 0 | 0 | 1 | 1 |
| 8 | Japan (JPN) | 0 | 0 | 1 | 1 |
| 8 | Lithuania (LTU) | 0 | 0 | 1 | 1 |
| Totals (10 entries) | | 7 | 7 | 7 | 21 |
