= Leila Gyenesei =

Hungarian modern pentathlete and cross-country skier

Leila Gyenesei OLY
Personal information
- Nationality: Hungary
- Born: 22 April 1986 (age 40) Kaposvár, Hungary
- Height: 1.80 m (5 ft 11 in)
- Weight: 61 kg (134 lb)

Sport
- Sport: Modern pentathlon Cross-country skiing
- Club: Építők AC Kaposvár
- Coached by: Antal Kulcsár
Medal record
Women's modern pentathlon
Representing Hungary
World Championships
| Gold medal – first place | 2008 Budapest | Relay |
| Gold medal – first place | 2011 Moscow | Relay |
| Silver medal – second place | 2011 Moscow | Team |
| Silver medal – second place | 2012 Rome | Team |
| Bronze medal – third place | 2008 Budapest | Team |
| Bronze medal – third place | 2009 London | Team |

Leila Gyenesei (born 22 April 1986) is a Hungarian modern pentathlete and cross-country skier. She is a five-time medalist at the World Championships, and is currently ranked no. 19 in the world by the Union Internationale de Pentathlon Moderne (UIPM). She is also the daughter of István Gyenesei, former Minister of Local Government and chairman of the Association for Somogy party.

== Career ==
Gyenesei started out her sporting career as a triathlete and swimmer, until she began with cross-country skiing at the age of eighteen. She first competed at the 2006 Winter Olympics in Turin, Italy, and placed sixty-ninth in the women's 10 km classical cross-country skiing, with a time of 36:43.0. Shortly after the games, Gyenesei announced that she would no longer participate in any winter sporting events. Instead, she decided to focus on and compete for the modern pentathlon, a sport in which she had never done before.

In 2007, Gyenesei moved to Székesfehérvár in central Hungary to work and train with a large number of top-level athletes, including 2004 Olympic champion Zsuzsanna Vörös. She began competing as a modern pentathlete at the national junior and senior championships and had achieved her first title in the team event. The following year, she reached into the international scene by competing at the World Modern Pentathlon Championships in Budapest, where she had won two medals, including gold for the women's team relay.

Following her early success from the World Championships, Gyenesei qualified for the 2008 Summer Olympics in Beijing, along with Vörös, to compete in the women's event. During the competition, Gyenesei struggled to attain a higher position in the early rounds, with deficient scores in pistol shooting and a one-touch épée fencing. She quickly moved to the top of the rankings, when she finished fourth in freestyle swimming, and eighth in horse riding. In the end, Gyenesei finished the event with cross-country running in twenty-fourth place, for a total score of 5,260 points.

In 2009, Gyenesei made her breakthrough season in the international scene, when she won a gold medal for the women's individual event at the Bath International Competition in Bath, England. She also upset Great Britain's Heather Fell to claim the bronze at the UIPM World Cup in Rio de Janeiro, Brazil, which included a newly combined running and shooting segment.

At the 2011 World Modern Pentathlon Championships in Moscow, Russia, Gyenesei, together with her teammates Sarolta Kovács and Adrienn Tóth, displayed a spectacular performance to capture their second title in the women's relay. She also added two more gold medals for team and relay events at the European Championships, making her as one of Hungary's most successful modern pentathletes in its sporting history.
