= Irina Kiseleva =

Soviet modern pentathlete

Personal information
- Born: 23 July 1967
- Height: 1.78 m (5 ft 10 in)

Sport
- Sport: Modern pentathlon
Medal record
Women's modern pentathlon
Representing Soviet Union
World Championships
Gold medal – first place	1984 Copenhagen	Individual
Silver medal – second place	1985 Montreal	Individual
Silver medal – second place	1985 Montreal	Team
Gold medal – first place	1986 Montecatini Terme	Team
Gold medal – first place	1987 Bensheim	Individual
Gold medal – first place	1987 Bensheim	Individual
Silver medal – second place	1988 Warsaw	Individual

Irina Vladimirovna Kiseleva (Russian: Ирина Владимировна Киселева; born 23 July 1967) is a former Soviet modern pentathlete. She won medals at five consecutive World Modern Pentathlon Championships from 1984 through 1988. These included two gold medals and two silver medals in the individual competition. She also two gold medals and one silver medal in the team competition.
