= Eva Fjellerup =

Danish fencer

Personal information
- Born: 30 April 1962 (age 64) Gentofte, Hovedstaden, Denmark

Sport
- Sport: Fencing, Modern pentathlon

Eva Fjellerup (born 30 April 1962) is a Danish fencer. She competed in the women's individual épée event at the 1996 Summer Olympics.
