= Nicola Benedetti (pentathlete) =

Italian modern pentathlete (born 1985)

Personal information
- Born: 26 December 1985 (age 40) Modena, Italy
- Height: 1.98 m (6 ft 6 in)
- Weight: 88 kg (194 lb)

Sport
- Country: Italy
- Sport: Modern pentathlon
- Coached by: Marco Quattrini
Medal record
World Championships
Gold medal – first place	2012 Rome	Team
Bronze medal – third place	2011 Moscow	Team
European Championships
Silver medal – second place	2011 Medway	Team
- Updated on 24 August 2012

Nicola Benedetti (born 26 December 1985) is an Italian modern pentathlete. He competed at the 2008 and 2012 Summer Olympics. At the London 2012 Olympics, Benedetti set a world record time of 9:23.63 in the running element.
