= Andrejus Zadneprovskis =

Lithuanian modern pentathlete (born 1974)

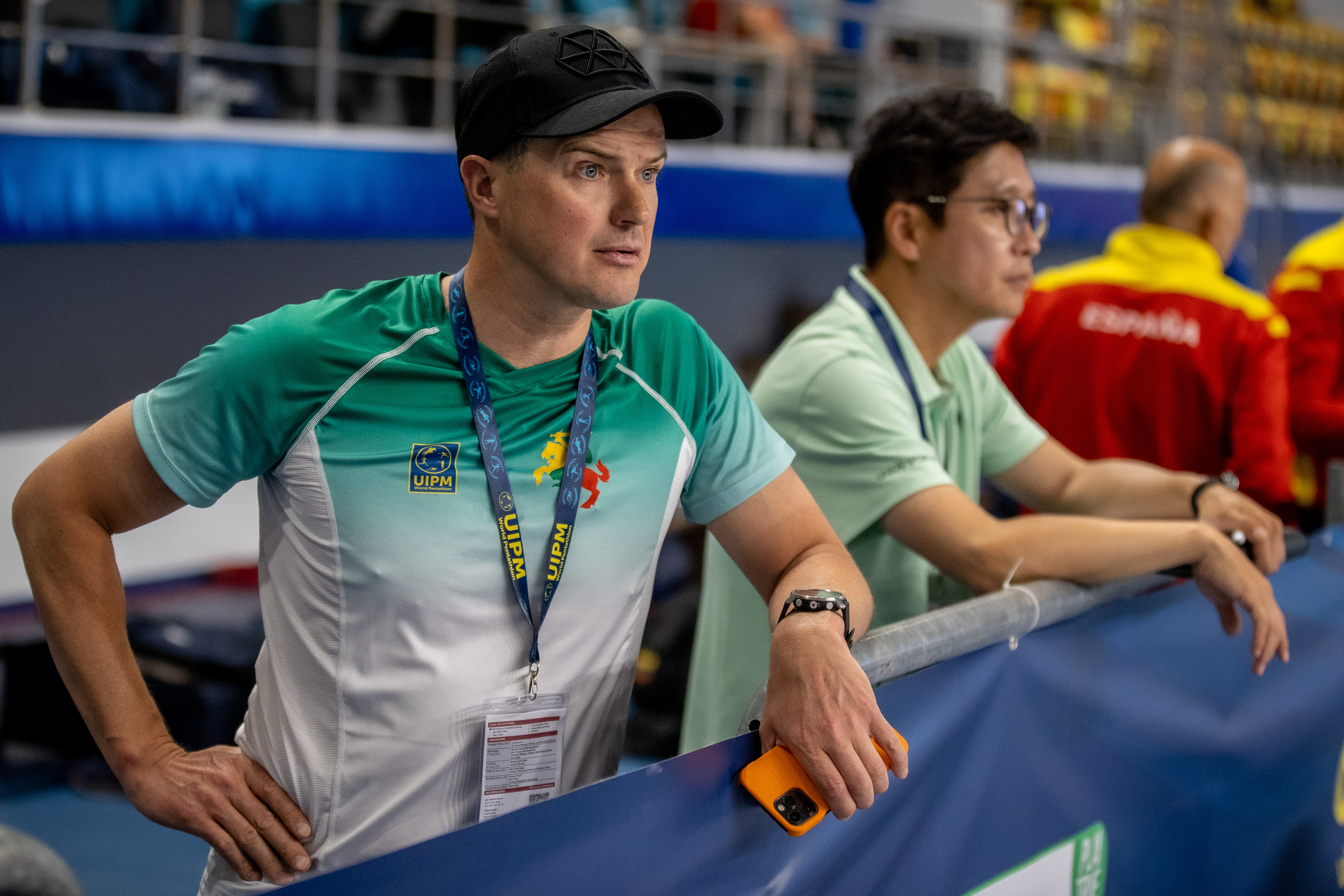
- 2023

Personal information
- Born: August 31, 1974 (age 51) Kaliningrad, Russian SFSR, Soviet Union
Medal record
Men's modern pentathlon
Representing Lithuania
Olympic Games
Silver medal – second place	2004 Athens	Individual
Bronze medal – third place	2008 Beijing	Individual
World Championships
Gold medal – first place	2000 Pesaro	Individual
Gold medal – first place	2004 Moscow	Individual
Gold medal – first place	2006 Guatemala City	Team
Gold medal – first place	2010 Chengdu	Team
Silver medal – second place	1999 Budapest	Team
Silver medal – second place	2001 Millfield	Team
Silver medal – second place	2008 Budapest	Relay
Bronze medal – third place	1997 Sofia	Individual
Bronze medal – third place	2002 San Francisco	Team
Bronze medal – third place	2006 Guatemala City	Individual
Bronze medal – third place	2009 London	Team
European Championships
Gold medal – first place	2001 Sofia	Individual
Gold medal – first place	2009 Leipzig	Team
Silver medal – second place	2002 Ústí nad Labem	Team
Silver medal – second place	2002 Ústí nad Labem	Individual
Bronze medal – third place	2010 Debrecen	Team

Andrejus Zadneprovskis (born August 31, 1974) is a retired Lithuanian modern pentathlete who won the silver medal at the 2004 Summer Olympics in Athens, Greece, as well as bronze medal at the 2008 Summer Olympics in Beijing. Zadneprovskis won the gold medal in the Modern Pentathlon World Championships in the year of 2000 and 2004. He also earned the bronze medal at the Modern Pentathlon World Championships 2006 in Guatemala. In 2010 he retired from sport due to health problems.

In 2009 he married modern pentathlete Laura Asadauskaitė, who won the gold medal at the 2012 Summer Olympics. They have daughter who was born in 2010. He also has a daughter with his ex-girlfriend.

In 2012 Zadneprovskis was elected to the UIPM executives. In 2014 Zadneprovskis became the president of the Lithuanian Padel Tennis Federation.
