= Sébastien Deleigne =

French modern pentathlete

Personal information
- Born: 4 July 1967 (age 59) Toulouse, France

Sport
- Sport: Modern pentathlon

Sébastien Deleigne (born 4 July 1967) is a French modern pentathlete. He competed in four Olympic Games between 1992 and 2004.
