= 2009 World Modern Pentathlon Championships =

World morden penthathlon

2009 World Championships
- Location: (United Kingdom) London, UK
- Dates: 11–14 August

The 2009 World Modern Pentathlon Championship were held in London, UK from August 11 to August 14.

== Medal summary ==
=== Men's events ===
Event	(gold) Gold	(silver) Silver	(bronze) Bronze
Individual	Ádám Marosi (HUN)	David Svoboda (CZE)	Dmytro Kirpulyanskyy (UKR)
Team	Hungary; Ádám Marosi; Róbert Németh; Péter Tibolya	Czech Republic; David Svoboda; Michal Michalík; Ondřej Polívka	Lithuania; Justinas Kinderis; Edvinas Krungolcas; Andrejus Zadneprovskis
Relay	Czech Republic; David Svoboda; Ondřej Polívka	Russia; Semen Burtsev; Sergey Karyakin	Egypt; Amro El Geziry; Omar El Geziry

=== Women's events ===
Event	(gold) Gold	(silver) Silver	(bronze) Bronze
Individual	Chen Qian (CHN)	Laura Asadauskaitė (LTU)	Lena Schoneborn (GER)
Team	Germany; Lena Schoneborn; Eva Trautmann; Claudia Knack	Great Britain; Heather Fell; Mhairi Spence; Freyja Prentice	Hungary; Sarolta Kovács; Krisztina Cseh; Leila Gyenesei
Relay	Czech Republic; Lucia Grolichová; Natalie Dianová	Germany; Lena Schoneborn; Eva Trautmann	Poland; Sylwia Czwojdzińska; Paulina Boenisz

== Medal table ==
* Host nation (Great Britain)

Rank	Nation	Gold	Silver	Bronze	Total
1	Czech Republic (CZE)	2	2	0	4
2	Hungary (HUN)	2	0	1	3
3	Germany (GER)	1	1	1	3
4	China (CHN)	1	0	0	1
5	Lithuania (LTU)	0	1	1	2
6	Great Britain (GBR)*	0	1	0	1
6	Russia (RUS)	0	1	0	1
8	Egypt (EGY)	0	0	1	1
8	Poland (POL)	0	0	1	1
8	Ukraine (UKR)	0	0	1	1
Totals (10 entries)		6	6	6	18

== See also ==
- World Modern Pentathlon Championship
