= Gulnaz Gubaydullina =

Russian modern pentathlete

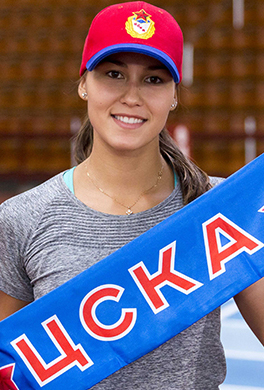

Personal information
- National team: Russia
- Born: 14 February 1992 (age 34) Novy Urengoy, Yamalo-Nenets Autonomous Okrug, Russia

Sport
- Country: Russia
- Sport: Modern pentathlon
Medal record
World Championships
Gold medal – first place	2017 Cairo	Individual
Gold medal – first place	2021 Cairo	Relay
Silver medal – second place	2017 Cairo	Team
European Championships
Gold medal – first place	2017 Minsk	Mixed
Silver medal – second place	2016 Sofia	Individual
Silver medal – second place	2021 Nizhny Novgorod	Team
Bronze medal – third place	2016 Sofia	Team
Summer Youth Olympics
Bronze medal – third place	2010 Singapore	Mixed
Military World Games
Silver medal – second place	2019 Wuhan	Individual
Silver medal – second place	2019 Wuhan	Team

Gulnaz Radikovna Gubaydullina (Russian: Гульназ Радиковна Губайдуллина, Tatar: Гөлназ Радик кызы Гобәйдуллина; born 14 February 1992) is a Russian modern pentathlete. She has qualified for the 2016 Summer Olympics. At the 2017 World Modern Pentathlon Championships, Gubaydullina won the gold medal in the individual competition, becoming the second Russian woman to do so (the other being Elizaveta Suvorova in 1997).

== Biography ==
Gubaydullina was born to a Bashkir father and a Tatar mother. She started swimming in Novy Urengoy at the age of six. When she was thirteen, she participated in the double-event, winning gold in a local tournament. Gubaydullina is a four-times junior and youth European champion, and a world youth silver medalist. She is a bronze medalist in the mixed event at the 2010 Summer Youth Olympics.

The Russian became fourth at the 2015 European Modern Pentathlon Championships, giving her a place at the 2016 Summer Olympics. Although Gubaydullina set a new record in 200 m swimming (2:07.94) at the Olympics, she finished just 15th (following the disqualification of Chen Qian she took the 14th position).

Gubaydullina and Belyakov won the mixed event of the 2017 European Modern Pentathlon Championships in Minsk, Belarus.

At the 2020 Summer Olympics held in Tokyo, Japan in 2021, Gubaydullina started off by showing the best result in swimming, setting an Olympic Record (2:07.31). However, she was eliminated in the third stage, after her randomly assigned horse 'Saint Boy' refused to continue jumping, leaving her without a medal at the end, although having the 6th best time in the final stage.

She won the 2021 Cup of the President of the Russian Federation (former Kremlin Cup), after winning the fencing, swimming and the final laser run stages.
