= Ahmed Hamed =

Egyptian modern pentathlete

Personal information
- Nationality: Egyptian
- Born: 1 June 1997 (age 29) Cairo
- Height: 176

Sport
- Sport: Modern pentathlon
Medal record
Men's modern pentathlon
Representing Egypt
World Championships
Gold medal – first place	2017 Cairo	Team
Gold medal – first place	2023 Bath	Relay
Silver medal – second place	2022 Alexandria	Relay
Bronze medal – third place	2021 Cairo	Team

Ahmed Hamed (born 1 June 1997) is an Egyptian modern pentathlete. He competed in the men's event at the 2020 Summer Olympics.
