= Ronja Steinborn =

German modern pentathlete

Personal information
- Nationality: German
- Born: 23 December 1990 (age 35) Berlin, Germany

Sport
- Country: Germany
- Sport: Modern pentathlon
Medal record
World Championships
| Gold medal – first place | 2017 Cairo | Mixed relay |
| Silver medal – second place | 2018 Mexico City | Relay |

Ronja Steinborn (born 23 December 1990) is a German modern pentathlete.

She participated at the 2018 World Modern Pentathlon Championships, winning a medal.
