= 2006 World Modern Pentathlon Championships =

World morden penthathlon

2006 World Championships
- Location: Guatemala City, Guatemala
- Dates: 18–20 November

The 2006 World Modern Pentathlon Championships were held in Guatemala City, Guatemala from November 18 to November 20.

== Medal summary ==
=== Men's events ===
Event	(gold) Gold	(silver) Silver	(bronze) Bronze
Individual	Edvinas Krungolcas (LTU)	Viktor Horváth (HUN)	Andrejus Zadneprovskis (LTU)
Team	Lithuania; Tadas Zemaitis; Edvinas Krungolcas; Andrejus Zadneprovskis	Hungary; Viktor Horváth; Sándor Fülep; Ákos Kállai	Czech Republic; Libor Capalini; Michal Michalik; Michal Sedlecký
Relay	Hungary; Viktor Horváth; Sándor Fülep; Ákos Kállai	Belarus; Igor Lapo; Mikhail Prokopenko; Dmitriy Meliakh	China; Cao Zhongrong; Qian Zhenhua; Liu Yanli

=== Women's events ===
Event	(gold) Gold	(silver) Silver	(bronze) Bronze
Individual	Marta Dziadura (POL)	Victoria Tereshchuk (UKR)	Omnia Fakhry (EGY)
Team	Poland; Sylvia Czwojdzinska; Paulina Boenisz; Marta Dziadura	Great Britain; Georgina Harland; Mhairi Spence; Katie Livingston	Hungary; Zsuzsanna Vörös; Csilla Füri; Vivien Máthé
Relay	Poland; Sylvia Czwojdzinska; Paulina Boenisz; Marta Dziadura	Great Britain; Georgina Harland; Mhairi Spence; Katie Livingston	Russia; Lyudmila Sirotkina; Tatyana Muratova; Polina Struchkova

== See also ==
- Modern Pentathlon at the 2008 Summer Olympics
- World Modern Pentathlon Championship
