= Tamara Alekszejev =

Hungarian modern pentathlete (born 1988)

Personal information
- Nationality: Hungarian
- Born: 21 October 1988 (age 37)

Sport
- Country: Hungary
- Sport: Modern pentathlon
Medal record
World Championships
Gold medal – first place	2016 Moscow	Team
Gold medal – first place	2017 Cairo	Team
Gold medal – first place	2018 Mexico City	Team
Silver medal – second place	2021 Cairo	Team
Bronze medal – third place	2015 Berlin	Team
European Championships
Gold medal – first place	2018 Székesfehérvár	Team
Silver medal – second place	2017 Minsk	Team
Bronze medal – third place	2016 Sofia	Relay

Tamara Alekszejev (born 21 October 1988) is a Hungarian modern pentathlete.

She participated at the 2018 World Modern Pentathlon Championships, winning a medal.
