= Erik Johansson (pentathlete) =

Swedish modern pentathlete (born 1974)

Personal information
- Nationality: Swedish
- Born: 29 October 1974 (age 51) Uppsala, Sweden

Sport
- Sport: Modern pentathlon

Erik Johansson (born 29 October 1974) is a Swedish former modern pentathlete. He competed in the men's individual event at the 2004 Summer Olympics.
