= Caroline Delemer =

French modern pentathlete

Personal information
- Born: 11 March 1965 (age 60)

Sport
- Country: France
- Sport: Modern pentathlon

Caroline Delemer (born 11 March 1965) is a French modern pentathlete. She represented France at the 2000 Summer Olympics held in Sydney, Australia in the women's modern pentathlon and she finished in 10th place.
