= Mhairi Spence =

British modern pentathlete (born 1985)

Personal information
- Nickname: "Fencey" Spence
- Nationality: British
- Born: 31 August 1985 (age 40) Inverness, Scotland
- Height: 1.71 m (5 ft 7 in)
- Weight: 70 kg (154 lb)

Sport
- Country: Great Britain; Scotland
- Sport: Modern Pentathlon
Medal record
Women's modern pentathlon
Representing Great Britain
World Championships
Gold medal – first place	2007 Berlin	Relay
Gold medal – first place	2012 Rome	Individual
Gold medal – first place	2012 Rome	Team
Gold medal – first place	2013 Kaoshiung	Team
Silver medal – second place	2006 Guatemala	Team
Silver medal – second place	2006 Guatemala	Relay
Silver medal – second place	2008 Budapest	Team
Silver medal – second place	2008 Budapest	Relay
Silver medal – second place	2009 London	Team
European Championships
Silver medal – second place	2009 Leipzig	Team
Bronze medal – third place	2006 Budapest	Individual
World Modern Pentathlon Junior Championships
Silver medal – second place	2006 Shanghai	Individual
Bronze medal – third place	2005 Moscow	Individual
Junior European Championships
Silver medal – second place	2006 Torres Vedras	Individual
Women's fencing
Commonwealth Fencing Championships
Bronze medal – third place	2006 Belfast	Epee

Mhairi Spence (born 31 August 1985) is a British modern pentathlete. She has won a series of medals at European and World Championships, but was not selected for the 2008 Summer Olympics by the British team due to the limited number of places available. After considering retiring in 2009, she returned to the sport and in 2012 she won gold medals in both the individual and the team events at the 2012 World Championships, and qualified to be chosen for the 2012 Summer Olympics.

== Early life ==
Mhairi Spence was born in Inverness, Scotland, on 31 August 1985. She was a member of the Pony Club at an early age, competing in Tetrathlon from the age of ten. She was inspired to change disciplines by the British athletes competing in women's Modern Pentathlon when it made its début at the 2000 Summer Olympics in Sydney. She graduated from the University of Bath with a degree in Coach Education and Sports Development.

== Career ==
After seeing the 2000 Summer Olympics, she began training in fencing so that she could switch disciplines to Modern Pentathlon. After four weeks in the new sport, she won her class at the British Youth Championships. She competed at the 2006 Commonwealth Fencing Championships for Scotland, where she won the bronze medal. Women's Modern Pentathlon features five events, first fencing, then swimming, showjumping, and finally a discipline combining running and pistol shooting. She considers fencing to be her favourite discipline of Modern Pentathlon.

To qualify for an Olympic Games in Modern Pentathlon, athletes must reach a minimum standard. Prior to the 2008 Summer Olympics, Spence met the standard required to qualify for the Games, but as there are only two spots in each team for the sport she wasn't selected for the British team, Heather Fell and Katy Livingston were chosen instead. In 2009, she contemplated retiring from the sport, and returned to the family home in Scotland but following an early morning run in sub-zero temperatures, she decided she still had the passion to compete. She finished 3rd (or Bronze) at the 2011 World Modern Pentathlon World Cup. She finished in eight place at the 2011 World Modern Pentathlon Championships. At the first World Cup event of 2012, held in Charlotte, North Carolina, she took the silver medal in second place. She was leading going into the final event, the run/shoot discipline, but was overtaken by Lena Schoneborn, the reigning Olympic champion.

She entered the 2012 World Modern Pentathlon Championships ranked in 5th place in the world rankings. She achieved the gold medal position coming from 37 seconds behind the leader in the final discipline, becoming the first British woman to win the individual gold at the Pentathlon World Championships since Steph Cook in 2001. That result, combined with the bronze medal won by Samantha Murray and a 15th-place finish by Heather Fell resulted in the three athletes also winning the women's team gold medal as well.

Following her gold medal at the 2012 World Championships, she was considered one of the favourites to be chosen for one of the two spots for the women's Pentathlon in the British team for the 2012 Summer Olympics along with Samantha Murray. Due to her placing at the Championships, she was deemed to have met the minimum standard required to compete at the Games, along with Murray and Freyja Prentice who qualified at the 2011 European Championships. She has described qualifying for an Olympic Games as a lifelong dream, saying "When I think about it I get goosebumps. I feel quite emotional about the idea of hopefully standing on that start line." Prior to the 2012 Summer Olympics, she is ranked 4th in the world, the highest-ranked British athlete. Her selection as part of the British team at the 2012 Games was announced on 8 June.

== Personal life ==
She has an ambition to be the host of the BBC One sports quiz show A Question of Sport. She trains at the University of Bath.
