= Dorota Idzi =

Polish modern pentathlete

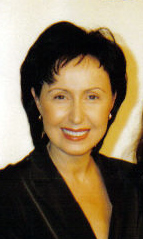

Personal information
- Nationality: Polish
- Born: 8 May 1966 (age 59)

Sport
- Sport: Modern pentathlon

Dorota Idzi (born 8 May 1966) is a Polish modern pentathlete. She competed in women's modern pentathlon at the 2000 Summer Olympics in Sydney.
