= Uliana Batashova =

Russian modern pentathlete (born 1994)

Personal information
- National team: Russia
- Born: 16 August 1994 (age 31) Oktyabrsky, Bashkortostan, Russia

Sport
- Country: Russia
- Sport: Modern pentathlon
Medal record
World Championships
Silver medal – second place	2017 Cairo	Team
Silver medal – second place	2021 Cairo	Relay
European Championships
Bronze medal – third place	2021 Nizhny Novgorod	Relay

Uliana Igorevna Batashova (Russian: Ульяна Игоревна Баташова; born 16 August 1994) is a Russian modern pentathlete. She is a two-time silver medalist of the World Modern Pentathlon Championships. Batashova ranked second in the Women Senior Pentathlon World Cup Ranking on 27 May 2019.

Bathashova participated at the 2020 Summer Olympics, which took place in Tokyo, Japan in 2020. She led after the riding competition, but finished ninth in the final laser run stage.
