= Yelizaveta Suvorova =

Russian modern pentathlete

Personal information
- Native name: Елизавета Михайловна Суворова
- Full name: Yelizaveta Mikhaylovna Suvorova
- Born: 21 April 1975 (age 51) Moscow, Soviet Union

Sport
- Country: Russia
- Sport: Modern pentathlon

Yelizaveta Mikhaylovna Suvorova (Russian: Елизавета Михайловна Суворова; born 21 April 1975) is a Russian modern pentathlete. She represented Russia at the 2000 Summer Olympics held in Sydney, Australia in the women's modern pentathlon and she finished in 7th place.
