= Stefan Köllner =

German modern pentathlete

Personal information
- Born: 11 September 1984 (age 41) Potsdam, East Germany

Sport
- Sport: Modern pentathlon
Medal record
Men's modern pentathlon
Representing Germany
World Championships
Silver medal – second place	2012 Rome	Relay

Stefan Köllner (born 11 September 1984) is a German modern pentathlete. He competed at the 2012 Summer Olympics.
