= Gábor Balogh =

Hungarian modern pentathlete (born 1976)

Personal information
- Nationality: Hungary
- Born: 5 August 1976 (age 49) Budapest, Hungary
- Height: 1.87 m (6 ft 2 in)
- Weight: 75 kg (165 lb)

Sport
- Club: Honvéd-Steffl
- Retired: 2008

Achievements and titles
- Personal best: 5640 pts
Medal record
Men's modern pentathlon
Representing Hungary
Olympic Games
Silver medal – second place	2000 Sydney	Individual
World Championships
Gold medal – first place	1999 Budapest	Individual
Gold medal – first place	1999 Budapest	Team
Gold medal – first place	1999 Budapest	Relay
Gold medal – first place	2001 Millfield	Individual
Gold medal – first place	2001 Millfield	Team
Gold medal – first place	2002 San Francisco	Team
Gold medal – first place	2003 Pesaro	Team
Gold medal – first place	2003 Pesaro	Relay
Silver medal – second place	1998 Mexico City	Team
Silver medal – second place	2000 Pesaro	Individual
Silver medal – second place	2006 Guatemala City	Team
Bronze medal – third place	2007 Berlin	Team
European Championships
Gold medal – first place	1997 Székesfehérvár	Relay
Gold medal – first place	1999 Drzonków	Team
Gold medal – first place	1999 Drzonków	Relay
Gold medal – first place	2000 Székesfehérvár	Relay
Gold medal – first place	2001 Sofia	Team
Gold medal – first place	2002 Ústí nad Labem	Team
Gold medal – first place	2005 Montepulciano	Team
Gold medal – first place	2005 Montepulciano	Relay
Gold medal – first place	2006 Budapest	Individual
Gold medal – first place	2006 Budapest	Team
Silver medal – second place	1998 Uppsala	Team
Silver medal – second place	2003 Ústí nad Labem	Team
Silver medal – second place	2007 Riga	Team
Bronze medal – third place	2002 Ústí nad Labem	Individual

Gábor Balogh (born 5 August 1976 in Budapest, Hungary) is a former Hungarian modern pentathlete who won a silver medal at the 2000 Summer Olympics in Sydney, Australia.

He was elected Hungarian Sportsman of the Year in 1999 and 2001 for winning gold medals at the World and European Championships.

Awards
Preceded by Tibor Gécsek	Hungarian Sportsman of The Year; 1999	Succeeded by Szilveszter Csollány
Preceded by Szilveszter Csollány	Hungarian Sportsman of The Year; 2001	Succeeded by Szilveszter Csollány
