= Justinas Kinderis =

Lithuanian modern pentathlete (born 1987)

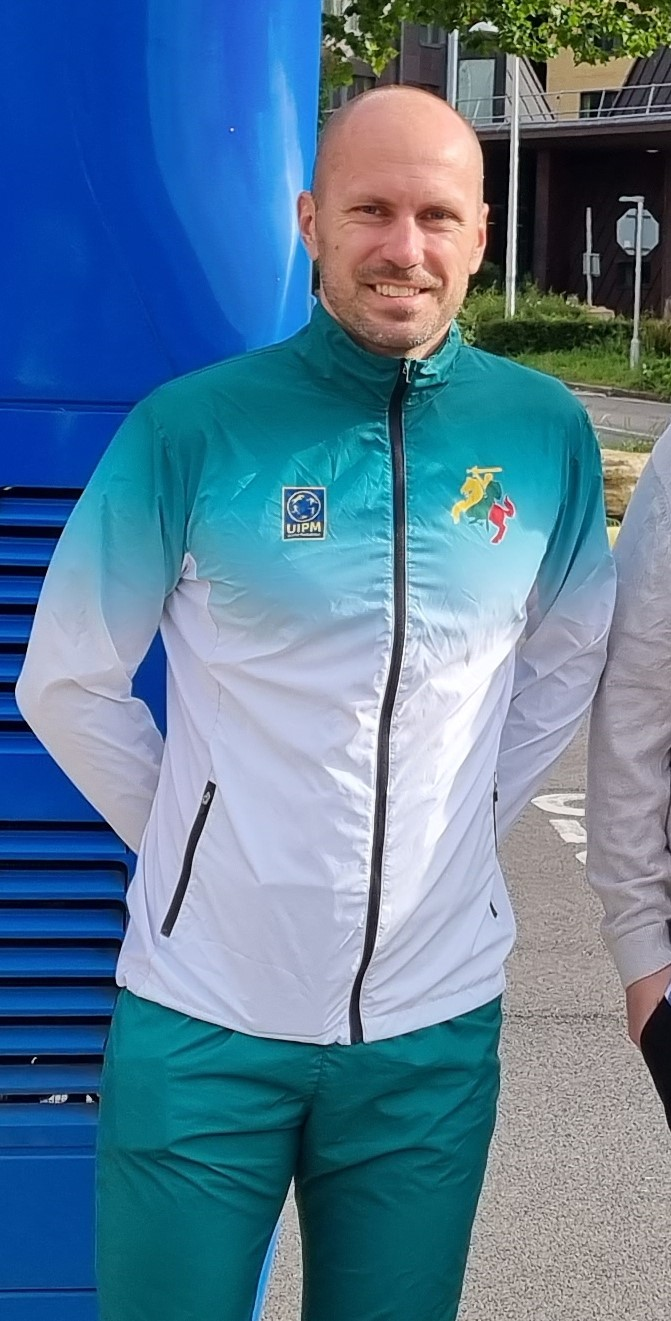
- Justinas Kinderis at the 2023 World Championships

Personal information
- Born: May 24, 1987 (age 39)
- Height: 1.84 m (6 ft 1/2 in)
- Weight: 82 kg (181 lb)

Sport
- Country: Lithuania
- Sport: Athletics
- Event: Modern Pentathlon
- Coached by: Jurijus Moskviciovas
Medal record
Men's modern pentathlon
Representing Lithuania
World Championships
Gold medal – first place	2010 Chengdu	Team
Gold medal – first place	2013 Kaohsiung	Individual
Gold medal – first place	2014 Warsaw	Mixed
Silver medal – second place	2008 Budapest	Relay
Bronze medal – third place	2009 London	Team
Bronze medal – third place	2010 Chengdu	Individual
Bronze medal – third place	2017 Cairo	Individual
European Championships
Gold medal – first place	2009 Leipzig	Relay
Gold medal – first place	2009 Leipzig	Team
Gold medal – first place	2014 Székesfehérvár	Mixed
Silver medal – second place	2007 Riga	Relay
Silver medal – second place	2007 Moscow	Relay
Silver medal – second place	2012 Sofia	Mixed
Silver medal – second place	2021 Nizhny Novgorod	Mixed
Bronze medal – third place	2010 Debrecen	Relay
Bronze medal – third place	2010 Debrecen	Team
Bronze medal – third place	2013 Drzonków	Mixed
- Updated on 4 August 2012

Justinas Kinderis (born 24 May 1987, Panevėžys) is a male Lithuanian modern pentathlete who won a bronze medal at 2010 World Modern Pentathlon Championships. He competed at the 2012 Summer Olympics in the Modern pentathlon. At the 2014 World Championships, he won the mixed relay with Laura Asadauskaité.

At the 2021 Lithuanian Fencing Championships Justinas become national champion in fencing.

Justinas participated at the 2020 Tokyo Olympics and finished 18 in Modern pentathlon.
