= 2015 World Modern Pentathlon Championships =

International sporting event

2015 World Championships
- Location: Berlin, Germany
- Dates: 28 June–6 July

The 2015 World Modern Pentathlon Championships was held in Berlin, Germany from 28 June to 6 July 2015. The event included pistol shooting, fencing, 200m swimming, show jumping and a 3 km run.

== Medal summary ==
=== Men's events ===
Event	Gold	Silver	Bronze
Individual	Pavlo Tymoshchenko (UKR)	Aleksander Lesun (RUS)	Andriy Fedechko (UKR)
Team^{[a]}	South Korea; Jun Woong-tae; Jung Jin-hwa; Lee Woo-jin	Poland; Michał Gralewski; Sebastian Stasiak; Jarosław Świderski	Ukraine; Dmytro Kirpulyanskyy; Denys Pavlyuk; Pavlo Tymoshchenko
Relay	Germany; Marvin Faly Dogue; Alexander Nobis	Russia; Alexander Kukarin; Kirill Belyakov	Poland; Szymon Staśkiewicz; Jarosław Świderski

=== Women's events ===
Event	Gold	Silver	Bronze
Individual	Lena Schöneborn (GER)	Chen Qian (CHN)	Yane Marques (BRA)
Team	Poland; Anna Maliszewska; Aleksandra Skarzyńska; Oktawia Nowacka	Germany; Annika Schleu; Lena Schöneborn; Janine Kohlmann	Hungary; Sarolta Kovács; Zsófia Földházi; Tamara Alekszejev
Relay	China; Chen Qian; Liang Wanxia	Lithuania; Lina Batulevičiūtė; Ieva Serapinaitė	Poland; Aleksandra Skarzyńska; Oktawia Nowacka

=== Mixed events ===
Event	Gold	Silver	Bronze
Relay^{[b]}	Czech Republic; Jan Kuf; Natalie Dianová	United States; Nathan Schrimsher; Margaux Isaksen	Ireland; Arthur Lanigan-O'Keeffe; Natalya Coyle

- ^{Men's team} Russian team originally won silver medals but was disqualified due to anti-doping rules violation by Maksim Kustov.
- ^{Mixed relay} Russian team originally won silver medals but was disqualified due to anti-doping rules violation by Maksim Kustov.

== Medal table ==
* Host nation (Germany)

Rank	Nation	Gold	Silver	Bronze	Total
1	Germany (GER)*	2	1	0	3
2	Poland (POL)	1	1	2	4
3	China (CHN)	1	1	0	2
4	Ukraine (UKR)	1	0	2	3
5	Czech Republic (CZE)	1	0	0	1
5	South Korea (KOR)	1	0	0	1
7	Russia (RUS)	0	2	0	2
8	Lithuania (LTU)	0	1	0	1
8	United States (USA)	0	1	0	1
10	Brazil (BRA)	0	0	1	1
10	Hungary (HUN)	0	0	1	1
10	Ireland (IRL)	0	0	1	1
Totals (12 entries)		7	7	7	21

== See also ==
- Union Internationale de Pentathlon Moderne (UIPM)
