= Róbert Kasza =

Hungarian modern pentathlete

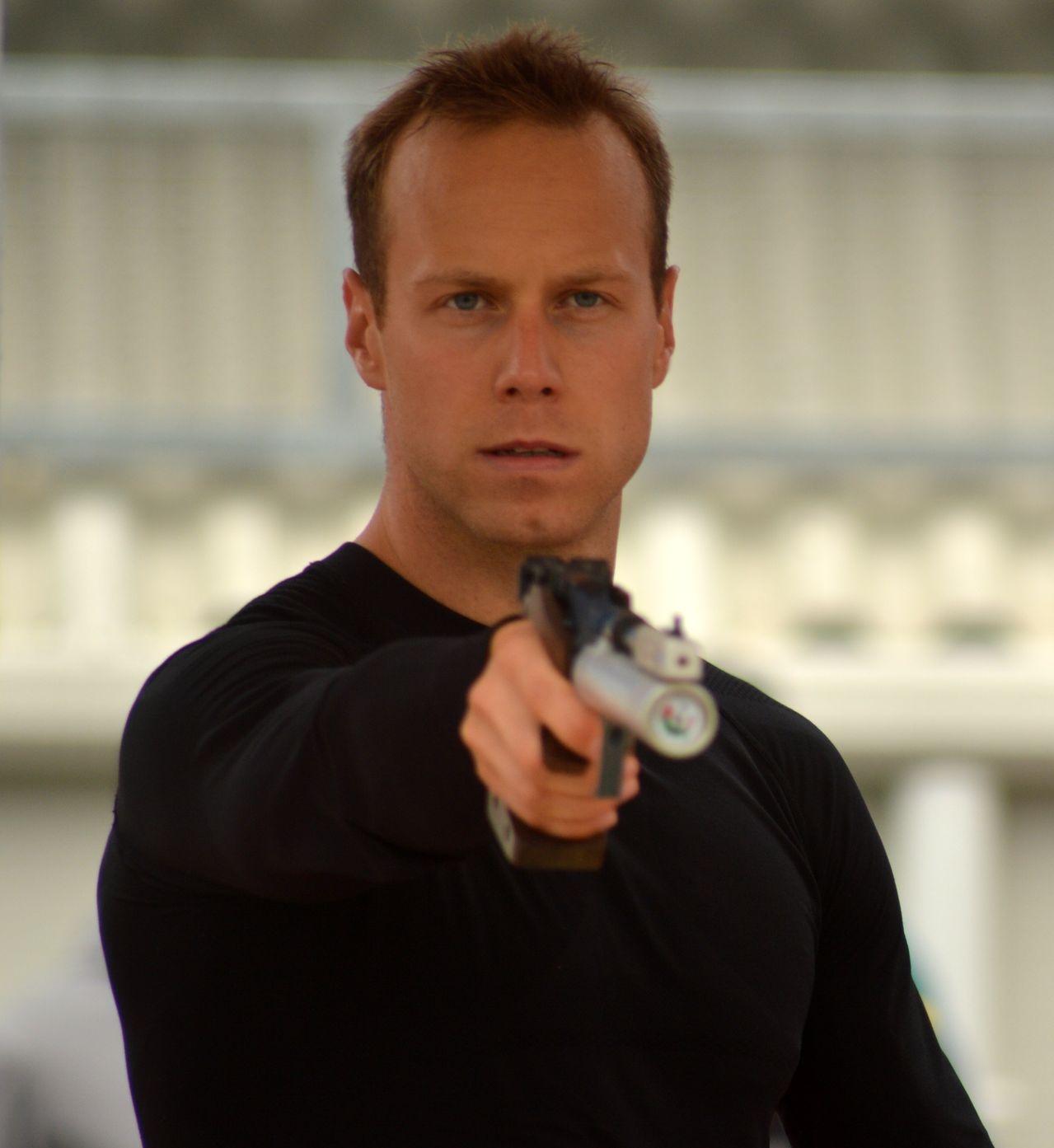

Personal information
- Born: 5 April 1986 (age 40) Budapest, Hungary
- Height: 1.8 m (5 ft 11 in)
- Weight: 71 kg (157 lb)

Sport
- Country: Hungary
- Sport: Modern Pentathlon
- Coached by: Peter Takacs (fencing); Edit Cornides (swimming); Gyula Karacsony (shooting); Akos Schumacher (running); Zsolt Balaka (riding)
Medal record
Men's modern pentathlon
Representing Hungary
World Championships
Gold medal – first place	2014 Warsaw	Team
Gold medal – first place	2013 Kaohsiung	Relay
Gold medal – first place	2011 Moscow	Relay
Silver medal – second place	2017 Cairo	Individual
Silver medal – second place	2011 Moscow	Team
Bronze medal – third place	2010 Chengdu	Team
- Updated on 17 March 2018

Róbert Kasza (born 5 April 1986 in Budapest) is a Hungarian modern pentathlete. He was on the gold medal-winning relay team at the 2011 World Modern Pentathlon Championships. He also qualified for and participated in the modern pentathlon at the 2012 Summer Olympics. Robert Kasza is represented by STRONGAA Management.
