= Bence Demeter =

Hungarian modern pentathlete (born 1990)

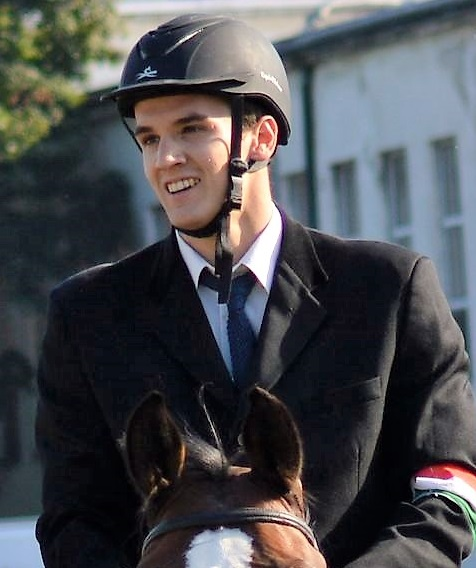
- Demeter in 2014

Personal information
- Born: 19 March 1990 (age 36)

Sport
- Country: Hungary
- Sport: Modern pentathlon
Medal record
Men's modern pentathlon
Representing Hungary
World Championships
Gold medal – first place	2013 Kaohsiung	Relay
Gold medal – first place	2014 Warsaw	Team
Gold medal – first place	2021 Cairo	Team
Gold medal – first place	2024 Zhengzhou	Team
Silver medal – second place	2011 Moscow	Team
Silver medal – second place	2019 Budapest	Team
Silver medal – second place	2022 Alexandria	Team
European Championships
Gold medal – first place	2011 Medway	Relay
Gold medal – first place	2013 Drzonków	Team
Gold medal – first place	2014 Székesfehérvár	Team
Gold medal – first place	2017 Minsk	Team
Gold medal – first place	2021 Nizhny Novgorod	Team
Gold medal – first place	2022 Székesfehérvár	Team
Silver medal – second place	2012 Sofia	Team
Silver medal – second place	2018 Székesfehérvár	Team
Bronze medal – third place	2012 Sofia	Individual
Bronze medal – third place	2018 Székesfehérvár	Mixed
Bronze medal – third place	2021 Nizhny Novgorod	Individual

Bence Demeter (born 19 March 1990) is a Hungarian modern pentathlete. He competed at the 2016 Summer Olympics in Rio de Janeiro, in the men's event.
