= Zsófia Földházi =

Hungarian modern pentathlete

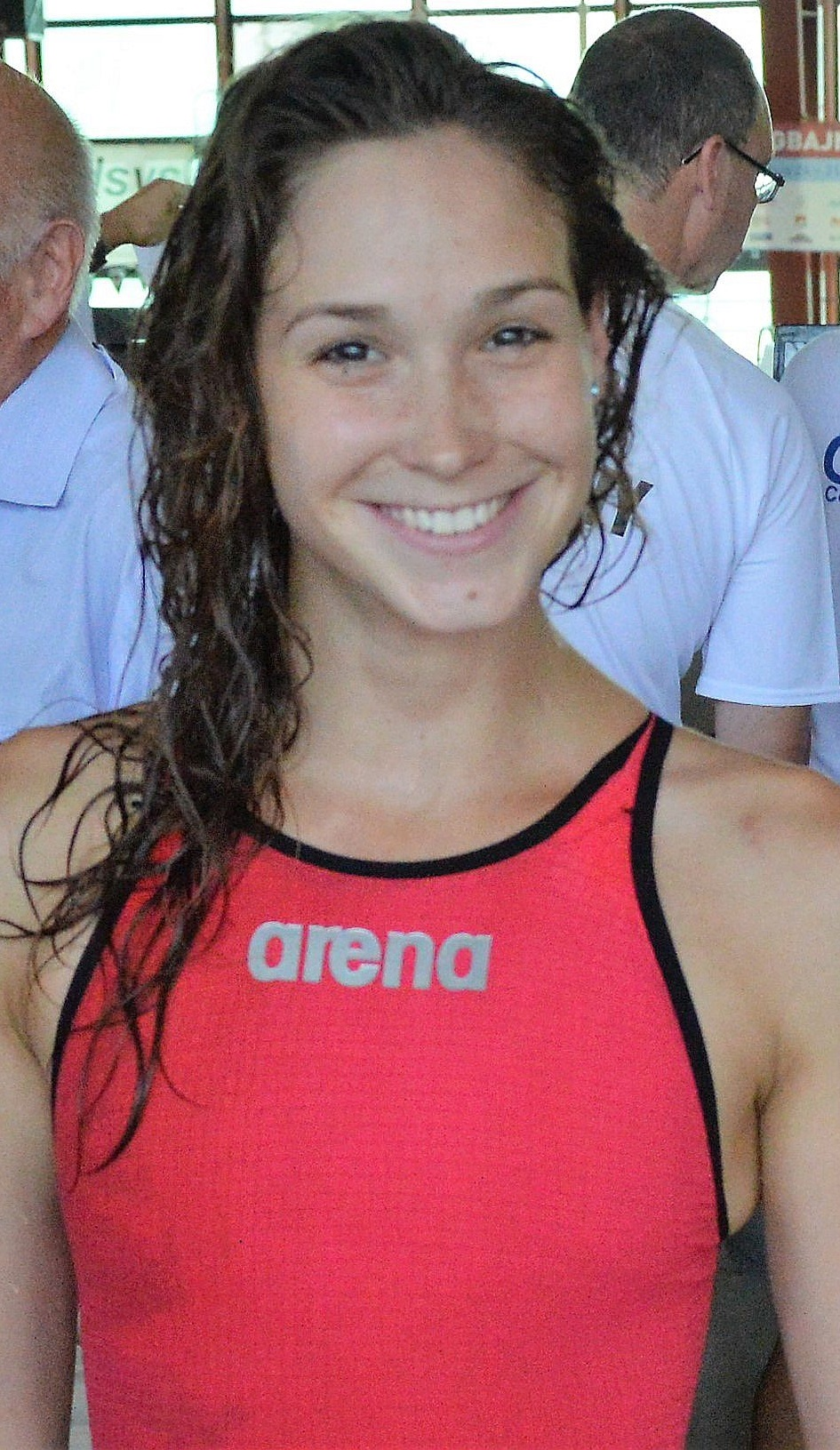

Personal information
- Nationality: Hungarian
- Born: 9 June 1993 (age 33) Budapest, Hungary
- Height: 170 cm (5 ft 7 in)
- Weight: 53 kg (117 lb)

Sport
- Country: Hungary
- Sport: Modern pentathlon
Medal record
Women's modern pentathlon
Representing Hungary
World Championships
Gold medal – first place	2016 Moscow	Team
Gold medal – first place	2018 Mexico City	Team
Silver medal – second place	2013 Kaohsiung	Team
Silver medal – second place	2017 Cairo	Individual
Bronze medal – third place	2015 Berlin	Team
European Championships
Gold medal – first place	2013 Drzonków	Individual
Gold medal – first place	2018 Székesfehérvár	Team
Silver medal – second place	2017 Minsk	Team
Summer Youth Olympics
Silver medal – second place	2010 Singapore	Individual

Zsófia Földházi (Hungarian: [ˈʒoːfiɒ ˈfølthaːzi]; born 9 June 1993) is a Hungarian modern pentathlete. She has qualified for the 2016 Summer Olympics.
