= Ondřej Polívka =

Czech modern pentathlete (born 1988)

Personal information
- Nickname: Poliv
- Nationality: Czech Republic
- Born: 17 March 1988 (age 38) Prague, Czechoslovakia
- Height: 1.86 m (6 ft 1 in)
- Weight: 80 kg (176 lb)

Sport
- Sport: Modern pentathlon
- Club: ASC Dukla Praha
- Coached by: Jakub Kucera
Medal record
Men's modern pentathlon
Representing Czech Republic
World Championships
Gold medal – first place	2009 London	Team
Silver medal – second place	2009 London	Relay
Bronze medal – third place	2007 Berlin	Relay
European Championships
Gold medal – first place	2009 Leipzig	Individual
Silver medal – second place	2009 Leipzig	Team
Bronze medal – third place	2009 Leipzig	Relay
Bronze medal – third place	2019 Bath	Team

Ondřej Polívka (born 17 May 1988 in Prague) is a modern pentathlete from the Czech Republic. He competed at the 2012 Summer Olympics in London, England, along with his teammates David Svoboda, who eventually won a gold medal in the men's event, and his girlfriend Natálie Dianová in the women's event. During the men's competition, Polívka made a disastrous start, with a disappointing score in one-touch épée fencing, but managed to keep his pace in swimming and horse-riding. His best competition result happened in a first ever combined running and pistol shooting, where he set two Olympic records for hitting five shots each in three sessions, with a score of 33.6 target points. Polívka finished the last segment in fourth place, despite his staggered start with a handicapped time and his accomplishment in laser pistol; however, he finished the event only in fifteenth place.

In his sporting career, Polívka took part in several modern pentathlon competitions, and won medals at the World and European Championships. He also led his strong Czech team, including Svoboda and Michal Michalík to claim both gold and silver medals at the 2009 World Modern Pentathlon Championships in London.

Awards
Preceded by Lukáš Krpálek	Czech Junior Athlete of the Year; 2009	Succeeded by Tomáš Paprstka
Preceded by Martina Sáblíková	Czech Junior Athlete of the Year; 2007	Succeeded by Lukáš Krpálek
