= Zsuzsanna Vörös =

Hungarian modern pentathlete

Medal record

Women's modern pentathlon

Representing Hungary

Olympic Games
| Gold medal – first place | 2004 Athens | Individual |

World Championship
| Gold medal – first place | 1999 Budapest | Individual |
| Gold medal – first place | 2000 Pesaro | Relay |
| Gold medal – first place | 2002 San Francisco | Team |
| Gold medal – first place | 2003 Pesaro | Individual |
| Gold medal – first place | 2003 Pesaro | Relay |
| Gold medal – first place | 2004 Moscow | Individual |
| Silver medal – second place | 1998 Mexico City | Individual |
| Silver medal – second place | 2002 San Francisco | Individual |
| Silver medal – second place | 2005 Warsaw | Individual |
| Silver medal – second place | 2005 Warsaw | Team |
| Bronze medal – third place | 1998 Mexico City | Team |
| Bronze medal – third place | 2002 San Francisco | Relay |
| Bronze medal – third place | 2003 Pesaro | Team |
| Bronze medal – third place | 2006 Guatemala City | Team |
| Bronze medal – third place | 2008 Budapest | Team |
| Bronze medal – third place | 2009 London | Team |

European Championship
| Gold medal – first place | 2000 Székesfehérvár | Individual |
| Gold medal – first place | 2000 Székesfehérvár | Team |
| Gold medal – first place | 2001 Sofia | Relay |
| Gold medal – first place | 2003 Ustí nad Labem | Team |
| Gold medal – first place | 2003 Ustí nad Labem | Relay |
| Gold medal – first place | 2006 Budapest | Individual |
| Silver medal – second place | 2003 Ustí nad Labem | Individual |
| Silver medal – second place | 2004 Albena | Relay |
| Silver medal – second place | 2005 Montepulciano | Relay |
| Silver medal – second place | 2008 Moscow | Relay |
| Bronze medal – third place | 1997 Moscow | Relay |
| Bronze medal – third place | 2007 Riga | Relay |
| Bronze medal – third place | 2009 Leipzig | Team |

Zsuzsanna Vörös (born 4 May 1977 in Székesfehérvár) is a retired Hungarian modern pentathlete who won a gold medal at the 2004 Summer Olympics in Athens, Greece. Her score of 5448 is broken down as follows:

- Shooting—1120
- Fencing—916
- Swimming—1296
- Riding—1124
- Running—992

She won gold medals for the individual event at the World Modern Pentathlon Championships in 1999, 2003 and 2004, with scores of 5319, 5604 and 5624 respectively.

== Awards and recognition ==
- Knight's Cross of the Order of Merit of the Republic of Hungary: 2004
- Honorary Citizen of Székesfehérvár: 2004
- SportStars Award: 2004
- Hungarian Sportswoman of The Year: 2005

Awards
| Preceded by Nataša Janić | Hungarian Sportswoman of The Year; 2005 | Succeeded by Tímea Nagy |
