= Cao Zhongrong =

Chinese modern pentathlete (born 1981)

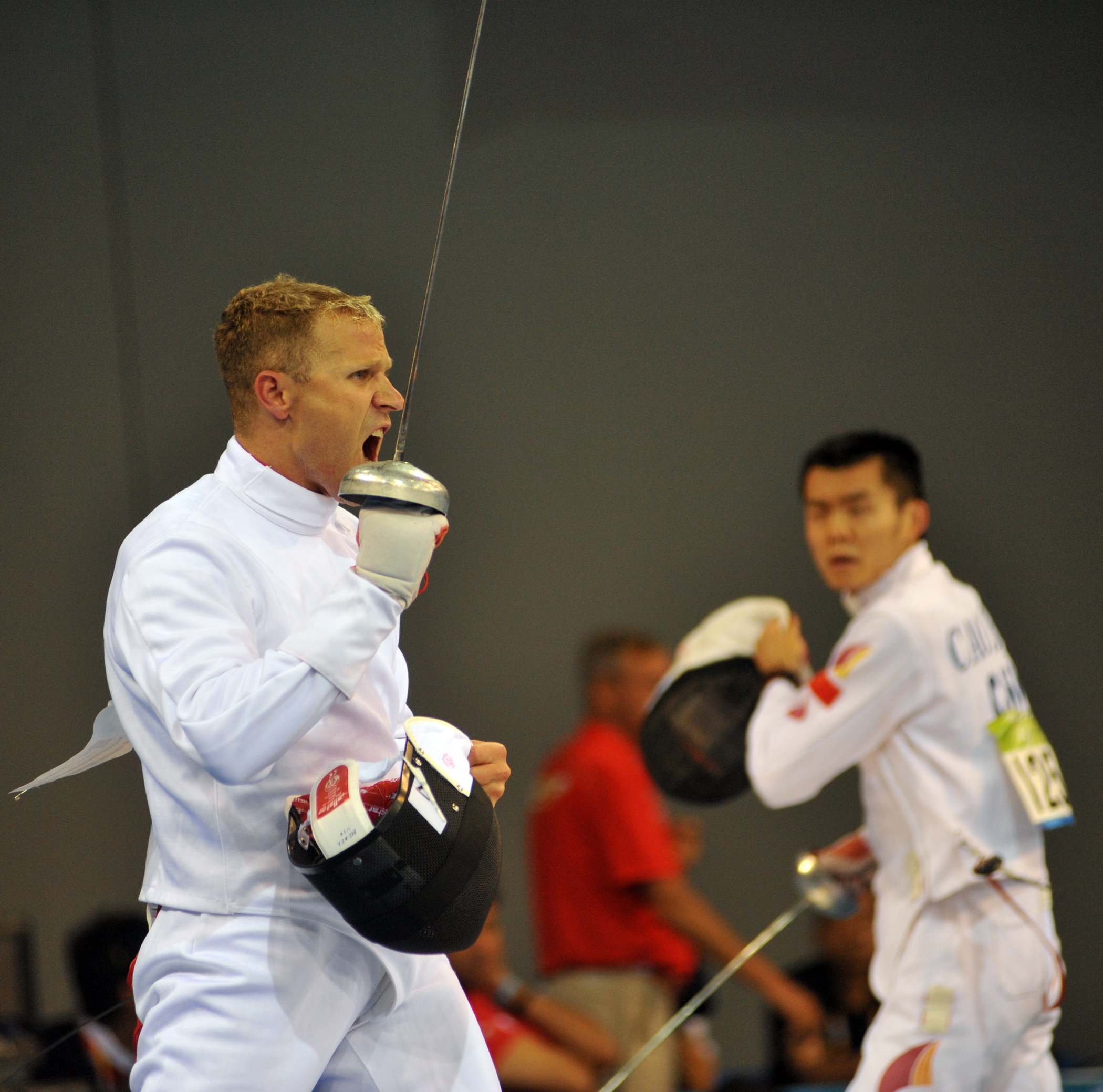
- Cao Zhongrong (right) v. Eli Bremer

Personal information
- Born: November 3, 1981 (age 44)
- Height: 1.8 m (5 ft 11 in)
- Weight: 73 kg (161 lb)

Sport
- Country: China
- Sport: Modern Pentathlon
- Coached by: Zhang Bin; Gong JiXiang
Medal record
Men's modern pentathlon
Representing China
Olympic Games
Silver medal – second place	2012 London	Individual
World Championships
Silver medal – second place	2007 Berlin	Relay
Bronze medal – third place	2006 Guatemala City	Relay
Bronze medal – third place	2012 Rome	Mixed Relay
Asian Games
Gold medal – first place	2010 Guangzhou	Individual
Silver medal – second place	2010 Guangzhou	Team
- Updated on 24 August 2012

Cao Zhongrong (Chinese: 曹忠荣; pinyin: Cáo Zhōngróng; born 3 November 1981 in Shanghai) is a male Chinese modern pentathlete who competed in the 2008 and 2012 Summer Olympics. He finished in 30th place in 2008, and won the silver medal in 2012.

His personal best is coming in 1st at the 2006 World Cup and 1st at the 2010 Asian Games.
