= Chen Qian (pentathlete) =

Chinese modern pentathlete

Personal information
- Born: January 14, 1987 (age 39)
- Height: 1.63 m (5 ft 4 in)
- Weight: 54 kg (119 lb)

Sport
- Country: China
- Sport: Modern Pentathlon
- Coached by: Wang Ke
Medal record
Women's modern pentathlon
Representing China
World Championships
Gold medal – first place	2009 London	Individual
Gold medal – first place	2014 Warsaw	Relay
Gold medal – first place	2015 Berlin	Relay
Silver medal – second place	2012 Rome	Individual
Silver medal – second place	2012 Rome	Relay
Silver medal – second place	2015 Berlin	Individual
Silver medal – second place	2016 Moscow	Team
Bronze medal – third place	2010 Chengdu	Relay
Bronze medal – third place	2012 Rome	Team
- Updated on 27 May 2016

Chen Qian (simplified Chinese: 陈倩; traditional Chinese: 陳倩; pinyin: Chén Qiàn; born 14 January 1987 in Suzhou, Jiangsu) is a female Chinese modern pentathlete who competed in the 2008 Summer Olympics in Beijing and the 2012 Summer Olympics in London finishing in 5th place on both occasions.

She won the gold medal in the individual event at the 2009 World Modern Pentathlon Championships.

She competed in the 2016 Summer Olympics coming in fourth place. However Chen was disqualified for doping. She was suspended for 4 years and retired from the sport
