= Michal Michalík =

Czech modern pentathlete

Personal information
- Nationality: Czech Republic
- Born: 12 July 1980 (age 45) Plzeň, Czechoslovakia
- Height: 1.79 m (5 ft 10 1/2 in)
- Weight: 68 kg (150 lb)

Sport
- Sport: Modern pentathlon
- Club: ASC Dukla Praha; PSC Plzeň
Medal record
Men's modern pentathlon
Representing Czech Republic
World Championships
Silver medal – second place	2004 Moscow	Team
Silver medal – second place	2005 Warsaw	Team
Silver medal – second place	2007 Berlin	Team
Bronze medal – third place	2003 Pesaro	Individual
Bronze medal – third place	2005 Warsaw	Relay
Bronze medal – third place	2006 Guatemala City	Team
Bronze medal – third place	2007 Berlin	Relay

Michal Michalík (born 12 July 1980 in Plzeň) is a modern pentathlete from the Czech Republic. He competed at the 2004 Summer Olympics in Athens, where he finished sixth in the men's event, with a score of 5,332 points, and managed to repeat his position at the 2008 Summer Olympics in Beijing. He is currently ranked no. 37 in the world by the Union Internationale de Pentathlon Moderne (UIPM).

Michalík reached his first international success in modern pentathlon, when he won the gold medal at the 2001 World Junior Championships in Budapest, Hungary. In the following year, he was admitted to the national team, and continued to achieve his best results in modern pentathlon, including his third-place finish at the 2003 World Championships in Pesaro, Italy, and two team and relay medals at the 2007 World Championships in Berlin, Germany.
