= Paulina Boenisz =

Polish modern pentathlete (born 1978)

Personal information
- Full name: Paulina Joanna Boenisz
- Nationality: Poland
- Born: 28 September 1978 (age 47) Warsaw, Poland
- Height: 1.72 m (5 ft 7 1/2 in)
- Weight: 60 kg (132 lb)

Sport
- Sport: Modern pentathlon
- Club: CWKS Legia Warszawa
Medal record
Women's modern pentathlon
Representing Poland
World Championships
Gold medal – first place	2004 Moscow	Relay
Gold medal – first place	2006 Guatemala City	Team
Gold medal – first place	2006 Guatemala City	Relay
Gold medal – first place	2008 Budapest	Team
Silver medal – second place	2007 Berlin	Relay
Bronze medal – third place	2005 Warsaw	Team
Bronze medal – third place	2008 Budapest	Relay
Bronze medal – third place	2009 London	Relay

Paulina Joanna Boenisz (born 28 September 1978 in Warsaw) is a three-time Olympic modern pentathlete from Poland. She is also a six-time Polish national champion and a multiple-time medalist at the World Championships, where she won four golds for both women's team and relay events.

Boenisz achieved her best results, and consistently performed in the women's event at the Olympics, finishing fifth in 2000, tenth in 2004, and fifth in 2008.
