= Miao Yihua =

Chinese modern pentathlete

Medal record

Women's modern pentathlon

Representing China

World Championships
Bronze medal – third place	2012 Rome	Team
Silver medal – second place	2012 Rome	Relay

Miao Yihua (born 11 February 1988) is a Chinese pentathlete. She was born in Shanghai. She competed in modern pentathlon at the 2012 Summer Olympics in London.
