= Ilia Frolov =

Russian modern pentathlete

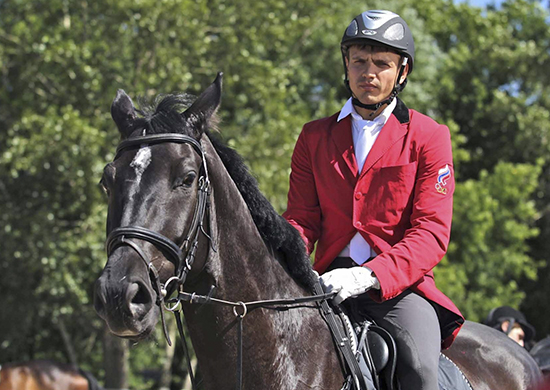

Personal information
- Full name: Ilia Mikhailovich Frolov
- Nationality: Russia
- Born: 4 April 1984 (age 42) Samara, Russian SFSR
- Height: 1.80 m (5 ft 11 in)
- Weight: 70 kg (154 lb)

Sport
- Sport: Modern pentathlon
Medal record
Men's modern pentathlon
Representing Russia
World Championships
Gold medal – first place	2008 Budapest	Individual
Gold medal – first place	2008 Budapest	Team
Gold medal – first place	2011 Moscow	Team
Silver medal – second place	2007 Berlin	Individual
Silver medal – second place	2015 Berlin	Team
Silver medal – second place	2016 Moscow	Relay
European Championships
Gold medal – first place	2007 Riga	Team
Gold medal – first place	2011 Medway	Team
Gold medal – first place	2012 Sofia	Individual
Gold medal – first place	2012 Sofia	Team
Gold medal – first place	2014 Székesfehérvár	Relay
Silver medal – second place	2007 Riga	Individual
Silver medal – second place	2008 Moscow	Individual
Silver medal – second place	2009 Leipzig	Individual
Silver medal – second place	2014 Székesfehérvár	Individual
Silver medal – second place	2015 Bath	Team
Silver medal – second place	2006 Budapest	Team
Military World Games
Gold medal – first place	2019 Wuhan	Team

Ilia Mikhailovich Frolov (Russian: Илья Михайлович Фролов; born April 4, 1984, in Samara) is a modern pentathlete from Russia. He is also a multiple-time medalist in the World and European Championships, and World Cup circuits, and is currently ranked no. 3 in the world by the Union Internationale de Pentathlon Moderne (UIPM).

Frolov qualified for the 2008 Summer Olympics in Beijing, along with his teammate and defending champion Andrey Moiseev, and competed in the men's event. During the competition, Frolov struggled in the early segments, with slightly fair scores in pistol shooting and a one-touch épée fencing, but he was managed to perform consistently in the final rounds, including his second-place finish for the 3 km cross-country running. Frolov's best result in the last round was insufficiently enough to reach the top position, and he eventually finished in twentieth place, while Moiseev successfully defending his Olympic title.

Despite his disappointing performance at the Olympics, Frolov eventually won a team gold medal at the 2011 World Modern Pentathlon Championships in Moscow, and added another winning streak at the UIPM World Cup circuits in Chengdu, China, and in Charlotte, North Carolina, in the United States.
