= Liudmila Sirotkina =

Kyrgyzstani modern pentathlete

Liudmila Sirotkina (born April 17, 1981) is a Kyrgyzstani modern pentathlete. She placed 23rd in the women's individual event at the 2004 Summer Olympics.
