= Ilya Palazkov =

Belarusian modern pentathlete

Personal information
- Nationality: Belarusian
- Born: 2 August 1995 (age 29); Mogilev, Belarus

Sport
- Sport: Modern pentathlon

Ilya Palazkov (born 2 August 1995) is a Belarusian modern pentathlete. He competed in the men's event at the 2020 Summer Olympics.
