= Evdokia Gretchichnikova =

Russian modern pentathlete

Personal information
- Born: 9 December 1982 (age 43) Ufa, Russia
- Height: 1.67 m (5 ft 5 1/2 in)
- Weight: 55 kg (121 lb)

Sport
- Country: Russia
- Sport: Modern pentathlon
- Coached by: Alexey Khaplanov, Andrey Fedotov
Medal record
Women's modern pentathlon
Representing Russia
World Championships
Bronze medal – third place	2007 Berlin	Team
- Updated on 4 April 2013

Evdokia Gretchichnikova (born 9 December 1982) is a Russian modern pentathlete. At the 2008 Summer Olympics, she finished in 25th. At the 2012 Summer Olympics, she competed in the women's competition, finishing in 35th place.
