= Sylwia Gawlikowska =

Polish modern pentathlete

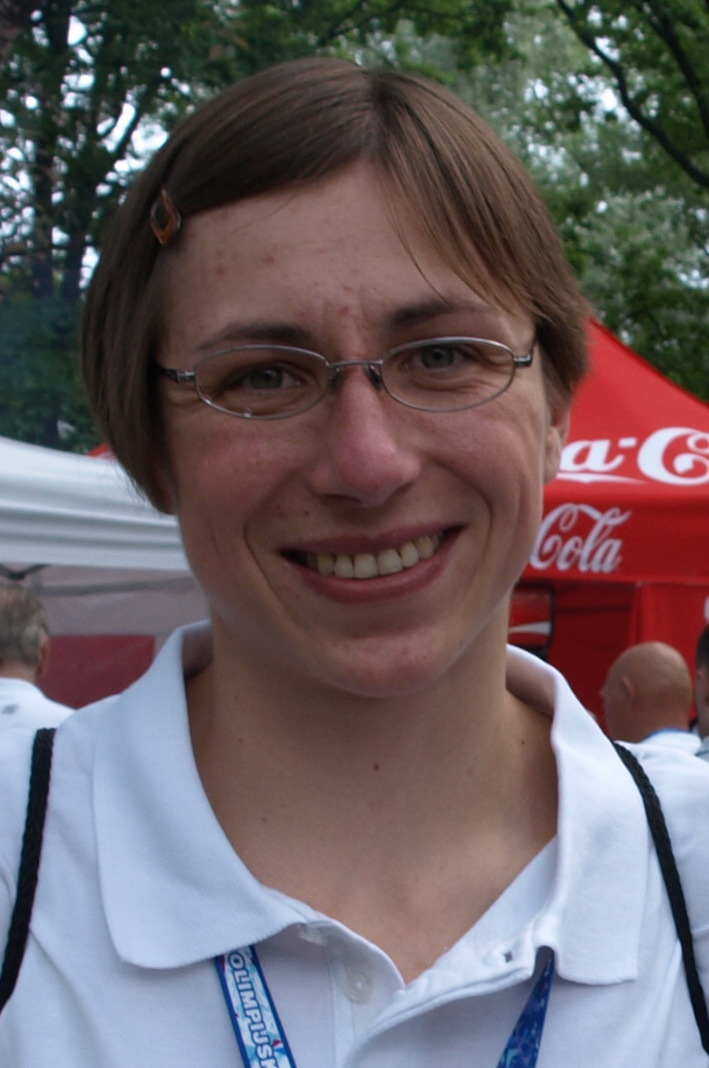
- Gawlikowska in 2013

Medal record

Women's modern pentathlon

Representing Poland

World Championships
Silver medal – second place	2007 Berlin	Relay
Gold medal – first place	2008 Budapest	Team
Bronze medal – third place	2008 Budapest	Relay
Bronze medal – third place	2009 London	Relay

European Championships
Silver medal – second place	2012 Sofia	Relay

Sylwia Gawlikowska (born 25 February 1983, in Warsaw) is a Polish modern pentathlete. At the 2012 Summer Olympics, she competed in the women's competition, finishing in 13th place.
