= Edvinas Krungolcas =

Lithuanian modern pentathlete (born 1973)

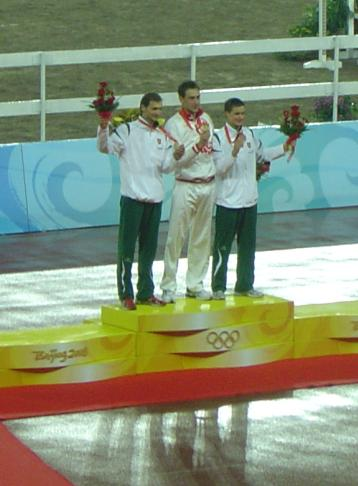
- Krungolcas (left) on the podium with his silver medal from the 2008 Olympics.

Medal record

Men's modern pentathlon

Representing Lithuania

Olympic Games
Silver medal – second place	2008 Beijing	Individual

World Championships
Gold medal – first place	2006 Guatemala	Individual
Gold medal – first place	2006 Guatemala	Team
Gold medal – first place	2009 London	Team
Gold medal – first place	2010 Chengdu	Team
Silver medal – second place	1998 Mexico City	Individual
Silver medal – second place	1999 Budapest	Team
Silver medal – second place	2001 Millfield	Team
Silver medal – second place	2002 San Francisco	Individual
Silver medal – second place	2008 Budapest	Relay
Bronze medal – third place	2002 San Francisco	Team

European Championships
Gold medal – first place	2003 Ústí nad Labem	Individual
Gold medal – first place	2004 Albena	Individual
Gold medal – first place	2005 Montepulciano	Individual
Gold medal – first place	2009 Leipzig	Team
Silver medal – second place	2001 Sofia	Individual
Bronze medal – third place	1998 Uppsala	Individual
Bronze medal – third place	2010 Debrecen	Team

Edvinas Krungolcas (born 21 January 1973) is a retired Lithuanian modern pentathlete who won the silver medal at the 2008 Summer Olympics in Beijing, China.

On 21 January 2013 Krungolcas announced the end of his pentathlete career. Krungolcas participated as official at the 2016 Olympics.

Awards
Preceded by (Lithuania) Ramūnas Šiškauskas	Best Lithuanian sportsman of the Year; 2008	Succeeded by (Lithuania) Simona Krupeckaitė
