= Andrey Moiseyev =

Russian modern pentathlete

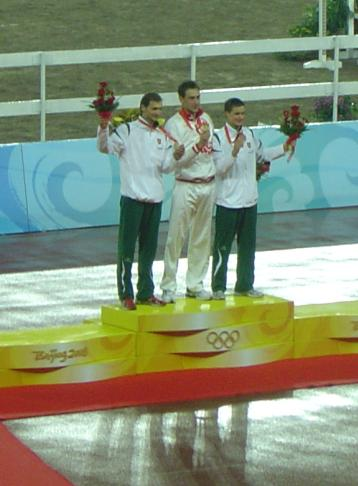
- Moiseyev (centre) on the podium with his gold medal from the 2008 Olympics.

Personal information
- Born: 3 June 1979 (age 47) Rostov-on-Don, Russian SFSR, Soviet Union
Medal record
Men's modern pentathlon
Representing Russia
Olympic Games
Gold medal – first place	2004 Athens	Individual
Gold medal – first place	2008 Beijing	Individual
World Championships
Gold medal – first place	2004 Moscow	Team
Gold medal – first place	2004 Moscow	Relay
Gold medal – first place	2005 Warsaw	Team
Gold medal – first place	2008 Budapest	Team
Bronze medal – third place	2005 Warsaw	Individual

Andrey Sergeyevich Moiseyev (Russian: Андрей Серге́евич Моисеев, born 3 June 1979) is a Russian pentathlete, who won the gold medal in the modern pentathlon at the 2004 Summer Olympics and 2008 Summer Olympics. His 2004 score of 5480 is broken down as follows:

- Shooting — 1036
- Fencing — 1000
- Swimming — 1376
- Riding — 1032
- Running — 1036
