= 2016 in modern pentathlon =

This article lists the main modern pentathlon events and their results for 2016.

== 2016 Summer Olympics (UIPM) ==
- August 18 – 20: 2016 Summer Olympics in (Brazil) Rio de Janeiro at the Deodoro Modern Pentathlon Park
  - Men: (gold) (Russia) Aleksander Lesun; (silver) (Ukraine) Pavlo Tymoshchenko; (bronze) (Mexico) Ismael Marcelo Hernandez Uscanga
  - Women: (gold) (Australia) Chloe Esposito; (silver) (France) Élodie Clouvel; (bronze) (Poland) Oktawia Nowacka

== World modern pentathlon events ==
- May 22 – 29: 2016 World Modern Pentathlon Championships in Moscow
  - Individual winners: (France) Valentin Belaud (m) / (Hungary) Sarolta Kovács (f)
  - Team Relay winners: South Korea (Hwang Woo-jin & Jun Woong-tae) (m) / Germany (Lena Schöneborn & Annika Schleu) (f)
  - Mixed Team Relay winners: Russia (Aleksander Lesun & Donata Rimšaitė)
  - Men's Team winners: Egypt (Yasser Hefny, Amro El Geziry, & Omar El Geziry)
  - Women's Team winners: Hungary (Tamara Alekszejev, Zsofia Foldhazi, & Sarolta Kovács)
- July 12 – 19: 2016 World Youth "A" Modern Pentathlon Championships in (Republic of Ireland) Limerick
  - Youth Individual winners: (South Korea) JEONG Young-jin (m) / (Italy) Aurora Tognetti (f)
  - Youth Team Relay winners: South Korea (JEONG Young-jin & KIM Woo-cheol) (m) / Italy (Aurora Tognetti & Elena Micheli) (f)
  - Youth Mixed Team Relay winners: Russia (Xeina Fralcova & Andrei Zuev)
  - Youth Men's Team winners: South Korea (KIM Se-dong, KIM Dae-won, & JEONG Young-jin)
  - Youth Women's Team winners: Russia (Mariia Khamppu, Xeina Fralcova, & Adelina Ibatullina)
- September 11 – 18: 2016 World Junior Modern Pentathlon Championships in (Egypt) Cairo
  - Junior Individual winners: (Guatemala) Charles Fernandez (m) / (South Korea) KIM Sun-woo (f)
  - Junior Team Relay winners: Russia (Alexander Lifanov & Serge Baranov) (m) / Russia (Sofia Serkina & Alena Popova) (f)
  - Junior Mixed Team Relay winners: Italy (Matteo Cicinelli & Francesca Tognetti)
  - Junior Men's Team winners: Russia (Danila Glavatskikh, Viacheslav Bardyshev, & Alexander Lifanov)
  - Junior Women's Team winners: Italy (Aurora Tognetti, Irene Prampolini, & Francesca Tognetti)
- September 17 – 26: 2016 World CISM Military Modern Pentathlon Championships in (Germany) Warendorf
  - Individual winners: (Egypt) Yasser Hefny (m) / (Russia) Ekaterina Khuraskina (f)
  - Mixed Team Relay winners: Poland (Oktawia Nowacka & Jaroslaw Swiderski)
  - Men's Team winners: Egypt (Sherif Rashad, Eslam Hamad, & Yasser Hefny)
  - Women's Team winners: Russia (Anna Savchenko, Ekaterina Khuraskina, & Svetlana Lebedeva)

== Continental modern pentathlon events ==
- March 15 – 20: 2016 Pan American & South American Modern Pentathlon Championships in (Argentina) Buenos Aires
  - Individual winners: (United States) Nathan Schrimsher (m) / (Cuba) Leidis Laura Moya (f)
  - Men's Team winners: United States (Nathan Schrimsher, Dennis Bowsher, & Lucas Schrimsher)
  - Women's Team winners: United States (Samantha Achterberg, Margaux Isaksen, & Isabella Isaksen)
- June 6 – 12: 2016 European Junior Modern Pentathlon Championships in (Poland) Drzonków
  - Junior Individual winners: (Italy) Alessandro Colasanti (m) / (Italy) Francesca Tognetti (f)
  - Junior Team Relay winners: France (Brice Loubet & Gregory Flayols) (m) / Hungary (Sarolta Simon & Alexandra Boros) (f)
  - Junior Mixed Team Relay winners: Belarus (Ilya Palazkov & Iryna Prasiantsova)
  - Junior Men's Team winners: Russia (Viacheslav Bardyshev, Danila Glavatskikh, & Alexander Lifanov)
  - Junior Women's Team winners: Russia (Sofia Serkina, Alena Shornikova, & Xeina Fralcova) (f)
- July 4 – 11: 2016 European Modern Pentathlon Championships in (Bulgaria) Sofia
  - Individual winners: (Czech Republic) Jan Kuf (m) / (Lithuania) Laura Asadauskaitė (f)
  - Team Relay winners: Russia (Alexander Savkin & Aleksander Lesun) (m) / Belarus (Iryna Prasiantsova & Katsiaryna Arol) (f)
  - Mixed Team Relay winners: Czech Republic (Natalie Dianová & Jan Kuf)
  - Men's Team winners: Italy (Pierpaolo Petroni, Fabio Poddighe, & Riccardo De Luca)
  - Women's Team winners: Lithuania (Gintarė Venčkauskaitė, Laura Asadauskaitė, & Karolina Guzauskaitė) (f)
- July 27 – 31: 2016 European Youth "A" Modern Pentathlon Championships (Tetrathlon) in (Spain) Barcelona
  - Youth Individual winners: (Belarus) Ivan Khamtsou (m) / (Russia) Xeina Fralcova (f)
  - Youth Team Relay winners: Great Britain (Josh Miller & Harry Sykes) (m) / Italy (Aurora Tognetti & Elena Micheli) (f)
  - Youth Mixed Team Relay winners: Russia (Xeina Fralcova & Andrei Zuev)
- August 25 – 28: 2016 European Youth "B" Modern Pentathlon Championships in (United Kingdom) Solihull
  - Youth Individual winners: (Italy) Giorgio Malan (m) / (Spain) Laura Heredia (f)
  - Youth Team Relay winners: Hungary (David Soponyai & Csaba Bohm) (m) / Czech Republic (Katerina Tomanova & Veronika Novotna) (f)
  - Youth Mixed Team Relay winners: Turkey (Yaren Nur Polat & Alp Tas Mehmet)

== 2016 Modern Pentathlon World Cup ==
- February 21 – 28: MP World Cup #1 in (Egypt) Cairo
  - Individual winners: (Egypt) Amro El Geziry (m) / (Germany) Lena Schöneborn (f)
  - Mixed Team Relay winners: Italy (Auro Franceschini & Lavinia Bonessio)
- March 8 – 15: MP World Cup #2 in (Brazil) Rio de Janeiro (Olympic Test Event)
  - Individual winners: (South Korea) JUN Woong-tae (m) / (Italy) Claudia Cesarini (f)
  - Mixed Team Relay winners: Germany (Lena Schöneborn & Patrick Douge)
- March 30 – April 3: MP World Cup #3 in Rome
  - Individual winners: (France) Valentin Prades (m) / (Lithuania) Laura Asadauskaitė (f)
  - Mixed Team Relay winners: Italy (Lorenzo Michele & Lavinia Bonessio)
- April 13 – 18: MP World Cup #4 in (Hungary) Kecskemét
  - Individual winners: (United Kingdom) James Cooke (m) / (Belarus) Anastasiya Prokopenko (f)
  - Mixed Team Relay winners: Guatemala (Charles Fernandez & Isabel Brand)
- May 3 – 9: MP World Cup #5 (final) in (United States) Sarasota, Florida
  - Individual winners: (United Kingdom) James Cooke (m) / (Germany) Lena Schöneborn (f)
  - Mixed Team Relay winners: Ireland (Arthur Lanigan-O'Keeffe & Natalya Coyle)
