= 2016 World Modern Pentathlon Championships – Men's individual and team =

Men's athletic competition in 2016

Men's individual at the 2016 UIPM Senior World Championships
- Dates: 26–28 May
- Competitors: 96 from 35 nations
- Winning points: 1514

Medalists
gold medal	Valentin Belaud	France
silver medal	Aleksander Lesun	Russia
bronze medal	Jung Jin-hwa	South Korea

The men's individual at the 2016 UIPM Senior World Championships was held on 26 and 28 May 2016.

== Qualification ==
On 26 May 2016, 36 competitors qualified for the final as described below:

The top 8 total scores in each group qualify by right; the top 12 total scores across the remainder of the field also qualify. Competitors do not perform the riding discipline during qualification.

KEY:	Q	Qualified by right	q	Qualified via remainder ranking

=== Group A ===
Rank	Athlete	Fencing Victories (pts)	Swimming Time (pts)	Combined Time (pts)	Total
1	Aleksander Lesun (RUS)	24 (264)	2:07.50 (318)	11:33.00 (607)	1189 Q
2	Yasser Hefny (EGY)	22 (250)	2:03.32 (331)	11:39.00 (601)	1182 Q
3	Patrick Dogue (GER)	20 (236)	2:08.49 (315)	11:10.00 (630)	1181 Q
4	Jun Woong-tae (KOR)	16 (208)	2:02.84 (332)	11:01.00 (639)	1179 Q
5	Guo Jianli (CHN)	21 (243)	2:03.10 (331)	11:35.00 (605)	1179 Q
6	Valentin Prades (FRA)	21 (243)	2:06.84 (320)	11:28.00 (612)	1175 Q
7	Justinas Kinderis (LTU)	21 (243)	2:07.16 (319)	11:29.00 (611)	1173 Q
8	Ruslan Nakonechnyi (LAT)	20 (236)	2:04.06 (328)	11:31.00 (609)	1173 Q
9	Ondřej Polívka (CZE)	17 (215)	2:04.91 (326)	11:09.00 (631)	1172 q
10	Róbert Kasza (HUN)	16 (208)	2:02.22 (334)	11:15.00 (625)	1167 q
11	Fabian Liebig (GER)	16 (208)	2:05.50 (324)	11:11.00 (629)	1161
12	Tomoyuki Ono (JPN)	18 (222)	2:03.46 (330)	11:33.00 (607)	1159
13	Jarosław Świderski (POL)	13 (187)	2:03.18 (331)	11:13.00 (627)	1145
14	Mikalai Hayanouski (BLR)	16 (208)	2:04.84 (326)	11:32.00 (608)	1142
15	Pavel Ilyashenko (KAZ)	12 (180)	2:05.01 (325)	11:05.00 (635)	1140
16	Fabio Poddighe (ITA)	11 (173)	2:03.61 (330)	11:09.00 (631)	1134
17	Hayato Noguchi (JPN)	22 (250)	2:03.61 (330)	12:29.00 (551)	1131
18	Szymon Staśkiewicz (POL)	18 (222)	2:11.06 (307)	11:48.00 (592)	1121
19	Denys Pavlyuk (UKR)	12 (180)	2:07.18 (319)	11:21.00 (619)	1118
20	Danilo Fagundes (BRA)	15 (201)	2:12.50 (303)	11:28.00 (612)	1116
21	Samuel Curry (GBR)	14 (194)	2:04.25 (328)	11:48.00 (592)	1114
22	Christopher Patte (FRA)	11 (173)	2:06.30 (322)	11:25.00 (615)	1110
23	Gustav Gustenau (AUT)	11 (173)	2:01.33 (336)	11:46.00 (594)	1103
24	Jorge Abraham Camacho (MEX)	13 (187)	2:17.19 (289)	11:18.00 (622)	1098
25	David Kindl (CZE)	12 (180)	2:11.66 (305)	11:28.00 (612)	1097
26	Berndt Burger (RSA)	8 (152)	2:11.72 (305)	11:17.00 (623)	1080
27	Pāvels Švecovs (LAT)	13 (187)	2:05.37 (324)	12:19.00 (561)	1072
28	Thomas Toolis (GBR)	14 (194)	2:03.21 (331)	12:34.00 (546)	1071
29	Ján Szalay (SVK)	17 (215)	2:12.67 (302)	12:31.00 (549)	1066
30	Temirlan Aytimbetov (KGZ)	12 (180)	2:13.53 (300)	12:18.00 (562)	1042
31	Canberk Hulusi Ekin (TUR)	10 (166)	2:16.83 (290)	12:04.00 (576)	1032
32	Leandro Silva (ARG)	9 (159)	2:05.15 (325)	12:35.00 (545)	1029

=== Group B ===
Rank	Athlete	Fencing Victories (pts)	Swimming Time (pts)	Combined Time (pts)	Total
1	Arthur Lanigan-O'Keeffe (IRL)	16 (208)	2:01.75 (335)	11:04.00 (636)	1179 Q
2	James Cooke (GBR)	19 (229)	1:59.10 (343)	11:33.00 (607)	1179 Q
3	Valentin Belaud (FRA)	21 (233)	2:07.56 (318)	11:13.00 (627)	1178 Q
4	Tomoya Miguchi (JPN)	25 (271)	2:01.92 (335)	12:08.20 (572)	1178 Q
5	Auro Franceschini (ITA)	16 (208)	2:00.27 (340)	11:10.30 (630)	1178 Q
6	Pavlo Tymoshchenko (UKR)	20 (236)	2:12.01 (304)	11:02.40 (638)	1178 Q
7	Jan Kuf (CZE)	16 (208)	2:04.84 (326)	10:57.00 (643)	1177 Q
8	Péter Tibolya (HUN)	21 (243)	2:09.32 (313)	11:20.00 (620)	1176 Q
9	Ismael Hernández (MEX)	13 (187)	2:04.13 (328)	10:41.00 (659)	1174 q
10	Shohei Iwamoto (JPN)	15 (201)	2:07.68 (317)	10:46.00 (654)	1172 q
11	Egor Puchkarevskiy (RUS)	20 (236)	2:02.76 (332)	11:36.46 (604)	1172 q
12	Cao Zhongrong (CHN)	18 (222)	1:59.94 (341)	11:33.00 (607)	1170 q
13	Gauthier Romani (FRA)	16 (208)	1:59.24 (343)	11:24.00 (616)	1167 q
14	Vladislav Sukharev (KAZ)	16 (208)	2:02.01 (334)	11:19.00 (621)	1163 q
15	Lee Woo-jin (KOR)	15 (201)	2:02.66 (332)	11:19.00 (621)	1154
16	Ilya Palazkov (BLR)	18 (222)	2:05.89 (323)	11:35.00 (605)	1150
17	Su Haihang (CHN)	18 (222)	2:03.01 (331)	11:48.00 (592)	1145
18	Álvaro Sandoval (MEX)	15 (201)	2:08.75 (314)	11:14.00 (626)	1141
19	Dimitar Krastanov (BUL)	14 (194)	2:04.89 (326)	11:28.00 (612)	1132
20	Riccardo De Luca (ITA)	17 (215)	2:07.80 (317)	11:56.00 (584)	1116
21	Andriy Fedechko (UKR)	15 (201)	2:06.93 (320)	11:51.00 (589)	1110
22	Denis Tyurin (KAZ)	14 (194)	2:08.38 (315)	11:43.00 (597)	1106
23	Eslam Hamad (EGY)	12 (180)	2:06.52 (321)	11:40.00 (600)	1101
24	Lucas Schrimsher (USA)	13 (187)	2:04.93 (326)	11:58.00 (582)	1095
25	Stefan Köllner (GER)	13 (187)	2:13.63 (300)	11:38.00 (602)	1089
26	Sebastian Stasiak (POL)	10 (166)	2:04.83 (326)	11:43.00 (597)	1089
27	Pieter Oosthuizen (RSA)	13 (187)	2:24.73 (266)	11:28.00 (612)	1065
28	Deniss Čerkovskis (LAT)	18 (222)	2:14.49 (297)	12:46.00 (534)	1053
29	Justin Torrellas (USA)	8 (152)	2:27.65 (258)	11:40.00 (600)	1010
30	Benjamin Ortiz (CHI)	6 (138)	2:13.68 (299)	12:15.00 (565)	1002
31	Enrico Ortolani (BRA)	7 (145)	2:11.97 (305)	12:31.00 (549)	999
32	Christian Zillekens (GER)	14 (194)	2:08.81 (314)	DNS (0)	508

=== Group C ===
Rank	Athlete	Fencing Victories (pts)	Swimming Time (pts)	Combined Time (pts)	Total
1	Kirill Kasyanik (BLR)	23 (257)	2:02.85 (332)	11:43.56 (597)	1186 Q
2	Cristóbal Rodríguez (ESP)	21 (243)	2:03.67 (329)	11:33.38 (607)	1179 Q
DSQ (3)	Maksim Kustov (RUS)	18 (222)	1:59.73 (341)	11:26.21 (614)	1177 Q
4	Omar El Geziry (EGY)	23 (257)	2:02.24 (334)	11:55.53 (585)	1176 Q
5	Pavel Tsikhanau (BLR)	18 (222)	2:07.62 (318)	11:04.87 (636)	1176 Q
6	Esteban Bustos (CHI)	17 (215)	2:08.62 (315)	10:55.26 (645)	1175 Q
7	Bence Demeter (HUN)	23 (257)	2:04.07 (328)	11:51.74 (589)	1174 Q
8	Charles Fernandez (GUA)	18 (222)	2:04.28 (328)	11:17.66 (623)	1173 Q
9	Pierpaolo Petroni (ITA)	18 (222)	2:06.24 (322)	11:12.16 (628)	1172 q
10	Amro El Geziry (EGY)	20 (226)	1:57.54 (348)	11:42.84 (598)	1172 q
11	Jorge Inzunza (MEX)	16 (208)	2:02.11 (334)	11:12.23 (628)	1170 q
12	Jung Jin-hwa (KOR)	13 (187)	2:01.23 (337)	10:59.91 (641)	1165 q
13	Ádám Marosi (HUN)	14 (194)	2:01.08 (337)	11:11.69 (629)	1160
14	Joe Choong (GBR)	14 (194)	1:59.76 (341)	11:39.58 (601)	1136
15	Hwang Woo-jin (KOR)	17 (215)	2:01.14 (337)	11:57.32 (583)	1135
16	Han Jiahao (CHN)	15 (201)	2:01.00 (337)	11:46.58 (594)	1132
17	Thomas Daniel (AUT)	16 (208)	2:11.16 (307)	11:28.15 (612)	1127
18	Jorge Imeri (GUA)	17 (215)	2:07.20 (319)	11:49.67 (591)	1125
19	Aleix Heredia Vives (ESP)	20 (236)	2:13.71 (299)	12:08.66 (572)	1107
20	Igor Sozinov (KAZ)	16 (208)	2:11.76 (305)	11:52.29 (588)	1101
21	Michał Gralewski (POL)	12 (180)	1:59.23 (343)	12:08.13 (572)	1095
22	Lester Ders (CUB)	11 (173)	2:03.89 (329)	11:53.80 (587)	1089
23	Alexandros Pantazidis (GRE)	12 (180)	2:08.53 (315)	11:50.59 (590)	1085
24	Kirill Belyakov (RUS)	16 (208)	2:01.53 (336)	12:48.60 (532)	1076
25	Sergio Villamayor (ARG)	13 (187)	2:15.79 (293)	11:49.01 (591)	1071
26	Filipe Nascimento (BRA)	10 (166)	2:06.99 (320)	11:57.23 (583)	1069
27	Nikita Kuznetsov (KGZ)	12 (180)	2:12.84 (302)	11:54.42 (586)	1068
28	Yuriy Fedechko (UKR)	10 (166)	2:04.21 (328)	12:10.04 (570)	1064
29	Ismo Salminen (FIN)	9 (159)	2:09.26 (313)	11:51.64 (589)	1061
30	Sam Ruddock (USA)	6 (138)	2:05.18 (325)	12:13.23 (567)	1030
31	José Figueroa (CUB)	15 (201)	2:14.64 (297)	13:04.95 (516)	1014
32	Emiliano Zapata (ARG)	9 (159)	2:14.83 (296)	13:07.54 (513)	968

== Final ==
The final was held on 28 May 2016.

Rank	Athlete	Fencing Victories (pts)	Swimming Time (pts)	Riding Time (pts)	Combined Time (pts)	Total
1st place, gold medalist(s)	Valentin Belaud (FRA)	22 (238)	2:07.93 (317)	74.00 (300)	10:41.09 (659)	1514
2nd place, silver medalist(s)	Aleksander Lesun (RUS)	24 (250)	2:07.00 (319)	77.00 (299)	10:58.98 (642)	1510
3rd place, bronze medalist(s)	Jung Jin-hwa (KOR)	24 (250)	2:00.12 (340)	75.00 (300)	11:26.57 (614)	1504
4	Omar El Geziry (EGY)	25 (258)	2:01.97 (335)	74.00 (300)	11:39.33 (601)	1494
5	Yasser Hefny (EGY)	22 (238)	2:02.94 (332)	82.00 (280)	11:00.45 (640)	1490
6	Amro El Geziry (EGY)	24 (250)	1:56.50 (351)	75.00 (272)	11:24.85 (616)	1489
DSQ (7)	Maksim Kustov (RUS)	18 (215)	1:59.16 (343)	71.00 (293)	11:04.05 (636)	~~1487~~
8	Justinas Kinderis (LTU)	21 (239)	2:07.04 (319)	79.00 (297)	11:08.56 (632)	1487
9	James Cooke (GBR)	17 (209)	1:57.57 (348)	72.00 (300)	11:12.82 (628)	1485
10	Valentin Prades (FRA)	17 (209)	2:05.70 (323)	71.00 (300)	10:50.12 (650)	1482
11	Jan Kuf (CZE)	17 (208)	2:05.46 (324)	76.70 (300)	10:55.85 (645)	1477
12	Bence Demeter (HUN)	16 (204)	2:04.26 (328)	77.00 (299)	10:56.70 (644)	1475
13	Charles Fernandez (GUA)	14 (192)	2:03.07 (331)	76.00 (300)	10:55.16 (645)	1468
14	Ruslan Nakonechnyi (LAT)	17 (209)	2:02.16 (334)	74.00 (286)	11:03.25 (637)	1466
15	Pierpaolo Petroni (ITA)	22 (238)	2:05.23 (325)	81.00 (278)	11:17.69 (623)	1464
16	Esteban Bustos (CHI)	19 (221)	2:11.21 (307)	73.00 (300)	11:05.66 (635)	1463
17	Guo Jianli (CHN)	16 (202)	2:02.91 (332)	71.00 (293)	11:08.77 (632)	1459
18	Arthur Lanigan-O'Keeffe (IRL)	19 (221)	2:02.19 (334)	80.00 (275)	11:13.62 (627)	1457
19	Péter Tibolya (HUN)	19 (221)	2:07.67 (317)	74.00 (293)	11:21.60 (619)	1450
20	Jun Woong-tae (KOR)	16 (202)	2:02.04 (334)	72.00 (279)	11:13.67 (627)	1442
21	Róbert Kasza (HUN)	17 (210)	2:02.27 (334)	75.00 (300)	11:43.28 (597)	1441
22	Gauthier Romani (FRA)	15 (197)	1:59.95 (341)	76.00 (286)	11:29.27 (611)	1435
23	Ismael Hernández (MEX)	12 (180)	2:04.38 (327)	89.00 (270)	10:45.65 (655)	1432
24	Cao Zhongrong (CHN)	13 (187)	1:59.83 (341)	77.00 (285)	11:28.48 (612)	1425
25	Auro Franceschini (ITA)	15 (196)	2:00.75 (338)	80.00 (275)	11:33.41 (607)	1416
26	Pavlo Tymoshchenko (UKR)	14 (181)	2:10.42 (309)	73.00 (300)	11:25.91 (615)	1405
27	Cristóbal Rodríguez (ESP)	16 (204)	2:04.92 (326)	72.00 (286)	11:55.04 (585)	1401
28	Tomoya Miguchi (JPN)	15 (197)	2:01.05 (337)	76.00 (300)	12:15.93 (565)	1399
29	Jorge Inzunza (MEX)	10 (166)	2:02.34 (333)	71.00 (293)	11:35.72 (605)	1397
30	Kirill Kasyanik (BLR)	15 (197)	2:03.71 (329)	74.00 (286)	11:56.57 (584)	1396
31	Pavel Tsikhanau (BLR)	13 (184)	2:07.46 (318)	78.00 (267)	11:34.93 (606)	1375
32	Patrick Dogue (GER)	9 (161)	2:07.91 (317)	113.00 (243)	10:52.58 (648)	1369
33	Shohei Iwamoto (JPN)	11 (173)	2:06.36 (321)	92.00 (267)	11:33.40 (607)	1368
34	Ondřej Polívka (CZE)	12 (178)	2:05.17 (325)	85.00 (281)	12:16.10 (564)	1348
35	Vladislav Sukharev (KAZ)	14 (190)	2:02.96 (332)	117.00 (197)	12:26.84 (554)	1273
36	Egor Puchkarevskiy (RUS)	DNS (0)	2:12.35 (303)	DNS (0)	DNS (0)	303

== Team standings ==
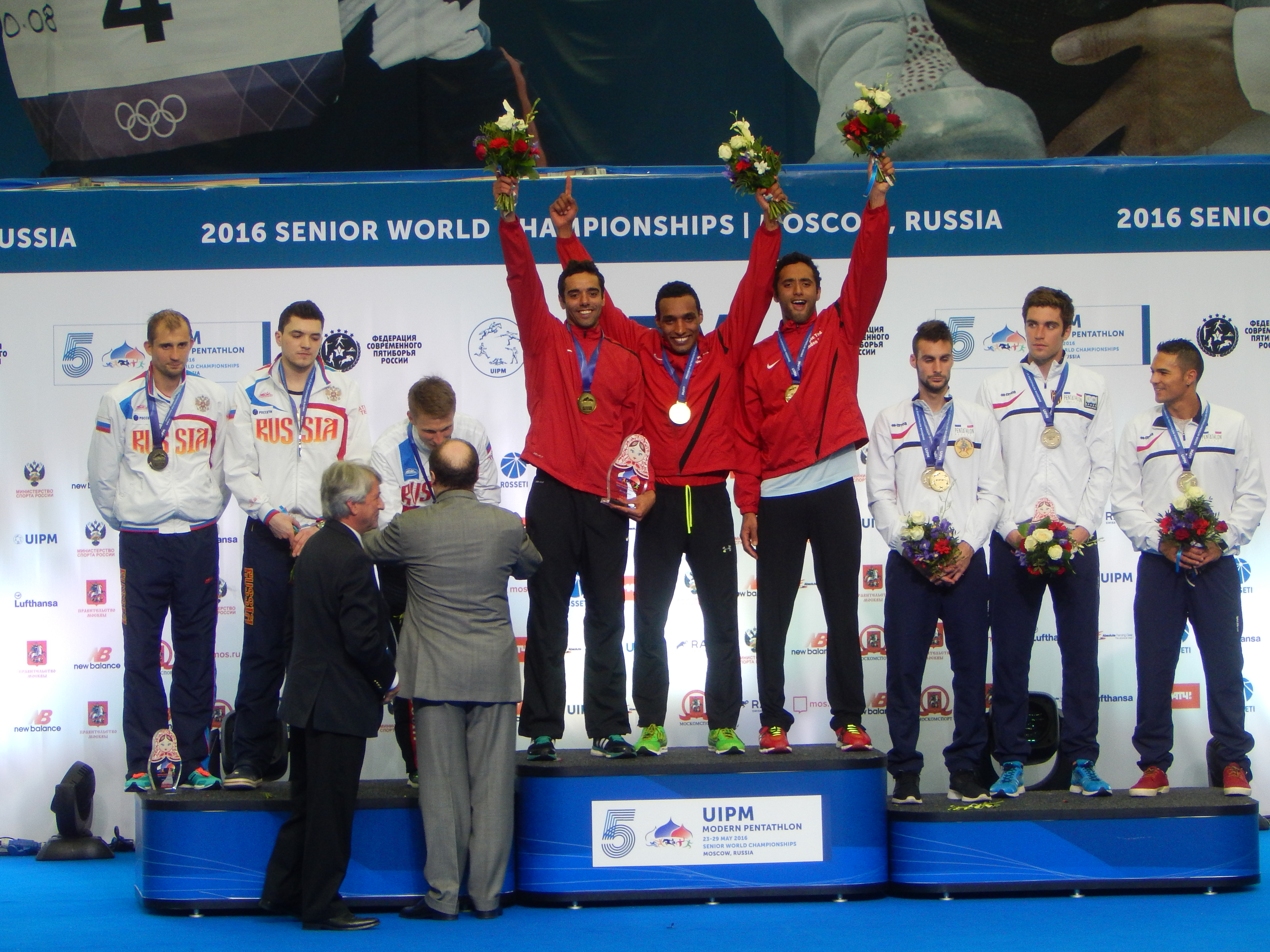
Victory Ceremony

Standings are determined by the sum of three scores for each country, whether or not their respective competitors qualified for the final.

Rank	Country	Athletes	Qualified for final Yes/No	Team score
1st place, gold medalist(s)	Egypt	Amro El Geziry; Yasser Hefny; Omar El Geziry	Y Y Y	4477
2nd place, silver medalist(s)	France	Valentin Prades; Valentin Belaud; Christopher Patte	Y Y N	4106
3rd place, bronze medalist(s)	South Korea	Jun Woong-tae; Jung Jin-hwa; Lee Woo-jin	Y Y N	4100
4	Hungary	Bence Demeter; Róbert Kasza; Ádám Marosi	Y Y N	4076
5	China	Cao Zhongrong; Guo Jianli; Han Jiahao	Y Y N	4016
6	Mexico	Jorge Inzunza; Ismael Hernández; Álvaro Sandoval	Y Y N	3970
7	Japan	Shohei Iwamoto; Tomoya Miguchi; Tomoyuki Ono	Y Y N	3926
8	Czech Republic	Ondřej Polívka; Jan Kuf; David Kindl	Y Y N	3922
9	Great Britain	James Cooke; Samuel Curry; Joe Choong	Y N N	3735
10	Italy	Pierpaolo Petroni; Riccardo De Luca; Fabio Poddighe	Y N N	3714
11	Belarus	Kirill Kasyanik; Mikalai Hayanouski; Ilya Palazkov	Y N N	3688
12	Ukraine	Pavlo Tymoshchenko; Denys Pavlyuk; Andriy Fedechko	Y N N	3633
13	Latvia	Ruslan Nakonechnyi; Deniss Čerkovskis; Pāvels Švecovs	Y N N	3591
14	Kazakhstan	Vladislav Sukharev; Denis Tyurin; Pavel Ilyashenko	Y N N	3519
15	Germany	Patrick Dogue; Christian Zillekens; Fabian Liebig	Y N N	3038
16	Poland	Jarosław Świderski; Szymon Staśkiewicz; Michał Gralewski	N N N	3361
17	Brazil	Filipe Nascimento; Enrico Ortolani; Danilo Fagundes	N N N	3184
18	United States	Lucas Schrimsher; Sam Ruddock; Justin Torrellas	N N N	3135
19	Argentina	Emiliano Zapata; Sergio Villamayor; Leandro Silva	N N N	3068
DSQ	Russia	Egor Puchkarevskiy; Aleksander Lesun; Maksim Kustov	Y Y Y	~~4169~~
