= Modern pentathlon at the 2023 Pan American Games – Women's individual =

Women's individual at the 2023 Pan American Games
- Venue: Las Condes Military School
- Dates: October 21 - October 23
- Competitors: 33 from 14 nations
- Winning score: 1423

Medalists
| Gold medal | Mayan Oliver; Mexico |
| Silver medal | Catherine Oliver; Mexico |
| Bronze medal | Sophia Hernández; Independent Athletes Team |

The women's individual competition of the modern pentathlon events at the 2023 Pan American Games was held from October 21 to 23 at Las Condes Military School in Chile.

== Schedule ==
| Date | Time | Round |
|---|---|---|
| October 21, 2023 | 09:00 | Fencing Ranking Round |
| October 22, 2023 | 09:00 | Semifinals A - Fencing Bonus Round |
| October 22, 2023 | 09:35 | Semifinals A - Swimming 200m Freestyle |
| October 22, 2023 | 10:05 | Semifinals A - Laser Run |
| October 22, 2023 | 11:50 | Semifinals B - Fencing Bonus Round |
| October 22, 2023 | 12:25 | Semifinals B - Swimming 200m Freestyle |
| October 22, 2023 | 12:55 | Semifinals B - Laser Run |
| October 23, 2023 | 10:00 | Finals - Riding |
| October 23, 2023 | 10:40 | Finals - Fencing Bonus Round |
| October 23, 2023 | 11:15 | Finals - Swimming 200m Freestyle |
| October 23, 2023 | 17:45 | Finals - Laser Run |

== Results ==
| Qualified for the finals |

| Rank | Athlete | Nation | Fencing Victories (pts) | Swimming Time (pts) | Riding Time (pts) | Laser run Time (pts) | Score |
|---|---|---|---|---|---|---|---|
| 1st place, gold medalist(s) | Mayan Oliver | Mexico | 18 (226) | 2:29.77 (251) | 56.00 (300) | 10:54 (646) | 1423 |
| 2nd place, silver medalist(s) | Catherine Oliver | Mexico | 20 (238) | 2:31.09 (248) | 63.00 (290) | 11:09 (631) | 1407 |
| 3rd place, bronze medalist(s) | Sophia Hernández | Independent Athletes Team | 23 (260) | 2:29.60 (251) | 55.10 (293) | 11:59 (581) | 1385 |
| 4 | Jessica Davis | United States | 20 (238) | 2:30.24 (250) | 52.00 (279) | 11:37 (603) | 1370 |
| 5 | Tamara Vega | Mexico | 22 (252) | 2:23.32 (264) | 72.00 (233) | 11:33 (607) | 1356 |
| 6 | Mariana Arceo | Mexico | 17 (230) | 2:22.16 (266) | 69.00 (257) | 11:50 (590) | 1343 |
| 7 | Phaelen French | United States | 21 (244) | 2:41.54 (227) | 73.00 (287) | 11:55 (585) | 1343 |
| 8 | Paula Valencia Franco | Independent Athletes Team | 19 (232) | 2:30.70 (249) | 52.00 (286) | 12:04 (576) | 1343 |
| 9 | Isabela Abreu | Brazil | 19 (244) | 2:34.55 (241) | 56.00 (293) | 12:45 (535) | 1313 |
| 10 | Sol Naranjo | Ecuador | 21 (244) | 2:52.68 (207) | 61.80 (292) | 12:10 (570) | 1313 |
| 11 | Kelly Fitzsimmons | Canada | 19 (234) | 2:25.52 (259) | 54.10 (300) | 13:26 (494) | 1287 |
| 12 | Stephany Saraiva | Brazil | 19 (232) | 2:38.20 (234) | 55.90 (293) | 12:56 (524) | 1283 |
| 13 | Sofía Cabrera | Independent Athletes Team | 18 (226) | 2:37.07 (236) | EL | 11:32 (608) | 1070 |
| 14 | Camila Fuenzalida | Argentina | 15 (210) | 2:32.32 (246) | EL | 11:58 (582) | 1038 |
| 15 | María Belén Serrano | Argentina | 20 (238) | 2:33.78 (243) | EL | 13:13 (507) | 988 |
| 16 | María José Bravo | Chile | 14 (202) | 2:44.05 (222) | EL | 12:18 (562) | 986 |
| 17 | Diana Leyva Dinza | Cuba | 11 (186) | 2:29.34 (252) | EL | 12:57 (523) | 961 |
| 18 | Marcela Mello | Brazil | DNS | DNS | EL | DNS | 0 |
| 19 | Osmaidy Arias | Venezuela | 11 (186) | 2:24.86 (261) | | 12:25 (555) | 1002 |
| 20 | Delmis Pérez | Cuba | 18 (226) | 2:28.66 (253) | | 13:06 (514) | 993 |
| 21 | Heidi Hendrick | United States | 15 (208) | 2:20.89 (269) | | 13:21 (499) | 976 |
| 22 | Dara Salazar Almeida | Ecuador | 20 (238) | 2:30.68 (249) | | 13:37 (483) | 971 |
| 23 | Marcela Cuaspud | Ecuador | 13 (204) | 2:38.38 (234) | | 13:02 (518) | 956 |
| 24 | Ming Ke Li | Canada | 15 (208) | 3:02.55 (185) | | 12:23 (557) | 950 |
| 25 | Devan Wiebe | Canada | 12 (190) | 2:55.46 (200) | | 12:24 (556) | 946 |
| 26 | Valentina La Cruz Gutiérrez | Uruguay | 17 (220) | 2:35.32 (240) | | 13:35 (484) | 944 |
| 27 | Ana Laidys Arias | Dominican Republic | 7 (162) | 2:46.02 (218) | | 13:19 (501) | 881 |
| 28 | Cecilia Fermín | Dominican Republic | 17 (220) | 2:35.63 (239) | | 15:03 (397) | 856 |
| 29 | Rocío Varela | Chile | 12 (192) | 2:52.80 (205) | | 14:37 (423) | 820 |
| 30 | Fatima Cabrera | Bolivia | 18 (226) | 2:32.94 (247) | | 14:19 (441) | 819 |
| 31 | Jeiny Cerda | Bolivia | 5 (148) | 2:40.63 (229) | | 15:46 (354) | 731 |
| 32 | Arantza Castañeda | Peru | 5 (150) | 3:05.35 (180) | | 15:28 (372) | 702 |
| 33 | Martina Armanazqui | Argentina | 16 (218) | DNS | | DNS | 218 |
