= 2019 in modern pentathlon =

This article lists the main modern pentathlon events and their results for 2019.

== International modern pentathlon championships ==
- July 27 – 30: 2019 Pan American Games in (Peru) Lima
  - Individual winners: (Guatemala) Charles Fernandez (m) / (Mexico) Mariana Arceo (f)
  - Team Relay winners: Mexico (Duilio Carrillo & Melchor Silva) (m) / United States (Samantha Achterberg & Jessica Davis) (f)
  - Mixed Team Relay winners: United States (Isabella Isaksen & Amro El Geziry)
  - Men's Team winners: Argentina (Sergio Villamayor, Leandro Silva, & Emmanuel Zapata)
  - Women's Team winners: Brazil (Isabela Abreu, Priscila Oliveira, & Maria Ieda Chaves Guimaraes)
- October 18 – 27: 2019 Military World Games in Wuhan
  - Individual winners: (Russia) Alexander Lifanov (m) / (France) Élodie Clouvel (f)
  - Men's Team winners: Russia (Alexander Lifanov, Ilia Frolov, & Ilya Shugarov)
  - Women's Team winners: China (WANG Shiqi, BIAN Yufei, & WANG Wei)

== World modern pentathlon championships ==
- July 7 – 14: 2019 World Junior Modern Pentathlon Championships in (Poland) Drzonków
  - Junior Individual winners: (France) Jean-Baptiste Mourcia (m) / (Russia) Adelina Ibatullina (f)
  - Junior Team Relay winners: Egypt (Sherif Rashad & Mohanad Shaban) (m) / Russia (Kseniia Fraltsova & Adelina Ibatullina) (f)
  - Junior Mixed Team Relay winners: Egypt (Salma Abdelmaksoud & Ahmed Elgendy)
  - Junior Men's Team winners: Russia (Ivan Tarasov, Andrei Zuev, & Sergey Kolbasenko)
  - Junior Women's Team winners: Russia (Adelina Ibatullina, Alena Avdeeva, & Kseniia Fraltsova)
- July 18 – 24: 2019 World Youth Modern Pentathlon Championships (Tetrathlon) in (Bulgaria) Sofia
  - Youth U19 Individual winners: (Russia) Ivan Shalupin (m) / (Belarus) Kseniya Klimiankova (f)
  - Youth U19 Team Relay winners: Egypt (Omar Mohamed & Noureldin Karim) (m) / Germany (Annika Schneider & Esther Fernandez Donda) (f)
  - Youth U19 Mixed Team Relay winners: South Korea (KIM Jae-hak & YOON Yang-ji)
  - Youth U19 Men's Team winners: Egypt (Adham Fouda, Noureldin Karim, & Eyad Elkashef)
  - Youth U19 Women's Team winners: Russia (Amina Tagirova, Yana Soloveva, & Iuliia Sergeeva)
  - Youth U17 Individual winners: (Egypt) Moutaz Mohamed (m) / (Bulgaria) Svetla Zgurova (f)
  - Youth U17 Team Relay winners: Egypt (Abu Bakr Aleadwy & Moutaz Mohamed) (m) / Japan (Kaede Ohta & Natsu Ohta) (f)
  - Youth U17 Mixed Team Relay winners: Egypt (Moutaz Mohamed & Malak Ismail)
  - Youth U17 Men's Team winners: Russia (Kirill Manuilo, Maksim Gorkovenko, & Vladimir Zeleputin)
  - Youth U17 Women's Team winners: Hungary (Dorka Sára Tóth, Dorina Dobronyi, & Reka Kozma)
- September 1 – 8: 2019 World Modern Pentathlon Championships in (Hungary) Budapest
  - Individual winners: (France) Valentin Belaud (m) / (Belarus) Volha Silkina (f)
  - Team Relay winners: Germany (Patrick Dogue & Alexander Nobis) (m) / Mexico (Mariana Arceo & Mayan Oliver) (f)
  - Mixed Team Relay winners: Egypt (Salma Abdelmaksoud & Eslam Hamad)
  - Men's Team winners: South Korea (Jun Woong-tae, LEE Ji-hun, & Jung Jin-hwa)
  - Women's Team winners: Belarus (Volha Silkina, Anastasiya Prokopenko, & Iryna Prasiantsova)

== Continental modern pentathlon championships ==
- February 21 – 24: 2019 African Modern Pentathlon Championships in Cairo
  - Individual winners: (Egypt) Sherif Nazeir (m) / (Egypt) Haydy Morsy (f)
  - Men's Team winners: Egypt (Sherif Nazier, Mohanad Shaban, & Sherif Rashad) (default)
  - Women's Team winners: Egypt (Haydy Morsy, Kandil Amira, & Aboubakr Sondos) (default)
- June 4 – 9: 2019 European Junior Modern Pentathlon Championships in (Poland) Drzonków
  - Junior Individual winners: (Russia) Andrei Zuev (m) / (Russia) Adelina Ibatullina (f)
  - Junior Team Relay winners: Belarus (Ivan Khamtsou & Yauheni Arol) (m) / Czech Republic (Veronika Novotna & Anna Roubickova) (f)
  - Junior Mixed Team Relay winners: Germany (Pele Uibel & Rebecca Langrehr)
  - Junior Men's Team winners: France (Jean Baptiste Mourcia, Ugo Fleurot, & Paolo Singh)
  - Junior Women's Team winners: Russia (Adelina Ibatullina, Alena Avdeeva, & Kseniia Fraltsova)
- June 9 – 16: 2019 European Youth Modern Pentathlon Championships (Tetrathlon) in (Lithuania) Kaunas
  - Youth Individual winners: (Hungary) Bence Viczián (m) / (Hungary) Rita Erdos (f)
  - Youth Team Relay winners: Italy (Giorgio Micheli & Federico Alessandro) (m) / Germany (Julie Walser & Esther Fernandez Donda) (f)
  - Youth Mixed Team Relay winners: Russia (Vladimir Zabolotskikh & Iuliia Sergeeva)
  - Youth Men's Team winners: Belarus (Uladzislau Berazavik, Ilya Kazlou, & Alexei Khurs)
  - Youth Women's Team winners: Russia (Iuliia Sergeeva, Amina Tagirova, & Yana Soloveva)
- August 6 – 11: 2019 European Modern Pentathlon Championships (Olympic Qualification) in (United Kingdom) Bath
  - Individual winners: (United Kingdom) James Cooke (m) / (Lithuania) Laura Asadauskaitė (f)
  - Team Relay winners: Great Britain (Oliver Murray & Myles Pillage) (m) / Russia (Ekaterina Khuraskina & Anastasia Petrova) (f)
  - Mixed Team Relay winners: Great Britain (Kerenza Bryson & Myles Pillage)
  - Men's Team winners: Great Britain (James Cooke, Thomas Toolis, & Joe Choong)
  - Women's Team winners: Great Britain (Kate French, Joanna Muir, & Francesca Summers)
- October 7 – 9: 2019 South American Senior & Junior Modern Pentathlon Championships in Buenos Aires
  - Note: The men's team relay results was not done properly.
  - Individual winners: (Chile) Esteban Bustos (m) / (Argentina) Ayelen Zapata (f)
  - Men's Team winners: Argentina (Vicente Lima, Emmanuel Zapata, & Leandro Corrandini)
  - Women's Team winners: Brazil (Isabela Abreu, Stephany Saraiva, & Priscila Oliveira)
- November 11 – 21: 2019 Asia-Oceania Modern Pentathlon Championships in (China) Kunming
- November 15 – 17: 2019 Pan American Junior & Youth Modern Pentathlon Championships in Guatemala City
- November 21 – 25: 2019 European U24 Modern Pentathlon Championships in (Poland) Drzonków
- November 28 – December 1: 2019 South American Youth Modern Pentathlon Championships (Tetrathlon) in (Uruguay) Montevideo

== 2019 Modern Pentathlon World Cup ==
- February 27 – March 3: MPWC #1 in Cairo
  - Individual winners: (Egypt) Ahmed El-Gendy (m) / (Russia) Uliana Batashova (f)
  - Mixed Team Relay winners: Egypt (Haydy Morsy & Ahmed El-Gendy)
- April 10 – 14: MPWC #2 in (Bulgaria) Sofia
  - Individual winners: (Mexico) Manuel Padilla (m) / (France) Marie Oteiza (f)
  - Mixed Team Relay winners: Poland (Marta Kobecka & Jaroslaw Swiderski)
- May 2 – 6: MPWC #3 in (Hungary) Székesfehérvár
  - Individual winners: (Germany) Christian Zillekens (m) / (Hungary) Tamara Alekszejev (f)
  - Mixed Team Relay winners: China (BIAN Yufei & HAN Jiahao)
- May 22 – 27: MPWC #4 in (Czech Republic) Prague
  - Individual winners: (Russia) Aleksander Lesun (m) / (United Kingdom) Kate French (f)
  - Mixed Team Relay winners: Great Britain (Joanna Muir & Samuel Curry)
- June 27 – 30: MPWC #5 (final) in (Japan) Tokyo
  - Individual winners: (United Kingdom) Joe Choong (m) / (Lithuania) Laura Asadauskaitė (f)
  - Mixed Team Relay winners: France (Valentin Prades & Élodie Clouvel)
