= Modern pentathlon at the 2015 Pan American Games =

- Modern pentathlon pictogram for the games
- Venue: CIBC Pan Am/Parapan Am Aquatics Centre and Field House
- Dates: July 18–19
- No. of events: 2 (1 men, 1 women)
- Competitors: 51 from 15 nations

Modern pentathlon competitions at the 2015 Pan American Games in Toronto was held on July 18 and 19 at the CIBC Pan Am/Parapan Am Aquatics Centre and Field House, where a temporary show jumping ring, pistol shooting range and cross-country course was constructed to host the final round of fencing, jumping and combined events. A total of two events (one for each gender) was contested.

The top placed North American and South American athlete, along with the next three best athletes in each event qualified for the 2016 Summer Olympics in Rio de Janeiro, Brazil.

== Competition schedule ==
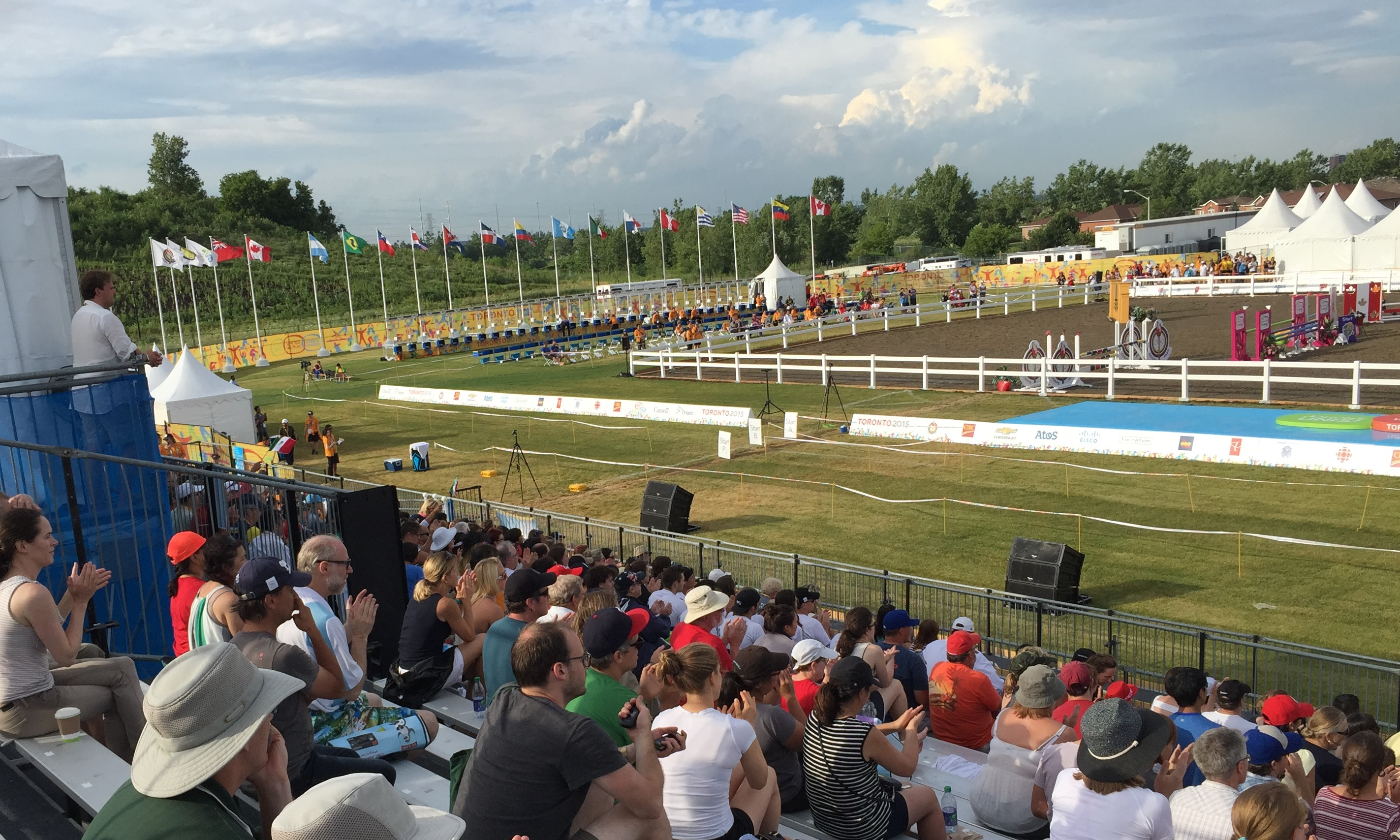
The Toronto Pan Am Sports Centre was the venue for modern pentathlon, including a temporary show jumping ring, pistol shooting range and cross-country course on the east side of the grounds

The following was the competition schedule for the modern pentathlon competitions:

F	Fencing, swimming, jumping, combined event

Event↓/Date →	Sat 18	Sun 19
Men's	F	
Women's		F

== Medal table ==
Rank	Nation	Gold	Silver	Bronze	Total
1	Brazil	1	0	0	1
1	Guatemala	1	0	0	1
3	Mexico	0	2	1	3
4	United States	0	0	1	1
Totals (4 entries)		2	2	2	6

== Medalists ==
Event	Gold	Silver	Bronze
Men's	Charles Fernandez; Guatemala	Ismael Hernández; Mexico	Nathan Schrimsher; United States
Women's	Yane Marques; Brazil	Tamara Vega; Mexico	Mayan Oliver; Mexico

== Participating nations ==
A total of 14 countries qualified athletes. The number of athletes a nation entered is in parentheses beside the name of the country.

- Argentina (4)
- Brazil (5)
- Canada (5)
- Chile (4)
- Costa Rica (1)
- Cuba (4)
- Dominican Republic (2)
- Ecuador (3)
- Guatemala (5)
- Mexico (5)
- Panama (2)
- Peru (3)
- United States (4)
- Uruguay (2)
- Venezuela (2)

== Qualification ==
A total of 50 modern pentathletes qualified to compete at the Games (28 male and 22 female). A nation was allowed to enter a maximum of six athletes (three male and three female). The host nation (Canada) was automatically qualified with a team of one athlete per gender, and could have qualified additional competitors.

== See also ==
- Modern pentathlon at the 2016 Summer Olympics
