= Modern pentathlon at the 2018 Central American and Caribbean Games =

- Venue: Club Campestre de Cali
- Location: (Colombia) Cali
- Dates: 20–23 July

The modern pentathlon competition at the 2018 Central American and Caribbean Games was held from 20 to 23 July at the Club Campestre de Cali in Cali, Colombia.

== Medal summary ==
Event	Gold		Silver		Bronze	
Men's individual	Charles Fernández (GUA)	1461	Manuel Padilla (MEX)	1449	Juan Pérez (MEX)	1432
Women's individual	Mayan Oliver (MEX)	1335	Sofia Cabrera (GUA)	1324	Tamara Vega (MEX)	1319
Men's relay	Cuba (CUB); Lester Ders; Raidel Orama	1495	Guatemala (GUA); Alejandro Santis; Jorge Imeri	1453	Dominican Republic (DOM); Bryan Almonte; Gabriel Domínguez	1431
Women's relay	Mexico (MEX); Tamara Vega; Mayan Oliver	1382	Guatemala (GUA); Ximena Diéguez; Sophia Hernández	1324	Cuba (CUB); Leidis Moya; Eliani Camara	1261
Mixed relay	Guatemala (GUA); Sofia Cabrera; Charles Fernández	1465	Mexico (MEX); Mariana Arceo; Manuel Padilla	1460	Cuba (CUB); Leidis Moya; José Figueroa	1307

== Medal table ==
Rank	Nation	Gold	Silver	Bronze	Total
1	Guatemala (GUA)	2	3	0	5
2	Mexico (MEX)	2	2	2	6
3	Cuba (CUB)	1	0	2	3
4	Dominican Republic (DOM)	0	0	1	1
Totals (4 entries)		5	5	5	15
