= Modern pentathlon at the 2023 Pan American Games – Mixed relay =

Mixed relay at the 2023 Pan American Games
- Venue: Las Condes Military School
- Dates: October 25
- Competitors: 24 from 12 nations
- Winning score: 1360

Medalists
Gold medal	Tamara Vega; Manuel Padilla	Mexico
Silver medal	Sol Naranjo; Andrés Torres	Ecuador
Bronze medal	Jessica Davis; Brendan Anderson	United States

The mixed relay competition of the modern pentathlon events at the 2023 Pan American Games was held on October 25 at Las Condes Military School in Chile.

== Schedule ==
Date	Time	Round
October 25, 2023	11:00	Fencing
October 25, 2023	14:30	Riding
October 25, 2023	15:15	Fencing Bonus Round
October 25, 2023	16:00	Swimming 200m Freestyle
October 25, 2023	16:30	Laser Run

== Results ==
Rank	Athlete	Nation	Fencing Victories (pts)	Swimming Time (pts)	Riding Time (pts)	Laser run Time (pts)	Score
1st place, gold medalist(s)	Tamara Vega; Manuel Padilla	Mexico	139.00 (264)	26 (230)	2:03.96 (303)	12:17 (563)	1360
2nd place, silver medalist(s)	Sol Naranjo; Andrés Torres	Ecuador	132.00 (288)	26 (234)	2:09.71 (291)	12:58 (522)	1335
3rd place, bronze medalist(s)	Jessica Davis; Brendan Anderson	United States	124.00 (282)	23 (218)	2:08.39 (294)	12:46 (534)	1328
4	Sofía Cabrera; Juan Ochoa	Independent Athletes Team	154.00 (225)	22 (214)	2:05.35 (300)	12:53 (527)	1266
5	Kelly Fitzsimmons; Quinn Schulz	Canada	132.20 (274)	27 (238)	2:02.51 (305)	14:49 (411)	1228
6	Isabela Abreu; William Muinhos	Brazil	158.00 (231)	26 (230)	2:08.10 (294)	13:49 (471)	1226
7	Cecilia Fermin; Gabriel Domínguez	Dominican Republic	121.00 (268)	20 (206)	2:08.06 (294)	15:00 (400)	1168
8	María José Bravo; Martín Gajardo	Chile	EL	19 (206)	2:11.39 (288)	13:11 (509)	1003
9	Delmis Pérez; Juan Pablo Velazquez	Cuba	EL	26 (230)	2:05.64 (299)	14:35 (425)	954
10	Osmaidy Arias; Albert Rivas	Venezuela	EL	14 (184)	2:05.66 (299)	14:00 (460)	943
11	Valentina La Cruz; Bryan Blanco	Paraguay	EL	14 (182)	2:11.92 (287)	14:34 (426)	895
12	María Belén Serrano; Emanuel Zapata	Argentina	142.00 (223)	21 (220)	EL	14:13 (447)	890
