= Modern pentathlon at the 2026 Central American and Caribbean Games =

- Venue: La Batalla de Las Carreras Military Academy
- Location: Santo Domingo, Dominican Republic
- Dates: 4 – 8 August

The modern pentathlon competition at the 2026 Central American and Caribbean Games was held in Santo Domingo, Dominican Republic, from 4 to 8 August 2026 at the La Batalla de Las Carreras Military Academy.

== Medal table ==
* Host nation (Dominican Republic)

Rank	Nation	Gold	Silver	Bronze	Total
1	Mexico (MEX)	2	3	1	6
2	Guatemala (GUA)	2	1	2	5
3	Venezuela (VEN)	1	1	2	4
Totals (3 entries)		5	5	5	15

== Medal summary ==
Event	Gold	Silver	Bronze
Men's individual	Duilio Carrillo; Mexico	Manuel Padilla; Mexico	Juan Ochoa; Guatemala
Women's individual	Sofía Cabrera; Guatemala	Catherine Oliver; Mexico	Osmaidy Arias; Venezuela
Men's relay	Guatemala; Marcos García; Juan Ochoa	Venezuela; Neiverson Quintana; Albert Rivas	Mexico; Duilio Carrillo; Manuel Padilla
Women's relay	Venezuela; Osmaidy Arias; Giraly Marcano	Mexico; Priscila Espinoza; Catherine Oliver	Guatemala; Sofía Cabrera; Sophia Hernández
Mixed relay	Mexico; Yael Marmolejo; Catherine Oliver	Guatemala; Sofía Cabrera; Juan Ochoa	Venezuela; Osmaidy Arias; Albert Rivas
