= Modern pentathlon at the 2015 Pan American Games – Men's =

Men's individual Modern pentathlon at the 2015 Pan American Games
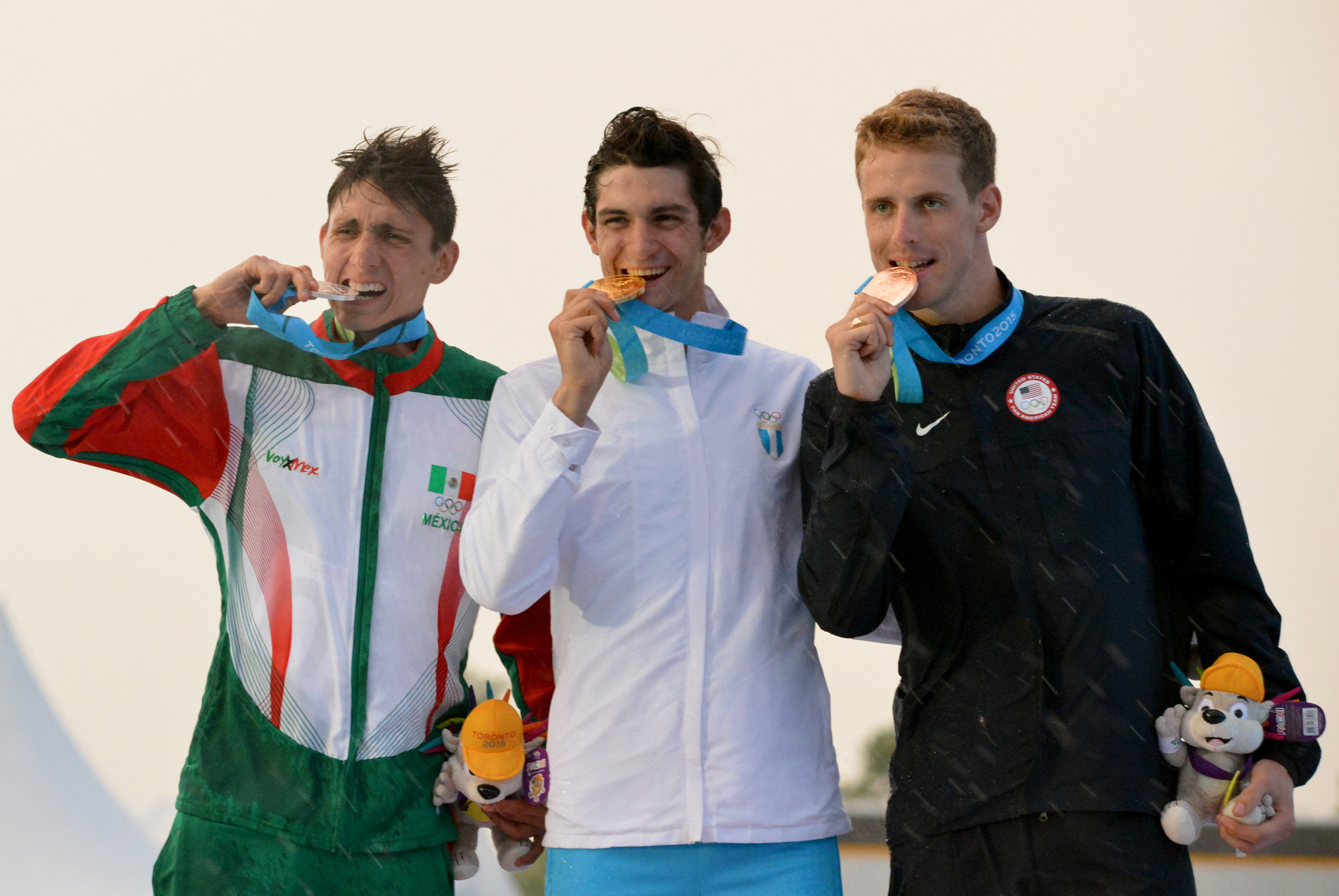
- Left-right:Hernández, Fernandez, Schrimsher
- Venue: CIBC Pan Am/Parapan Am Aquatics Centre and Field House
- Dates: July 19, 2015
- Competitors: 29 from 15 nations
- Winning score: 1444

Medalists
Gold medal	Charles Fernandez	Guatemala
Silver medal	Ismael Hernández	Mexico
Bronze medal	Nathan Schrimsher	United States

The men's Individual competition of the modern pentathlon events at the 2015 Pan American Games was held on July 19 at the CIBC Pan Am/Parapan Am Aquatics Centre and Field House.

The top placed North American and South American athlete, along with the next three best athletes in each event (maximum on per nation) will qualify for the 2016 Summer Olympics in Rio de Janeiro, Brazil.

== Format ==
For the second time at a Pan American Games, the modern pentathlon events will introduce laser shooting (as opposed to pistol shooting) and a combined shooting/running event. Athletes will compete first in epée fencing followed by swimming the 200 metre freestyle, thirdly in equestrian (jumping) and finally in the combined shooting/running event. The athlete that crosses the line first wins.

== Schedule ==
Date	Time	Round
July 19, 2015	9:45	Fencing
July 19, 2015	13:15	Swimming
July 19, 2015	14:15	Fencing bonus round
July 19, 2015	15:45	Equestrian
July 19, 2015	19:30	Combined shooting/running event

== Results ==
Qualified for the 2016 Summer Olympics

Rank	Athlete	Nation	Fencing Victories (pts)	Swimming Time (pts)	Equestrian Penalties (pts)	Combined Shooting/Running Time (pts)	Score
1st place, gold medalist(s)	Charles Fernandez	Guatemala	24 (282)	2:03.98 (329)	28 (272)	12:21.18 (559)	1444
2nd place, silver medalist(s)	Ismael Hernández	Mexico	19 (242)	2:01.66 (335)	21 (279)	11:58.18 (582)	1439
3rd place, bronze medalist(s)	Nathan Schrimsher	United States	19 (242)	2:00.59 (339)	14 (286)	12:27.28 (553)	1421
4	José Figueroa	Cuba	17 (226)	2:11.40 (306)	12 (288)	11:46.19 (594)	1415
5	Emmanuel Zapata	Argentina	18 (234)	2:06.37 (321)	9 (291)	12:14.87 (566)	1413
6	Esteban Bustos	Chile	17 (226)	2:07.70 (317)	28 (272)	11:55.46 (585)	1402
7	Felipe Nascimento	Brazil	17 (226)	2:07.57 (318)	18 (282)	12:41.32 (539)	1365
8	David Ruales	Ecuador	14 (202)	2:10.02 (310)	21 (279)	12:12.46 (568)	1359
9	Jorge Inzunza	Mexico	17 (226)	2:01.11 (337)	49 (251)	12:41.59 (539)	1355
10	Dennis Bowsher	United States	13 (194)	2:06.10 (322)	21 (279)	12:28.49 (552)	1348
11	Joshua Riker-Fox	Canada	14 (202)	2:10.21 (310)	35 (265)	12:14.51 (566)	1347
12	Jorge Imeri Cabrera	Guatemala	14 (202)	2:08.52 (315)	16 (284)	12:52.58 (528)	1329
13	Garnett Stevens	Canada	12 (186)	2:05.91 (323)	7 (293)	13:17.40 (503)	1305
14	Sergio Villamayor	Argentina	18 (234)	2:19.72 (281)	65 (235)	12:36.89 (544)	1294
15	Yaniel Velázquez	Cuba	14 (202)	2:06.92 (320)	28 (272)	13:57.55 (463)	1257
16	Arturo Sulbaran	Venezuela	15 (210)	2:06.24 (322)	86 (214)	13:32.43 (488)	1236
17	Jose Guitian	Panama	13 (194)	2:28.16 (256)	24 (276)	13:57.82 (463)	1189
18	Alvaro Sandoval	Mexico	22 (266)	2:05.49 (324)	EL (0)	12:15.75 (565)	1156
19	Julio Luna	Venezuela	10 (170)	2:09.99 (311)	85 (215)	14:09.51 (451)	1147
20	Fabián Ramírez	Costa Rica	9 (162)	2:15.51 (294)	37 (263)	15:06.52 (394)	1114
21	Alex Hernández	Dominican Republic	9 (162)	2:22.32 (274)	23 (277)	15:11.78 (389)	1110
22	Danilo Fagundes	Brazil	15 (210)	2:09.17 (313)	EL (0)	12:29.72 (551)	1074
23	Luis Siri	Uruguay	9 (162)	2:30.29 (250)	28 (272)	15:19.03 (381)	1065
24	Nelson Torres	Ecuador	11 (178)	2:07.37 (318)	EL (0)	13:35.93 (485)	981
25	Carlos Barrios	Peru	5 (130)	3:09.83 (131)	25 (275)	14:30.03 (430)	966
26	Martin Gajardo	Chile	7 (146)	2:07.44 (318)	EL (0)	13:50.15 (470)	935
27	Missael Aguilar	Panama	13 (194)	2:48.77 (194)	DNS (0)	15:22.09 (378)	766
28	Fernando Rodríguez	Dominican Republic	12 (186)	2:31.98 (245)	EL (0)	16:20.27 (320)	751
29	Jeffrey Leyva	Peru	6 (138)	2:45.73 (203)	EL (0)	16:49.11 (291)	633
