= Modern pentathlon at the 2023 Pan American Games – Women's relay =

Women's relay at the 2023 Pan American Games
- Venue: Las Condes Military School
- Dates: October 26
- Competitors: 20 from 10 nations
- Winning score: 1283

Medalists
Gold medal	Catherine Oliver; Mayan Oliver	Mexico
Silver medal	Paula Valencia; Sophia Hernández	Independent Athletes Team
Bronze medal	Devan Wiebe; Kelly Fitzsimmons	Canada

The women's relay competition of the modern pentathlon events at the 2023 Pan American Games was held on October 26 at Las Condes Military School in Chile.

== Schedule ==
Date	Time	Round
October 26, 2023	11:00	Fencing
October 26, 2023	14:30	Riding
October 26, 2023	15:15	Fencing Bonus Round
October 26, 2023	16:00	Swimming 200m Freestyle
October 26, 2023	16:30	Laser Run

== Results ==
Rank	Athlete	Nation	Fencing Victories (pts)	Swimming Time (pts)	Riding Time (pts)	Laser run Time (pts)	Score
1st place, gold medalist(s)	Catherine Oliver; Mayan Oliver	Mexico	139.80 (264)	26 (255)	2:19.12 (272)	13:28 (492)	1283
2nd place, silver medalist(s)	Paula Valencia; Sophia Hernández	Independent Athletes Team	142.00 (237)	22 (235)	2:12.34 (286)	13:59 (461)	1219
3rd place, bronze medalist(s)	Devan Wiebe; Kelly Fitzsimmons	Canada	140.00 (2439	16 (205)	2:23.59 (263)	14:15 (445)	1155
4	Rocío Varela; María José Bravo	Chile	155.00 (234)	14 (195)	2:29.47 (252)	15:37 (363)	1044
5	María Belén Serrano; Camila Fuenzalida	Argentina	EL	22 (239)	2:15.88 (279)	14:!8 (442)	960
6	Stephany Saraiva; Isabela Abreu	Brazil	EL	21 (234)	2:18.07 (274)	14:09 (451)	959
7	Heidi Hendrick; Phaelen French	United States	EL	15 (204)	2:15.55 (279)	14:20 (440)	923
8	Dara Salazar; Sol Naranjo	Ecuador	EL	17 (212)	2:24.45 (262)	14:30 (430)	904
9	Delmis Pérez; Diana Leyva	Cuba	EL	12 (185)	2:10.28 (290)	14:37 (423)	898
10	Cecilia Fermin; Ana Leydis Arias	Dominican Republic	EL	13 (194)	2:24.15 (262)	15:24 (376)	832
