= Modern pentathlon at the 2019 Pan American Games =

- Modern pentathlon pictogram
- Venue: Military School of Chorrillos
- Dates: July 27–30, 2019
- Competitors: 64 from 16 nations

Modern pentathlon competitions at the 2019 Pan American Games in Lima, Peru were held between July 27 and 30, 2019 at the Military School of Chorrillos.

Five medal events were contested. Two were individual events, one per gender. A further three events (men, women and mixed) in the relay format were contested, after the Panamsports added them to the sports program.

The top two athletes from North American and South America, along with the next highest non-qualified athlete qualified for the 2020 Summer Olympics in Tokyo, Japan.

== Medal table ==
Rank	Nation	Gold	Silver	Bronze	Total
1	United States	2	2	0	4
2	Mexico	2	0	0	2
3	Guatemala	1	0	1	2
4	Cuba	0	2	1	3
5	Chile	0	1	0	1
6	Argentina	0	0	2	2
7	Brazil	0	0	1	1
Totals (7 entries)		5	5	5	15

== Medalists ==
Event	Gold	Silver	Bronze
Men's individual	Charles Fernandez; Guatemala	Esteban Bustos; Chile	Sergio Villamayor; Argentina
Men's relay	Mexico; Duilio Carrillo; José Melchor Silva	United States; Brendan Anderson; Amro El-Geziry	Argentina; Sergio Villamayor; Emmanuel Zapata
Women's individual	Mariana Arceo; Mexico	Samantha Achterberg; United States	Leydi Moya; Cuba
Women's relay	United States; Samantha Achterberg; Jessia Davis	Cuba; Elani Camara Rodriguez; Leydi Moya	Brazil; Isabela Abreu; Priscila Oliveira
Mixed relay	United States; Amro El-Geziry; Isabella Isaksen	Cuba; Jose Ricardo Figueroa; Leydi Moya	Guatemala; María Diéguez; Charles Fernandez

== Qualification ==
A total of 64 Modern pentathletes qualified to compete. Each nation was allowed to enter a maximum of six athletes (three per gender). Quotas were awarded across three qualification tournaments. The host nation, Peru, automatically qualified four athletes (two per gender).

== See also ==
- Modern pentathlon at the 2020 Summer Olympics
