= Modern pentathlon at the 2023 Central American and Caribbean Games =

- Venue: Centro Olímpico Juan Pablo Duarte
- Location: (Dominican Republic) Santo Domingo
- Dates: 24 June 2023 – 4 July 2023

The modern pentathlon competition at the 2023 Central American and Caribbean Games was held from 24 June 2023 to 4 July 2023 at the Centro Olímpico Juan Pablo Duarte in Santo Domingo, Dominican Republic.

== Medal table ==
* Host nation (El Salvador)

Rank	Nation	Gold	Silver	Bronze	Total
1	Mexico (MEX)	5	2	0	7
2	Centro Caribe Sports (CCS)	0	2	2	4
3	Cuba (CUB)	0	1	3	4
Totals (3 entries)		5	5	5	15

== Medal summary ==
Event	Gold		Silver		Bronze	
Men's individual	Emiliano Hernández (MEX)	1503	Duilio Carrillo (MEX)	1493	Lester Ders (CUB)	1467
Women's individual	Mayan Oliver (MEX)	1391	Mariana Arceo (MEX)	1365	Sophia Hernandez (CCS)	1346
Men's relay	Mexico (MEX); Emiliano Hernández; Manuel Padilla	1442	Cuba (CUB); Lester Ders; Marcos Rojas	1395	Centro Caribe Sports (CCS); Jose Miguel Molina; Andrés Fernández	1348
Women's relay	Mexico (MEX); Catherine Oliver; Mayan Oliver	1284	Centro Caribe Sports (CCS); Sophia Hernandez; Sofia Cabrera	1266	Cuba (CUB); Diana Leyva; Delmis Perez	1216
Mixed relay	Mexico (MEX); Mariana Arceo; Duilio Carrillo	1357	Centro Caribe Sports (CCS); Sophia Hernández; Andrés Fernández	1313	Cuba (CUB); Diana Leyva; Juan Pablo Velázquez	1279
