= Modern pentathlon at the 2015 Pan American Games – Women's =

Women's individual Modern pentathlon at the 2015 Pan American Games
- Venue: CIBC Pan Am/Parapan Am Aquatics Centre and Field House
- Dates: July 18, 2015
- Competitors: 22 from 11 nations
- Winning score: 1348

Medalists
Gold medal	Yane Marques	Brazil
Silver medal	Tamara Vega	Mexico
Bronze medal	Mayan Oliver	Mexico

The women's Individual competition of the modern pentathlon events at the 2015 Pan American Games was held on July 18 at the CIBC Pan Am/Parapan Am Aquatics Centre and Field House.

The top placed North American and South American athlete, along with the next three best athletes in each event (maximum one per country) will qualify for the 2016 Summer Olympics in Rio de Janeiro, Brazil.

== Format ==
For the second time at a Pan American Games, the modern pentathlon events will introduce laser shooting (as opposed to pistol shooting) and a combined shooting/running event. Athletes will compete first in epée fencing followed by swimming the 200 metre freestyle, thirdly in equestrian (jumping) and finally in the combined shooting/running event. The athlete that crosses the line first wins.

== Schedule ==
Date	Time	Round
July 18, 2015	11:15	Fencing
July 18, 2015	14:15	Swimming
July 18, 2015	15:15	Fencing bonus round
July 18, 2015	16:55	Equestrian
July 18, 2015	19:00	Combined shooting/running event

== Results ==
Qualified for the 2016 Summer Olympics

Rank	Athlete	Nation	Fencing Victories (pts)	Swimming Time (pts)	Equestrian Penalties (pts)	Combined Shooting/Running Time (pts)	Score
1st place, gold medalist(s)	Yane Marques	Brazil	18 (279)	2:12.18 (304)	14 (286)	13:41.25 (479)	1348
2nd place, silver medalist(s)	Tamara Vega	Mexico	15 (252)	2:16.55 (291)	10 (290)	13:06.39 (514)	1347
3rd place, bronze medalist(s)	Mayan Oliver	Mexico	12 (224)	2:26.20 (262)	7 (293)	12:52.46 (528)	1307
4	Donna Vakalis	Canada	11 (214)	2:22.42 (273)	24 (276)	12:44.83 (536)	1299
5	Melanie McCann	Canada	13 (232)	2:20.67 (278)	1 (299)	13:38.27 (482)	1291
6	Isabel Brand	Guatemala	14 (242)	2:23.91 (269)	21 (279)	13:32.83 (488)	1278
7	Leydi Moya	Cuba	13 (234)	2:17.19 (289)	29 (271)	13:46.36 (474)	1268
8	Margaux Isaksen	United States	10 (206)	2:15.54 (294)	33 (267)	13:38.17 (482)	1249
9	Pamela Zapata	Argentina	7 (174)	2:24.70 (266)	10 (290)	13:19.72(501)	1235
10	Ayelen Zapata	Argentina	8 (187)	2:34.86 (236)	0 (300)	13:14.40 (506)	1229
11	Samantha Achterberg	United States	6 (169)	2:18.53 (285)	7 (293)	13:47.32 (473)	1220
12	Javiera Rosas	Chile	12 (217)	2:16.46 (291)	21 (279)	14:30.43 (430)	1217
13	Larissa Lellys	Brazil	10 (206)	2:17.84 (287)	10 (290)	14:28.23 (432)	1215
14	Priscila Oliveira	Brazil	11 (214)	2:18.23 (286)	42 (258)	14:25.67 (435)	1193
15	Sophia Hernandez	Guatemala	16 (259)	2:30.31 (250)	19 (281)	15:11.04 (389)	1179
16	Hillary Elliott	Canada	12 (224)	2:21.11 (277)	49 (251)	15:14.78 (386)	1138
17	Loreto Gajardo	Chile	6 (162)	2:19.74 (281)	3 (297)	15:06.80 (394)	1134
18	Ximena Dieguez	Guatemala	7 (182)	2:31.83 (245)	7 (293)	15:01.76 (399)	1119
19	Blanca Kometter	Peru	8 (177)	2:27.09 (259)	51 (249)	16:51.69 (289)	974
20	Ilianny Manzano	Cuba	9 (196)	2:31.48 (246)	DNS (0)	15:13.34 (387)	829
21	Dashalia Mendoza	Ecuador	11 (214)	2:19.89 (281)	EL (0)	16:34.33 (306)	801
22	Yoselin Pedragosa	Uruguay	2 (133)	2:52.04 (184)	DNS (0)	16:49.94 (291)	608
