= Sophia Hernández =

Guatemalan modern pentathlete

Personal information
- Full name: Ana Sophia Hernández Cuéllar
- Nationality: Guatemalan
- Born: 14 January 1997 (age 29) Guatemala City
- Height: 1.62 m (5 ft 4 in)
- Weight: 52 kg (115 lb)

Sport
- Country: Guatemala
- Sport: Modern pentathlon
Medal record
Women's modern pentathlon
Representing Guatemala
World Championships
Bronze medal – third place	2018 Mexico City	Relay
Bronze medal – third place	2024 Zhengzhou	Relay
Central American and Caribbean Games
Gold medal – first place	2014 Veracruz	Relay
Silver medal – second place	2018 Cali	Relay
Representing Independent Athletes Team
Pan American Games
Silver medal – second place	2023 Santiago	Relay
Bronze medal – third place	2023 Santiago	Individual
Representing Centro Caribe Sports
Central American and Caribbean Games
Silver medal – second place	2023 Santo Domingo	Relay
Silver medal – second place	2023 Santo Domingo	Mixed relay
Bronze medal – third place	2023 Santo Domingo	Individual

Ana Sophia Hernández Cuéllar (born 14 January 1997) is a Guatemalan modern pentathlete. She is a two-time World Championships bronze medalist and a two-time Pan American Games medalist.

== Career ==
Hernández began competing in the modern pentathlon when she was nine years old after her mother wanted to take up swimming but discovered the pentathlon instead.

Hernández won a gold medal in the team relay at the 2014 Central American and Caribbean Games. She then represented Guatemala at the 2015 Pan American Games and finished 15th in the individual event, meaning she did not qualify for the 2016 Summer Olympics. She competed at the 2016 World Championships in the individual event but did not advance beyong the group stage.

At the 2018 Central American and Caribbean Games, Hernández won a silver medal in the relay. She competed alongside Sofía Cabrera at the 2018 World Championships, and they won the bronze medal in the relay. She did not qualify for the 2020 Summer Olympics.

Hernández competed for the Centro Caribe Sports flag at the 2023 Central American and Caribbean Games, as the Guatemalan Olympic Committee was suspended. She won a silver medal in the women's relay event alongside Cabrera and a silver medal in the mixed relay event. She also won the individual bronze medal, behind Mexican athletes Mayan Oliver and Mariana Arceo. She then competed at the 2023 Pan American Games and won the bronze medal in the individual event and earned a quota for the 2024 Summer Olympics. She was the first Guatemalan pentathlete to win an individual medal at the Pan American Games. Additionally, she won a silver medal in the relay event.

Hernández represented Guatemala at the 2024 Summer Olympics in the individual modern pentathlon. She finished 16th in semifinal B and did not advance into the final. She competed with Cabrera in the relay event at the 2024 World Championships, winning a bronze medal.
