= 2012 in modern pentathlon =

This article lists the main modern pentathlon events and their results for 2012.

== 2012 Summer Olympics (UIPM) ==
- August 11 & 12: 2012 Summer Olympics in (United Kingdom) London at the Copper Box Arena, the London Aquatics Centre, & Greenwich Park
  - Men: (gold) (Czech Republic) David Svoboda; (silver) (China) Cao Zhongrong; (bronze) (Hungary) Ádám Marosi
  - Women: (gold) (Lithuania) Laura Asadauskaitė; (silver) (United Kingdom) Samantha Murray; (bronze) (Brazil) Yane Marques

== World modern pentathlon events ==
- May 7 – 13: 2012 World Modern Pentathlon Championships in Rome
  - Individual winners: (Russia) Aleksander Lesun (m) / (United Kingdom) Mhairi Spence (f)
  - Men's Team Relay winners: South Korea (Jung Jin-hwa, HONG Jin-woo, & Hwang Woo-jin)
  - Women's Team Relay winners: Germany (Lena Schöneborn, Janine Kohlmann, & Annika Schleu)
  - Mixed Team Relay winners: Ukraine (Ganna Buriak & Oleksandr Mordasov)
  - Men's Team winners: Italy (Riccardo De Luca, Nicola Benedetti, & Pier Paolo Petroni)
  - Women's Team winners: Great Britain (Heather Fell, Samantha Murray, & Mhairi Spence)
- September 3 – 8: 2012 World Junior Modern Pentathlon Championships in (Poland) Drzonków
  - Junior Individual winners: (France) Valentin Belaud (m) / (United States) Margaux Isaksen (f)
  - Junior Men's Team Relay winners: South Korea (Kim Dae-beom, KIM Soeng-jin, & KIM Kyeong-pil)
  - Junior Women's Team Relay winners: United States (Samantha Achterberg, Margaux Isaksen, & Isabella Isaksen)
  - Junior Mixed Team Relay winners: Latvia (Olga Sislova & Pavels Svecovs)
  - Junior Men's Team winners: Russia (Ilya Shugarov, Dmitry Lukach, & Maksim Kustov)
  - Junior Women's Team winners: United States (Samantha Achterberg, Isabella Isaksen, & Margaux Isaksen)
- September 19 – 23: 2012 World Youth Modern Pentathlon Championships in Tata
  - Youth Individual winners: (Russia) Oleg Naumov (m) / (Lithuania) Ieva Serapinaitė (f)
  - Youth Men's Team Relay winners: Germany (Fabian Liebig, Marvin Faly Dogue, & Christian Zillekens)
  - Youth Women's Team Relay winners: Russia (Ekaterina Makarova, Elizabet Rodriguez, & Sofia Serkina)
  - Youth Mixed Team Relay winners: Russia (Ekaterina Vdovenko & Oleg Naumov)
  - Youth Men's Team winners: Hungary (Norbert Horvath, Krisztián Strobl, & Tamas Bence Frohlich)
  - Youth Women's Team winners: Russia (Ekaterina Vdovenko, Ekaterina Makarova, & Sofia Serkina)

== Continental modern pentathlon events ==
- June 6 – 13: 2012 European Junior Modern Pentathlon Championships in (Hungary) Székesfehérvár
  - Junior Individual winners: (Lithuania) Lukas Kontrimavicius (m) / (Hungary) Sarolta Kovács (f)
  - Junior Men's Team Relay winners: Russia (Maksim Kustov, Dmitry Lukach, & Danil Kalimullin)
  - Junior Women's Team Relay winners: Great Britain (Rebecca Wain, Kerry Prise, & Kate French)
  - Junior Mixed Team Relay winners: France (Adele Stern & Valentin Belaud)
  - Junior Men's Team winners: Russia (Ilya Shugarov, Dmitry Lukach, & Maksim Kustov)
  - Junior Women's Team winners: Russia (Nadezhda Popova, Angelina Marochkina, & Svetlana Lebedeva)
- July 4 – 10: 2012 European Modern Pentathlon Championships in (Bulgaria) Sofia
  - Individual winners: (Italy) Riccardo De Luca (m) / (Lithuania) Laura Asadauskaitė (f)
  - Men's Team Relay winners: Russia (Ilia Frolov, Sergey Karyakin, & Alexander Savkin)
  - Women's Team Relay winners: Russia (Svetlana Lebedeva, Donata Rimšaitė, & Anna Savchenko)
  - Mixed Team Relay winners: Belarus (Anastasiya Prokopenko & Mihail Prokopenko)
  - Men's Team winners: Russia (Ilia Frolov, Andrey Moiseyev, & Aleksander Lesun)
  - Women's Team winners: Russia (Evdokia Gretchichnikova, Ekaterina Khuraskina, & Donata Rimšaitė)
- July 18 – 23: 2012 European Youth "A" Modern Pentathlon Championships in (Bulgaria) Sofia
  - Youth Individual winners: (Austria) Sebastian Reder (m) / (Belarus) Tatsiana Rahachova (f)
  - Youth Men's Team Relay winners: Hungary (Tamas Bence Frohlich, Krisztian Strobl, & Norbert Horvath)
  - Youth Women's Team Relay winners: France (Marie Oteiza, Pulcherie Delhalle, & Julie Belhamri)
  - Youth Mixed Team Relay winners: (Poland) Paula Markowska & (Russia) Oleg Naumov)
  - Youth Men's Team winners: Hungary (Norbert Horvath, Krisztian Strobl, & Tamas Bence Frohlich)
  - Youth Women's Team winners: France (Manon Barbaza, Marie Oteiza, & Pulcherie Delhalle)
- August 16 – 18: 2012 European Youth "B" Modern Pentathlon Championships in (Poland) Warsaw
  - Youth Individual winners: (Russia) Alexandr Stepachev (m) / (United Kingdom) Eilidh Prise (f)
  - Youth Men's Team Relay winners: Russia (Alexandr Stepachev, Danila Glavatskikh, & Serge Baranov)
  - Youth Women's Team Relay winners: Hungary (Anna Zs. Toth, Rebeka Ormandi, & Beáta Jozan)
  - Youth Mixed Team Relay winners: Great Britain (Eilidh Prise & Henry Choong)
  - Youth Men's Team winners: Russia (Serge Baranov, Danila Glavatskikh, & Alexandr Stepachev)
  - Youth Women's Team winners: Great Britain (Naomi Craig, Francesca Summers, & Eilidh Prise)
- October 2 – 7: 2012 Pan American & South American Modern Pentathlon Championships in Buenos Aires
  - Individual winners: (Mexico) Jorge Abraham Camacho (m) / (Brazil) Yane Marques (f)
  - Men's Team winners: Argentina (Nestor Villamayor, José Pereyra, & Emmanuel Zapata)
  - Women's Team winners: Argentina (Evelyn Prantera, Jessica Plaza, & Barbara Cordero)
- October 31 – November 4: 2012 Asian Modern Pentathlon Championships in (Chinese Taipei) Kaohsiung
  - Individual #1 winners: (South Korea) Jun Woong-tae (m) / (South Korea) HAN Song-yi (f)
  - Individual #2 winners: (South Korea) Kim Dae-beom (m) / (China) ZHU Wenjing (f)

== 2012 Modern Pentathlon World Cup ==
- March 8 – 11: MPWC #1 in (United States) Charlotte
  - Individual winners: (Russia) Ilia Frolov (m) / (Germany) Lena Schöneborn (f)
- March 15 – 18: MPWC #2 in (Brazil) Rio de Janeiro
  - Individual winners: (Russia) Aleksander Lesun (m) / (France) Élodie Clouvel (f)
- April 12 – 15: MPWC #3 in (Hungary) Százhalombatta
  - Individual winners: (Italy) Nicola Benedetti (m) / (France) Amélie Cazé (f)
- April 19 – 22: MPWC #4 in (Russia) Rostov
  - Individual winners: (Russia) Ilya Shugarov (m) / (Belarus) Anastasiya Prokopenko (f)
- May 26 & 27: MPWC #5 (final) in (China) Chengdu
  - Individual winners: (Russia) Ilia Frolov (m) / (Lithuania) Laura Asadauskaitė (f)
