= Emad El Geziry =

Egyptian modern pentathlete (born 1981)

Emad El Geziry OLY
Personal information
- Native name: عماد عبدالرحمن على الجزيري
- Full name: Emad Abdulrahman Ali El-Geziry
- Nationality: Egyptian
- Born: 14 November 1981 (age 44) Cairo, Egypt
- Height: 182 cm (6 ft 0 in)
- Weight: 73 kg (161 lb)

Sport
- Country: Egypt
- Sport: Modern pentathlon

Emad El Geziry (Egyptian Arabic: عماد الجزيرى; born 14 November 1981) is an Egyptian modern pentathlete. At age 18, he competed for Egypt at the 2000 Summer Olympics. His brothers, Omar and Amro, are also Olympic pentathletes.
