= Omar El Geziry =

Egyptian modern pentathlete (born 1985)

Omar El Geziry OLY
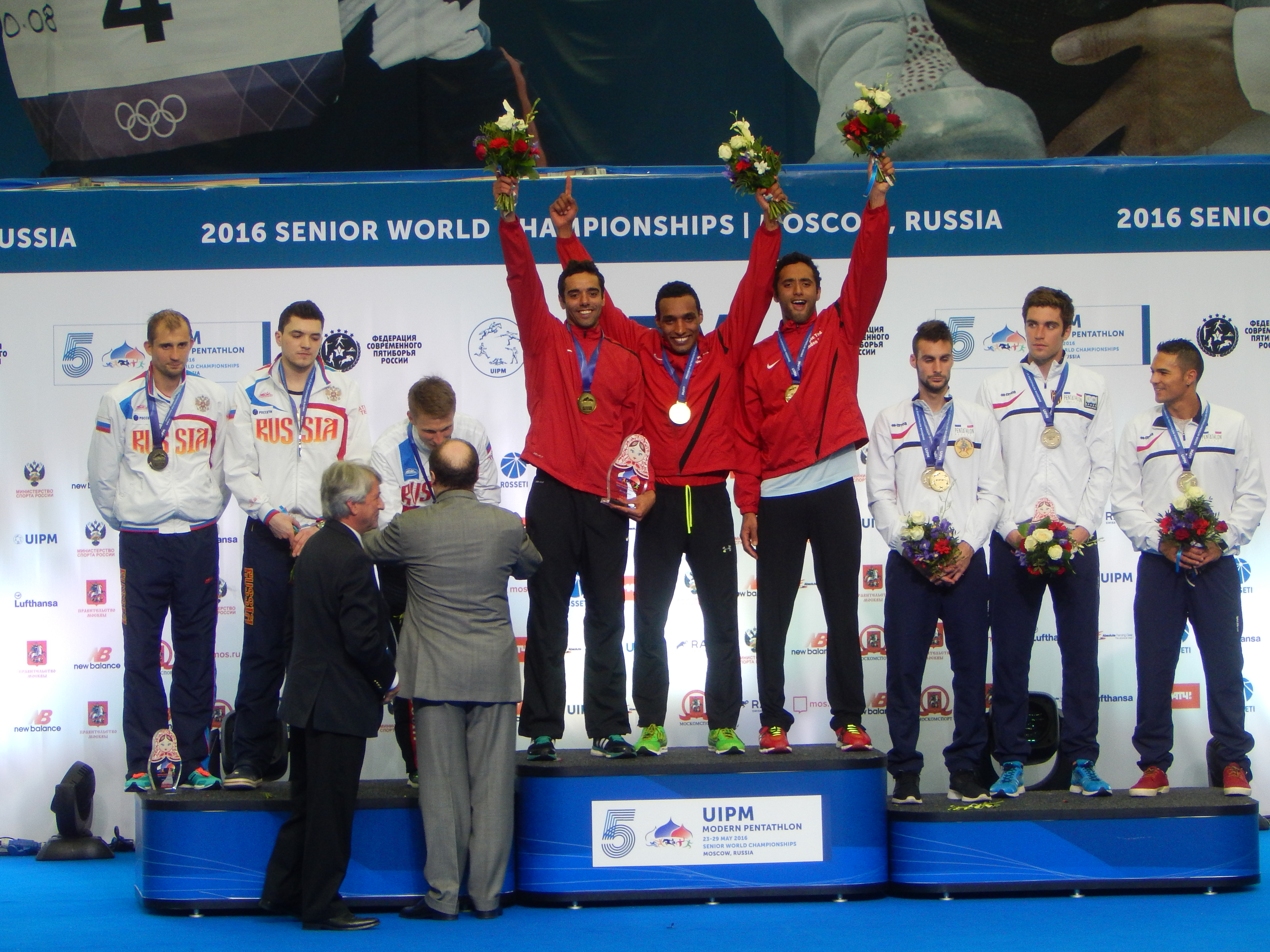
- Team Egypt (Omar El Geziry, Amro El Geziry, Yasser Hefny) wins gold in team competition Moscow, World Championships 2016

Personal information
- Native name: عمر عبدالرحمن على الجزيري
- Full name: Omar Abdulrahman Ali El-Geziry
- Nationality: Egyptian
- Born: 20 January 1985 (age 41) Cairo, Egypt
- Height: 185 cm (6 ft 1 in)
- Weight: 77 kg (170 lb)

Sport
- Country: Egypt
- Sport: Modern pentathlon

Omar El Geziry (Egyptian Arabic: عمر الجزيرى; born 20 January 1985) is an Egyptian modern pentathlete. He also had brothers who are pentathletes, namely Emad and Amro. He and Amro competed for Egypt at the 2016 Summer Olympics in the men's event.

He is currently the head fencing coach at Duke University.
