= Modern pentathlon at the 2023 Pan American Games =

- Modern Pentathlon pictogram
- Venue: Las Condes Military School
- Start date: October 21, 2023
- End date: October 27, 2023
- No. of events: 5 (2 men, 2 women, 1 mixed)
- Competitors: 66 from 14 nations

Modern pentathlon competitions at the 2023 Pan American Games in Santiago, Chile were held between October 21 and 27, 2023 at the Las Condes Military School.

5 medal events were contested: two individual events (one per gender) and three relay events (men, women and mixed).

The top two athletes from North America and South America in the individual event, along with the next highest non-qualified athlete, qualified for the 2024 Summer Olympics in Paris, France.

== Qualification system ==
A total of 66 modern pentathletes qualified to compete. Each nation could enter a maximum of 6 athletes (three per gender), except for the winners of the individual events at the 2021 Junior Pan American Games. Quotas were awarded across two qualification tournaments. The host nation, Chile, automatically qualified four athletes (two per gender). Two quotas (one per gender) were distributed via the 2021 Junior Pan American Games. The remaining quotas were awarded during the 2022 Pan American Championships, with up to three athletes per gender per country.

== Medal summary ==
=== Medal table ===
* Host nation (Chile)

Rank	NOC	Gold	Silver	Bronze	Total
1	Mexico	5	2	0	7
2	Ecuador	0	1	2	3
3	Independent Athletes Team	0	1	1	2
3	United States	0	1	1	2
5	Canada	0	0	1	1
Totals (5 entries)		5	5	5	15

=== Medalists ===
Event	Gold	Silver	Bronze
Men's individual	Emiliano Hernández; Mexico	Duilio Carrillo; Mexico	Andrés Torres; Ecuador
Men's relay	Mexico; Emiliano Hernández; Duilio Carrillo	United States; Tristen Bell; Brendan Anderson	Ecuador; Bayardo Naranjo; Andrés Torres
Women's individual	Mayan Oliver; Mexico	Catherine Oliver; Mexico	Sophia Hernández; Independent Athletes Team
Women's relay	Mexico; Catherine Oliver; Mayan Oliver	Independent Athletes Team; Paula Valencia; Sophia Hernández	Canada; Kelly Fitzsimmons; Devan Wiebe
Mixed relay	Mexico; Tamara Vega; Manuel Padilla	Ecuador; Sol Naranjo; Andrés Torres	United States; Jessica Davis; Brendan Anderson

== See also ==
- Modern pentathlon at the 2024 Summer Olympics
