= Samantha Schultz =

American modern pentathlete (born 1992)

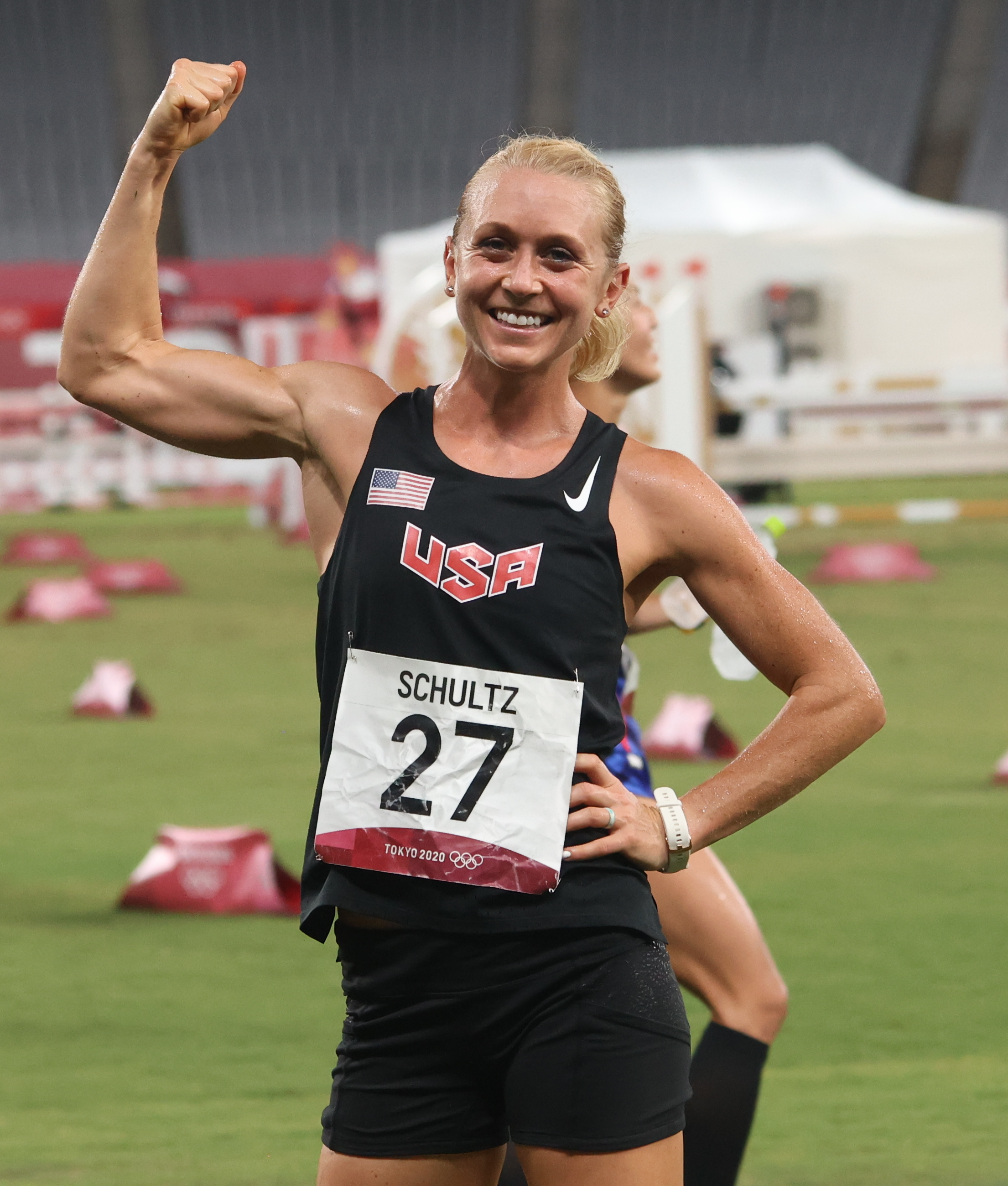
- Schultz at the 2020 Summer Olympic Games

Personal information
- Nickname: "Sammy"
- Born: March 27, 1992 (age 34) Denver, Colorado, U.S.
- Height: 5 ft 6 in (168 cm)

Sport
- Club: U.S. Army WCAP
Medal record
Women's modern pentathlon
Representing United States
Pan American Games
Gold medal – first place	2019 Lima	Relay
Silver medal – second place	2019 Lima	Individual

Samantha Schultz (née Achterberg, born March 27, 1992) is an American modern pentathlete. She won the silver medal in the women's individual event at the 2019 Pan American Games held in Lima, Peru. Achterberg and Jessica Davis also won the gold medal in the women's relay event.

In 2015, she competed in the women's individual event at the Pan American Games held in Toronto, Canada without winning a medal. In 2016, she competed at the World Modern Pentathlon Championships held in Moscow, Russia.

She represented the United States at the 2020 Summer Olympics in Tokyo, Japan. She competed in the women's event.

She is a sergeant in the United States Army Reserves.
