= Sergio Villamayor =

Argentine modern pentathlete (born 1989)

Personal information
- Born: 4 December 1989 (age 36) Formosa, Argentina

Sport
- Country: Argentina
- Sport: Modern pentathlon
Medal record
Men's modern pentathlon
Representing Argentina
Pan American Games
Bronze medal – third place	2019 Lima	Individual
Bronze medal – third place	2019 Lima	Relay

Sergio Villamayor (born 4 December 1989) is an Argentine modern pentathlete. He won the bronze medal in the men's individual event at the 2019 Pan American Games held in Lima, Peru. He also won the bronze medal in the men's relay event, alongside Emmanuel Zapata. He qualified to represent Argentina at the 2020 Summer Olympics in Tokyo, Japan.

In 2011, he competed in the men's individual event at the Pan American Games held in Guadalajara, Mexico without winning a medal. Four years later, in 2015, he competed in the men's individual event at the Pan American Games held in Toronto, Canada, also without winning a medal.
