= Mariana Arceo =

Mexican modern pentathlete (born 1994)

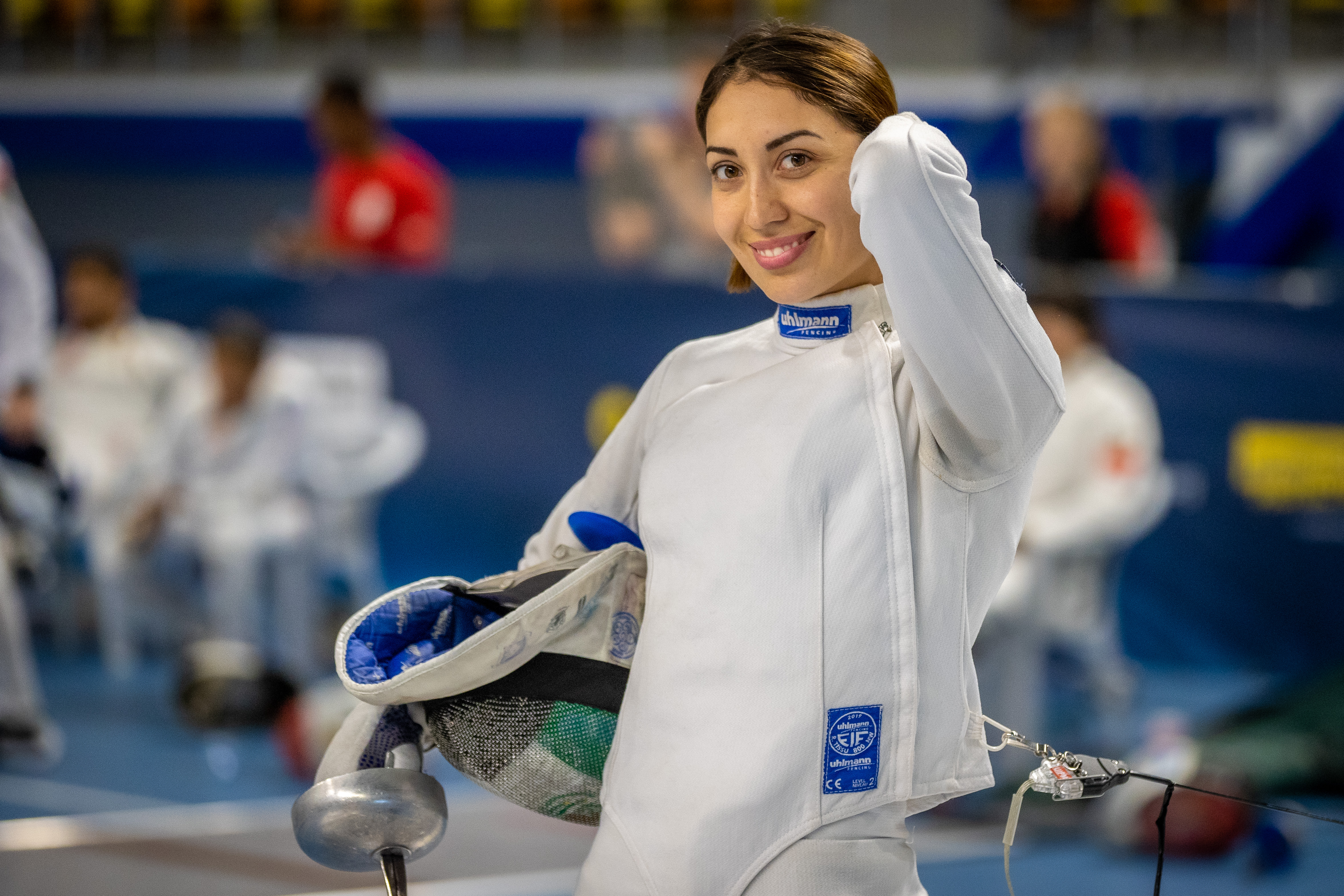
- Arceo in 2023

Personal information
- Full name: Mariana Arceo Gutiérrez
- Born: 25 April 1994 (age 32) Guadalajara, Mexico

Sport
- Country: Mexico
- Sport: Modern pentathlon
Medal record
Representing Mexico
Women's modern pentathlon
World Championships
Gold medal – first place	2019 Budapest	Relay
Silver medal – second place	2022 Alexandria	Relay
Bronze medal – third place	2023 Bath	Relay
Bronze medal – third place	2024 Zhengzhou	Team
Pan American Games
Gold medal – first place	2019 Lima	Individual
Central American and Caribbean Games
Gold medal – first place	2023 Santo Domingo	Mixed relay
Silver medal – second place	2018 Cali	Mixed relay
Silver medal – second place	2023 Santo Domingo	Individual
Women's laser-run
World Championships
Silver medal – second place	2024 Zhengzhou	Mixed relay

Mariana Arceo Gutiérrez (Note: In this Spanish name, the first or paternal surname is Arceo and the second or maternal family name is Gutiérrez.) (born 25 April 1994) is a Mexican modern pentathlete. She represented Mexico at the 2019 Pan American Games in Lima, Peru and she won the gold medal in the women's individual event.

She represented Mexico at the 2020 Summer Olympics in Tokyo, Japan. She competed in the women's event.

At the 2019 World Modern Pentathlon Championships in Budapest, Hungary, she won, with Mayan Oliver, the gold medal in the women's relay event.
