= Isabella Isaksen =

American modern pentathlete (born 1993)

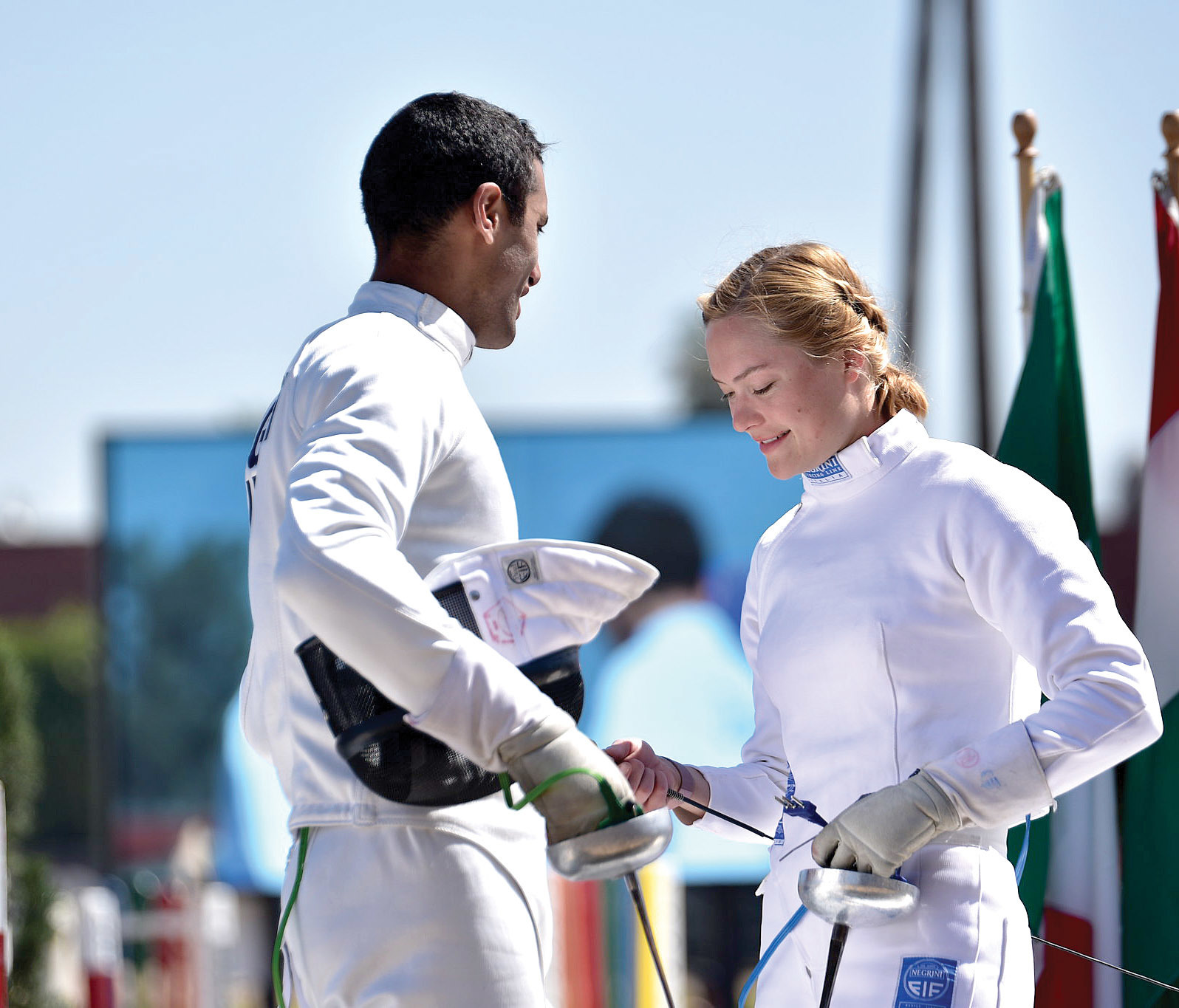
- Isabella Isaksen (right) and Amro El Geziry at 2018 Modern Pentathlon World Cup in Los Angeles

Personal information
- Born: November 22, 1993 (age 32) Fayetteville, Arkansas, U.S.
- Height: 5 ft 9 in (175 cm)
- Spouse: Amro El Geziry (m. 2014)

Sport
- Sport: Modern pentathlon
Medal record
Representing the United States
Pan American Games
Gold medal – first place	2019 Lima	Mixed relay

Isabella Isaksen (born November 22, 1993) is a modern pentathlete from the United States who competed at the 2016 Summer Olympics in Rio de Janeiro, Brazil.

Isaksen is the younger sister of Margaux Isaksen, who competed in the 2008 and 2012 Olympics, and competed in 2016.

== Biography ==
Isaksen was born in Fayetteville, Arkansas. She has one sibling, older sister Margaux Isaksen, who made the United States Olympic Team in modern pentathlon in 2008, 2012, and 2016. Isaksen's father was the captain of a cruise ship. He died of colon cancer when his daughters were 2 years and 6 months old, respectively.

Isaksen was a fencer first, before taking up modern pentathlon, of which fencing is one of the five components. She began fencing shortly before her older sister, Margaux.

In 2012, she completed on the gold medal-winning U.S. women's relay team at the World Junior Modern Pentathlon Championships in Drzonków, Poland, alongside her sister. After her appearance at the 2016 Olympic Games, where she placed 24th with 1255 points, Isaksen and her husband, Amro El Geziry, took the mixed relay silver medal at the 2018 UIPM World Cup II in Los Angeles. The next year, the pair took gold in the mixed relay at the 2019 Pan American Games in Lima, Peru.

In January 2017, Isaksen joined the U.S. Army where she served on a multiple launch rocket system crew and stationed at Fort Carson, Colorado. In January 2021, she was promoted to the rank of staff sergeant.

In 2016, Isaksen began seasonal work with the United States Forest Service, and in 2023, she took a permanent position as a public affairs officer at Ochoco National Forest. In February 2025, just shy of the end of her probationary period in the role, Isaksen was removed from her position as part of the 2025 United States federal mass layoffs. Following this, she was a guest of Oregon senator Jeff Merkley at the Donald Trump's 2025 speech to a joint session of Congress.

== Personal life ==
In May 2014, Isaken married fellow pentathlete Amro El Geziry. The pair joined the army in 2017 and were selected for the U.S. Army World Class Athlete Program.
