= Nathan Schrimsher =

American modern pentathlete (born 1992)

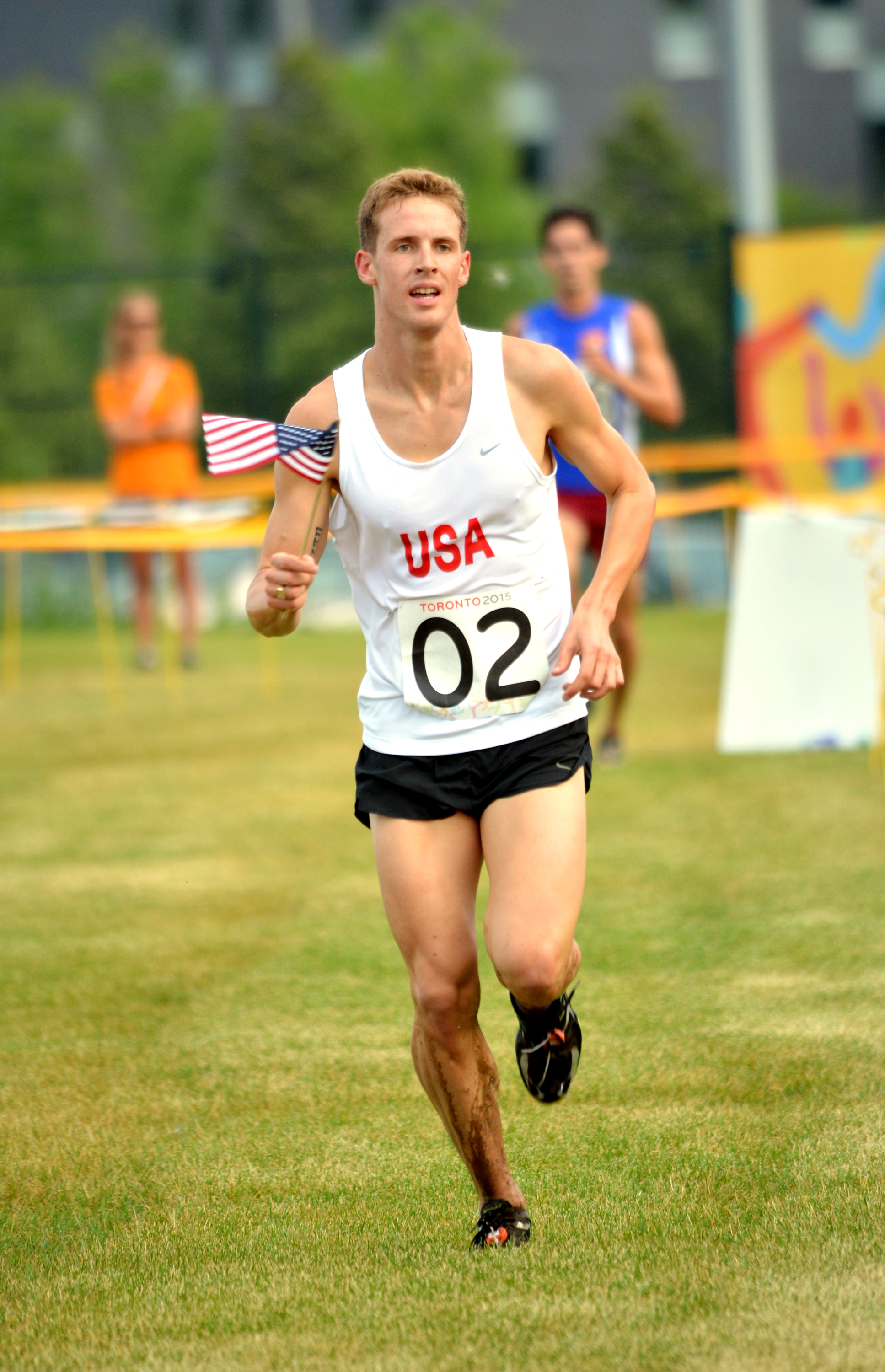
- Schrimsher in 2015

Personal information
- Born: Nathan Schrimsher; May 22, 1992 (age 34) Roswell, New Mexico, U.S.
- Height: 6 ft 2 in (188 cm)
- Weight: 165 lb (75 kg)

Sport
- Sport: Modern pentathlon
- Coached by: Jan Olesinski
Medal record
Representing the United States
Pan American Games
Bronze medal – third place	2015 Toronto	Individual

Nathan Schrimsher (born May 22, 1992) is an American modern pentathlete. He competed in the inaugural Youth Olympic Games (YOG) in August 2010 where he placed 13th in the individual event and 16th in the mixed relay. He was teamed with Cuban Leydi Laura Moya Lopez in the mixed relay. It is believed this was the first time that an American and a Cuban teamed up together in an Olympic style event in decades.

He won the bronze at the 2015 Pan American Games in Toronto, thereby earning a spot on the U.S. Olympic team for the 2016 games in Rio. He was thus the first athlete from Team USA to earn an Olympic berth.

== Personal life ==
Schrimsher was homeschooled in high school and currently lives and trains with his brother, Lucas. He skis in his spare time. Schrimsher is outspoken of his Christian faith.

== Military service ==
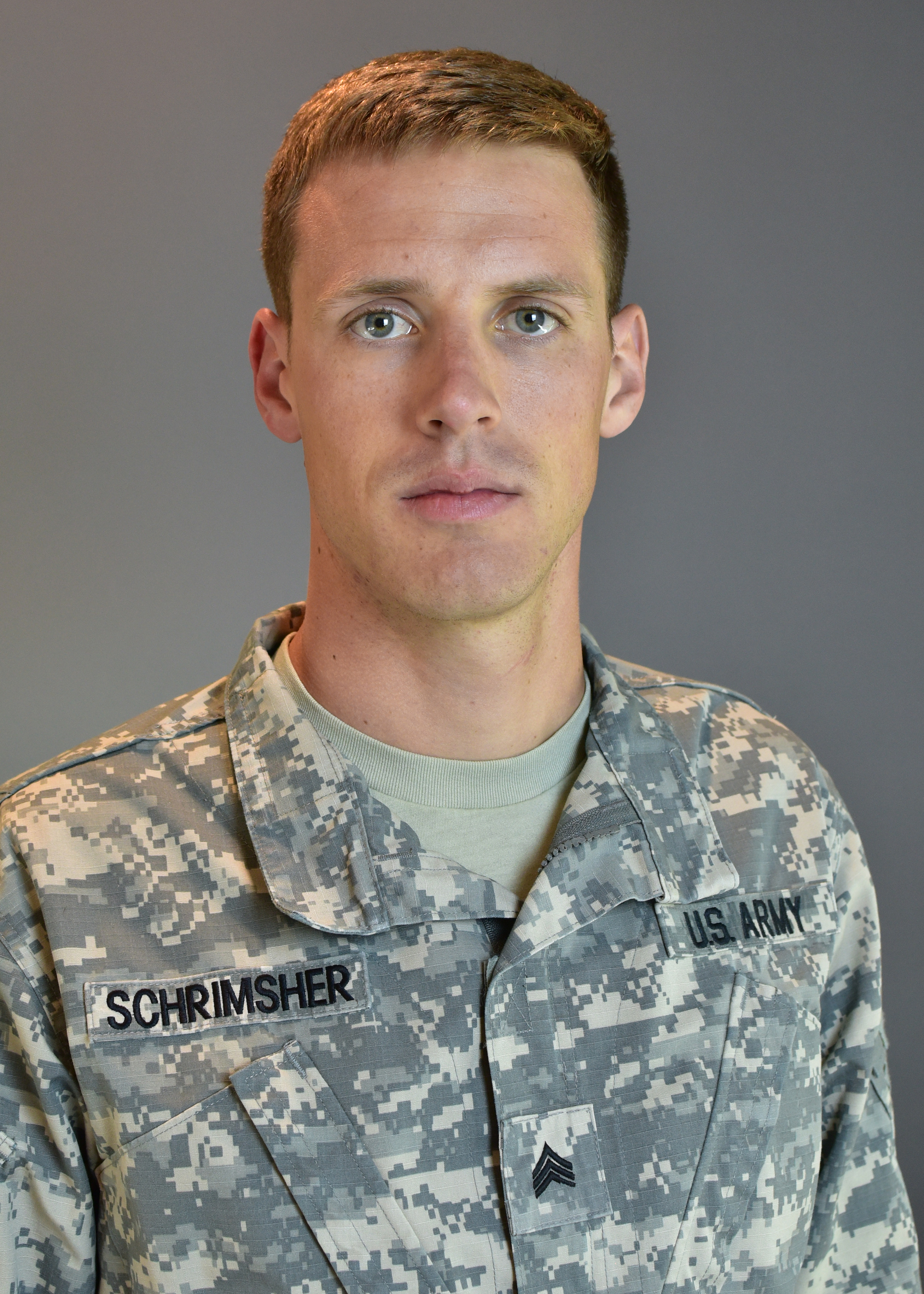
Sgt Sgt Schrimsher in 2017

Schrimsher enlisted in the United States Army in January 2013 as an active duty motor transport operator (88M). He currently holds the rank of sergeant and is a part of the World Class Athlete program, an army initiative which allows soldiers to compete and train in their respective sports with the goal of competing in the Olympics. He is currently stationed at Fort Carson, Colorado.
