= Jess Davis (modern pentathlete) =

American modern pentathlete

Personal information
- Full name: Jessica Davis Savner
- Born: Jessica Davis; January 31, 1992 (age 34) Bethlehem, Connecticut, U.S.
- Education: Central Connecticut State University
- Height: 5 ft 6 in (168 cm)

Sport
- Country: United States
- Sport: Modern pentathlon
Medal record
Women's modern pentathlon
Representing United States
Pan American Games
Bronze medal – third place	2023 Santiago	Mixed relay

Jessica Davis Savner (/ˈsævnər/ SAV-nər; born January 31, 1992) is an American modern pentathlete. She qualified to represent the United States at the 2024 Summer Olympics.

== Biography ==
Davis was born on January 31, 1992, and grew up in Bethlehem, Connecticut. Her father was a triathlete and her mother an equestrian. She attended Nonnewaug High School in Woodbury and competed for the track and field team, specializing in the pole vault. She graduated in 2010 and then attended Central Connecticut State University, where she continued to compete in track and field. She was a member of the Central Connecticut State team for two seasons and set records in the indoor and outdoor pole vault, both of which still stood as of 2024. In 2012, she helped her team finish fifth at the Northeast Conference (NEC) outdoor championships, while placing sixth in the individual NEC indoor championships.

Davis graduated from Central Connecticut State with a bachelor's degree in exercise science. After she graduated, she competed in triathlon events for a time before being introduced by former Olympian Suzanne Paxton to modern pentathlon – a sport consisting of five parts: running, swimming, equestrian, shooting and fencing. She joined the New York Athletic Club and within a year was entered in the Modern Pentathlon World Cup. She competed at the World Modern Pentathlon Championships for the first time in 2016, and by 2023, had participated six times as an individual, three times on the women's team and twice on the mixed team.

Davis won a gold medal at the 2019 Pan American Games in the women's relay, paired with Samantha Achterberg. She won the U.S. modern pentathlon national championship in 2023 and also won that year's Division 1A U.S. épée fencing national championship. She also competed at the 2023 Pan American Games, winning a bronze medal in the mixed relay with Brendan Anderson and placing fourth in the individual event: the latter result qualified her for the 2024 Summer Olympics as the only American representative in modern pentathlon in Paris.
