= Charles Fernández =

Guatemalan modern pentathlete (born 1995)

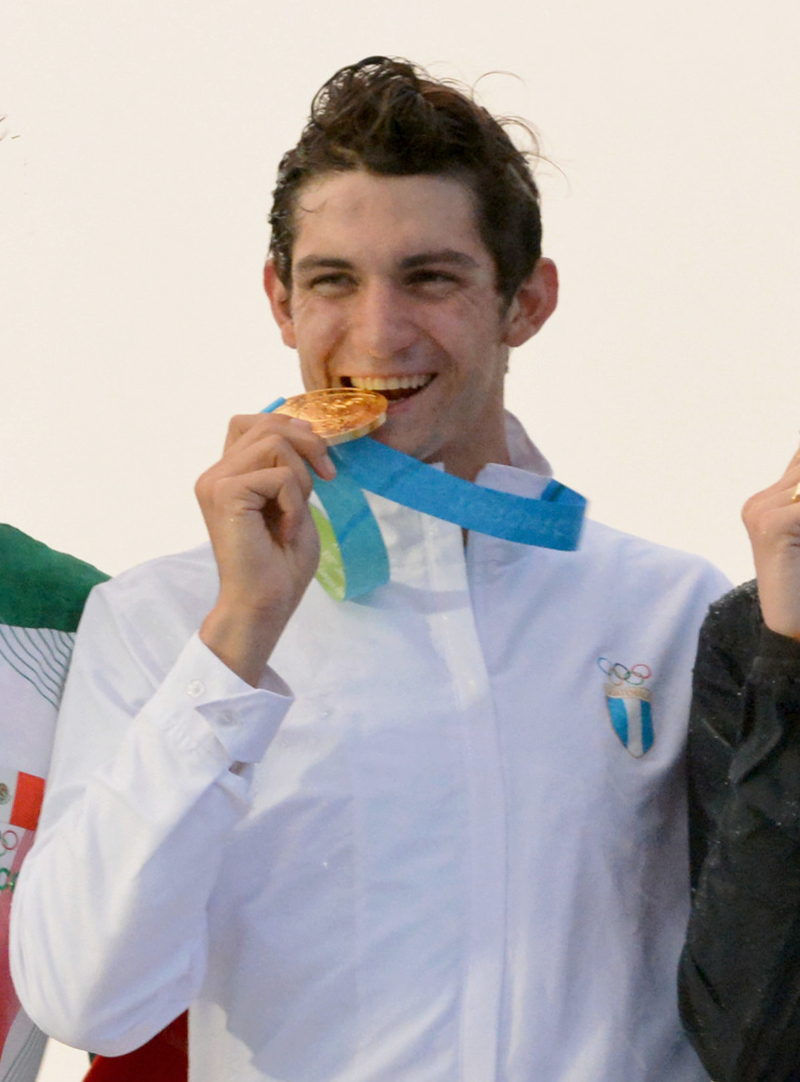
- Fernandez at the 2015 Pan American Games

Personal information
- Born: 28 December 1995 (age 30) Dayton, Ohio, U.S.
- Height: 1.82
- Weight: 74 kg (163 lb)

Sport
- Sport: Modern pentathlon
Medal record
Representing Guatemala
Pan American Games
Gold medal – first place	2015 Toronto	Individual
Gold medal – first place	2019 Lima	Individual
Bronze medal – third place	2019 Lima	Mixed relay
Junior World Championships
Gold medal – first place	2016 Cairo	Individual
Central American and Caribbean Games
Gold medal – first place	2018 Barranquilla	Individual
Gold medal – first place	2018 Barranquilla	Mixed relay

Charles Fernández (born 28 December 1995) is a Guatemalan modern pentathlete. He competed at the 2016 Summer Olympics in the men's event and finished fifteenth. Fernandez won the men's modern pentathlon at the 2015 Pan American Games. He also won a gold medal at the World Junior Championships. Fernandez has competed in three World Modern Pentathlon Championships as well as multiple youth and junior world championships and a Central American and Caribbean Games.

== Early life and education ==
Charles Fernandez's father, Carlos, is also a modern pentathlete, competing at the 2014 Modern Pentathlon Masters World Championships in the men's over-50 competition.

Charles Fernandez grew up in Guatemala, in a multicultural family with an Ecuadorian mother and Guatemalan father. He did his middle school and part of high school in the Christian Academy of Guatemala, later changing to homeschooling to focus more on his sport activities. Charles later attended Liberty University in Lynchburg, Virginia.

== Competition ==
Fernandez's first international competition was in 2012 when he competed at the Union Internationale de Pentathlon Moderne Youth World Championships in Hungary. He finished 27th in the competition. In May 2014 Fernandez competed at the 2014 Union Internationale de Pentathlon Moderne International Junior Championships in Drzonkow, Poland, finishing 43rd in the individual event. Fernandez's first World Modern Pentathlon Championships was the 2014 event in Warsaw, Poland. Competing in the individual senior men's event, Fernandez finished 25th. Fernandez's next major competition was the 2014 Central American and Caribbean Games. Fernandez finished sixth in the individual men's event.

He competed at the World Cup final in 2015. At the championships held in Belarus, Fernandez finished 11th. In June 2015 Fernandez competed in the 2015 World Modern Pentathlon Championships and finished 12th in the men's relay event. On 18 July 2015 Fernandez won a gold medal at the 2015 Pan American Games in the men's individual event. Fernandez finished with a points score of 1444 points. His best discipline was the fencing where he scored the most points out of all the competitors. Fernandez won the gold medal by five points over Mexican Ismael Hernández. At 19 years of age Fernandez became the youngest modern pentathlon gold medalist in the history of the Pan American Games. By winning gold, Fernandez qualified for the 2016 Summer Olympics. Later in 2015 was the 2015 Union Internationale de Pentathlon Moderne World Junior Championships, where Fernandez finished fourth.

In May 2016 the 2016 World Cup final was held in Sarasota, United States. Fernandez finished 18th in the individual event. At the 2016 World Modern Pentathlon Championships Fernandez competed in the men's individual competition. He finished 13th with 1468 points. On 18 August 2016 Fernandez competed in the men's event at the 2016 Summer Olympics and finished 15th. Fernandez won a gold medal at the 2016 Union Internationale de Pentathlon Moderne World Junior Championships in September 2016. At the event held in Cairo, Egypt, Fernandez scored 1429 points and beat South Korean Jun Woong-tae by eleven points.

Two years later, in 2018, Charles Fernandez represented his country in the Central American Caribbean Games held in Barranquilla, Colombia where he finished with a sensational performance achieving 2 gold medals in the individual event and the mix relay event. Fernandez was later appointed by IOC president, Thomas Bach, as an Athlete Role Model in the Youth Olympic Games held in Buenos Aires, Argentina, October 2018.
