= Lester Ders =

Cuban modern pentathlete

Personal information
- Nationality: Cuban
- Born: 7 May 1989 (age 36)

Sport
- Sport: Modern pentathlon

Lester Ders (born 7 May 1989) is a Cuban modern pentathlete.

Ders represented Cuba at the 2020 Tokyo Summer Olympics, competing in the men's modern pentathlon.
