= Yasser Hefny =

Egyptian modern pentathlete

Yasser Hefny OLY
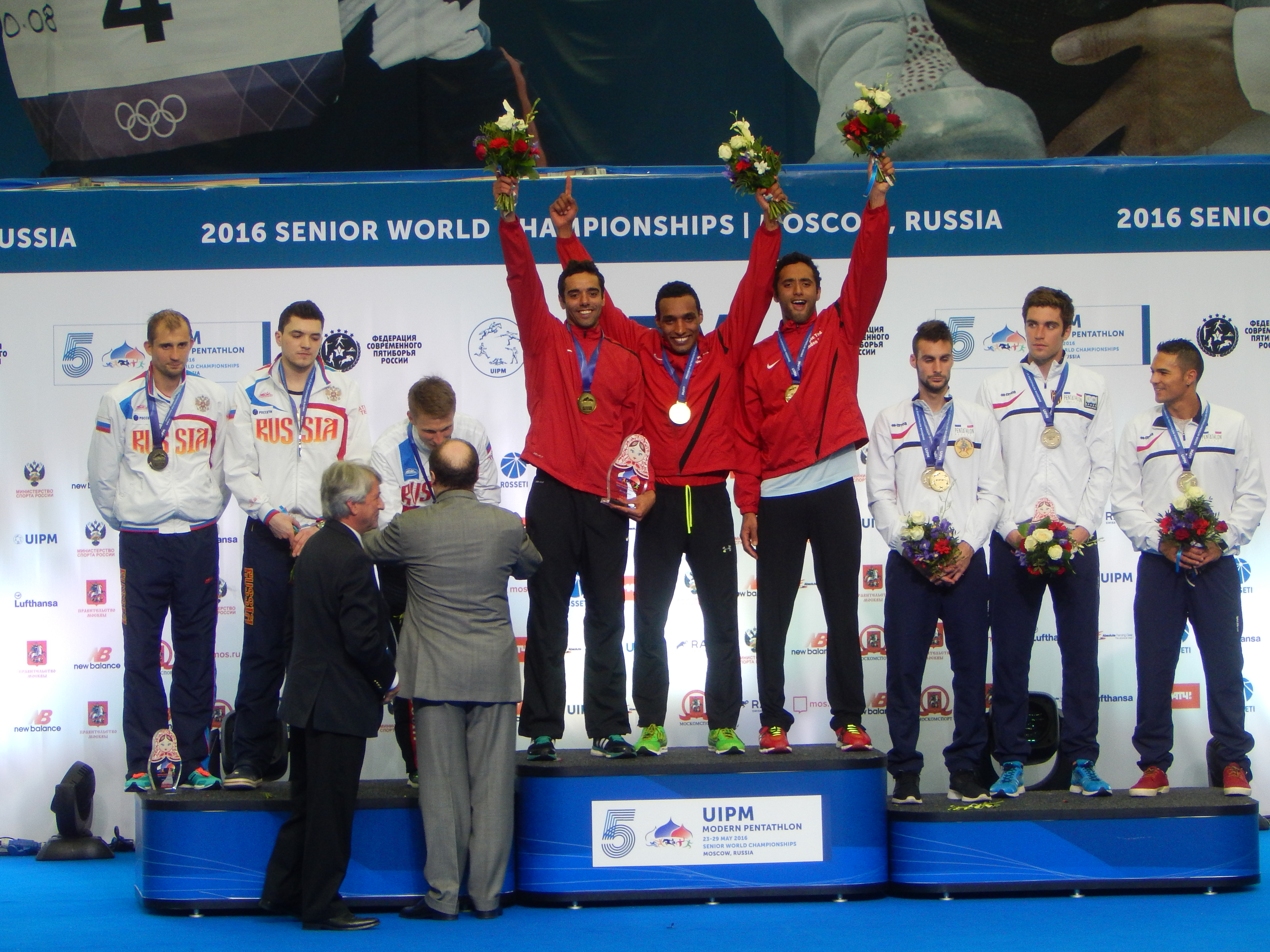

Personal information
- Full name: Yasser Mohammed Hefny
- Born: 8 February 1989 (age 37) Cairo, Egypt
- Years active: 10
- Height: 1.81 m (5 ft 11 1/2 in)
- Weight: 70 kg (150 lb)
Medal record
Representing Egypt
Men's Modern Pentathlon
World Championships
Gold medal – first place	2005 Plzeň	Individual
Gold medal – first place	2007 SouthAF	Individual
Representing Egypt
Men's Speed-ball
World Championships
Gold medal – first place	2008 Paris	Individual
Gold medal – first place	2009 Cairo	Individual

Yasser Mohammed Hefny (born 8 February 1989) is an Egyptian modern pentathlete. Hefny has won many international competitions including the youth world championship of pentathlon in 2005 and 2007, and later the world champion of speedball in Paris.

== Early life ==
His love of sports began when he started swimming in the school of el Zohoor club, and at the age of 6 he joined the speedball school in the same club. After two years, Yasser decided to go competitive and joined the boys swimming and speedball teams.

At the age of 11, Hefny have decided to find a new competition to challenge himself so he joined the modern pentathlon team in 6 October club. At the age of 12, he was chosen to join the Egyptian national team of modern pentathlon and began his international achievements by winning his first international title in the biathlon world championship in 2004 in Germany.

== Recent accomplishments ==
Hefny won many international championships, including the world championships in 2005 and 2007 at the age of 16 and 18. He also became the 2008 world champion of speedball in Paris, France, setting a new record of 570.

In 2012, he competed at the 2012 Summer Olympics.
