= Amro El Geziry =

Egyptian American modern pentathlete (born 1986)

Amro El Geziry OLY
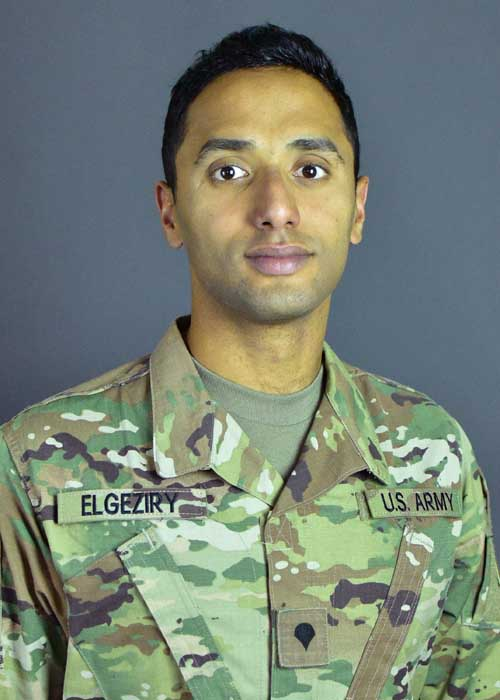
- El Geziry in 2017

Personal information
- Native name: عمرو عبد الرحمن علي الجزيري
- Full name: Amro Abdulrahman Ali El-Geziry
- Nationality: Egyptian / American
- Born: 19 November 1986 (age 39) Cairo, Egypt
- Height: 185 cm (6 ft 1 in)
- Weight: 75 kg (165 lb)
- Spouse: Isabella Isaksen (m. 2014)

Sport
- Country: Egypt; United States
- Sport: Modern pentathlon
- Club: El Shams Sporting Club; U.S. Army WCAP
Medal record
Representing Egypt
World Championship
Gold medal – first place	2016 Moscow	Team
Silver medal – second place	2014 Warsaw	Individual
Representing the United States
Pan American Games
Gold medal – first place	2019 Lima	Mixed relay
Silver medal – second place	2019 Lima	Relay

Amro El Geziry (Egyptian Arabic: عمرو الجزيرى; born 19 November 1986) is an Egyptian American modern pentathlete. He competed for Egypt at the 2008, 2012 and 2016 Olympics and placed 32nd, 33rd and 25th, respectively. His brothers, Emad and Omar, are also Olympic pentathletes.

In June 2021, he qualified to represent the United States at the 2020 Summer Olympics.

== Personal life ==
In May 2014, El Geziry married fellow pentathlete Isabella Isaksen. The pair joined the army in 2017 and were selected for the U.S. Army World Class Athlete Program.
