= Mayan Oliver =

Mexican modern pentathlete (born 1993)

Personal information
- Full name: Carmen Mayan Oliver Lara
- Born: 11 July 1993 (age 33) Cuautitlán, Mexico

Sport
- Sport: Modern pentathlon
Medal record
Women's modern pentathlon
Representing Mexico
World Championships
Gold medal – first place	2019 Budapest	Relay
Silver medal – second place	2022 Alexandria	Relay
Bronze medal – third place	2023 Bath	Relay
Bronze medal – third place	2024 Zhengzhou	Team
Pan American Games
Gold medal – first place	2023 Santiago	Individual
Gold medal – first place	2023 Santiago	Relay
Bronze medal – third place	2015 Toronto	Individual
Central American and Caribbean Games
Gold medal – first place	2018 Cali	Individual
Gold medal – first place	2018 Cali	Relay
Gold medal – first place	2023 Santo Domingo	Individual
Gold medal – first place	2023 Santo Domingo	Relay

Carmen Mayan Oliver Lara (Note: In this Spanish name, the first or paternal surname is Oliver and the second or maternal family name is Lara.) (born 11 July 1993) is a Mexican modern pentathlete. She competed in the women's event at the 2020 Summer Olympics.
