= Ismael Hernández (pentathlete) =

Mexican modern pentathlete

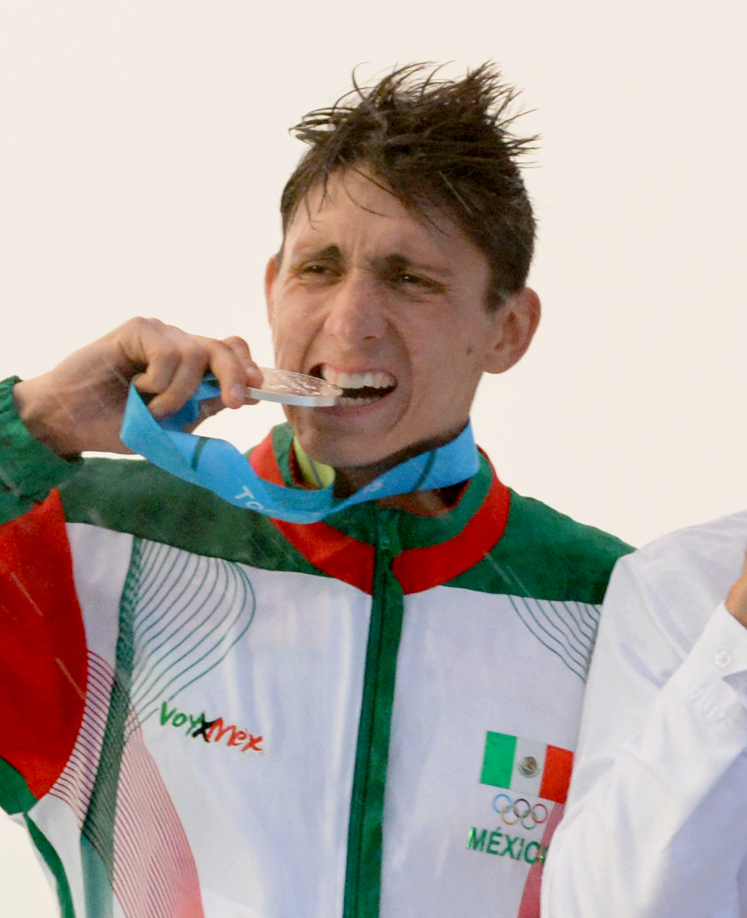
- Hernández at the 2015 Pan American Games

Personal information
- Full name: Ismael Marcelo Hernández Uscanga
- Born: 23 January 1990 (age 36) Cuautla, Morelos, Mexico
- Height: 178 cm (5 ft 10 in)
- Weight: 64 kg (141 lb)

Sport
- Country: Mexico
- Sport: Modern pentathlon
- Coached by: Octavio Angelito
Medal record
Representing Mexico
Olympic Games
Bronze medal – third place	2016 Rio de Janeiro	Individual
Pan American Games
Silver medal – second place	2015 Toronto	Individual
Central American and Caribbean Games
Gold medal – first place	2014 Veracruz	Individual
Central American and Caribbean Games
Gold medal – first place	2014 Veracruz	Relay

Ismael Marcelo Hernández Uscanga (born 23 January 1990) is a Mexican modern pentathlete. He won a bronze medal at the 2016 Summer Olympics, after having finished 23rd in the previous World Championships. He was awarded with the "Premio Nacional del Deporte" given by the Mexican Secretariat of Public Education in 2016.

== Personal life ==
Hernández was born in family of military officers and served in the Mexican Army. He has a younger brother who is following his steps by also doing the modern pentathlon. He graduated from the Tecnológico de Monterrey in 2015 with a degree in economics and completed his MBA at Duke University's Fuqua School of Business in Durham, North Carolina.

== Career ==
Hernández has a sixteen-year-long athletic career. When Hernández was nine years old, he visited the Mexican army's sports facilities where a group of kids were running and swimming. This moment helped Hernández realize that he wanted to become an Olympic athlete.

He started competing internationally in 2009. Ismael Hernández competed in the 2010 Central American and Caribbean Games, where he won an individual silver medal and a bronze medal as part of a team of other Mexican athletes in the modern pentathlon event.

One year later, WADA (World Anti-Doping Agency) analyzed some doping tests and declared Hernández positive for the use of clenbuterol, banning him from competition.

Just before the 2012 London Olympic Games started, he fractured his arm while he was riding his horse. This injury set aside the Mexican's opportunity to compete in the Olympic Games of that year.

On the 2012-2016 Olympic cycle, Hernandez had great performances. In 2014 along with his teammate Tamara Vega they won the 2nd World Cup Mixed Relays event in front of Ireland and Hungary. Later that year, Hernandez had his revenge at the Central American and Caribbean Championships where he won 2 gold medals. Hernández qualified for the Olympics in Rio de Janeiro by participating in the 2015 Toronto Pan American Games, where he won a silver medal. He trained in two different locations, Europe and the United States of America. During this training process, he suffered an injury, which threatened with his participation in the summer event. Before the Olympics began, Ismael Hernández was ranked in the 16th position in the world. By the end of the Olympic Games, Ismael Hernández earned the fifth medal for the Mexican Olympic Team in Rio 2016 and the first medal for Mexico in the modern pentathlon. The first event was not the best one for Hernández after finishing in 19th place. But after the swimming event was finished, Ismael climbed to 11th place. Thanks to the show jumping event he moved to 6th place. In the final event, which consisted on a three kilometer run and several shooting stations, Hernández obtained 626 points. After the five events finished, Hernández had 1468 points, just 4 points behind the Ukrainian Pavlo Tymoshchenko. This earned him the bronze medal. He was the only Mexican to win medals in the three main events that are part of the Olympic Cycle.

In September 2016, Ismael Hernández was awarded with the "Premio Nacional del Deporte", which is given by the Mexican Secretariat of Public Education (in Spanish Secretaría de Educación Pública, SEP). This award is given to Mexican athletes for high achievement.

He earned his MBA from Duke, The Fuqua School of Business and currently lives in New York, where he is actively involved with the Latin community.

== See also ==
- List of people from Morelos
