= Sofía Cabrera =

Guatemalan modern pentathlete (born 1997)

Personal information
- Nationality: Guatemalan
- Born: 27 June 1997 (age 29)
- Height: 1.75 m (5 ft 9 in)
- Weight: 60 kg (132 lb)

Sport
- Country: Guatemala
- Sport: Modern pentathlon
Medal record
Women's modern pentathlon
Representing Guatemala
World Championships
Bronze medal – third place	2018 Mexico City	Relay
Bronze medal – third place	2024 Zhengzhou	Relay
Central American and Caribbean Games
Gold medal – first place	2018 Cali	Mixed relay
Silver medal – second place	2018 Cali	Individual
Representing Centro Caribe Sports
Central American and Caribbean Games
Silver medal – second place	2023 Santo Domingo	Relay

Sofía Cabrera (born 27 June 1997) is a Guatemalan modern pentathlete.

She participated at the 2018 World Modern Pentathlon Championships, winning a medal.
