= Tamara Vega =

Mexican modern pentathlete (born 1993)

Personal information
- Full name: Tamara Vega Arroyo
- National team: Mexico
- Born: 9 March 1993 (age 33) Ciudad Juárez

Sport
- Event: Modern pentathlon
Medal record
Representing Mexico
Women's modern pentathlon
World Championships
Bronze medal – third place	2024 Zhengzhou	Team
Pan American Games
Gold medal – first place	2023 Santiago	Mixed relay
Silver medal – second place	2015 Toronto	Individual
Bronze medal – third place	2011 Guadalajara	Individual
Women's laser-run
World Championships
Silver medal – second place	2023 Bath	Mixed relay
- Updated on 15 August 2016

Tamara Vega Arroyo (Note: In this Spanish name, the first or paternal surname is Vega and the second or maternal family name is Arroyo.) (born 9 March 1993) is a Mexican modern pentathlete. She was born in Ciudad Juárez, Chihuahua. At the 2012 Summer Olympics, she competed in the women's competition, finishing in 36th (last) place but improved to 11th in 2016.

== See also ==
- Modern pentathlon at the 2012 Summer Olympics – Women's
- Modern pentathlon at the 2016 Summer Olympics – Women's
