= 2016 World Modern Pentathlon Championships – Women's individual and team =

Women's individual at the 2016 UIPM Senior World Championships
- Dates: May 25-27
- Competitors: 75 from 29 nations
- Winning points: 1386

Medalists
gold medal	Sarolta Kovács	Hungary
silver medal	Élodie Clouvel	France
bronze medal	Lena Schöneborn	Germany

The women's individual at the 2016 UIPM Senior World Championships was held on 25 & 27 May 2016.

== Qualification ==
On 25 May 2016, 36 competitors qualified for the final as described below:

The top 8 total scores in each group qualify by right; the top 12 total scores across the remainder of the field also qualify. Competitors do not perform the riding discipline during qualification.

KEY:	Q	Qualified by right	q	Qualified via remainder ranking

=== Group A ===
Rank	Athlete	Fencing Victories (pts)	Swimming Time (pts)	Combined Time (pts)	Total
1	Élodie Clouvel (FRA)	10 (194)	2:08.32 (316)	12:32.04 (548)	1058 Q
2	Lena Schöneborn (GER)	16 (242)	2:19.90 (281)	12:45.08 (535)	1058 Q
3	Gulnaz Gubaydullina (RUS)	11 (202)	2:08.00 (316)	12:41.01 (539)	1057 Q
4	Annika Schleu (GER)	10 (194)	2:18.56 (285)	12:04.05 (576)	1055 Q
5	Samantha Murray (GBR)	16 (242)	2:09.95 (311)	13:18.08 (502)	1055 Q
6	Natsumi Tomonaga (JPN)	12 (210)	2:15.28 (295)	12:31.07 (549)	1054 Q
7	Alice Sotero (ITA)	11 (202)	2:10.43 (309)	12:40.01 (540)	1051 Q
8	Donna Vakalis (CAN)	13 (218)	2:21.95 (275)	12:22.05 (558)	1051 Q
9	Melanie McCann (CAN)	14 (226)	2:19.05 (283)	12:39.01 (541)	1050 q
10	Tatsiana Yelizarova (BLR)	17 (250)	2:30.51 (249)	12:29.06 (551)	1050 q
11	Tamara Alekszejev (HUN)	13 (218)	2:18.55 (285)	12:35.08 (545)	1048 q
12	Elena Potapenko (KAZ)	10 (194)	2:15.38 (294)	12:21.05 (559)	1047 q
13	Marta Garcia-Miguel (ESP)	11 (202)	2:16.06 (292)	12:27.07 (553)	1047 q
14	Katsiaryna Arol (BLR)	15 (234)	2:22.89 (272)	12:42.03 (538)	1044
15	Natalya Coyle (IRL)	12 (210)	2:17.93 (287)	12:36.01 (544)	1041
16	Margaux Isaksen (USA)	13 (218)	2:18.87 (284)	12:50.04 (530)	1032
17	Freyja Prentice (GBR)	9 (186)	2:23.70 (269)	12:12.04 (568)	1023
18	Tamara Vega (MEX)	11 (202)	2:18.43 (285)	12:47.01 (533)	1020
19	Valeriya Permykina (UKR)	10 (194)	2:17.48 (288)	12:44.06 (536)	1018
20	Laura Salminen (FIN)	10 (194)	2:19.57 (282)	12:43.04 (537)	1013
21	Sive Brassil (IRL)	8 (178)	2:15.48 (294)	12:48.09 (532)	1004
22	Mayan Oliver (MEX)	9 (186)	2:30.92 (248)	12:32.07 (548)	982
23	Morsy Haydy (EGY)	10 (194)	2:28.46 (255)	12:49.05 (531)	980
24	Jessica Davis (USA)	13 (218)	2:32.07 (244)	13:19.06 (501)	963
25	Larissa Lellys (BRA)	10 (194)	2:18.90 (284)	13:44.02 (476)	954

=== Group B ===
Rank	Athlete	Fencing Victories (pts)	Swimming Time (pts)	Combined Time (pts)	Total
1	Gintarė Venčkauskaitė (LTU)	13 (218)	2:20.19 (280)	12:18.00 (562)	1060 Q
2	Kate French (GBR)	15 (234)	2:15.37 (294)	12:48.05 (532)	1060 Q
3	Janine Kohlmann (GER)	17 (250)	2:16.73 (290)	13:01.00 (519)	1059 Q
4	Sarolta Kovács (HUN)	14 (226)	2:11.54 (306)	12:53.05 (527)	1059 Q
5	Chen Qian (CHN)	17 (250)	2:18.88 (284)	12:58.00 (522)	1056 Q
6	Liang Wanxia (CHN)	13 (218)	2:17.91 (287)	12:33.00 (547)	1052 Q
7	Jeļena Rubļevska (LAT)	21 (282)	2:30.57 (249)	13:00.00 (520)	1051 Q
8	Zsófia Földházi (HUN)	7 (170)	2:11.05 (307)	12:07.00 (573)	1050 Q
9	Julie Belhamri (FRA)	10 (194)	2:16.27 (292)	12:18.00 (562)	1048 q
10	Claudia Cesarini (ITA)	15 (234)	2:22.19 (274)	12:43.00 (537)	1045 q
11	Atsuko Itani (JPN)	14 (226)	2:17.66 (287)	12:50.00 (530)	1043
12	Mariana Arceo (MEX)	15 (234)	2:18.67 (284)	13:07.00 (513)	1031
13	Ieva Serapinaitė (LTU)	13 (218)	2:13.82 (299)	13:09.00 (511)	1028
14	Isabel Brand (GUA)	11 (202)	2:20.45 (279)	12:40.00 (540)	1021
15	Olga Karmanchikova (RUS)	12 (210)	2:13.13 (301)	13:19.00 (501)	1012
16	Ayelen Zapata (ARG)	13 (218)	2:35.94 (233)	12:20.00 (560)	1011
17	Shino Yamanaka (JPN)	9 (186)	2:30.28 (250)	12:05.05 (575)	1011
18	Aleksandra Chmielewska (POL)	8 (178)	2:27.60 (258)	12:06.00 (574)	1010
19	Barbora Kodedová (CZE)	10 (194)	2:24.74 (266)	12:31.00 (549)	1009
20	Isabella Isaksen (USA)	12 (210)	2:23.58 (270)	12:55.00 (525)	1005
21	Samantha Achterberg (USA)	5 (154)	2:19.00 (283)	12:12.09 (568)	1005
22	Jeong Mina (KOR)	7 (170)	2:17.99 (287)	13:02.00 (518)	975
23	Priscila Oliveira (BRA)	9 (186)	2:15.69 (293)	13:32.00 (488)	967
24	Pamela Zapata (ARG)	10 (194)	2:24.13 (268)	13:38.00 (482)	944
25	Javiera Rosas (CHI)	7 (170)	2:20.37 (279)	14:06.00 (454)	903

=== Group C ===
Rank	Athlete	Fencing Victories (pts)	Swimming Time (pts)	Combined Time (pts)	Total
1	Yang Soo-jin (KOR)	17 (258)	2:17.19 (289)	13:02.00 (518)	1065 Q
2	Laura Asadauskaitė (LTU)	18 (266)	2:21.40 (276)	12:58.00 (522)	1064 Q
3	İlke Özyüksel (TUR)	10 (202)	2:16.37 (291)	12:11.00 (569)	1062 Q
4	Anastasiya Prokopenko (BLR)	14 (234)	2:27.37 (258)	12:12.00 (568)	1060 Q
5	Zhang Xiaonan (CHN)	16 (250)	2:19.68 (281)	12:53.00 (527)	1058 Q
6	Marie Oteiza (FRA)	14 (234)	2:12.87 (302)	12:58.50 (522)	1058 Q
7	Yane Marques (BRA)	16 (250)	2:14.33 (297)	13:10.00 (510)	1057 Q
8	Kim Sun-woo (KOR)	14 (234)	2:18.15 (286)	12:44.00 (536)	1056 Q
9	Anna Buriak (RUS)	12 (218)	2:19.98 (281)	12:24.00 (556)	1055 q
10	Rena Shimazu (JPN)	11 (210)	2:14.76 (296)	12:33.00 (547)	1053 q
11	Iryna Prasiantsova (BLR)	12 (218)	2:29.12 (253)	11:59.00 (581)	1052 q
12	Anna Maliszewska (POL)	13 (226)	2:21.82 (275)	12:31.00 (549)	1050 q
13	Donata Rimšaitė (RUS)	12 (218)	2:23.30 (271)	12:22.00 (558)	1047 q
14	Joanna Muir (GBR)	10 (202)	2:14.82 (296)	12:41.00 (539)	1037
15	Zhong Xiuting (CHN)	9 (194)	2:20.19 (280)	12:19.00 (561)	1035
16	Karolina Gužauskaitė (LTU)	8 (186)	2:17.79 (287)	12:19.00 (561)	1034
17	Elena Micheli (ITA)	10 (202)	2:15.08 (295)	13:10.00 (510)	1007
18	Sophia Hernandez (GUA)	10 (202)	2:26.35 (261)	12:43.00 (537)	1000
19	İpek Akşin (TUR)	9 (194)	2:17.99 (287)	13:11.00 (509)	990
20	Camilla Lontano (ITA)	7 (178)	2:13.78 (299)	13:15.00 (505)	982
21	Laura Leidis Moya (CUB)	10 (202)	2:15.65 (294)	13:50.00 (470)	966
22	Victoria Tereshchuk (UKR)	10 (202)	2:23.41 (270)	13:39.00 (481)	953
23	Alexandra Bettinelli (GER)	2 (138)	2:22.79 (272)	12:42.00 (538)	948
24	Natalia Hachulska (POL)	10 (202)	2:18.59 (285)	13:59.00 (461)	948
25	Anastasiya Spas (UKR)	DNF (0)	2:12.23 (304)	DNS (0)	304

== Final ==
The final was held on 27 May 2016.

Rank	Athlete	Fencing Victories (pts)	Swimming Time (pts)	Riding Time (pts)	Combined Time (pts)	Total
1st place, gold medalist(s)	Sarolta Kovács (HUN)	21 (228)	2:10.00 (310)	76.00 (300)	12:32.23 (548)	1386
2nd place, silver medalist(s)	Élodie Clouvel (FRA)	16 (196)	2:06.59 (321)	79.00 (297)	12:20.45 (560)	1374
3rd place, bronze medalist(s)	Lena Schöneborn (GER)	25 (250)	2:19.85 (281)	87.00 (265)	12:03.73 (577)	1373
4	Laura Asadauskaitė (LTU)	19 (216)	2:21.11 (277)	91.00 (275)	11:40.47 (600)	1368
5	Chen Qian (CHN)	19 (214)	2:15.75 (293)	77.00 (299)	12:22.28 (558)	1364
6	Liang Wanxia (CHN)	20 (220)	2:18.33 (285)	68.00 (300)	12:25.53 (555)	1360
7	Donata Rimšaitė (RUS)	26 (258)	2:27.10 (259)	82.00 (294)	12:32.44 (548)	1359
8	Zsófia Földházi (HUN)	17 (202)	2:12.00 (304)	78.00 (284)	12:13.24 (567)	1357
9	Yang Soo-jin (KOR)	23 (240)	2:17.31 (289)	75.00 (300)	12:52.81 (528)	1357
10	Zhang Xiaonan (CHN)	22 (232)	2:20.95 (278)	69.00 (286)	12:25.56 (555)	1351
11	Alice Sotero (ITA)	19 (214)	2:12.10 (304)	73.00 (293)	12:41.12 (539)	1350
12	Kim Sun-woo (KOR)	21 (226)	2:18.92 (284)	77.00 (299)	12:43.58 (537)	1346
13	Yane Marques (BRA)	22 (232)	2:14.86 (296)	79.00 (290)	12:56.63 (524)	1342
14	Anna Maliszewska (POL)	17 (204)	2:19.66 (281)	72.00 (300)	12:24.69 (556)	1341
15	Janine Kohlmann (GER)	18 (208)	2:17.09 (289)	73.00 (300)	12:37.66 (543)	1340
16	Samantha Murray (GBR)	19 (214)	2:08.40 (315)	80.00 (289)	13:01.15 (519)	1337
17	Tamara Alekszejev (HUN)	18 (213)	2:20.37 (279)	73.00 (300)	12:35.71 (545)	1337
18	Anastasiya Prokopenko (BLR)	21 (227)	2:25.99 (263)	99.00 (253)	11:48.41 (592)	1335
19	Gintarė Venčkauskaitė (LTU)	13 (178)	2:21.80 (275)	79.00 (287)	11:48.24 (592)	1332
20	Annika Schleu (GER)	12 (174)	2:18.24 (286)	75.00 (286)	11:57.21 (583)	1329
21	Gulnaz Gubaydullina (RUS)	9 (154)	2:07.24 (319)	76.00 (286)	12:12.33 (568)	1327
22	Rena Shimazu (JPN)	15 (182)	2:13.52 (300)	85.00 (284)	12:21.70 (559)	1325
23	Marie Oteiza (FRA)	16 (196)	2:13.49 (300)	78.00 (298)	12:51.88 (529)	1323
24	Kate French (GBR)	17 (202)	2:19.22 (283)	76.00 (293)	12:36.03 (544)	1322
25	Natsumi Tomonaga (JPN)	14 (184)	2:15.09 (295)	84.00 (292)	12:33.57 (547)	1318
26	Iryna Prasiantsova (BLR)	17 (202)	2:26.61 (261)	81.00 (278)	12:10.73 (570)	1311
27	Donna Vakalis (CAN)	14 (187)	2:22.00 (274)	83.00 (283)	12:16.03 (564)	1308
28	Jeļena Rubļevska (LAT)	22 (235)	2:28.91 (254)	79.00 (290)	13:04.69 (516)	1295
29	Tatsiana Yelizarova (BLR)	17 (203)	2:29.00 (253)	89.00 (287)	12:33.06 (547)	1290
30	Elena Potapenko (KAZ)	11 (166)	2:15.38 (294)	62.00 (300)	13:12.93 (508)	1268
31	Melanie McCann (CAN)	16 (202)	2:20.50 (279)	97.00 (259)	13:04.53 (516)	1256
32	Anna Buriak (RUS)	14 (184)	2:20.56 (279)	95.00 (243)	12:47.18 (533)	1239
33	Marta Garcia-Miguel (ESP)	13 (179)	2:16.77 (290)	131.00 (205)	12:50.33 (530)	1204
34	Claudia Cesarini (ITA)	17 (202)	2:21.42 (276)	103.00 (211)	13:20.58 (500)	1189
35	İlke Özyüksel (TUR)	9 (156)	2:17.66 (287)	EL (0)	12:39.27 (541)	984
36	Julie Belhamri (FRA)	14 (184)	2:16.91 (290)	DNS (0)	DNS (0)	474

== Team standings ==
Standings are determined by the sum of three scores for each country, whether or not their respective competitors qualified for the final.

Rank	Country	Athletes	Qualified for final Yes/No	Team score
1st place, gold medalist(s)	Hungary	Zsófia Földházi; Tamara Alekszejev; Sarolta Kovács	Y Y Y	4080
2nd place, silver medalist(s)	China	Zhang Xiaonan; Liang Wanxia; Chen Qian	Y Y Y	4075
3rd place, bronze medalist(s)	Germany	Annika Schleu; Lena Schöneborn; Janine Kohlmann	Y Y Y	4042
4	Russia	Anna Buriak; Gulnaz Gubaydullina; Donata Rimšaitė	Y Y Y	3925
5	France	Marie Oteiza; Élodie Clouvel; Julie Belhamri	Y Y Y	3745
6	Lithuania	Gintarė Venčkauskaitė; Laura Asadauskaitė; Ieva Serapinaitė	Y Y N	3728
7	Belarus	Iryna Prasiantsova; Anastasiya Prokopenko; Katsiaryna Arol	Y Y N	3690
8	Great Britain	Samantha Murray; Kate French; Freyja Prentice	Y Y N	3682
9	South Korea	Kim Sun-woo; Yang Soo-jin; Jeong Mina	Y Y N	3678
10	Japan	Rena Shimazu; Natsumi Tomonaga; Shino Yamanaka	Y Y N	3654
11	Italy	Alice Sotero; Claudia Cesarini; Elena Micheli	Y Y N	3546
12	Poland	Anna Maliszewska; Aleksandra Chmielewska; Natalia Hachulska	Y N N	3299
13	Brazil	Yane Marques; Priscila Oliveira; Larissa Lellys	Y N N	3263
14	United States	Samantha Achterberg; Isabella Isaksen; Margaux Isaksen	N N N	3042
15	Mexico	Mayan Oliver; Mariana Arceo; Tamara Vega	N N N	3033
16	Ukraine	Valeriya Permykina; Anastasiya Spas; Victoria Tereshchuk	N N N	2275
