= 2016 World Modern Pentathlon Championships – Mixed relay =

Mixed relay at the 2016 UIPM Senior World Championships
- Dates: May 29
- Competitors: 46 from 23 nations
- Winning points: 1509

Medalists
| gold medal | Aleksander Lesun; Donata Rimšaitė | Russia |
| silver medal | Han Jiahao; Zhang Xiaonan | China |
| bronze medal | Ilya Palazkov; Anastasiya Prokopenko | Belarus |

The mixed relay at the 2016 UIPM Senior World Championships was held on 29 May 2016.

== Results ==
Breakdown is as follows:

| Rank | Country | Athletes | Fencing Victories (pts) | Swimming Time (pts) | Riding Time (pts) | Combined Time (pts) | Total |
|---|---|---|---|---|---|---|---|
| 1st place, gold medalist(s) | Russia | Aleksander Lesun; Donata Rimšaitė | 29 (242) | 2:01.60 (336) | 83.00 (300) | 11:09.39 (631) | 1509 |
| 2nd place, silver medalist(s) | China | Han Jiahao; Zhang Xiaonan | 26 (225) | 1:57.59 (348) | 85.00 (293) | 11:18.74 (622) | 1488 |
| 3rd place, bronze medalist(s) | Belarus | Ilya Palazkov; Anastasiya Prokopenko | 20 (197) | 2:03.45 (330) | 79.00 (300) | 10:53.82 (647) | 1474 |
| 4 | Kazakhstan | Pavel Ilyashenko; Elena Potapenko | 22 (206) | 1:59.89 (341) | 78.00 (293) | 11:12.99 (628) | 1468 |
| 5 | Italy | Valerio Grasselli; Lavinia Bonessio | 26 (225) | 2:04.02 (328) | 87.00 (298) | 11:33.50 (607) | 1458 |
| 6 | Latvia | Pavels Svecovs; Jeļena Rubļevska | 34 (265) | 2:02.58 (333) | 92.00 (269) | 11:58.36 (582) | 1449 |
| 7 | Germany | Fabian Liebig; Ronja Döring | 23 (210) | 1:58.61 (345) | 88.00 (276) | 11:23.36 (617) | 1448 |
| 8 | Ukraine | Denys Pavlyuk; Valeriya Permykina | 21 (200) | 2:00.80 (338) | 84.00 (279) | 11:11.23 (629) | 1446 |
| 9 | Czech Republic | Ondřej Polívka; Barbora Kodedová | 29 (240) | 2:03.93 (329) | 119.00 (249) | 11:22.95 (618) | 1436 |
| 10 | Hungary | Tamara Alekszejev; Istvan Malits | 23 (212) | 2:06.14 (322) | 78.00 (286) | 11:26.42 (614) | 1434 |
| 11 | Poland | Jaroslaw Swiderski; Aleksandra Chmielewska | 19 (192) | 2:04.45 (327) | 85.00 (279) | 11:06.17 (634) | 1432 |
| 12 | South Korea | Kim Sun-woo; Lee Woo-jin | 25 (224) | 1:59.05 (343) | 91.00 (263) | 11:38.42 (602) | 1432 |
| 13 | Argentina | Sergio Villamayor; Ayelen Zapata | 19 (190) | 2:14.83 (296) | 80.00 (300) | 11:17.40 (623) | 1409 |
| 14 | United States | Lucas Schrimsher; Samantha Achterberg | 14 (167) | 2:00.85 (338) | 89.00 (279) | 11:19.64 (621) | 1405 |
| 15 | Mexico | Alvaro Sandoval; Mariana Arceo | 19 (192) | 2:02.59 (333) | 93.00 (268) | 11:35.69 (605) | 1398 |
| 16 | Guatemala | Jorge Imeri; Isabel Brand | 17 (180) | 2:02.65 (333) | 96.00 (275) | 11:47.29 (593) | 1381 |
| 17 | Ireland | Eanna Bailey; Sive Brassil | 16 (175) | 1:56.90 (350) | 106.00 (245) | 11:55.84 (585) | 1355 |
| 18 | Cuba | José Figueroa; Laura Leidis Moya | 12 (155) | 2:01.36 (336) | 95.00 (280) | 12:03.23 (577) | 1348 |
| 19 | Spain | Cristóbal Rodríguez; Marta Garcia-Miguel | 17 (182) | 2:00.31 (340) | 120.00 (221) | 11:46.60 (594) | 1337 |
| 20 | Japan | Tomoyuki Ono; Natsumi Tomonaga | 24 (216) | 1:58.48 (345) | EL (0) | 11:30.20 (610) | 1171 |
| 21 | Turkey | Canberk Hulusi Ekin; İpek Akşin | 21 (201) | 2:02.74 (332) | EL (0) | 11:30.26 (610) | 1143 |
| 22 | Chile | Benjamin Ortiz; Javiera Rosas | 19 (190) | 2:07.14 (319) | EL (0) | 11:57.05 (583) | 1092 |
| 23 | Lithuania | Justinas Kinderis; Laura Asadauskaitė | 21 (201) | 2:00.94 (338) | 105.00 (253) | DNS (0) | 792 |
