= Modern pentathlon at the 2020 Summer Olympics – Women's =

Women's modern pentathlon at the Games of the XXXII Olympiad
- Venues: Musashino Forest Sport Plaza (fencing); Tokyo Stadium (swimming, riding and laser run)
- Dates: 5–6 August 2021
- Competitors: 36 from 23 nations
- Winning total: 1385 OR

Medalists
1st place, gold medalist(s)		Kate French	Great Britain
2nd place, silver medalist(s)		Laura Asadauskaitė	Lithuania
3rd place, bronze medalist(s)		Sarolta Kovács	Hungary

The women's modern pentathlon at the 2020 Summer Olympics in Tokyo was held on 5 and 6 August 2021. Two venues were used: Musashino Forest Sport Plaza (fencing) and Tokyo Stadium (swimming, horse-riding and combined running and shooting).

== Schedule ==
All times are Japan Standard Time (UTC+9)

Date	Time	Round
Thursday, 5 August 2021	13:00	Fencing (Ranking Round)
Friday, 6 August 2021	14:30	Swimming
Friday, 6 August 2021	15:45	Fencing (Bonus Round)
Friday, 6 August 2021	17:15	Riding
Friday, 6 August 2021	19:30	Laser Run

== Results ==
Thirty-six athletes participated.

Key

♦ The highest mark recorded in each event is highlighted in yellow with a diamond symbol.

Rank	Athlete	Country	Swimming Time (pts)	Fencing RR+BR Victories (pts)	Riding Time (pts)	Laser run Time (pts)	Total
1st place, gold medalist(s)	Kate French	Great Britain	2:10.18 (290)	20+1 (221)	86.26 (294)	12:00.34 (580)	1385 OR
2nd place, silver medalist(s)	Laura Asadauskaitė	Lithuania	2:17.21 (276)	15+2 (192)	77.09 (300)^{♦}	11:38.37 (602)^{♦} OR	1370
3rd place, bronze medalist(s)	Sarolta Kovács	Hungary	2:07.71 (295)	20+1 (221)	77.19 (293)	12:21.42 (559)	1368
4	Alice Sotero	Italy	2:07.88 (295)	21+1 (227)	81.35 (285)	12:24.38 (556)	1363
5	İlke Özyüksel	Turkey	2:15.89 (279)	14+1 (185)	79.40 (293)	11:47.64 (593)	1350
6	Élodie Clouvel	France	2:07.51 (295)	16+0 (196)	74.08 (293)	12:17.78 (563)	1347
7	Gintarė Venčkauskaitė	Lithuania	2:18.37 (274)	12+1 (173)	72.74 (300)^{♦}	11:44.37 (596)	1343
8	Anastasiya Prokopenko	Belarus	2:25.01 (260)	18+0 (208)	83.49 (283)	11:49.38 (591)	1342
9	Uliana Batashova	ROC	2:11.14 (288)	23+1 (239)	77.61 (293)	12:59.27 (521)	1341
10	Marie Oteiza	France	2:10.15 (290)	19+1 (215)	87.70 (293)	12:44.75 (536)	1334
11	Kim Se-hee	South Korea	2:16.36 (278)	24+2 (246)	76.09 (286)	13:00.70 (520)	1330
12	Michelle Gulyás	Hungary	2:07.48 (296)	20+0 (220)	103.90 (243)	12:14.76 (566)	1325
13	Elena Potapenko	Kazakhstan	2:13.99 (283)	20+2 (222)	84.19 (289)	12:52.37 (528)	1322
14	Jo Muir	Great Britain	2:14.52 (281)	13+1 (179)	78.81 (293)	12:15.13 (565)	1318
15	Mayan Oliver	Mexico	2:24.16 (262)	16+0 (196)	76.62 (293)	12:21.48 (559)	1310
16	Mariana Arceo	Mexico	2:16.65 (277)	15+4 (184)	70.61 (293)	12:32.16 (548)	1302
17	Kim Sun-woo	South Korea	2:12.87 (285)	19+0 (214)	82.26 (284)	13:07.80 (513)	1296
18	Volha Silkina	Belarus	2:15.22 (280)	21+1 (217)	89.07 (274)	12:59.81 (521)	1292
19	Haydy Morsy	Egypt	2:24.35 (262)	20+1 (221)	80.91 (293)	13:07.69 (513)	1289
20	Anna Maliszewska	Poland	2:17.23 (276)	18+0 (208)	112.27 (234)	12:15.02 (565)	1283
21	Samantha Schultz	United States	2:15.78 (279)	9+1 (155)	84.37 (289)	12:25.56 (555)	1278
22	Zhang Xiaonan	China	2:21.44 (268)	19+0 (204)	76.22 (293)	13:10.16 (510)	1275
23	Rena Shimazu	Japan	2:10.65 (289)	14+0 (184)	90.72 (252)	12:34.40 (546)	1271
24	Natalya Coyle	Ireland	2:13.88 (283)	23+1 (239)	109.81 (234)	13:08.51 (512)	1268
25	Zhang Mingyu	China	2:15.23 (280)	16+3 (199)	75.69 (286)	13:17.67 (503)	1268
26	Leydi Moya	Cuba	2:17.96 (275)	15+1 (191)	89.20 (291)	13:16.65 (504)	1261
27	Marina Carrier	Australia	2:17.35 (276)	18+0 (208)	84.73 (296)	13:43.86 (477)	1257
28	Rebecca Langrehr	Germany	2:17.38 (276)	20+1 (221)	116.17 (220)	12:49.26 (531)	1248
29	Amira Kandil	Egypt	2:15.14 (280)	18+1 (199)	99.78 (250)	13:28.34 (492)	1221
30	Alise Fakhrutdinova	Uzbekistan	2:16.45 (278)	16+0 (196)	117.93 (226)	13:55.66 (465)	1165
31	Annika Schleu	Germany	2:16.99 (277)	29+0 (274)^{♦} OR	EL (0)	12:43.20 (537)	1088
32	Gulnaz Gubaydullina	ROC	2:07.31 (296)^{♦} OR	14+0 (184)	EL (0)	12:07.58 (573)	1053
33	Elena Micheli	Italy	2:09.22 (292)	17+6 (208)	EL (0)	12:31.91 (549)	1049
34	Natsumi Takamiya	Japan	2:11.54 (287)	14+1 (185)	EL (0)	13:07.72 (513)	985
35	Marcela Cuaspud	Ecuador	2:27.91 (255)	4+0 (124)	EL (0)	13:39.94 (481)	860
36	Maria Iêda Guimarães	Brazil	2:32.16 (246)	14+0 (184)	EL (0)	DNF (0)	430

== Records ==
Broken Olympic records during the 2020 Summer Olympics
Swimming	Gulnaz Gubaydullina (ROC)	2:07.31 (296 pts)
Fencing	Annika Schleu (GER)	29V (274 pts)
Laser run	Laura Asadauskaitė (LTU)	11:38.37 (602 pts)
Total	Kate French (GBR)	1385 pts

== Criticism of the Riding discipline ==
The riding discipline of the pentathlon attracted criticism after multiple athletes struggled to control their randomly-assigned horses. German modern pentathlete, Annika Schleu was leading the competition when she was unable to successfully complete the show jumping event, moving her from first to last place, and an eventual 31st place. The horse named Saint Boy was randomly assigned from a pool of 18, refused to jump three barriers in the second half of the equestrian course. Schleu's trainer Kim Raisner was sent home from the Olympics after footage showed her seemingly punch the horse for not performing in a desired manner. She also instructed Schleu herself to hit the horse, allegedly using the words "really hit it".

The sport's governing body stated that it had reviewed video footage that showed Raisner appearing to strike the horse. Schleu also faced backlash against her repeated use of the whip and rough handling of the horse. Both Schleu and Raisner faced legal action, with the German Animal Welfare Association filing a criminal complaint against the pair on 13 August 2021. Raisner was later required to attend a coach education seminar that included a module on animal welfare and humane treatment.

Russian modern pentathlete Gulnaz Gubaydullina started off by showing the best result in swimming, setting an Olympic Record (2:07.31). However, she was eliminated in the third stage, after Saint Boy, also randomly assigned to her, refused to continue jumping, leaving her without a medal at the end, although having the 6th best time in the final stage.

The incident prompted German Olympic team member and equestrian medal record holder Isabell Werth to criticize modern pentathlon's use of horses; she stated that "Pentathlon has nothing to do with equestrian sport" and treats horses as "a means of transport to which the athletes have no connection." Werth also expressed sympathy for Schleu, whom she saw as a victim of the system of the sport.

In response to this issue, modern pentathlon's governing body, Union Internationale de Pentathlon Moderne (UIPM), voted to remove horse riding from its programme at the 2028 Olympic Games.
