= Modern pentathlon at the 2014 Asian Games – Women's individual =

Women's individual at the 2014 Asian Games
- Venue: Dream Park
- Date: 2 October 2014
- Competitors: 21 from 6 nations

Medalists
gold medal	Chen Qian	China
silver medal	Yang Soo-jin	South Korea
bronze medal	Choi Min-ji	South Korea

The women's individual modern pentathlon competition at the 2014 Asian Games in Incheon was held on 2 October 2014.

== Schedule ==
All times are Korea Standard Time (UTC+09:00)

Date	Time	Event
Thursday, 2 October 2014	08:30	Fencing
Thursday, 2 October 2014	11:45	Swimming
Thursday, 2 October 2014	13:50	Riding
Thursday, 2 October 2014	16:00	Combined event

== Results ==
Legend

- DNS — Did not start
- EL — Eliminated

=== Fencing ===
Rank	Athlete	Won	Lost	Pen.	Points
1	Chen Qian (CHN)	32	8		270
2	Liang Wanxia (CHN)	31	9		265
3	Yang Soo-jin (KOR)	30	10		260
4	Arina Jiyenbalanova (KAZ)	29	11		255
5	Choi Min-ji (KOR)	28	12		250
6	Wang Wei (CHN)	25	15		235
6	Xeniya Alexandrova (KAZ)	25	15		235
8	Atsuko Itani (JPN)	24	16		230
8	Darya Khalzova (KAZ)	24	16		230
10	Narumi Kurosu (JPN)	23	17		225
11	Bian Yufei (CHN)	22	18		220
12	Rena Shimazu (JPN)	20	20		210
12	Jeong Min-a (KOR)	20	20		210
12	Kim Sun-woo (KOR)	20	20		210
15	Shino Yamanaka (JPN)	18	22		200
16	Yenglik Sharip (KAZ)	13	27		175
17	Ekaterina Niiazova (KGZ)	12	28		170
18	Arina Djonalieva (UZB)	6	34		140
19	Violetta Pogiba (KGZ)	5	35		135
19	Alina Meremianina (KGZ)	5	35		135
21	Alina Singkh (KGZ)	4	36		130

=== Swimming ===
Rank	Athlete	Time	Pen.	Points
1	Choi Min-ji (KOR)	2:14.28		298
2	Bian Yufei (CHN)	2:14.69		296
3	Jeong Min-a (KOR)	2:15.15		295
4	Rena Shimazu (JPN)	2:15.50		294
5	Chen Qian (CHN)	2:17.85		287
6	Kim Sun-woo (KOR)	2:18.15		286
7	Yang Soo-jin (KOR)	2:18.17		286
8	Liang Wanxia (CHN)	2:18.25		286
9	Narumi Kurosu (JPN)	2:18.74		284
10	Atsuko Itani (JPN)	2:20.40		279
11	Wang Wei (CHN)	2:20.46		279
12	Darya Khalzova (KAZ)	2:22.42		273
13	Shino Yamanaka (JPN)	2:27.75		257
14	Arina Jiyenbalanova (KAZ)	2:30.24		250
15	Xeniya Alexandrova (KAZ)	2:33.89		239
16	Violetta Pogiba (KGZ)	2:34.99		236
17	Yenglik Sharip (KAZ)	2:35.58		234
18	Ekaterina Niiazova (KGZ)	2:39.53		222
19	Arina Djonalieva (UZB)	2:46.14		202
20	Alina Singkh (KGZ)	2:46.46		201
21	Alina Meremianina (KGZ)	2:47.53		198

=== Riding ===
Rank	Athlete	Horse	Time	Penalties		Points
Rank	Athlete	Horse	Time	Jump	Time	Points
1	Choi Min-ji (KOR)	Ladori	1:03.63			300
2	Yang Soo-jin (KOR)	Urano	1:02.94	7		293
3	Narumi Kurosu (JPN)	Countryman	1:04.87	7	1	292
4	Bian Yufei (CHN)	Chiantee	1:11.20		8	292
5	Xeniya Alexandrova (KAZ)	Churchill	1:02.00	14		286
6	Jeong Min-a (KOR)	International	1:04.20	14	1	285
7	Shino Yamanaka (JPN)	Charles	1:11.49	7	8	285
8	Rena Shimazu (JPN)	Karsen	1:11.05	14	8	278
9	Chen Qian (CHN)	Lonza	1:07.11	21	4	275
10	Darya Khalzova (KAZ)	Kalua	1:07.72	21	4	275
11	Kim Sun-woo (KOR)	Kodalmae	1:12.35	28	9	263
12	Yenglik Sharip (KAZ)	Checky	1:25.37	45	22	233
—	Atsuko Itani (JPN)	Galaxy	EL			0
—	Liang Wanxia (CHN)	Olgas	EL			0
—	Wang Wei (CHN)	Chunma	EL			0
—	Ekaterina Niiazova (KGZ)	Bambam	EL			0
—	Violetta Pogiba (KGZ)	Lechamp	EL			0
—	Arina Jiyenbalanova (KAZ)	Nabu	EL			0
—	Alina Singkh (KGZ)	Limaro	EL			0
—	Arina Djonalieva (UZB)	Chockper	DNS			0
—	Alina Meremianina (KGZ)	Jampano	DNS			0

=== Combined event ===
Rank	Athlete	Time	Pen.	Points
1	Arina Jiyenbalanova (KAZ)	12:51.57		529
2	Shino Yamanaka (JPN)	12:55.33		525
3	Liang Wanxia (CHN)	13:00.33		520
4	Chen Qian (CHN)	13:04.27		516
5	Wang Wei (CHN)	13:10.49		510
6	Rena Shimazu (JPN)	13:26.29		494
7	Kim Sun-woo (KOR)	13:29.96		491
8	Narumi Kurosu (JPN)	13:46.74		474
9	Yang Soo-jin (KOR)	13:47.11		473
10	Bian Yufei (CHN)	13:49.92		471
11	Jeong Min-a (KOR)	13:50.62		470
12	Xeniya Alexandrova (KAZ)	14:04.03		456
13	Choi Min-ji (KOR)	14:10.53		450
14	Darya Khalzova (KAZ)	14:10.68		450
15	Atsuko Itani (JPN)	14:27.63		433
16	Yenglik Sharip (KAZ)	15:23.68		377
17	Alina Meremianina (KGZ)	16:17.65		323
18	Alina Singkh (KGZ)	16:57.93		283
19	Ekaterina Niiazova (KGZ)	17:21.51		259
20	Arina Djonalieva (UZB)	19:18.76		142
—	Violetta Pogiba (KGZ)	DNS		0

=== Summary ===
Rank	Athlete	Fence	Swim	Ride	Comb.	Total	Time
1st place, gold medalist(s)	Chen Qian (CHN)	270	287	275	516	1348	
2nd place, silver medalist(s)	Yang Soo-jin (KOR)	260	286	293	473	1312	+0:36
3rd place, bronze medalist(s)	Choi Min-ji (KOR)	250	298	300	450	1298	+0:50
4	Bian Yufei (CHN)	220	296	292	471	1279	+1:09
5	Rena Shimazu (JPN)	210	294	278	494	1276	+1:12
6	Narumi Kurosu (JPN)	225	284	292	474	1275	+1:13
7	Shino Yamanaka (JPN)	200	257	285	525	1267	+1:21
8	Jeong Min-a (KOR)	210	295	285	470	1260	+1:28
9	Kim Sun-woo (KOR)	210	286	263	491	1250	+1:38
10	Darya Khalzova (KAZ)	230	273	275	450	1228	+2:00
11	Xeniya Alexandrova (KAZ)	235	239	286	456	1216	+2:12
12	Liang Wanxia (CHN)	265	286	0	520	1071	+4:37
13	Arina Jiyenbalanova (KAZ)	255	250	0	529	1034	+5:14
14	Wang Wei (CHN)	235	279	0	510	1024	+5:24
15	Yenglik Sharip (KAZ)	175	234	233	377	1019	+5:29
16	Atsuko Itani (JPN)	230	279	0	433	942	+6:46
17	Alina Meremianina (KGZ)	135	198	0	323	656	+11:32
18	Ekaterina Niiazova (KGZ)	170	222	0	259	651	+11:37
19	Alina Singkh (KGZ)	130	201	0	283	614	+12:14
20	Arina Djonalieva (UZB)	140	202	0	142	484	+14:24
21	Violetta Pogiba (KGZ)	135	236	0	0	371	
