= 2016 World Modern Pentathlon Championships – Women's relay =

Women's relay at the 2016 UIPM Senior World Championships
- Dates: May 23
- Competitors: 14 from 7 nations
- Winning points: 1419

Medalists
gold medal	Annika Schleu; Lena Schöneborn	Germany
silver medal	Joanna Muir; Samantha Murray	Great Britain
bronze medal	Katsiaryna Arol; Iryna Prasiantsova	Belarus

The women's relay at the 2016 UIPM Senior World Championships was held on 23 May 2016.

== Results ==
Breakdown is as follows:

Rank	Country	Athletes	Fencing Victories (pts)	Swimming Time (pts)	Riding Time (pts)	Combined Time (pts)	Total
1st place, gold medalist(s)	Germany	Annika Schleu; Lena Schöneborn	17 (202)	2:06.25 (322)	83.00 (300)	11:45.05 (595)	1419
2nd place, silver medalist(s)	Great Britain	Joanna Muir; Samantha Murray	17 (204)	2:04.24 (328)	85.00 (300)	12:03.01 (577)	1409
3rd place, bronze medalist(s)	Belarus	Katsiaryna Arol; Iryna Prasiantsova	19 (215)	2:10.89 (308)	83.00 (279)	11:37.08 (603)	1405
4	Russia	Sofia Serkina; Anastasia Petrova	23 (240)	2:02.20 (334)	88.00 (290)	12:47.50 (533)	1397
5	Italy	Alessandra Frezza; Lavinia Bonessio	21 (227)	2:09.71 (311)	81.00 (286)	12:09.00 (571)	1395
6	South Korea	Kim Sun-woo; Yang Soo-jin	18 (209)	2:07.40 (318)	82.00 (300)	12:23.00 (557)	1384
7	Mexico	Mariana Arceo; Tamara Vega	9 (154)	2:08.71 (314)	95.00 (280)	13:31.80 (489)	1237
