= Modern pentathlon at the 2014 Asian Games – Women's team =

Women's team at the 2014 Asian Games
- Venue: Dream Park
- Date: 2 October 2014
- Competitors: 20 from 5 nations

Medalists
gold medal	South Korea; Choi Min-ji, Jeong Min-a, Kim Sun-woo, Yang Soo-jin
silver medal	Japan; Atsuko Itani, Narumi Kurosu, Rena Shimazu, Shino Yamanaka
bronze medal	China; Bian Yufei, Chen Qian, Liang Wanxia, Wang Wei

The women's team modern pentathlon competition at the 2014 Asian Games in Incheon was held on 2 October 2014.

== Schedule ==
All times are Korea Standard Time (UTC+09:00)

Date	Time	Event
Thursday, 2 October 2014	08:30	Fencing
Thursday, 2 October 2014	11:45	Swimming
Thursday, 2 October 2014	13:50	Riding
Thursday, 2 October 2014	16:00	Combined event

== Results ==
Rank	Team	Fence	Swim	Ride	Comb.	Total
1st place, gold medalist(s)	South Korea (KOR)	930	1165	1141	1884	5120
	Choi Min-ji	250	298	300	450	1298
	Jeong Min-a	210	295	285	470	1260
	Kim Sun-woo	210	286	263	491	1250
	Yang Soo-jin	260	286	293	473	1312
2nd place, silver medalist(s)	Japan (JPN)	865	1114	855	1926	4760
	Atsuko Itani	230	279	0	433	942
	Narumi Kurosu	225	284	292	474	1275
	Rena Shimazu	210	294	278	494	1276
	Shino Yamanaka	200	257	285	525	1267
3rd place, bronze medalist(s)	China (CHN)	990	1148	567	2017	4722
	Bian Yufei	220	296	292	471	1279
	Chen Qian	270	287	275	516	1348
	Liang Wanxia	265	286	0	520	1071
	Wang Wei	235	279	0	510	1024
4	Kazakhstan (KAZ)	895	996	794	1812	4497
	Xeniya Alexandrova	235	239	286	456	1216
	Arina Jiyenbalanova	255	250	0	529	1034
	Darya Khalzova	230	273	275	450	1228
	Yenglik Sharip	175	234	233	377	1019
5	Kyrgyzstan (KGZ)	570	857	0	865	2292
	Alina Meremianina	135	198	0	323	656
	Ekaterina Niiazova	170	222	0	259	651
	Violetta Pogiba	135	236	0	0	371
	Alina Singkh	130	201	0	283	614
