= Modern pentathlon at the 2016 Summer Olympics =

Modern pentathlon at the Games of the XXXI Olympiad
- Venue: Deodoro Aquatics Centre; Deodoro Stadium; Youth Arena
- Dates: 18–20 August 2016
- No. of events: 2
- Competitors: 72 from 28 nations

The modern pentathlon at the 2016 Summer Olympics in Rio de Janeiro took place from 19 to 20 August 2016 at Deodoro Aquatics Centre, Deodoro Stadium, and Youth Arena.

Thirty-six athletes competed each in the men's and women's events. Initially the Union Internationale de Pentathlon Moderne (UIPM) proposed that all five events be staged in the same arena. While this did not eventuate, all venues were within approximately 300.0 metres (984.3 ft) of each other.

== Format ==
Modern pentathlon contained five events; pistol shooting, épée fencing, 200.0 metres (656.2 ft) freestyle swimming, show jumping, and a 3.200 kilometres (1.988 mi) cross-country run.

The first three events (fencing, swimming, and show jumping) were scored on a points system. Those points were then converted into a time handicap for the final combined event (pistol shooting and cross-country running), with the points leader starting first and each other competitor having a delayed start based on how many points behind the leader they were. This results in the finish order of the run being the final ranking for the event.

Unlike previous games, the fencing event consisted of two rounds: the traditional round-robin stage plus a "bonus round." In the round-robin, each competitor faced every other competitor in a one-touch bout. The competitors were ranked according to how many victories they earn. The bonus round was held on one piste in a ladder, knock-out system. The two lowest-ranked competitors from the round-robin faced each other in another one-touch bout; the winner was credited with an additional point (round-robin victories being worth 6 points) and advanced to face the next-lowest ranked competitor. This continued, up the ranking ladder, until all competitors had competed in the bonus round.

The swimming portion consisted of a 200-metre freestyle race, with score based on time.

The show jumping competition involved riding an unfamiliar horse over a course with 12 obstacles. The score was based on penalties for fallen bars, refusals, falls, and being over the time limit.

The combined running and pistol shooting events remain unchanged from the new combined format from 2012; athletes face four rounds of shooting each followed by an 800.0 metres (874.9 yd) run. In each of the four rounds of firing, they must shoot five targets, loading the gun after every shot, and then being permitted to resume their running. Misses are not explicitly penalized, but practically result in the competitor taking longer to score five hits. After 70 seconds, even if the competitor has not scored five hits, they move on to the next leg of the run.

== Qualification ==
Thirty-six athletes had to qualify for each of the two events; a maximum of two per gender from any nation. Qualification methods were the same for both the men's and women's events.

The host nation Brazil had been guaranteed a single place each in the men's and women's events, while two invitational places would be allocated by UIPM once the rest of the qualifiers were decided.

Between January and August 2015, the initial distribution of quotas to the athletes had taken place based on the competition results. Five continental championships afforded twenty places each per gender: one each from Africa and Oceania, five from Asia, eight from Europe, and five from the Americas with a maximum of one quota per NOC (winners from NORCECA and South America, and top three from the 2015 Pan American Games in Toronto, Canada). Qualified athletes will also be the winner of the 2015 UIPM World Cup final (held in Minsk, Belarus from June 12 to 14) and the top three finishers at the World Championships in Berlin, Germany, held between June 28 and July 6, 2015.

The top three ranked athletes, having not qualified by any means, were awarded a place at the 2016 UIPM World Championships in Moscow, Russia, while the remaining seven were based on the pentathlon's world rankings as of June 1, 2016.

== Participating ==
=== Participating nations ===
- Argentina (2)
- Australia (2)
- Belarus (1)
- Brazil (2)
- Bulgaria (1)
- Canada (2)
- China (4)
- Cuba (2)
- Czech Republic (3)
- Egypt (3)
- France (3)
- Germany (4)
- Great Britain (4)
- Guatemala (2)
- Hungary (4)
- Ireland (2)
- Italy (4)
- Japan (3)
- Kazakhstan (2)
- Latvia (1)
- Lithuania (3)
- Mexico (2)
- Poland (3)
- South Korea (3)
- Russia (3)
- Turkey (1)
- Ukraine (3)
- United States (3)

== Medalists ==
Event	Gold	Silver	Bronze
Men's	Aleksander Lesun; Russia	Pavlo Tymoshchenko; Ukraine	Ismael Hernández; Mexico
Women's	Chloe Esposito; Australia	Élodie Clouvel; France	Oktawia Nowacka; Poland

== Medal summary ==
=== Medal table ===
Rank	Nation	Gold	Silver	Bronze	Total
1	Australia	1	0	0	1
1	Russia	1	0	0	1
3	France	0	1	0	1
3	Ukraine	0	1	0	1
5	Mexico	0	0	1	1
5	Poland	0	0	1	1
Totals (6 entries)		2	2	2	6
