= Modern pentathlon at the 2022 Asian Games – Women's individual =

Modern pentathlon event

Women's individual at the 2022 Asian Games
- Venue: Fuyang Yinhu Sports Centre
- Date: 20–24 September 2023
- Competitors: 19 from 7 nations

Medalists
gold medal	Zhang Mingyu	China
silver medal	Kim Sun-woo	South Korea
bronze medal	Bian Yufei	China

The women's individual modern pentathlon competition at the 2022 Asian Games in Hangzhou was held on 20 and 24 September 2023.

Due to a lack of participants, the women's semifinals, initially scheduled for 21 September were cancelled.

== Schedule ==
All times are China Standard Time (UTC+08:00)

Date	Time	Event
Wednesday, 20 September 2023	10:00	Fencing ranking round
Sunday, 24 September 2023	10:00	Riding
Sunday, 24 September 2023	10:50	Fencing bonus round
Sunday, 24 September 2023	11:20	Swimming
Sunday, 24 September 2023	12:00	Laser-run

== Results ==
Legend

- DNS — Did not start
- EL — Eliminated

=== Fencing ranking round ===
Rank	Athlete	Won	Lost	Pen.	Points
1	Bian Yufei (CHN)	28	8		265
2	Kim Sun-woo (KOR)	26	10		255
3	Kim Se-hee (KOR)	23	13		240
4	Alise Fakhrutdinova (UZB)	23	13		240
4	Anastassiya Kochetkova (KAZ)	23	13		240
6	Zhang Mingyu (CHN)	23	13		240
7	Seong Seung-min (KOR)	22	14		235
8	Xie Linzhi (CHN)	22	14		235
9	Misaki Uchida (JPN)	19	17		220
10	Kanae Umemura (JPN)	19	17		220
11	Zhong Xiuting (CHN)	18	18		215
12	Yelena Potapenko (KAZ)	18	18		215
13	Jang Ha-eun (KOR)	15	21		200
14	Lyudmila Yakovleva (KAZ)	15	21		200
15	Hana Shibata (JPN)	12	24		185
16	Samira Abzalova (UZB)	10	26		175
17	Kristina Ryabova (KAZ)	8	28		165
18	Mariia Shtukina (KGZ)	7	29		160
19	Caroline Andita Bangun (INA)	7	29		160

=== Riding ===
Rank	Athlete	Horse	Time	Penalties			Points
Rank	Athlete	Horse	Time	Jump	Time	Other	Points
1	Yelena Potapenko (KAZ)	Niu Man	1:01.27				300
2	Zhong Xiuting (CHN)	Duo Meng	1:00.95				300
3	Zhang Mingyu (CHN)	M373	57.39				300
4	Bian Yufei (CHN)	Da Hei	54.06				300
5	Kim Sun-woo (KOR)	Ru Yi	1:03.46		1		299
6	Kanae Umemura (JPN)	K254	1:06.01		4		296
7	Xie Linzhi (CHN)	K324	1:03.07	7	1		292
8	Alise Fakhrutdinova (UZB)	Ka Fei	1:04.68	7	2		291
9	Misaki Uchida (JPN)	K174	1:02.74	14			286
10	Lyudmila Yakovleva (KAZ)	K381	1:01.72	31			269
—	Kim Se-hee (KOR)	Yang Guang	EL				0
—	Jang Ha-eun (KOR)	D199	EL				0
—	Hana Shibata (JPN)	H313	EL				0
—	Kristina Ryabova (KAZ)	Dai An Na	EL				0
—	Mariia Shtukina (KGZ)	P340	EL				0
—	Caroline Andita Bangun (INA)	Qing Yi	EL				0
—	Anastassiya Kochetkova (KAZ)	Ji Xiang	EL				0
—	Seong Seung-min (KOR)	K333	EL				0
—	Samira Abzalova (UZB)	Bai Bao	DNS				0

=== Swimming ===
Rank	Athlete	Time	Pen.	Points
1	Misaki Uchida (JPN)	2:07.80		295
2	Hana Shibata (JPN)	2:10.26		290
3	Bian Yufei (CHN)	2:13.21		284
4	Kim Sun-woo (KOR)	2:13.61		283
5	Zhang Mingyu (CHN)	2:14.70		281
6	Xie Linzhi (CHN)	2:15.61		279
7	Seong Seung-min (KOR)	2:15.65		279
8	Anastassiya Kochetkova (KAZ)	2:16.60		277
9	Kim Se-hee (KOR)	2:16.90		277
10	Caroline Andita Bangun (INA)	2:17.14		276
11	Kanae Umemura (JPN)	2:17.44		276
12	Yelena Potapenko (KAZ)	2:18.43		274
13	Zhong Xiuting (CHN)	2:19.45		272
14	Alise Fakhrutdinova (UZB)	2:20.52		269
15	Lyudmila Yakovleva (KAZ)	2:21.85		267
16	Jang Ha-eun (KOR)	2:22.67		265
17	Samira Abzalova (UZB)	2:31.36		248
18	Kristina Ryabova (KAZ)	2:37.49		236
—	Mariia Shtukina (KGZ)	DNS		0

=== Laser-run ===
Rank	Athlete	Time	Pen.	Points
1	Jang Ha-eun (KOR)	11:42.27		598
2	Kim Se-hee (KOR)	11:57.07		583
3	Zhang Mingyu (CHN)	11:57.58		583
4	Seong Seung-min (KOR)	12:06.74		574
5	Samira Abzalova (UZB)	12:25.32		555
6	Misaki Uchida (JPN)	12:29.28		551
7	Yelena Potapenko (KAZ)	12:31.62		549
8	Kim Sun-woo (KOR)	12:31.95		549
9	Kanae Umemura (JPN)	12:38.08		542
10	Hana Shibata (JPN)	12:40.50		540
11	Zhong Xiuting (CHN)	12:55.31		525
12	Alise Fakhrutdinova (UZB)	12:59.53		521
13	Bian Yufei (CHN)	12:59.57		521
14	Lyudmila Yakovleva (KAZ)	13:25.32		495
15	Xie Linzhi (CHN)	14:04.28		456
16	Kristina Ryabova (KAZ)	14:15.02		445
17	Caroline Andita Bangun (INA)	14:42.07		418
18	Anastassiya Kochetkova (KAZ)	14:46.66		414
—	Mariia Shtukina (KGZ)	DNS		0

=== Summary ===
Rank	Athlete	Ride	Fence RR+BR	Swim	L-run	Total	Time
1st place, gold medalist(s)	Zhang Mingyu (CHN)	300	240 + 2	281	583	1406	
2nd place, silver medalist(s)	Kim Sun-woo (KOR)	299	255 + 0	283	549	1386	+0:20
3rd place, bronze medalist(s)	Bian Yufei (CHN)	300	265 + 4	284	521	1374	+0:32
4	Misaki Uchida (JPN)	286	220 + 2	295	551	1354	+0:52
5	Yelena Potapenko (KAZ)	300	215 + 2	274	549	1340	+1:06
6	Kanae Umemura (JPN)	296	220 + 2	276	542	1336	+1:10
7	Alise Fakhrutdinova (UZB)	291	240 + 6	269	521	1327	+1:19
8	Zhong Xiuting (CHN)	300	215 + 2	272	525	1314	+1:32
9	Xie Linzhi (CHN)	292	235 + 4	279	456	1266	+2:20
10	Lyudmila Yakovleva (KAZ)	269	200 + 4	267	495	1235	+2:51
11	Kim Se-hee (KOR)	0	240 + 0	277	583	1100	+5:06
12	Seong Seung-min (KOR)	0	235 + 0	279	574	1088	+5:18
13	Jang Ha-eun (KOR)	0	200 + 0	265	598	1063	+5:43
14	Hana Shibata (JPN)	0	185 + 0	290	540	1015	+6:31
15	Samira Abzalova (UZB)	0	175 + 0	248	555	978	+7:08
16	Anastassiya Kochetkova (KAZ)	0	240 + 2	277	414	933	+7:53
17	Caroline Andita Bangun (INA)	0	160 + 6	276	418	860	+9:06
18	Kristina Ryabova (KAZ)	0	165 + 0	236	445	846	+9:20
19	Mariia Shtukina (KGZ)	0	160 + 0	0	0	160	
