= Modern pentathlon at the 2016 Summer Olympics – Women's =

Women's modern pentathlon at the Games of the XXXI Olympiad
- Venues: Deodoro Aquatics Centre (swimming); Deodoro Stadium (riding and combined); Youth Arena (fencing)
- Dates: 18–19 August 2016
- Competitors: 36 from 26 nations
- Winning total: 1372 OR

Medalists
1st place, gold medalist(s)		Chloe Esposito	Australia
2nd place, silver medalist(s)		Élodie Clouvel	France
3rd place, bronze medalist(s)		Oktawia Nowacka	Poland

The women's modern pentathlon at the 2016 Summer Olympics in Rio de Janeiro was held on 19 August. Three venues were used: Deodoro Aquatics Centre (swimming), Deodoro Stadium (horse-riding and combined running and shooting) and Youth Arena (fencing).

The medals were presented by Claudia Bokel, IOC member, Germany and Klaus Schormann, President of the UIPM.

== Competition format ==
The sport of Modern Pentathlon consists of five disciplines. The format was slightly different from the typical Modern Pentathlon, with two events combined at the end which is now referred to as the Laser Run.^{[2]}

- Fencing: A round-robin, one-touch épée competition. Score was based on the number of victories.
- Swimming: A 200 m freestyle race. Score was based on time.
- Riding Show Jumping: A show jumping competition. Score based on penalties for fallen bars, refusals, falls, and being over the time limit.
- Laser Run: the final Laser Run event is incredibly exciting. Athletes are seeded in order of their total points accumulated from the three previous sports. The number of seconds each athlete starts after the highest-ranked competitor is determined by their points difference. Following a short burst run to the laser targets, the athlete must complete five shots on the target's bullseye within 50 seconds. Next comes an 800-metre run. After three more Laser Run legs, the first athlete crossing the finish line wins.

== Schedule ==
All times are UTC-3

Date	Time	Round
Thursday, 18 August 2016	10:00	Fencing (Ranking Round)
Friday, 19 August 2016	12:00	Swimming
Friday, 19 August 2016	14:00	Fencing (Bonus Round)
Friday, 19 August 2016	15:30	Riding Show Jumping
Friday, 19 August 2016	18:00	Laser Run

== Results ==
Thirty-six athletes participated.

Key

♦ The highest mark recorded in each event is highlighted in yellow with a diamond symbol.

Rank	Athlete	Country	Swimming Time (pts)	Fencing Victories (pts)	Riding Time (pts)	Laser Run Time (pts)	Total
1st place, gold medalist(s)	Chloe Esposito	Australia	2:12.38 (303)	19 (215)	77.60 (284)	12:10.19 (570)	1372 OR
2nd place, silver medalist(s)	Élodie Clouvel	France	2:08.62 (315)	21 (227)	70.05 (293)	12:59.06 (521)	1356
3rd place, bronze medalist(s)	Oktawia Nowacka	Poland	2:16.67 (290)	27 (264)^{♦}	70.69 (293)	13:18.50 (502)	1349
DSQ	Chen Qian	China	2:18.75 (284)	22 (232)	76.67 (292)	12:45.07 (535)	1343
4	Annika Schleu	Germany	2:19.34 (282)	17 (202)	68.06 (293)	12:21.95 (559)	1336
5	Kate French	Great Britain	2:16.17 (292)	17 (202)	75.49 (300)^{♦}	12:43.08 (537)	1331
6	Natalya Coyle	Ireland	2:17.38 (288)	19 (215)	73.69 (300)^{♦}	12:58.13 (522)	1325
7	Alice Sotero	Italy	2:12.63 (303)	20 (221)	72.91 (279)	13:00.47 (520)	1323
8	Samantha Murray	Great Britain	2:10.81 (308)	14 (192)	73.23 (279)	12:38.54 (542)	1321
9	Yelena Potapenko	Kazakhstan	2:11.52 (306)	17 (202)	73.74 (293)	13:07.48 (513)	1314
10	Tamara Vega	Mexico	2:16.89 (290)	15 (190)	72.93 (300)^{♦}	12:49.39 (531)	1311
11	Donata Rimšaitė	Russia	2:22.09 (274)	17 (202)	77.20 (284)	12:32.67 (548)	1308
12	Natsumi Tomonaga	Japan	2:15.63 (294)	15 (190)	77.03 (298)	12:55.44 (525)	1307
13	Kim Sun-woo	South Korea	2:16.06 (292)	16 (197)	75.52 (300)^{♦}	13:04.28 (516)	1305
14	Gulnaz Gubaydullina	Russia	2:07.94 (317)^{♦} OR	8 (148)	78.91 (290)	12:30.76 (550)	1305
15	Melanie McCann	Canada	2:20.81 (278)	23 (240)	75.75 (300)^{♦}	13:42.43 (478)	1296
16	Sarolta Kovács	Hungary	2:09.02 (313)	17 (203)	79.04 (268)	13:17.09 (503)	1287
17	Zhang Xiaonan	China	2:22.67 (272)	22 (234)	75.72 (279)	13:20.79 (500)	1285
18	Anna Maliszewska	Poland	2:20.30 (280)	16 (200)	79.41 (282)	13:01.21 (519)	1281
19	Margaux Isaksen	United States	2:19.91 (281)	18 (209)	70.24 (293)	13:23.90 (497)	1280
20	Isabel Brand	Guatemala	2:22.57 (273)	14 (184)	72.88 (293)	12:54.11 (526)	1276
21	Anastasiya Prokopenko	Belarus	2:25.69 (263)	10 (162)	76.28 (289)	12:22.98 (558)	1272
22	Yane Marques	Brazil	2:14.30 (298)	16 (196)	72.28 (286)	13:31.64 (489)	1269
23	Claudia Cesarini	Italy	2:20.85 (278)	17 (205)	87.95 (261)	13:04.34 (516)	1260
24	Isabella Isaksen	United States	2:20.20 (280)	20 (221)	80.31 (285)	13:51.96 (469)	1255
25	Barbora Kodedová	Czech Republic	2:24.70 (266)	20 (220)	106.28 (249)	13:25.36 (495)	1230
26	Zsófia Földházi	Hungary	2:12.05 (304)	11 (168)	119.34 (222)	12:46.02 (534)	1228
27	Iryna Khokhlova	Argentina	2:19.77 (281)	14 (184)	90.01 (268)	13:53.53 (467)	1200
28	Ieva Serapinaitė	Lithuania	2:14.43 (297)	15 (190)	69.50 (265)	14:29.68 (431)	1183
29	Anastasiya Spas	Ukraine	2:14.54 (297)	16 (196)	120.69 (221)	15:16.82 (384)	1098
30	Laura Asadauskaite	Lithuania	2:21.01 (277)	19 (216)	E (0)	12:01.01 (579)^{♦} OR	1072
31	Lena Schöneborn	Germany	2:21.74 (275)	24 (244)	E (0)	12:54.21 (526)	1045
32	Donna Vakalis	Canada	2:22.12 (274)	22 (233)	E (0)	13:36.19 (484)	991
33	Leydi Moya	Cuba	2:15.75 (293)	14 (184)	E (0)	13:11.07 (509)	986
34	İlke Özyüksel	Turkey	2:17.79 (287)	10 (160)	E (0)	12:49.98 (531)	978
35	Haydy Morsy	Egypt	2:26.11 (262)	14 (184)	E (0)	13:24.93 (496)	942

== Records ==
Broken Olympic records during the 2016 Summer Olympics
Total	Chloe Esposito (AUS)	1372 pts.
Swimming	Gulnaz Gubaydullina (RUS)	2:07.94
Running	Laura Asadauskaitė (LTU)	11:16.40
Laser Run	Laura Asadauskaitė (LTU)	12:01.01
Shooting - 1 session of 5 shots	Zsófia Földházi (HUN)	8.56
Shooting - 4 session of 20 shots	Zsófia Földházi (HUN)	39.62
