= Modern pentathlon at the 2018 Asian Games =

- Venue: APM Equestrian Center
- Dates: 31 August – 1 September 2018
- Competitors: 28 from 8 nations

Modern pentathlon at the 2018 Asian Games was held at the APM Equestrian Center, Tigaraksa, Tangerang Regency, Banten, Indonesia. It was held from 31 August to 1 September 2018.

Modern pentathlon contained five events; pistol shooting, épée fencing, 200.0 metres (656.2 ft) freestyle swimming, show jumping, and a 3.200 kilometres (1.988 mi) cross-country run.

The first three events (fencing, swimming, and show jumping) were scored on a points system. Those points were then converted into a time handicap for the final combined event (pistol shooting and cross-country running), with the points leader starting first and each other competitor having a delayed start based on how many points behind the leader they were. This results in the finish order of the run being the final ranking for the event.

== Schedule ==
F	Final

Event↓/Date →	31st Fri	1st Sat
Men's individual		F
Women's individual	F	

== Medalists ==
Event	Gold	Silver	Bronze
Men's individual	Jun Woong-tae; South Korea	Lee Ji-hun; South Korea	Luo Shuai; China
Women's individual	Zhang Mingyu; China	Kim Se-hee; South Korea	Kim Sun-woo; South Korea

== Medal table ==
Rank	Nation	Gold	Silver	Bronze	Total
1	South Korea (KOR)	1	2	1	4
2	China (CHN)	1	0	1	2
Totals (2 entries)		2	2	2	6

== Participating nations ==
A total of 28 athletes from 8 nations competed in modern pentathlon at the 2018 Asian Games:

- China (4)
- Indonesia (4)
- Japan (4)
- Kazakhstan (4)
- Kyrgyzstan (3)
- Mongolia (1)
- South Korea (4)
- Thailand (4)
