= Yelena Potapenko =

Kazakhstani modern pentathlete

Personal information
- Born: 20 April 1993 (age 33) Luhansk, Ukraine
- Height: 164 cm (5 ft 5 in)
- Weight: 52 kg (115 lb)

Sport
- Country: Kazakhstan
- Sport: Modern pentathlon

Yelena Potapenko (Елена Потапенко, born 20 April 1993) also spelled Elena or Olena, is a Ukraine-born Kazakhstani modern pentathlete.

At the 2016 World Championships, she competed in the women's individual event (30th place) and the mixed relay (4th place with Pavel Ilyashenko). At the 2024 World Cup, she competed with the Kazakhstan team which finished in 7th place.

Potapenko participated in the women's events at the 2016 Summer Olympics (10th place), the 2020 Summer Olympics (13th place) and the 2024 Summer Olympics (30th place).

She also competed at the 2018 Asian Games in the women's individual event (7th place) and the 2022 Asian Games in the women's individual event (5th place) and the women's team event (4th place).
