= Daniel Esposito =

Australian modern pentathlete

Personal information
- Nationality: Australian
- Born: 25 November 1963 (age 62)

Sport
- Sport: Modern pentathlon

Daniel Esposito (born 25 November 1963) is an Australian modern pentathlete. He competed at the modern pentathlon event 1984 Summer Olympics. Shortly before the Summer Olympics in Seoul in 1988, he was injured and then didn't compete.

He is the father and coach of Chloe Esposito, who won gold in the women's modern pentathlon at the 2016 Summer Olympics, and Max Esposito, who finished seventh in the men's modern pentathlon at the 2016 Summer Olympics. His daughter Emily is an air pistol shooter.
