= Max Esposito =

Australian modern pentathlete

Personal information
- Nicknames: Maxibon, Maxi
- Born: 16 June 1997 (age 29) Camden, New South Wales, Australia
- Height: 174 cm (5 ft 9 in)
- Weight: 64 kg (141 lb)

Sport
- Country: Australia
- Sport: Modern pentathlon
- Club: NSW Modern Pentathlon
- Coached by: Daniel Esposito

Max Esposito in Modern Pentathlon at Rio Olympic Games

Max Esposito (born 16 June 1997) is an Australian modern pentathlete. He competed at the 2016 Summer Olympics in the men's event. He was the youngest athlete in the race and finished seventh. Esposito has also competed in one Youth Olympic Games and one World Modern Pentathlon Championships.

== Early life ==
Max Esposito is the son of Daniel Esposito, who competed at the 1984 Summer Olympics in the modern pentathlon. His sister Chloe Esposito won a gold medal in the women's modern pentathlon at the 2016 Summer Olympics and another sister, Emily, is a sports shooter who competed at the 2010 Youth Olympics and 2014 Commonwealth Games. Esposito was born in Camden, a town south-west of Sydney. He now lives in the German capital, Berlin. Esposito took up the sport of modern pentathlon at the age of 13.

== Competition ==
Esposito's first international competition was in 2013 when he competed at the Oceanian Championships in Kazakhstan. He finished in first place and that result, along with another win at the 2014 International Youth A Championships, qualified him for the 2014 Summer Youth Olympics. Esposito finished 17th in the individual boys event and 12th in the mixed relay event. In October 2014 Esposito competed at the 2014 Union Internationale de Pentathlon Moderne International Youth Championships in Tata, Hungary. He finished fifth in the individual event.

On 30 May 2015 in Beijing, China, the Asia/Oceania Championships were held. The event doubled as qualification for the 2016 Summer Olympics in Rio de Janeiro, Brazil. Esposito won the event and he and his sister Chloe, who won the women's event, became the first Australian athletes to qualify for the 2016 Games. He then competed in the 2015 World Modern Pentathlon Championships in the men's individual event, finishing 47th.

Esposito's next major competition was the 2016 Olympics. Coming into the final discipline, the run and shooting combined, he was ranked 17th and conceded a 45 second handicap to the lead athlete. Esposito competed the combined course in the fourth quickest time out of all the athletes and climbed ten places to finish seventh. His total points score was 1462. After the Olympics, Esposito competed in the Union Internationale de Pentathlon Moderne Junior World Championships in Cairo, Egypt. Esposito finished ninth with a score of 1388 points. He finished 41 points behind Guatemalan Charles Fernandez.
