= Modern pentathlon at the 2018 Asian Games – Women's individual =

Modern pentathlon event

Women's individual at the 2018 Asian Games
- Venue: APM Equestrian Center
- Date: 31 August 2018
- Competitors: 13 from 7 nations

Medalists
gold medal	Zhang Mingyu	China
silver medal	Kim Se-hee	South Korea
bronze medal	Kim Sun-woo	South Korea

The women's individual modern pentathlon competition at the 2018 Asian Games in Jakarta was held on 31 August 2018.

== Schedule ==
All times are Western Indonesia Time (UTC+07:00)

Date	Time	Event
Friday, 31 August 2018	11:00	Swimming
Friday, 31 August 2018	12:15	Fencing
Friday, 31 August 2018	15:30	Riding
Friday, 31 August 2018	16:45	Laser-run

== Results ==
Legend

- DNS — Did not start
- EL — Eliminated

=== Swimming ===
Rank	Athlete	Time	Pen.	Points
1	Bian Yufei (CHN)	2:09.51		291
2	Rena Shimazu (JPN)	2:09.95		291
3	Zhang Mingyu (CHN)	2:10.30		290
4	Natsumi Tomonaga (JPN)	2:11.99		287
5	Yelena Potapenko (KAZ)	2:12.34		286
6	Kim Se-hee (KOR)	2:12.54		285
7	Kim Sun-woo (KOR)	2:12.55		285
8	Sanruthai Aransiri (THA)	2:12.62		285
9	Dea Putri (INA)	2:12.91		285
10	Adrianida Saleh (INA)	2:21.39		268
11	Mariia Shtukina (KGZ)	2:29.48		252
12	Ardak Akhidullayeva (KAZ)	2:35.27		240
13	Tirada Prasongpol (THA)	2:44.46		222

=== Fencing ===
Rank	Athlete	Won	Lost	Pen.	Bonus	Points
1	Zhang Mingyu (CHN)	20	4			274
2	Kim Sun-woo (KOR)	16	8		2	244
3	Ardak Akhidullayeva (KAZ)	15	9		2	236
4	Kim Se-hee (KOR)	15	9			234
5	Natsumi Tomonaga (JPN)	14	10			226
6	Mariia Shtukina (KGZ)	13	11			218
7	Yelena Potapenko (KAZ)	12	12		3	213
7	Tirada Prasongpol (THA)	11	13		1	203
9	Bian Yufei (CHN)	10	14			194
10	Sanruthai Aransiri (THA)	9	15			186
11	Rena Shimazu (JPN)	8	16		3	181
12	Adrianida Saleh (INA)	7	17		1	171
13	Dea Putri (INA)	6	18			162

=== Riding ===
Rank	Athlete	Horse	Time	Penalties			Points
Rank	Athlete	Horse	Time	Jump	Time	Other	Points
1	Mariia Shtukina (KGZ)	Lady Dance	59.26				300
2	Zhang Mingyu (CHN)	Joker	56.79				300
3	Rena Shimazu (JPN)	Primer Caballo	1:08.30		7		293
4	Kim Se-hee (KOR)	Louser	1:01.20	14			286
5	Kim Sun-woo (KOR)	Ciliano	1:07.62	14	6		280
6	Yelena Potapenko (KAZ)	Lisa	1:30.55	27	29		244
7	Natsumi Tomonaga (JPN)	Tulis	1:33.81	34	32		234
8	Bian Yufei (CHN)	Jayantara	1:41.03	51	40		209
9	Ardak Akhidullayeva (KAZ)	Laura Dante	EL				0
10	Adrianida Saleh (INA)	Smart	DNS				0
10	Tirada Prasongpol (THA)	Bentley	DNS				0
10	Dea Putri (INA)	Autumn	DNS				0
10	Sanruthai Aransiri (THA)	Burning	DNS				0

=== Laser-run ===
Rank	Athlete	Time	Pen.	Points
1	Kim Se-hee (KOR)	12:35.00		545
2	Ardak Akhidullayeva (KAZ)	12:37.11		543
3	Kim Sun-woo (KOR)	12:41.75		539
4	Bian Yufei (CHN)	12:46.28		534
5	Natsumi Tomonaga (JPN)	12:55.54		525
6	Rena Shimazu (JPN)	13:02.90		518
7	Zhang Mingyu (CHN)	13:09.26		511
8	Yelena Potapenko (KAZ)	13:54.63		466
9	Dea Putri (INA)	14:38.11		422
10	Mariia Shtukina (KGZ)	16:04.77		336
11	Adrianida Saleh (INA)	16:06.92		334
12	Sanruthai Aransiri (THA)	16:14.40		326
13	Tirada Prasongpol (THA)	16:53.50		287

=== Summary ===
Rank	Athlete	Swim	Fence	Ride	L-run	Total	Time
1st place, gold medalist(s)	Zhang Mingyu (CHN)	290	274	300	511	1375	
2nd place, silver medalist(s)	Kim Se-hee (KOR)	285	234	286	545	1350	+0:25
3rd place, bronze medalist(s)	Kim Sun-woo (KOR)	285	244	280	539	1348	+0:27
4	Rena Shimazu (JPN)	291	181	293	518	1283	+1:32
5	Natsumi Tomonaga (JPN)	287	226	234	525	1272	+1:43
6	Bian Yufei (CHN)	291	194	209	534	1228	+2:27
7	Yelena Potapenko (KAZ)	286	213	244	466	1209	+2:46
8	Mariia Shtukina (KGZ)	252	218	300	336	1106	+4:29
9	Ardak Akhidullayeva (KAZ)	240	236	0	543	1019	+5:56
10	Dea Putri (INA)	285	162	0	422	869	+8:26
11	Sanruthai Aransiri (THA)	285	186	0	326	797	+9:38
12	Adrianida Saleh (INA)	268	171	0	334	773	+10:02
13	Tirada Prasongpol (THA)	222	203	0	287	712	+11:03
