= Modern pentathlon at the 2022 Asian Games – Women's team =

Modern pentathlon event

Women's team at the 2022 Asian Games
- Venue: Fuyang Yinhu Sports Centre
- Date: 20–24 September 2023
- Competitors: 15 from 4 nations

Medalists
gold medal	China; Bian Yufei, Zhang Mingyu, Zhong Xiuting
silver medal	Japan; Hana Shibata, Misaki Uchida, Kanae Umemura
bronze medal	South Korea; Kim Se-hee, Kim Sun-woo, Seong Seung-min

The women's team modern pentathlon competition at the 2022 Asian Games in Hangzhou was held from 20 to 24 September 2023.

== Schedule ==
All times are China Standard Time (UTC+08:00)

Date	Time	Event
Wednesday, 20 September 2023	10:00	Fencing ranking round
Sunday, 24 September 2023	10:00	Riding
Sunday, 24 September 2023	10:50	Fencing bonus round
Sunday, 24 September 2023	11:20	Swimming
Sunday, 24 September 2023	12:00	Laser-run

== Results ==
Rank	Team	Ride	Fence	Swim	L-run	Total
1st place, gold medalist(s)	China (CHN)	900	728	837	1629	4094
	Bian Yufei	300	269	284	521	1374
	Xie Linzhi	~~292~~	~~239~~	~~279~~	~~456~~	~~1266~~
	Zhang Mingyu	300	242	281	583	1406
	Zhong Xiuting	300	217	272	525	1314
2nd place, silver medalist(s)	Japan (JPN)	582	629	861	1633	3705
	Hana Shibata	0	185	290	540	1015
	Misaki Uchida	286	222	295	551	1354
	Kanae Umemura	296	222	276	542	1336
3rd place, bronze medalist(s)	South Korea (KOR)	299	730	839	1706	3574
	Jang Ha-eun	~~0~~	~~200~~	~~265~~	~~598~~	~~1063~~
	Kim Se-hee	0	240	277	583	1100
	Kim Sun-woo	299	255	283	549	1386
	Seong Seung-min	0	235	279	574	1088
4	Kazakhstan (KAZ)	569	663	818	1458	3508
	Anastassiya Kochetkova	0	242	277	414	933
	Yelena Potapenko	300	217	274	549	1340
	Kristina Ryabova	~~0~~	~~165~~	~~236~~	~~445~~	~~846~~
	Lyudmila Yakovleva	269	204	267	495	1235
