= Marcela Cuaspud =

Ecuadorian modern pentathlete

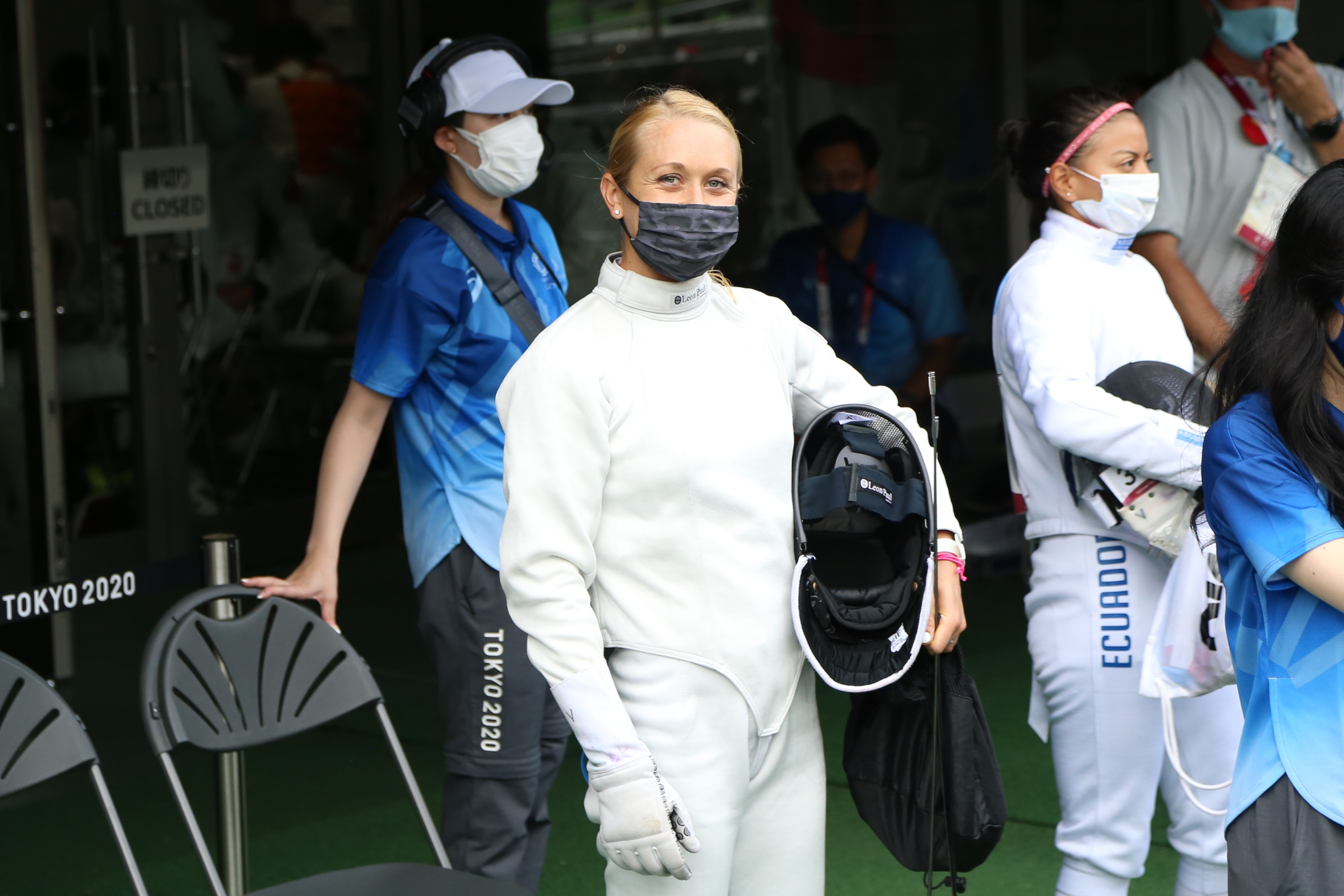
- Marcela Cuaspud on the right

Personal information
- Born: 28 April 1995 (age 29); Quito, Ecuador

Sport
- Sport: Modern pentathlon

Marcela Cuaspud (born 28 April 1995) is an Ecuadorian modern pentathlete. She competed in the women's event at the 2020 Summer Olympics.
