= Zhong Xiuting =

Chinese modern pentathlete

Personal information
- Born: 15 September 1999 (age 26) Xinhui, Guangdong, China

Sport
- Country: China
- Sport: Modern pentathlon
Medal record
Women's modern pentathlon
Representing China
Summer Youth Olympics
Gold medal – first place	2014 Nanjing	Girls' individual
Asian Games
Gold medal – first place	2022 Hangzhou	Tram

Zhong Xiuting (Chinese: 钟秀婷; pinyin: Zhōng Xiùtíng; Jyutping: Zung1 Sau3-ting4; born 15 September 1999) is a Chinese modern pentathlete. She won the gold medal in the women's team event at the 2022 Asian Games held in Hangzhou, China.

== Early life ==
Born in 1999 in Xinhui, Guangdong, Zhong initially trained for swimming and was selected into provincial team before her coach switched her to train in modern pentathlon in 2010.

== Sports career ==
Zhong made her debut in modern pentathlon at the 2014 Summer Youth Olympics in Nanjing, China during which she won gold medal in the individual event. At the 2015 UIPM Junior World Championships in Mexico City, she and Li Shuhan won the first place in mixed team relay.

At the 2018 UIPM Pentathlon Junior World Championships in Czech Republic, she and Gu Yewen won silver medals. In December 2018, she represented Guangdong at the 2018 National Modern Pentathlon Championships in Guangzhou, China and won bronze medal.

On 24 October 2019, at the 7th CISM Military World Games in Wuhan, China, Zhong along with Wang Shiqi won gold medal in the pentathlon team competition. In November 2019, at the 2019 Modern Pentathlon Asian Championships and 2020 Summer Olympics Asia and Oceania Qualifying Adult Mixed Relay held in Wuhan, she and Zhang Yu won the championship with a total score of 1448 points.

In 2022, at the Modern Pentathlon Asian Championships in Almaty, Kazakhstan, the Chinese team consisting of Zhong won the silver medal in women's team event with 3973 points. On 19 June 2023, at the 2023 National Modern Pentathlon Championships in Hangzhou, China, she won gold medal in the individual event with a total score of 1355 points.

In September 2023, at the 19th Asian Games in Hangzhou, China, she along with Zhang Mingyu and Bian Yufei won gold medal in women's team event with a total of 4094 points.
