= Chloe Esposito =

Australian modern pentathlete

Personal information
- Born: 19 September 1991 (age 35) Sydney, New South Wales, Australia
- Height: 168 cm (5 ft 6 in)
- Weight: 55 kg (121 lb)

Sport
- Country: Australia
- Sport: Modern pentathlon
Medal record
Women's modern pentathlon
Representing Australia
Olympic Games
Gold medal – first place	2016 Rio de Janeiro	Individual

Chloe Esposito OAM (born 19 September 1991) is an Australian shooter and modern pentathlon competitor. She competed at the 2008 Commonwealth Youth Games in the 10 m air pistol. She represented Australia at the 2012 Summer Olympics, London, in the modern pentathlon and won the gold medal in the same event at the 2016 Summer Olympics, Rio de Janeiro.

== Personal life ==
Esposito was born on 19 September 1991 in Camden, New South Wales. She is from and lives in the Sydney area. She attended St Francis Xavier (NSW, Australia) before going to Mount Saint Joseph for high school. She competed at the 2008 Commonwealth Youth Games in the 10 m air pistol. During June 2012, she visited Palmerston District Primary School, where she discussed the five sports of the modern pentathlon, swimming, running, shooting, fencing and horse riding, with students.

Her father is Daniel Esposito, an Olympic competitor in the modern pentathlon at the 1984 Summer Olympics. Her brother, Max Esposito also competed in the modern pentathlon at the 2016 Summer Olympics. Her sister, Emily Esposito, represented Australia in pistol shooting at the 2010 Singapore Youth Olympics.

Esposito is 166 centimetres (65 in) tall and weighs 55 kilograms (121 lb).

In January 2020, Esposito announced that she was expecting her first child. This means she would not have been able to defend her pentathlon gold Medal at the 2020 Tokyo Olympics. However, the delay of the Games to 2021 due to the COVID-19 pandemic meant that she could have had the opportunity to participate. She decided not to, allowing Marina Carrier to take her place.

== Modern pentathlon ==
Esposito is a modern pentathlon competitor. She tried to make the Australian modern pentathlon team for the 2008 Summer Olympics, the youngest Australian woman ever to try, by competing at the Oceania Championships. At World Cup events early in 2012, she finished third and fifth overall. In May 2012, she finished eighth in the final World Cup event in China.

Esposito was selected to represent Australia at the 2012 Summer Olympics in the modern pentathlon. She set a goal of trying to medal in the sport as Australia had not medalled in the sport going into the 2012 Games. Going into the 2012 Olympic Games, she was ranked eleventh in the world, improving from a rank of thirteen a month earlier. She earned her Olympic spot after she finished as the top ranking competitor from Oceania in the 2012 Asia/Oceania Championship. Esposito finished 7th at the 2012 Summer Olympics, making her the first Australian modern pentathlete to finish in the top 10 at the Olympics since 1964.

Esposito also represented Australia at the 2016 Summer Olympics. Coming into the final event (running and shooting combined), she was 7th and overcame a 45-second handicap to win the gold medal, setting a new Olympic record of 1372 points.

== Recognition ==
- 2016 - ABC Sports Personality of the Year at the Australian Institute of Sport Performance Awards
- 2017 - Order of Australia Medal
