= Jo Muir =

British modern pentathlete

Personal information
- Full name: Joanna Muir
- Born: 30 August 1994 (age 31) Haugh of Urr, Scotland
- Education: University of Bath
- Years active: 2015–2023

Sport
- Sport: Modern pentathlon
- University team: Bath
- Turned pro: 2015

Achievements and titles
- Olympic finals: 2020
- World finals: 2016
- Regional finals: 2019
Medal record
Representing Great Britain
Junior European Modern Pentathlon Championships
Silver medal – second place	2015 Sofia	Women's relay
World Modern Pentathlon Championships
Silver medal – second place	2016 Moscow	Women's relay
European Modern Pentathlon Championships
Gold medal – first place	2019 Bath	Team
Gold medal – first place	2022 Székesfehérvár	Team
Silver medal – second place	2022 Székesfehérvár	Individual

Joanna Muir (born 30 August 1994) is a British former modern pentathlete, who was part of the British squad that won the team event at the 2019 European Modern Pentathlon Championships, and came second in the women's relay event at the 2016 World Modern Pentathlon Championships. She came second at the opening event of the 2021 Modern Pentathlon World Cup. Muir competed in the modern pentathlon event at the delayed 2020 Summer Olympics.

== Career ==
Muir was formerly a runner. She took up modern pentathlon at the age of 15, having also been involved in tetrathlon. After finishing her studying, she chose to become a full-time athlete. She trained at the University of Bath.

In 2013, Muir made her debut in the Modern Pentathlon World Cup at an event in Palm Springs, California, US. In 2015, Muir and Francesca Summers came second in the women's relay event at the Junior European Modern Pentathlon Championships. In 2016, Muir and Samantha Murray finished second in the women's relay event at the 2016 World Modern Pentathlon Championships. Later in the year, she finished fifth at the 2016 European Modern Pentathlon Championships in Sofia, Bulgaria. It was her first senior European Championship, and she was highest ranked British finisher. Muir came 16th at the 2018 World Modern Pentathlon Championships. The same year, she won a 5 miles (8.0 km) running road race in Gelston, Dumfries and Galloway.

In January 2019, Muir won the Budapest Indoor International event. In August 2019, Muir came fourth in the individual event at the 2019 European Modern Pentathlon Championships, and won the team event alongside Kate French and Francesca Summers. In January 2020, Muir won the Budapest Indoor International event again. In February, she won the opening event of the Modern Pentathlon World Cup in Cairo.

In March 2021, Muir came second in the opening event of the season's Modern Pentathlon World Cup in Budapest, finishing behind fellow Briton Kate French. She finished fourth in the second and third events of the World Cup, and finished sixth in the competition's final in May 2021. Muir was unable to compete in the 2021 World Modern Pentathlon Championships, as all British athletes were withdrawn from the event, due to the UK Government's COVID-19 restrictions on travel to Egypt. The World Championships were the last qualifying event prior to selection for the delayed 2020 Summer Olympics. In June 2021, Muir qualified for the modern pentathlon event at the 2020 Olympics based on her world ranking. At the time of her qualification, she was ranked sixth in the world, and she was the only Olympic debutant in the British pentathlon squad. At the Games, Muir finished 14th; she finished 33rd in the first fencing section, improved to 15th after the swimming event, before being demoted to 31st after the second fencing tournament. She was 21st after the equestrian event.

At the 2022 European Modern Pentathlon Championships, Muir came second in the individual event and was part of the British team that won the event.

In January 2023, Muir announced her retirement from the sport.

== Personal life ==
Muir is from Haugh of Urr, Scotland. She attended Castle Douglas High School. and later studied Sports Performance at the University of Bath, graduating in 2015. Following her retirement from modern pentathlon, Muir started working for a sports marketing agency.
