= Alise Fakhrutdinova =

Uzbekistani modern pentathlete (born 1990)

Personal information
- Nationality: Uzbekistani
- Born: 23 February 1990 (age 36) Moscow, Russia

Sport
- Sport: Modern pentathlon

Alise Naylevna Fakhrutdinova (born 23 February 1990) is an Uzbekistani modern pentathlete. She competed in the women's event at the 2020 Summer Olympics. Fakhrutdinova is from Tatar descent.
