= Oktawia Nowacka =

Polish modern pentathlete (born 1991)

Kapral Oktawia Nowacka
Personal information
- Nationality: Polish
- Born: 2 January 1991 (age 35) Starogard Gdański, Poland
- Height: 1.80 m (5 ft 11 in)
Medal record
Women's modern pentathlon
Representing Poland
Event	1st	2nd	3rd
Olympic Games	0	0	1
World Championships	1	0	2
European Championships	0	2	1
Total	1	2	4
Olympic Games
Bronze medal – third place	2016 Rio de Janeiro	Individual
World Championships
Gold medal – first place	2015 Berlin	Team
Bronze medal – third place	2014 Warsaw	Mixed relay
Bronze medal – third place	2015 Berlin	Relay
European Championships
Silver medal – second place	2013 Drzonków	Relay
Silver medal – second place	2022 Székesfehérvár	Relay
Bronze medal – third place	2014 Székesfehérvár	Mixed relay
- Military career
- Allegiance: Poland
- Branch: Polish Land Forces
- Rank: Corporal
- Unit: Central Military Sports Team
- Website: oktawianowacka.pl

Oktawia Maria Nowacka ([ɔkˈtavʲa nɔˈvat͡ska]; born 2 January 1991) is a Polish modern pentathlete. She is the 2016 Olympic bronze medalist. Nowacka won the gold medal in the team event at the 2015 World Modern Pentathlon Championships. She has been a vegan since 2013.
