= Deodoro Aquatics Centre =

Swimming venue in Deodoro, Rio de Janeiro, Brazil

Coordinates: 22.8618°S 43.4036°W

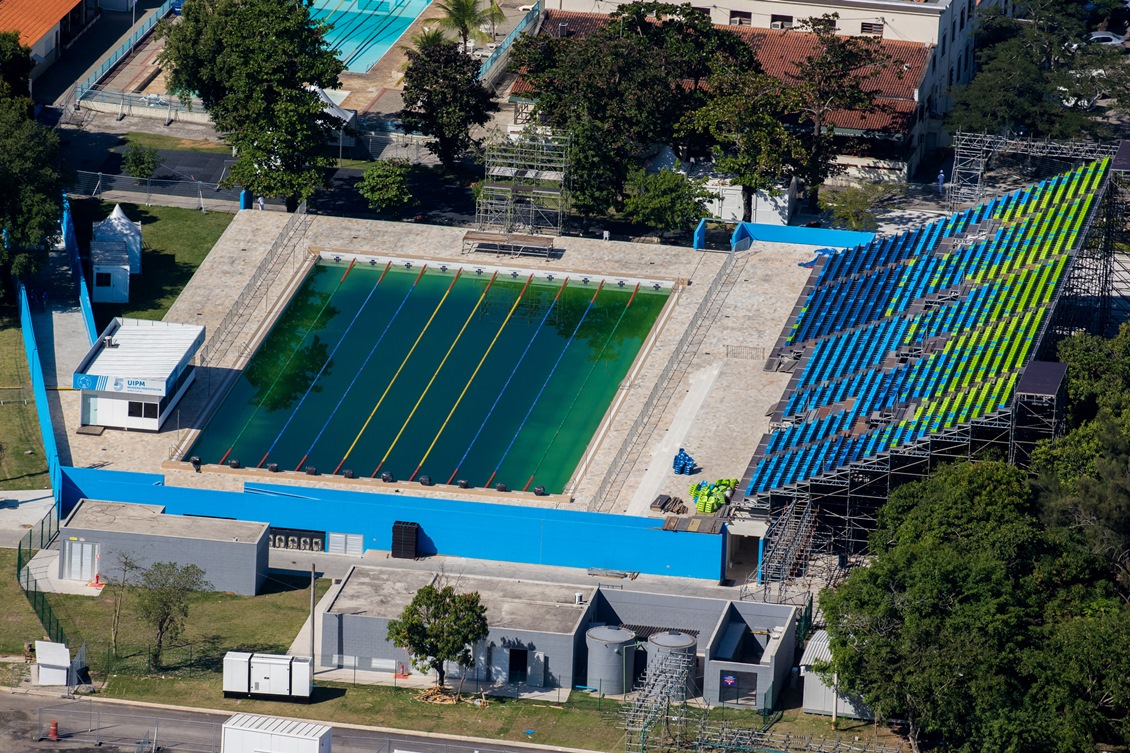
- Interactive map of Deodoro Aquatics Centre
- Address: Rio de Janeiro; Brazil
- Location: Deodoro

Tenant
- 2016 Summer Olympics

The Deodoro Aquatics Centre is a swimming venue in Deodoro, Rio de Janeiro, Brazil, that hosted the swimming events in the modern pentathlon at the 2016 Summer Olympics. It was first built for the 2007 Pan American Games and received renovations to host Olympic events. The site is now closed.
