= Kim Se-hee =

South Korean modern pentathlete

Personal information
- Born: 28 November 1995 (age 30)

Sport
- Country: South Korea
- Sport: Modern pentathlon
Medal record
Women's modern pentathlon
Representing South Korea
Asian Games
Silver medal – second place	2018 Jakarta	Individual
Bronze medal – third place	2022 Hangzhou	Team
World Championships
Gold medal – first place	2021 Cairo	Mixed
Bronze medal – third place	2022 Alexandria	Relay
Asian Championships
Gold medal – first place	2019 Wuhan	Individual

Kim Se-hee (born 28 November 1995) is a two-time gold medal-winning Modern Pentathlete from South Korea.

A keen swimmer in her youth, Kim Se-hee's running skills gained her coach's attention during high school and she was later encouraged to try her hand at Modern Pentathlon. Initially attracted by the opportunity to learn 5 sports, she soon excelled, achieving a silver medal at the 2018 Asian Games and a gold medal at the same event the following year.

2021 saw the athlete win yet another gold medal alongside Changwan Seo in the Mixed Relay race at the 2021 Pentathlon and Laser Run World Championship held in Cairo, Egypt. This victory helped secure her place on the world's stage, representing Korea at the 2020 Tokyo Olympic Games .

After the race in Cairo, Se-hee declared: "I am very happy to have won a gold medal at the World Championships, the last game before the Olympics, and I will do my best to achieve good results at the Tokyo Olympics."

Speaking about her athletic ambitions, she said: "At first, to be remembered as a hard worker was my goal. But now I want to be a historical Modern Pentathlete."
