= Zhang Mingyu =

Chinese modern pentathlete

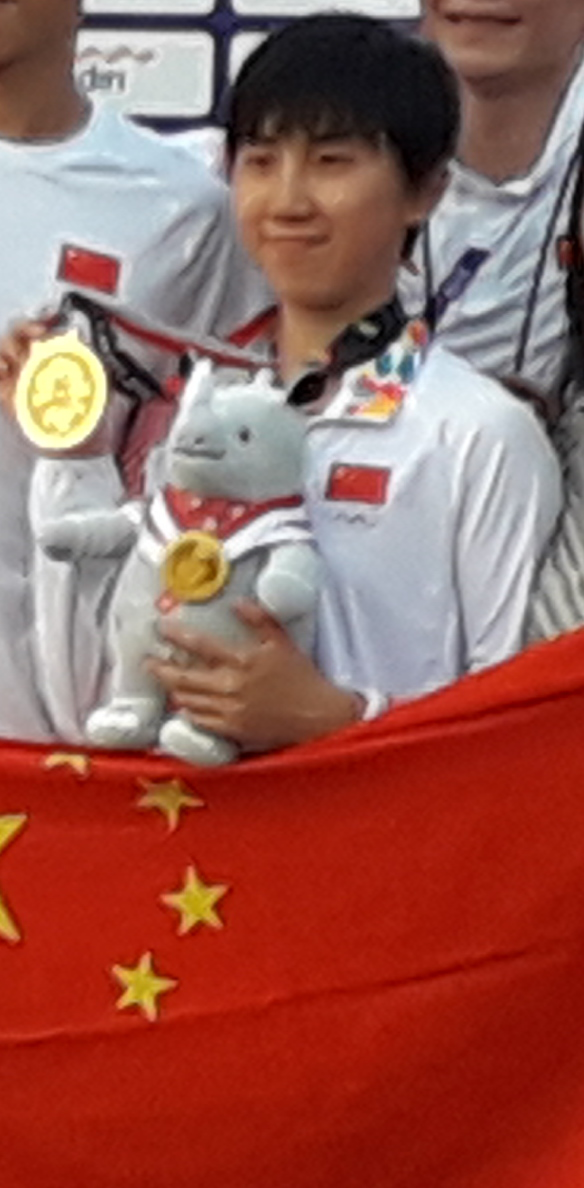
- Zhang Mingyu in 2018

Personal information
- Born: 3 October 2001 (age 24)

Sport
- Country: China
- Sport: Modern pentathlon
Medal record
Women's modern pentathlon
Representing China
Asian Games
Gold medal – first place	2018 Jakarta	Individual
Gold medal – first place	2022 Hangzhou	Individual
Gold medal – first place	2022 Hangzhou	Team

Zhang Mingyu (simplified Chinese: 张明煜; traditional Chinese: 張明煜; pinyin: Zhāng Míngyù; born 3 October 2001) is a Chinese modern pentathlete. She won the gold medal in the women's individual event at the 2018 Asian Games held in Jakarta, Indonesia.
