= Donata Rimšaitė =

Russian-Lithuanian modern pentathlete

Personal information
- Born: 29 January 1988 (age 38) Vilnius, Lithuanian SSR, Soviet Union

Sport
- Sport: Modern pentathlon
Medal record
Women's Modern Pentathlon
Representing Lithuania
World Championships
Silver medal – second place	2010 Chengdu	Individual
Representing Russia
World Championships
Gold medal – first place	2016 Moscow	Mixed relay
Bronze medal – third place	2013 Kaoshiung	Individual
Bronze medal – third place	2013 Kaoshiung	Relay
- Updated on 2 September 2013

Donata Rimšaitė (Russian: Доната Римшайте; born 29 January 1988) is a Russian-Lithuanian modern pentathlete. She represented Lithuania at the 2008 Summer Olympics in Beijing. She won a silver medal at the 2010 Modern Pentathlon World Cup in Medway. In 2011, Rimšaitė began competing for Russia. She won a gold medal in the mixed relay at the 2016 World Championships in Moscow.

== Awards ==
- Knight's Cross Order for Merits to Lithuania (22 September 2010)
- Best Russian women's modern pentathlist (2013)
