= Barbora Kodedová =

Czech modern pentathlete

Personal information
- Nationality: Czech
- Born: 27 February 1990 (age 35); Plzeň, Czechoslovakia
- Height: 165 cm (5 ft 5 in)
- Weight: 53 kg (117 lb)

Sport
- Country: Czech Republic
- Sport: Modern pentathlon

Barbora Kodedová (born 27 February 1990) is a Czech modern pentathlete. She has qualified for 2016 Summer Olympics. She is coached by Libor Capalini, Jan Miňo, Robert Kopecký.
