= 2016 World Modern Pentathlon Championships =

International sports competition

2016 World Championships
- Location: Moscow, Russia
- Dates: 23–29 May

The 2016 UIPM Senior World Championships were held in Moscow, Russia from 23 to 29 May 2016. The event includes pistol shooting, fencing, 200m swimming, show jumping and a 3km run.

== Medal summary ==
=== Men ===
| Event | Gold | | Silver | | Bronze | |
|---|---|---|---|---|---|---|
| Individual | Valentin Belaud; France | 1514 pts | Aleksander Lesun; Russia | 1510 pts | Jung Jin-hwa; South Korea | 1504 pts |
| Team^{[a]} | Egypt; Amro El Geziry; Yasser Hefny; Omar El Geziry | 4477 pts | France; Valentin Prades; Valentin Belaud; Christopher Patte | 4106 pts | South Korea; Jun Woong-tae; Jung Jin-hwa; Lee Woo-jin | 4100 pts |
| Relay | South Korea; Hwang Woo-jin; Jun Woong-tae | 1563 pts | Russia; Ilia Frolov; Oleg Naumov | 1550 pts | France; Alexandre Henrard; Pierre Dejardin | 1524 pts |

- ^{Men's team} Russian team originally won silver medals but was disqualified due to anti-doping rules violation by Maksim Kustov.

=== Women ===
| Event | Gold | | Silver | | Bronze | |
|---|---|---|---|---|---|---|
| Individual | Sarolta Kovács; Hungary | 1386 pts | Élodie Clouvel; France | 1374 pts | Lena Schöneborn; Germany | 1373 pts |
| Team | Hungary; Tamara Alekszejev; Zsófia Földházi; Sarolta Kovács | 4080 pts | China; Zhang Xiaonan; Liang Wanxia; Chen Qian | 4075 pts | Germany; Janine Kohlmann; Annika Schleu; Lena Schöneborn | 4042 pts |
| Relay | Germany; Annika Schleu; Lena Schöneborn | 1419 pts | Great Britain; Joanna Muir; Samantha Murray | 1409 pts | Belarus; Katsiaryna Arol; Iryna Prasiantsova | 1405 pts |

=== Mixed ===
| Event | Gold | | Silver | | Bronze | |
|---|---|---|---|---|---|---|
| Relay | Russia; Aleksander Lesun; Donata Rimšaitė | 1509 pts | China; Han Jiahao; Zhang Xiaonan | 1488 pts | Belarus; Ilya Palazkov; Anastasiya Prokopenko | 1474 pts |

== Medal table ==
* Host nation (Russia)

| Rank | Nation | Gold | Silver | Bronze | Total |
|---|---|---|---|---|---|
| 1 | Hungary (HUN) | 2 | 0 | 0 | 2 |
| 2 | France (FRA) | 1 | 2 | 1 | 4 |
| 3 | Russia (RUS)* | 1 | 2 | 0 | 3 |
| 4 | Germany (GER) | 1 | 0 | 2 | 3 |
| 4 | South Korea (KOR) | 1 | 0 | 2 | 3 |
| 6 | Egypt (EGY) | 1 | 0 | 0 | 1 |
| 7 | China (CHN) | 0 | 2 | 0 | 2 |
| 8 | Great Britain (GBR) | 0 | 1 | 0 | 1 |
| 9 | Belarus (BLR) | 0 | 0 | 2 | 2 |
| Totals (9 entries) | | 7 | 7 | 7 | 21 |

== See also ==
- Union Internationale de Pentathlon Moderne (UIPM)
