= Shino Yamanaka =

Japanese modern pentathlete (born 1990)

Shino Yamanaka (山中 詩乃, Yamanaka Shino; born 3 August 1990 in Kochi Prefecture) is a Japanese modern pentathlete. At the 2012 Summer Olympics, she competed in the women's competition, finishing in 30th place.
