= Rena Shimazu =

Japanese modern pentathlete

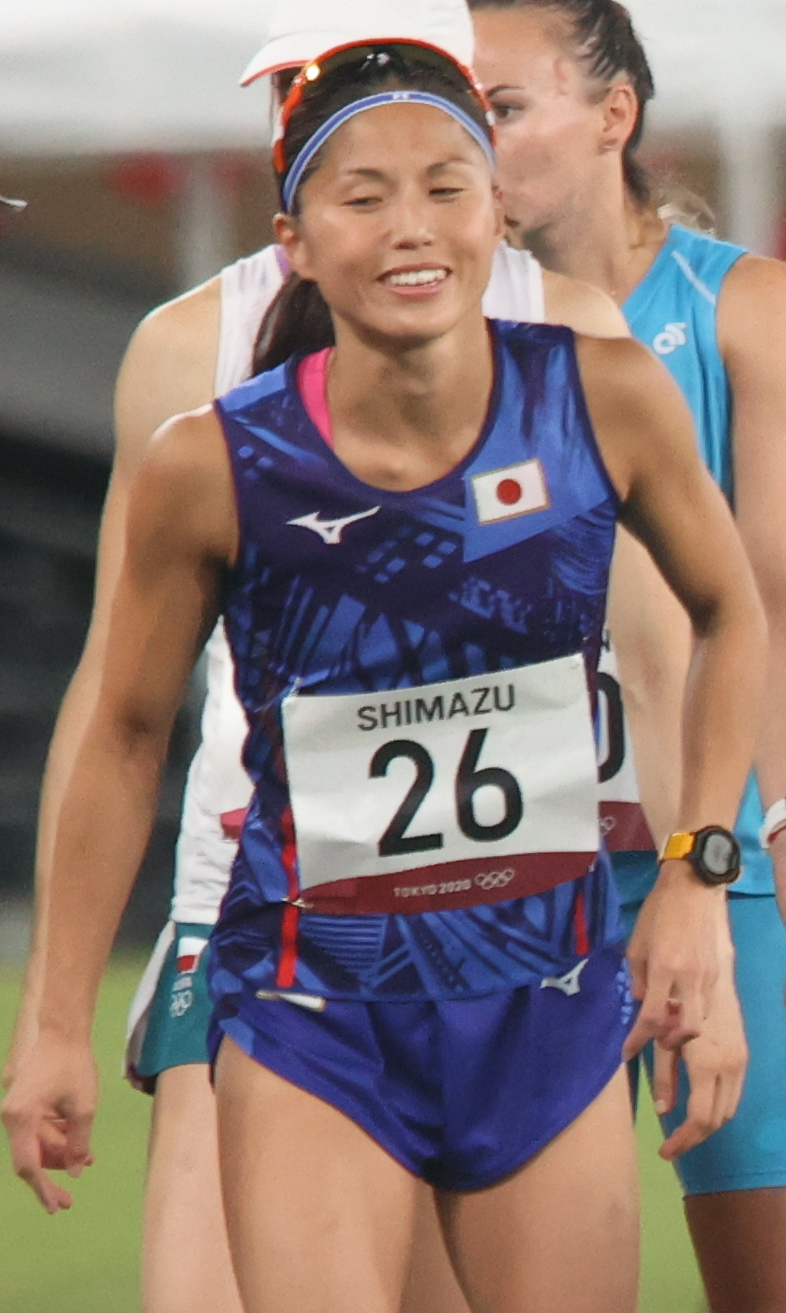
- Shimazu at the 2020 Summer Olympics

Personal information
- Nationality: Japanese
- Born: 28 May 1991 (age 34)

Sport
- Sport: Modern pentathlon

Rena Shimazu (島津玲奈, Shimazu Rena; born 28 May 1991) is a Japanese modern pentathlete. She competed in the women's event at the 2020 Summer Olympics.
