= Natsumi Tomonaga =

Japanese modern pentathlete

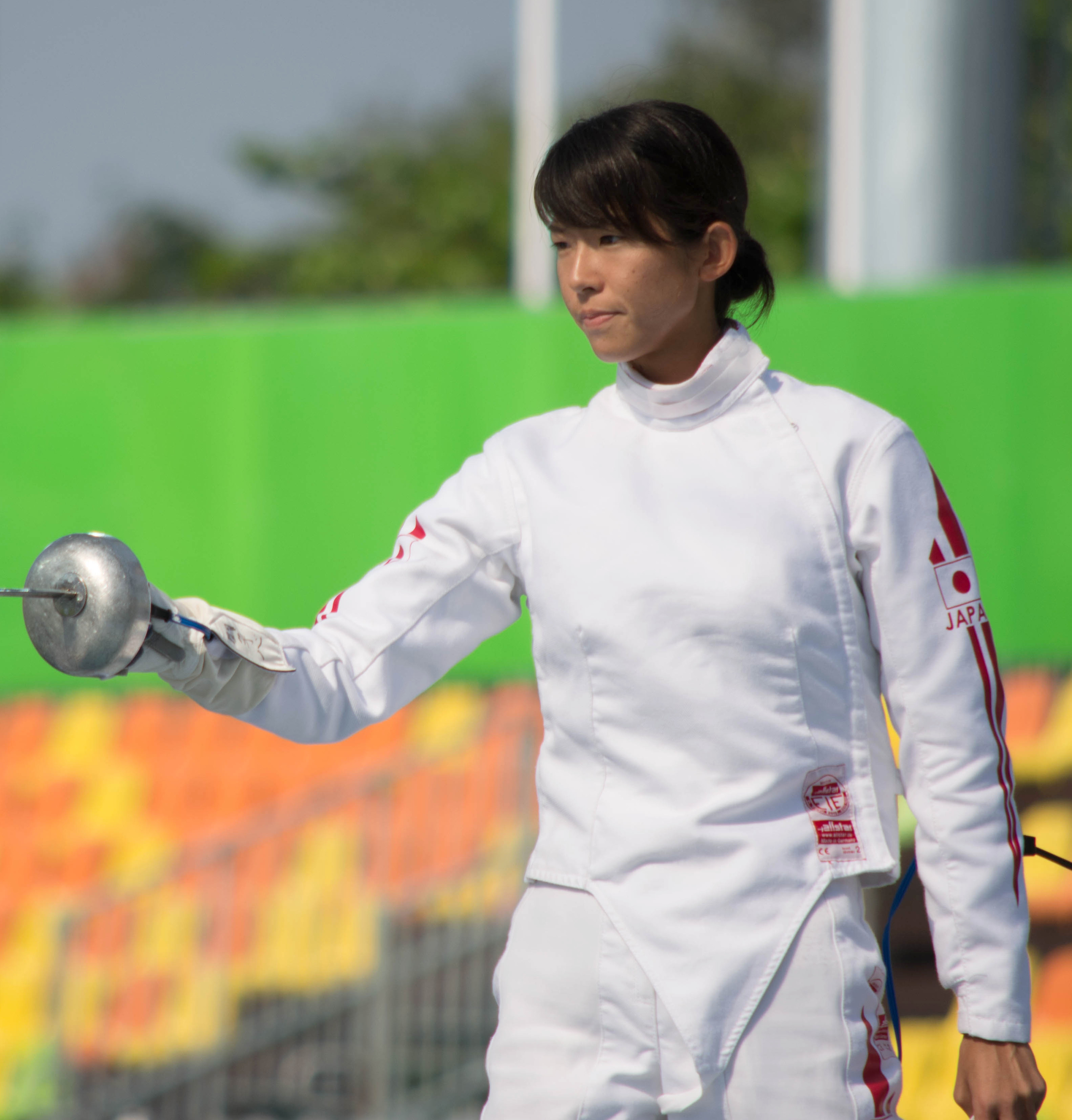
- Tomonaga at the 2016 Olympics

Personal information
- Nationality: Japanese
- Born: August 22, 1991 (age 33)
- Height: 169 cm (5 ft 7 in)
- Weight: 53 kg (117 lb)

Sport
- Country: Japan
- Sport: Modern pentathlon
- Club: Metropolitan Police Department
- Coached by: Shoji Kurousu (club); Hiroshi Miyagahara (national)

Natsumi Tomonaga (朝長 なつ美, Tomonaga Natsumi, born August 22, 1991) is a Japanese modern pentathlete.

== Early life ==
Natsumi Tomonaga was born on August 22, 1991, in Sayama City, Saitama Prefecture, Japan.

She studied at Kawagoe Minami High School.

After graduating from high school in 2011, Natsumi decided to follow in her parents' footsteps, who were both police officers, and joined the Metropolitan Police Academy.

== Career ==
Natsumi practiced both swimming and athletics and was a keen athlete, but it was after her breaking the academy's female record for running 1500 meters in 4 minutes and 55 seconds, that Natsumi was scouted for Modern Pentathlon and began training professionally in 2012. A mere two years, later, Natsumi won the 54th Modern Pentathlon All Japan Championship. The same year, 2014, she was selected as a member of the Japanese national team.

In 2016, with only four years of experience, Natsumi represented Japan at the 2016 Rio Olympics and ranked 13th in women's modern pentathlon, the third highest for a Japanese athlete. Shortly after the Olympics, Natsumi's rank was moved up from 13th to 12th due to the disqualification of a top player.

At the 2016 World Cup she placed 6th, and in 2017, she placed 4th, renewing the highest ranking for a Japanese athlete.

Natsumi continues to compete professionally, finishing 5th in the 2018 Asian Games organized in Jakarta-Palembang and second in the 2019 UIPM 2019 Asia/Oceania Championships.

In 2020, Natsumi qualified to represent Japan once again at the Tokyo Olympics 2020. The same year, on December 24, she married one of her colleagues, changing her last name from Tomonaga to Takamiya.
