= Yang Soo-jin =

South Korean modern pentathlete

- Born: 2 September 1988 (age 37); Chuncheon, Gangwon Province, South Korea
- Occupation: Pentathlete
- Height: 1.65 m (5 ft 5 in)

Korean name
- Hangul: 양수진
- RR: Yang Sujin
- MR: Yang Sujin

Yang Soo-jin (born 2 September 1988) is a South Korean pentathlete. At the 2012 Summer Olympics, she competed in the women's competition, and finished in 24th place with a total score of 4964.
