= Zhang Xiaonan =

Chinese modern pentathlete (born 1992)

Personal information
- Nationality: Chinese
- Born: 21 July 1992 (age 33)

Sport
- Country: China
- Sport: Modern pentathlon

Zhang Xiaonan (born 21 July 1992) is a Chinese modern pentathlete. She competed at the 2016 Summer Olympics and the 2020 Summer Olympics.
