= Kim Sun-woo (pentathlete) =

South Korean modern pentathlete

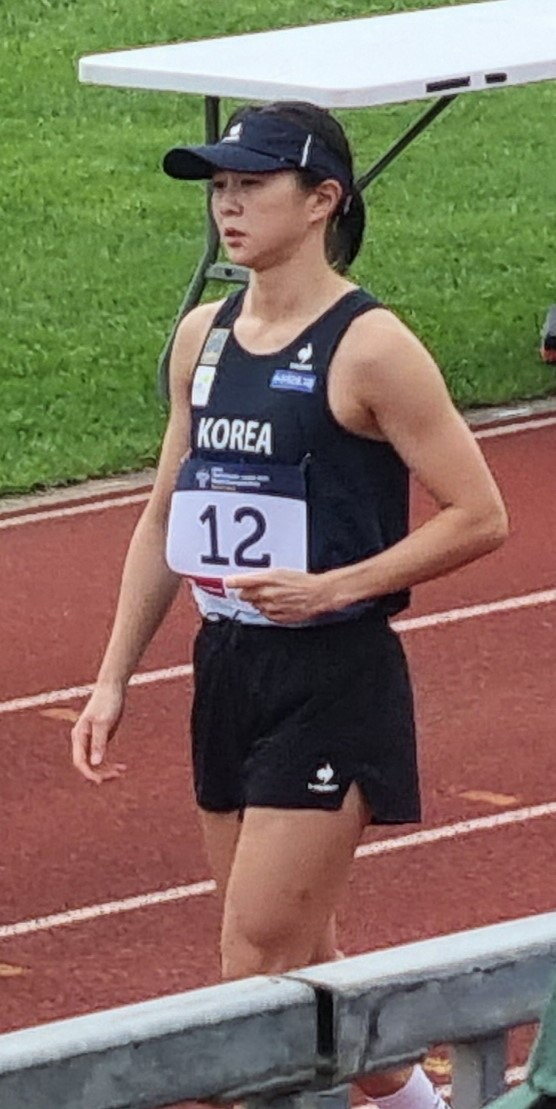
- At the 2023 World Championships

Personal information
- Nationality: South Korean
- Born: 6 October 1996 (age 29)
- Education: Korea National Sport University
- Height: 164 cm (5 ft 5 in)
- Weight: 59 kg (130 lb)

Sport
- Country: South Korea
- Sport: Modern pentathlon
Medal record
Women's modern pentathlon
Representing South Korea
World Championships
Gold medal – first place	2022 Alexandria	Mixed relay
Gold medal – first place	2024 Zhengzhou	Relay
Gold medal – first place	2024 Zhengzhou	Mixed relay
Silver medal – second place	2022 Alexandria	Team
Silver medal – second place	2023 Bath	Mixed relay
Silver medal – second place	2024 Zhengzhou	Team
Bronze medal – third place	2022 Alexandria	Relay
Asian Games
Gold medal – first place	2014 Incheon	Team
Silver medal – second place	2022 Hangzhou	Individual
Bronze medal – third place	2018 Jakarta	Individual
Bronze medal – third place	2022 Hangzhou	Team

Korean name
- Hangul: 김선우
- RR: Gim Seonu
- MR: Kim Sŏnu

Kim Sun-woo (born 6 October 1996) is a South Korean modern pentathlete. She has qualified for the 2016 Summer Olympics. She attended Gyeonggi Sports High School.
