= Modern pentathlon at the 2008 Summer Olympics =

Modern pentathlon at the Games of the XXIX Olympiad
- Venue: Olympic Sports Centre Stadium; Ying Tung Natatorium; Olympic Green Convention Center
- Dates: 21–22 August 2008

Modern pentathlon competitions at the 2008 Summer Olympics in Beijing were held on August 21 and August 22 at the Olympic Sports Centre Stadium (running, equestrian), Ying Tung Natatorium (swimming), and the Olympic Green Convention Center (fencing, shooting). Modern pentathlon contained five events; pistol shooting, épée fencing, 200 m freestyle swimming, show jumping, and a 3 km cross-country run.

Andrey Moiseev, representing Russia, became the second modern pentathlete to successfully defend an Olympic title in the men's event, while Lena Schöneborn of Germany won the women's.

== Medal summary ==
Event	Gold	Silver	Bronze
Men's	Andrey Moiseev; Russia	Edvinas Krungolcas; Lithuania	Andrejus Zadneprovskis; Lithuania
Women's^{[a]}	Lena Schöneborn; Germany	Heather Fell; Great Britain	Anastasiya Samusevich; Belarus

^{a} The original bronze medalist, Victoria Tereshchuk of Ukraine was disqualified for doping violations.

== Qualified athletes ==
=== Men ===
An NOC may enter up to 2 athletes in each event. The places in each event will be allocated as follows:

Event	Date	Location	Vacancies	Athletes
2007 African Championship	February 22–25, 2007	(Egypt) Cairo	1	(Egypt) Amro El Geziry
2007 Asian Championship	May 8–14, 2007	(Japan) Tokyo	5	(South Korea) Nam Dong-Hun (South Korea) Lee Chun-Heon (China) Cao Zhongrong (China) Qian Zhenhua (Japan) Yoshihiro Murakami
2007 Oceanian Championship	May 8–14, 2007	(Japan) Tokyo	1	~~(Australia) Alex Parygin~~^
2007 European Championship	June 6–13, 2007	(Latvia) Riga	8	(Hungary) Viktor Horváth (Poland) Marcin Horbacz (Russia) Andrey Moiseev (Hungary) Gábor Balogh (Russia) Ilia Frolov (Ukraine) Dmytro Kirpulyanskyy (Czech Republic) David Svoboda (Belarus) Dzmitry Meliakh
2007 Pan-American Games	July 21–22, 2007	(Brazil) Rio de Janeiro	4***	(United States) Eli Bremer (Cuba) Yaniel Velazquez (Canada) Joshua Riker-Fox (Chile) Christian Bustos
2007 World Championships	Aug 16-21, 2007	(Germany) Berlin	3	~~(Hungary) Viktor Horváth~~*; ~~(Russia) Ilia Frolov~~*; ~~(Hungary) Róbert Németh~~**
2007 World Cup Final	September 15–16, 2007	(China) Beijing	1	(Lithuania) Edvinas Krungolcas
2008 World Championship	May 27 - Jun 1, 2008	(Hungary) Budapest	3	~~(Russia) Ilia Frolov~~*; ~~(Czech Republic) David Svoboda~~* (Belarus) Yahor Lapo
Pentathlon World Ranking	June 1, 2008	-	7	(France) Jean Maxence Berrou (Lithuania) Andrejus Zadneprovskis (Germany) Steffen Gebhardt (Germany) Eric Walther (Italy) Nicola Benedetti (Czech Republic) Michal Michalik (Latvia) Deniss Čerkovskis
Host Nation (CHN)	-	-	1****	-
Invitation Places	-	-	2****	-
re-allocation of unused places*****	-	-	+	(Mexico) Oscar Soto (Poland) Bartosz Majewski (Spain) Jaime Lopez (Ukraine) Pavlo Tymoshchenko (United Kingdom) Allan Casey (United States) Sam Sacksen (Italy) Andrea Valentini (France) John Zakrzewski (United Kingdom) Nick Woodbridge
TOTAL			36	

Note: Athletes marked with an asterisk (*) have qualified before, countries with two asterisks (**) already filled their quota of two athletes. The free places cannot be filled by the next competitors from the respective competition, but they will be filled by the world standings at the end of the qualification period. (marked also with one or two asterisks)

*** Top finisher from NORCECA, top finisher from South America, and 2 next highest overall finishers from Pan-America.

**** Unused quotas

***** If one or more athletes qualify through more than 1 criteria, the remaining positions will be allocated through Pentathlon World Ranking

^ Qualification revoked.

=== Women ===
Event	Date	Location	Vacancies	Athletes
2007 African Championship	February 22–25, 2007	(Egypt) Cairo	1	(Egypt) Aya Medany
2007 Asian Championship	May 8–14, 2007	(Japan) Tokyo	5	(Kazakhstan) Lada Jienbalanova (China) Xiu Xiu (China) Chen Qian (Kazakhstan) Galina Dolgushina (South Korea) Yun Cho-Rong
2007 Oceanian Championship	May 8–14, 2007	(Japan) Tokyo	1	(Australia) Angela Darby
2007 European Championship	June 6–13, 2007	(Latvia) Riga	8	(Russia) Evdokia Gretchichnikova (United Kingdom) Heather Fell (Italy) Sara Bertoli (Germany) Lena Schoneborn (Hungary) Zsuzsanna Vörös (United Kingdom) Katy Livingston (Italy) Claudia Corsini (Poland) Sylwia Czwojdzinska
2007 Pan-American Games	July 21–22, 2007	(Brazil) Rio de Janeiro	4***	(Brazil) Yane Marques (Canada) Monica Pinette (Guatemala) Rita Sanz-Agero (Mexico) Marlene Sanchez
2007 World Championships	Aug 16-21, 2007	(Germany) Berlin	3	(France) Amélie Caze; ~~(Germany) Lena Schoneborn~~* (Lithuania) Laura Asadauskaitė
2007 World Cup Final	September 15–16, 2007	(China) Beijing	1	~~(Egypt) Aya Medany~~*
2008 World Championship	May 27 - Jun 1, 2008	(Hungary) Budapest	3	~~(France) Amélie Caze~~*; ~~(Egypt) Aya Medany~~*; ~~(United Kingdom) Katy Livingston~~*
Pentathlon World Ranking	June 1, 2008	-	7	(Belarus) Anastasia Samusevich (Belarus) Anna Arkhipenka (Poland) Paulina Boenisz (Latvia) Jeļena Rubļevska (Czech Republic) Lucie Grolichova (Canada) Kara Grant (United States) Sheila Taormina
Host Nation (CHN)	-	-	1****	-
Invitation Places	-	-	2****	-
re-allocation of unused places*****	-	-	+	(Ukraine) Victoria Tereshchuk (Russia) Tatiana Mouratova (Hungary) Leila Gyenesei (United States) Margaux Isaksen (Lithuania) Donata Rimsaite (Switzerland) Belinda Schreiber (Egypt) Omnia Fakhry (Germany) Eva Trautmann
TOTAL			36	

Note: See above, at the male section.

== Event schedule ==
All times are China Standard Time (UTC+8)

Date	Time	Event
Thursday, August 21, 2008	8:30–9:10	Men's shooting
Thursday, August 21, 2008	10:00–13:15	Men's fencing
Thursday, August 21, 2008	14:30–15:10	Men's swimming
Thursday, August 21, 2008	17:00–19:00	Men's riding
Thursday, August 21, 2008	20:00–20:30	Men's running
Friday, August 22, 2008	8:30–9:10	Women's shooting
Friday, August 22, 2008	10:00–13:15	Women's fencing
Friday, August 22, 2008	14:30–15:10	Women's swimming
Friday, August 22, 2008	17:00–19:00	Women's riding
Friday, August 22, 2008	20:00–20:30	Women's running

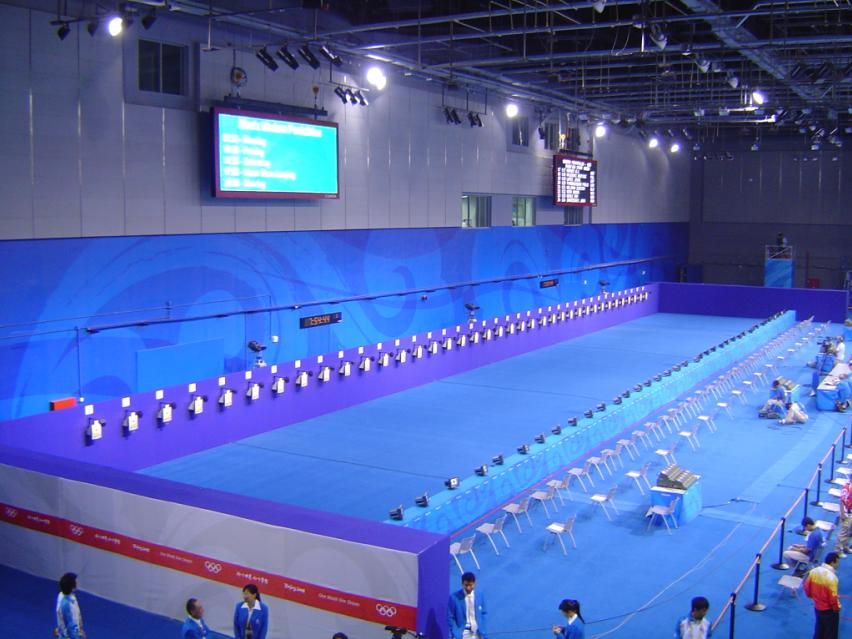
Shooting

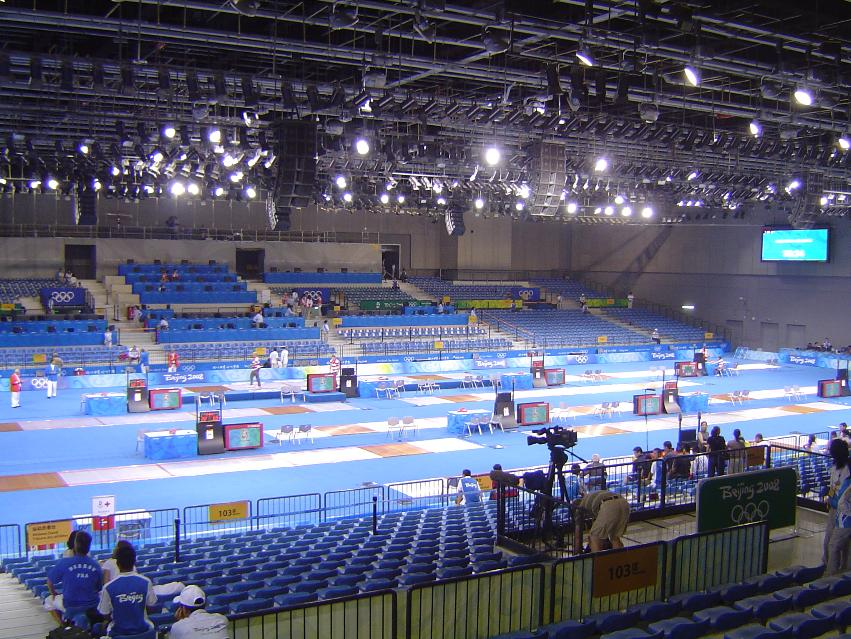
Fencing

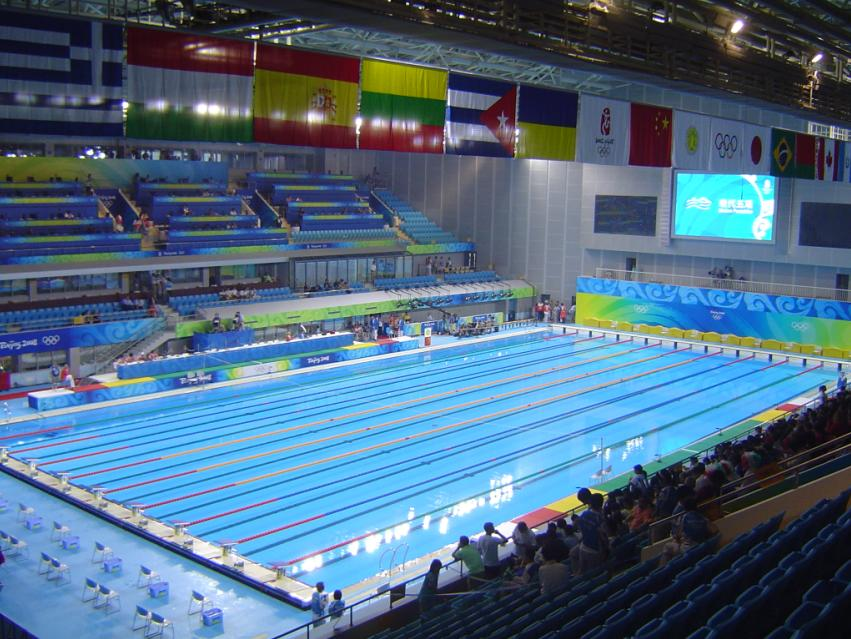
Swimming

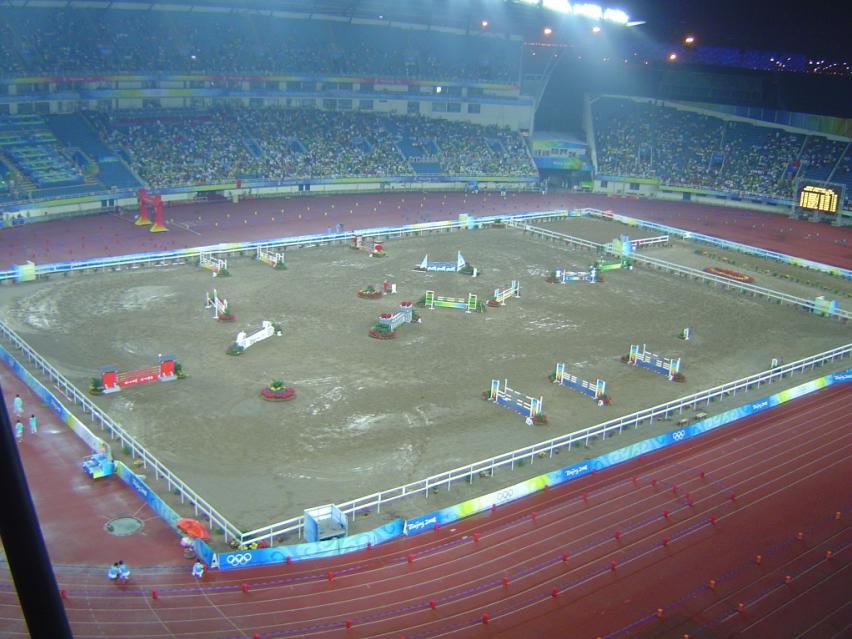
Equestrian and running
