= 2011 in modern pentathlon =

This article lists the main modern pentathlon events and their results for 2011.

== International modern pentathlon events ==
- July 16 – 24: 2011 Military World Games in (Brazil) Rio de Janeiro
  - Individual winners: (South Korea) KIM Jin-hee (m) / (Ukraine) Iryna Khokhlova (f)
  - Mixed Team Relay winners: Latvia (Jeļena Rubļevska & Sandris Sika)
- October 15 & 16: 2011 Pan American Games in (Mexico) Guadalajara
  - Individual winners: (Mexico) Óscar Soto (m) / (United States) Margaux Isaksen (f)

== World modern pentathlon events ==
- August 18 – 21: 2011 World Youth "A" Modern Pentathlon Championships in (Turkey) Istanbul
  - Youth Individual winners: (Russia) Alexander Kukarin (m) / (Guatemala) Isabel Brand (f)
  - Youth Men's Team Relay winners: South Korea (SEONG Jin-soo, Jun Woong-tae, & LEE Min-guk)
  - Youth Women's Team Relay winners: Russia (Ekaterina Makarova, Anastasia Bugrina, & Angelina Marochkina)
  - Youth Mixed Team Relay winners: Belarus (Marharyta Maseikava & Aliaksander Biruk)
  - Youth Men's Team winners: South Korea (SONG Ho-joon, SEONG Jin-soo, & CHOI Min-gyu)
  - Youth Women's Team winners: Mexico (Mayan Oliver, Katia Martinez, & Tamara Vega)
- September 8 – 14: 2011 World Modern Pentathlon Championships in Moscow
  - Individual winners: (Russia) Andrey Moiseyev (m) / (Ukraine) Victoria Tereshchuk (f)
  - Men's Team Relay winners: Hungary (Róbert Kasza, Ádám Marosi, & Peter Tibolya)
  - Women's Team Relay winners: Hungary (Adrienn Tóth, Sarolta Kovács, & Leila Gyenesei)
  - Mixed Team Relay winners: Ukraine (Victoria Tereshchuk & Dmytro Kirpulyanskyy)
  - Men's Team winners: Russia (Sergey Karyakin, Ilia Frolov, & Aleksander Lesun)
  - Women's Team winners: Germany (Eva Trautmann, Annika Schleu, & Lena Schöneborn)
- November 17 – 22: 2011 World Junior Modern Pentathlon Championships in (Argentina) Buenos Aires
  - Junior Individual winners: (United Kingdom) James Cooke (m) / (Hungary) Sarolta Kovács (f)
  - Junior Mixed Team Relay winners: South Korea
  - Junior Men's Team winners: South Korea (Hwang Woo-jin, KIM Soeng-jin, & Kim Dae-beom)
  - Junior Women's Team winners: Great Britain (Kate French, Lydia Rosling, & Freyja Prentice)

== Continental modern pentathlon events ==
- May 19 – 22: 2011 Asian & Oceania Modern Pentathlon Championships in (China) Chengdu
  - Individual winners: (South Korea) HONG Jin-woo (m) / (China) Chen Qian (f)
  - Mixed Team Relay winners: South Korea (Yang Soo-jin, Lee Choon-huan, & Nam Dong-hoon)
- June 2 – 5: 2011 South American Modern Pentathlon Championships in (Brazil) Rio de Janeiro
  - Individual winners: (Brazil) Luis Magno (m) / (Brazil) Priscila Oliveira (f)
- July 13 – 17: 2011 European Youth "B" Modern Pentathlon Championships in Tata
  - Youth Individual winners: (France) Gregory Flayols (m) / (France) Pulcherie Delhalle (f)
  - Youth Mixed Team Relay winners: Hungary
- July 28 – August 1: 2011 European Modern Pentathlon Championships in (United Kingdom) Medway
  - Individual winners: (Russia) Andrey Moiseyev (m) / (Germany) Lena Schöneborn (f)
  - Men's Team Relay winners: Hungary (Bence Demeter, Róbert Kasza, & Ádám Marosi)
  - Women's Team Relay winners: Hungary (Adrienn Tóth, Sarolta Kovács, & Leila Gyenesei)
  - Men's Team winners: Russia (Ilia Frolov, Sergey Karyakin, & Aleksander Lesun)
  - Women's Team winners: Hungary (Leila Gyenesei, Sarolta Kovács, & Adrienn Tóth)
- August 4 – 7: 2011 European Youth "A" Modern Pentathlon Championships in (Hungary) Székesfehérvár
  - Youth Individual winners: (United Kingdom) Joseph Evans (m) / (Hungary) Zsófia Földházi (f)
  - Youth Mixed Team Relay winners: Great Britain
- September 19 – 25: 2011 European Junior Modern Pentathlon Championships in (Poland) Drzonków
  - Junior Individual winners: (Hungary) Bence Demeter (m) / (Hungary) Sarolta Kovács (f)
  - Junior Mixed Team Relay winners: France (Paola Bartoli, Valentin Belaud, Christopher Patte, & Geoffrey Megi)

== 2011 Modern Pentathlon World Cup ==
- February 24 – 27: MPWC #1 in (United States) Palm Springs
  - Individual winners: (Ukraine) Pavlo Tymoshchenko (m) / (France) Amélie Cazé (f)
- April 14 – 17: MPWC #2 in (Italy) Sassari
  - Individual winners: (Hungary) Ádám Marosi (m) / (Russia) Donata Rimšaitė (f)
  - Mixed Team Relay winners: China (WU Yanyan & HAN Jiahao)
- May 5 – 8: MPWC #3 in (Hungary) Budapest
  - Individual winners: (Czech Republic) David Svoboda (m) / (Egypt) Aya Medany (f)
- May 26 – 29: MPWC #4 in (China) Chengdu
  - Individual winners: (South Korea) Lee Choon-huan (m) / (Russia) Ekaterina Khuraskina (f)
  - Mixed Team Relay winners: Germany (Tabea Budde & Delf Borrmann)
- July 9 & 10: MPWC #5 (final) in (United Kingdom) London
  - Individual winners: (Hungary) Róbert Kasza (m) / (Germany) Lena Schöneborn (f)
