= 2008 in modern pentathlon =

This article lists the main modern pentathlon events and their results for 2008.

== 2008 Summer Olympics (UIPM) ==
- August 20 – 26: 2008 Summer Olympics in Beijing at the Olympic Sports Centre, the Ying Tung Natatorium, & the China National Convention Center
  - Men: (gold) (Russia) Andrey Moiseyev; (silver) (Lithuania) Edvinas Krungolcas; (bronze) (Lithuania) Andrejus Zadneprovskis
  - Women: (gold) (Germany) Lena Schöneborn; (silver) (United Kingdom) Heather Fell; (bronze) (Belarus) Anastasiya Prokopenko

== Other international modern pentathlon events ==
- July 25 – 28: 2008 CISM Modern Pentathlon Championships in (Latvia) Riga
  - Individual winners: (Austria) Thomas Daniel (m) / (Latvia) Jeļena Rubļevska (f)
  - Men's Team Relay winner: (Latvia) Sandris Sika

== World modern pentathlon events ==
- May 27 – June 3: 2008 World Modern Pentathlon Championships in (Hungary) Budapest
  - Individual winners: (Russia) Ilia Frolov (m) / (France) Amélie Cazé (f)
  - Team Relay winners: (Belarus) Mihail Prokopenko (m) / (Hungary) Sarolta Kovács (f)
- July 6 – 13: 2008 World Junior Modern Pentathlon Championships in (Egypt) Cairo
  - Junior Individual winners: (Russia) Sergey Karyakin (m) / (Egypt) Aya Medany (f)
- September 18 – 21: 2008 World Youth "A" & Combined Modern Pentathlon Championships in (Bulgaria) Albena
  - Youth Individual winners: (Hungary) Bence Demeter (m) / (United States) Margaux Isaksen (f)
  - Youth Team Relay winners: (Hungary) Bence Demeter (m) / (Hungary) Sarolta Kovács (f)
  - Youth Combined winners: (Mexico) Alvaro Sandoval (m) / (Poland) Joanna Gomolinska (f)

== Continental modern pentathlon events ==
- March 13 – 16: 2008 NORCECA Senior & Junior Modern Pentathlon Championships in Mexico City
  - Senior/Junior Individual winners: (Egypt) Yasser Hefny (m) / (Egypt) Omnia Fakhry (f)
  - Senior/Junior Women's Team Relay winner: (Brazil) Larissa Lellys
- April 26 – May 1: 2008 Asian Modern Pentathlon Championships in (Kyrgyzstan) Bishkek
  - Individual winners: (Kazakhstan) Nurjan Kusmoldanov (m) / (Kazakhstan) Galina Dolgushina (f)
- April 29 – May 4: 2008 European Junior Modern Pentathlon Championships in (Poland) Drzonków
  - Junior Individual winners: (Belarus) Mikhail Mitsyk (m) / (Hungary) Sarolta Kovács (f)
  - Junior Men's Team Relay winners: Russia (Sergey Karyakin & Roman Kholodkov)
- July 2 – 7: 2008 European Youth "B" Modern Pentathlon Championships in (Republic of Ireland) Dublin
  - Youth Individual winners: (Hungary) Mate Telek (m) / (Hungary) Zsófia Földházi (f)
  - Youth Team Relay winners: (Hungary) Mate Telek (m) / (Hungary) Csilla Schlauszky (f)
- July 14 – 20: 2008 European Modern Pentathlon Championships in (Russia) Moscow
  - Individual winners: (Russia) Andrey Moiseyev (m) / (Ukraine) Victoria Tereshchuk (f)
  - Team Relay winners: (Lithuania) Andrejus Zadneprovskis (m) / (Lithuania) Laura Asadauskaitė (f)
- July 22 – 27: 2008 European Youth "A" & Combined Modern Pentathlon Championships in (Sweden) Kalmar
  - Youth Individual winners: (Belarus) Raman Pinchuk (m) / (Poland) Joanna Gomolinska (f)
  - Youth Team Relay winners: (Hungary) Bence Demeter (m) / (Hungary) Sarolta Kovács (f)
  - Youth Combined winners: (France) Christopher Patte (m) / (Poland) Joanna Gomolinska (f)
- October 1 – 5: 2008 South American Senior and Junior Modern Pentathlon Championships in Venezuela
  - Senior/Junior Individual winners: (Chile) Cristian Bustos (m) / (Brazil) Larissa Lellys (f)
- October 31 – November 2: 2008 NORCECA Youth "A" & "B" Modern Pentathlon Championships in (United States) Cleveland
  - Youth Individual winners: (United States) Nathan Schrimsher (m) / (United States) Anna Olesinski (f)

== 2008 Modern Pentathlon World Cup ==
- February 19 – 22: MPWC #1 in (Egypt) Cairo
  - Individual winners: (Lithuania) Andrejus Zadneprovskis (m) / (United Kingdom) Katy Livingston (f)
- March 4 – 9: MPWC #2 in Mexico City
  - Individual winners: (France) Jean Maxence Berrou (m) / (Poland) Marta Dziadura (f)
- March 27 – 30: MPWC #3 in (United Kingdom) Millfield
  - Individual winners: (Czech Republic) Ondřej Polívka (m) / (United Kingdom) Heather Fell (f)
- April 10 – 13: MPWC #4 in (Spain) Madrid
  - Individual winners: (Hungary) Gábor Balogh (m) / (Belarus) Anastasiya Prokopenko (f)
- May 8 – 11: MPWC #5 in (Czech Republic) Kladno
  - Individual winners: (France) Jean Maxence Berrou (m) / (Egypt) Aya Medany (f)
- October 3 – 5: MPWC #6 (final) in (Portugal) Caldas da Rainha
  - Individual winners: (Hungary) Róbert Kasza (m) / (Russia) Donata Rimšaitė (f)
