= 2009 in modern pentathlon =

This article lists the main modern pentathlon events and their results for 2009.

== 2010 YOG qualification events ==
- October 1 – 5: YOG 2010 Continental Qualifier - Europe in (Hungary) Budapest
  - Youth Individual winners: (Poland) Pawel Golik (m) / (Hungary) Zsófia Földházi (f)
  - Youth Team Relay winner: (Russia) Alexandra Savvina
- December 3 – 6: YOG 2010 Continental Qualifier - Pan America in (Argentina) Buenos Aires
  - Youth Individual winners: (Guatemala) Andrei Gheorghe (m) / (Brazil) Yane Marques (f)
- December 5: YOG 2010 Qualifier in (Argentina) Buenos Aires
  - Youth Individual winners: (Mexico) Jorge Abraham Camacho (m) / (Mexico) Tamara Vega (f)
- December 18 – 20: YOG 2010 Continental Qualifier - Asia & Oceania in Singapore
  - Youth Individual winners: (South Korea) PARK Sang-gu (m) / (China) ZHU Wenjing (f)

== World modern pentathlon championships ==
- July 6 – 12: 2009 World Junior Modern Pentathlon Championships in (Chinese Taipei) Kaohsiung
  - Junior Individual winners: (South Korea) AHN Ji-hun (m) / (Egypt) Aya Medany (f)
  - Junior Team Relay winners: (South Korea) AHN Ji-hun (m) / (Germany) Janine Kohlmann (f)
  - Junior Mixed winner: (South Korea) Yang Soo-jin
- July 22 – 27: 2009 World Youth "A" Modern Pentathlon Championships in (Egypt) Cairo
  - Youth Individual winners: (Hungary) Gergely Demeter (m) / (Hungary) Zsófia Földházi (f)
  - Youth Team Relay winners: (South Korea) KIM Soeng-jin (m) / (Hungary) Zsófia Földházi (f)
  - Youth Mixed winner: (China) GUO Jing
- August 11 – 19: 2009 World Modern Pentathlon Championships in (United Kingdom) London
  - Individual winners: (Hungary) Ádám Marosi (m) / (China) Chen Qian (f)
  - Mixed Team Relay winners: Czech Republic (David Svoboda & Lucie Grolichová)

== Continental modern pentathlon championships ==
- April 28 – May 3: 2009 European Junior Modern Pentathlon Championships in (Bulgaria) Albena
  - Junior Individual winners: (Russia) Maxim Kuznetsov (m) / (Hungary) Sarolta Kovács (f)
  - Junior Team Relay winners: (Poland) Remigiusz Golis (m) / (Hungary) Sarolta Kovács (f)
  - Junior Mixed winner: (Czech Republic) Natalie Dianová
- June 5 – 7: 2009 NORCECA Modern Pentathlon Championships in (United States) Palm Springs
  - Individual winners: (United States) Dennis Bowsher (m) / (United States) Margaux Isaksen (f)
- June 7 – 13: 2009 Asian Modern Pentathlon Championships in (South Korea) Seoul
  - Individual winners: (South Korea) Jung Jin-hwa (m) / (China) Xiu Xiu (f)
  - Team Relay winners: (Japan) Shinichi Tomii (m) / China (Chen Qian & ZHU Wenjing) (f)
- June 25 – 30: 2009 European Modern Pentathlon Championships in (Germany) Leipzig
  - Individual winners: (Czech Republic) Ondřej Polívka (m) / (France) Amélie Cazé (f)
  - Team Relay winners: (Lithuania) Edvinas Krungolcas (m) / (Czech Republic) Lucie Grolichová (f)
- July 1 – 5: 2009 European Youth "B" Modern Pentathlon Championships in (Portugal) Abrantes
  - Youth Individual winners: (Poland) Michal Gralewski (m) / (Hungary) Zsófia Földházi (f)
  - Youth Team Relay winners: (Poland) Michal Gralewski (m) / (Hungary) Zsófia Földházi (f)

== 2009 Modern Pentathlon World Cup ==
- March 24 – 29: MPWC #1 in Mexico City
  - Note: This event was supposed to be held in Palm Springs, but it was cancelled.
  - Individual winners: (Poland) Marcin Horbacz (m) / (Egypt) Aya Medany (f)
- April 16 – 19: MPWC #2 in (Egypt) Cairo
  - Individual winners: (Czech Republic) Ondřej Polívka (m) / (Lithuania) Laura Asadauskaitė (f)
- May 7 – 10: MPWC #3 for Men in (Hungary) Budapest
  - Winner: (Latvia) Deniss Čerkovskis
- May 14 – 17: MPWC #3 for Women in (Hungary) Székesfehérvár
  - Winner: (Lithuania) Laura Asadauskaitė
- May 20 – 25: MPWC #4 in (Italy) Rome
  - Individual winners: (Russia) Ilia Frolov (m) / (Egypt) Aya Medany (f)
- September 11 – 13: MPWC #5 (final) in (Brazil) Rio de Janeiro
  - Individual winners: (Hungary) Ádám Marosi (m) / (Russia) Donata Rimšaitė (f)
