= Modern pentathlon at the 2011 Pan American Games – Men's =

Men's individual Modern pentathlon at the 2011 Pan American Games
- Venue: Hipica Club
- Dates: October 16
- Competitors: 25 from 13 nations

Medalists
| Gold medal | Oscar Soto | Mexico |
| Silver medal | Andrei Gheorghe | Guatemala |
| Bronze medal | Esteban Bustos | Chile |

The men's Individual competition of the modern pentathlon events at the 2011 Pan American Games was held on October 16 at the Hipica Club. The defending Pan American Games champion is Eli Bremer of the United States. While the Pan American Championship, champion is William Brady also of the United States.

The top placing athlete from North America and South America along with the two other athletes not already qualified were awarded spots to compete at the 2012 Summer Olympics in London, Great Britain. The two spots were assigned to the two best placed not already qualified irrespective of region.

== Format ==
For the first time at a Pan American Games, the modern pentathlon events will introduce laser shooting (as opposed to pistol shooting) and a combined shooting/running event. Athletes will compete first in epée fencing followed by swimming the 200 metre freestyle, thirdly in equestrian (jumping) and finally in the combined shooting/running event. The athlete that crosses the line first wins.

== Schedule ==
| Date | Time | Round |
|---|---|---|
| October 16, 2011 | 9:00 | Fencing |
| October 16, 2011 | 12:00 | Swimming |
| October 16, 2011 | 13:30 | Equestrian |
| October 16, 2011 | 13:30 | Combined shooting/running event |

== Results ==
| Qualified for the 2012 Summer Olympics |

| Rank | Athlete | Fencing Victories (pts) | Swimming Time (pts) | Equestrian Score (pts) | Combined Shooting/Running Time (pts) | Score |
|---|---|---|---|---|---|---|
| 1st place, gold medalist(s) | Oscar Soto (MEX) | 14 (892) | 2:09.27 (1252) | 0.00 (1200) | 10:53.24 (2384) | 5728 |
| 2nd place, silver medalist(s) | Andrei Gheorghe (GUA) | 18 (1036) | 2:16.13 (1168) | 36.00 (1164) | 11:13.63 (2304) | 5672 |
| 3rd place, bronze medalist(s) | Esteban Bustos (CHI) | 14 (892) | 2:13.00 (1204) | 8.00 (1192) | 10:57.23 (2368) | 5656 |
| 4 | Dennis Bowsher (USA) | 12 (820) | 2:03.84 (1316) | 0.00 (1200) | 11:12.01 (2308) | 5644 |
| 5 | Emmanuel Zapata (ARG) | 14 (892) | 2:09.98 (1244) | 0.00 (1200) | 11:25.58 (2256) | 5592 |
| 6 | Samuel Sacksen (USA) | 11 (784) | 2:08.91 (1256) | 80.00 (1120) | 10:47.3 (2408) | 5568 |
| 7 | Nikkos Papadopolo (GUA) | 17 (1000) | 2:09.24 (1252) | 0.00 (1200) | 12:13.68 (2064) | 5516 |
| 8 | Joshua Riker Fox (CAN) | 17 (1000) | 2:10.23 (1240) | 52.00 (1148) | 12:22.14 (2028) | 5416 |
| 9 | Christopher Pietruczuk (CAN) | 11 (784) | 2:11.03 (1228) | 0.00 (1200) | 11:48.45 (2164) | 5376 |
| 10 | Abraham Camacho (MEX) | 10 (748) | 2:11.79 (1220) | 88.00 (1112) | 11:21.55 (2271) | 5352 |
| 11 | Luis Magno (BRA) | 10 (736) | 2:06.91 (1280) | 24.00 (1176) | 11:53.62 (2144) | 5336 |
| 12 | Wagner Romao (BRA) | 13 (856) | 2:07.22 (1276) | 144.00 (1056) | 12:00.63 (2116) | 5292 |
| 13 | Yaniel Velazquez (CUB) | 10 (748) | 2:11.10 (1228) | 0.00 (1200) | 12:00.63 (2144) | 5292 |
| 14 | David Ruales (ECU) | 12 (820) | 2:16.03 (1168) | 40.00 (1160) | 11:53.96 (2144) | 5292 |
| 15 | Abel Alvarez (CUB) | 7 (640) | 2:11.20 (1228) | 20.00 (1180) | 11:57.38 (2128) | 5176 |
| 16 | Sergio Villamayor (ARG) | 14 (880) | 2:25.48 (1056) | 0.00 (1200) | 12:33.54 (1988) | 5124 |
| 17 | Cristian Bustos (CHI) | 9 (712) | 2:17.68 (1148) | 152.00 (1048) | 12:33.45 (1988) | 4896 |
| 18 | Yacil Valera (DOM) | 15 (928) | 2:23.93 (1076) | 20.00 (1180) | 13:46.86 (1696) | 4880 |
| 19 | Roberto Arauz (ECU) | 8 (676) | 2:22.66 (1088) | 40.00 (1160) | 13:30.21 (1760) | 4684 |
| 20 | Luis Jimenez (VEN) | 9 (712) | 2:43.06 (844) | 12.00 (1188) | 12:50.90 (1920) | 4664 |
| 21 | Julio Benjamin (DOM) | 14 (892) | 2:19.98 (1124) | 368.00 (832) | 14:33.07 (1508) | 4356 |
| 22 | Luis Siri (URU) | 7 (640) | 2:36.34 (924) | 172.00 (1028) | 16:23.73 (1068) | 3660 |
| 23 | Armando Abaunza (PAN) | 6 (604) | 2:18.71 (1136) | 640.00 (560) | 16:27.40 (1052) | 3352 |
| 24 | Eduardo Salas (VEN) | 6 (604) | 2:13.49 (1200) | 1112.00 (88) | 16:53.21 (948) | 2840 |
| | Jose Guitian (PAN) | 19 (1072) | DSQ (0) | DNS (0) | DNS (0) | DNF |
