= 2011 European Modern Pentathlon Championships =

The 2011 European Modern Pentathlon Championships were held in Medway, Great Britain from July 28 to August 1, 2011.

== Medal summary ==
=== Men's events ===
Event	Gold	Silver	Bronze
Individual	Andrey Moiseev (RUS)	Sergey Karyakin (RUS)	Dmytro Kirpulyanskyy (UKR)
Team	Russia; Ilia Frolov; Sergey Karyakin; Aleksander Lesun	Italy; Nicola Benedetti; Riccardo De Luca; Pierpaolo Petroni	Czech Republic; Ondrej Polivka; Michal Sedlecky; David Svoboda
Relay	Hungary; Bence Demeter; Róbert Kasza; Ádám Marosi	Poland; Łukasz Klekot; Bartosz Majewski; Szymon Staśkiewicz	Belarus; Mikalai Hayanouski; Dzmitry Meliakh; Stanislau Zhurauliou

=== Women's events ===
Event	Gold	Silver	Bronze
Individual	Lena Schöneborn (GER)	Adrienn Tóth (HUN)	Victoria Tereshchuk (UKR)
Team	Hungary; Leila Gyenesei; Sarolta Kovács; Adrienn Tóth	Germany; Annika Schleu; Lena Schöneborn; Eva Trautmann	France; Elfie Arnaud; Amélie Cazé; Anaïs Eudes
Relay	Hungary; Leila Gyenesei; Sarolta Kovács; Adrienn Tóth	Germany; Annika Schleu; Lena Schöneborn; Eva Trautmann	France; Elfie Arnaud; Amélie Cazé; Anais Eudes

=== Medal table ===
Rank	Nation	Gold	Silver	Bronze	Total
1	Hungary	3	1	0	4
2	Russia	2	1	0	3
3	Germany	1	2	0	3
4	Italy	0	1	0	1
4	Poland	0	1	0	1
6	France	0	0	2	2
6	Ukraine	0	0	2	2
8	Belarus	0	0	1	1
8	Czech Republic	0	0	1	1
Totals (9 entries)		6	6	6	18
