= 2012 European Modern Pentathlon Championships =

The 2012 European Modern Pentathlon Championships were held in Sofia, Bulgaria from July 4 to 10, 2012.

== Medal summary ==
=== Men's events ===
Event	Gold	Silver	Bronze
Individual	Riccardo De Luca (ITA)	Róbert Kasza (HUN)	Bence Demeter (HUN)
Team	Russia; Ilia Frolov; Aleksander Lesun; Andrey Moiseyev	Hungary; Bence Demeter; Róbert Kasza; Ádám Marosi	Czech Republic; Jan Kuf; Michal Michalík; Michal Sedlecký
Relay	Russia; Ilia Frolov; Sergey Karyakin; Alexander Savkin	Ukraine; Pavlo Kirpulyanskyy; Oleksandr Mordasov; Ruslan Nakonechnyi	Belarus; Mikhail Mitsyk; Raman Pinchuk; Aliaksandr Vasilionak

=== Women's events ===
Event	Gold	Silver	Bronze
Individual	Laura Asadauskaitė (LTU)	Iryna Khokhlova (UKR)	Ganna Buriak (UKR)
Team	Russia; Evdokia Gretchichnikova; Ekaterina Khuraskina; Donata Rimsaite	Great Britain; Katy Burke; Heather Fell; Freyja Prentice	Hungary; Leila Gyenesei; Sarolta Kovács; Adrienn Tóth
Relay	Russia; Svetlana Lebedeva; Donata Rimsaite; Anna Savchenko	Poland; Sylwia Gawlikowska; Aleksandra Skarzyńska; Katarzyna Wójcik	Great Britain; Katy Burke; Heather Fell; Freyja Prentice

=== Mixed events ===
Event	Gold	Silver	Bronze
Relay	Belarus; Anastasiya Prokopenko; Mihail Prokopenko	Lithuania; Laura Asadauskaitė; Justinas Kinderis	Czech Republic; Natalie Dianová; David Svoboda

=== Medal table ===
Rank	Nation	Gold	Silver	Bronze	Total
1	Russia	4	0	0	4
2	Lithuania	1	1	0	2
3	Belarus	1	0	1	2
4	Italy	1	0	0	1
5	Hungary	0	2	2	4
6	Ukraine	0	2	1	3
7	Great Britain	0	1	1	2
8	Poland	0	1	0	1
9	Czech Republic	0	0	2	2
Totals (9 entries)		7	7	7	21
