= Modern pentathlon at the 2012 Summer Olympics – Women's =

Women's modern pentathlon at the Games of the XXX Olympiad
- Venue: Copper Box (fencing); Aquatics Centre (swimming); Greenwich Park (riding and combined)
- Date: 12 August
- Competitors: 36 from 22 nations
- Winning score: 5408 OR

Medalists
1st place, gold medalist(s)		Laura Asadauskaitė	Lithuania
2nd place, silver medalist(s)		Samantha Murray	Great Britain
3rd place, bronze medalist(s)		Yane Marques	Brazil

The women's modern pentathlon at the 2012 Summer Olympics in London was held on 12 August. Three venues were used: the Copper Box (fencing), Aquatics Centre (swimming) and Greenwich Park (horse-riding and combined running and shooting).

Laura Asadauskaitė from Lithuania won the gold medal, breaking an Olympic record with her final score of 5,408 points. Great Britain's Samantha Murray won silver, and fifth overall for the women's since 2000. Meanwhile, Yane Marques became Brazil's first Olympic medalist in modern pentathlon, taking the bronze. Belarus' Anastasiya Prokopenko set an Olympic record for the combined running and shooting event, with a time of 11:06.00, but finished only in sixth place.

== Competition format ==
The modern pentathlon consisted of five events, all held on the same day. The format was slightly different from the typical modern pentathlon, with two events combined at the end.

- Fencing: A round-robin, one-touch épée competition. Score was based on winning percentage.
- Swimming: A 200 m freestyle race. Score was based on time.
- Riding: A show jumping competition. Score based on penalties for fallen bars, refusals, falls, and being over the time limit.
- Combined running/shooting: A 3 km run with pistol shooting (the athlete must hit five targets in 70 seconds) every kilometre. Starts were staggered based on points from the previous three events.

== Schedule ==
All times are British Summer Time (UTC+1)

Date	Time	Round
Sunday, 12 August 2012	08:00	Fencing
Sunday, 12 August 2012	12:35	Swimming
Sunday, 12 August 2012	14:35	Riding
Sunday, 12 August 2012	18:00	Combined running/shooting

== Results ==
Thirty-six athletes participated.

Rank	Athlete	Country	Fencing Victories (pts)	Swimming Time (pts)	Riding Time (pts)	Combined Time (pts)	Total
1st place, gold medalist(s)	Laura Asadauskaitė	Lithuania	23 (952)	2:18.67 (1136)	72.26 (1180)	11:55.64 (2140)	5408 (OR)
2nd place, silver medalist(s)	Samantha Murray	Great Britain	18 (832)	2:08.20 (1264)	80.27 (1140)	12:00.59 (2120)	5356
3rd place, bronze medalist(s)	Yane Marques	Brazil	21 (904)	2:12.39 (1212)	77.71 (1152)	12:12.08 (2072)	5340
4	Margaux Isaksen	United States	22 (928)	2:18.53 (1140)	61.56 (1120)	11:54.51 (2144)	5332
5	Chen Qian	China	21 (904)	2:17.77 (1148)	85.30 (1120)	11:52.20 (2152)	5324
6	Anastasiya Prokopenko	Belarus	15 (760)	2:28.50 (1020)	73.16 (1140)	11:06.00 (2336)	5256
7	Chloe Esposito	Australia	14 (736)	2:12.28 (1216)	76.74 (1156)	11:55.40 (2140)	5248
8	Jeļena Rubļevska	Latvia	25 (1000)	2:26.93 (1040)	81.41 (1136)	12:17.22 (2052)	5228
9	Natalya Coyle	Ireland	19 (856)	2:19.17 (1132)	72.20 (1160)	12:12.45 (2072)	5220
10	Iryna Khokhlova	Ukraine	18 (832)	2:16.22 (1168)	72.90 (1200)	12:32.44 (1992)	5192
11	Melanie McCann	Canada	19 (856)	2:21.56 (1104)	72.20 (1180)	12:20.23 (2040)	5180
12	Gintarė Venčkauskaitė	Lithuania	10 (640)	2:16.88 (1160)	69.57 (1160)	11:36.63 (2216)	5176
13	Sylwia Gawlikowska	Poland	17 (808)	2:17.35 (1152)	78.78 (1148)	12:15.27 (2060)	5168
14	Miao Yihua	China	20 (880)	2:19.31 (1132)	81.87 (1136)	12:26.31 (2016)	5164
15	Lena Schöneborn	Germany	19 (856)	2:19.76 (1124)	92.43 (1052)	11:58.18 (2128)	5160
16	Aya Medany	Egypt	20 (880)	2:18.70 (1136)	79.27 (1124)	12:31.92 (1996)	5136
17	Ekaterina Khuraskina	Russia	18 (832)	2:29.07 (1012)	68.81 (1160)	11:59.04 (2124)	5128
18	Amélie Cazé	France	19 (856)	2:11.33 (1224)	74.59 (1180)	13:08.71 (1848)	5108
19	Katarzyna Wójcik	Poland	16 (784)	2:20.94 (1112)	62.74 (1140)	12:17.69 (2052)	5088
20	Adrienn Tóth	Hungary	24 (976)	2:17.32 (1156)	72.35 (1100)	13:06.33 (1852)	5084
21	Mhairi Spence	Great Britain	19 (856)	2:16.51 (1164)	81.85 (1096)	12:46.23 (1936)	5052
22	Natálie Dianová	Czech Republic	17 (808)	2:13.78 (1196)	86.79 (1056)	13:33.61 (1988)	5048
23	Victoria Tereshchuk	Ukraine	14 (736)	2:16.07 (1168)	88.64 (1068)	12:24.64 (2024)	4996
24	Yang Soo-Jin	South Korea	14 (736)	2:17.93 (1148)	65.98 (1120)	12:40.71 (1960)	4964
25	Claudia Cesarini	Italy	15 (760)	2:22.77 (1088)	89.15 (1044)	12:25.66 (2020)	4912
26	Annika Schleu	Germany	12 (688)	2:20.01 (1120)	74.16 (1140)	12:46.04 (1936)	4884
27	Sabrina Crognale	Italy	20 (880)	2:24.24 (1072)	78.56 (1128)	13:27.22 (1772)	4852
28	Suzanne Stettinius	United States	11 (664)	2:22.29 (1096)	71.40 (1120)	12:42.84 (1952)	4832
29	Donna Vakalis	Canada	17 (808)	2:22.19 (1096)	104.64 (844)	12:10.03 (2080)	4828
30	Shino Yamanaka	Japan	7 (568)	2:30.36 (996)	76.02 (1136)	11:58.56 (2128)	4828
31	Elodie Clouvel	France	15 (760)	2:09.87 (1244)	90.63 (1060)	13:44.50 (1704)	4768
32	Hanna Vasilionak	Belarus	16 (784)	2:32.87 (968)	101.92 (1016)	12:49.61 (1924)	4692
33	Sarolta Kovács	Hungary	11 (664)	2:08.11 (1264)	DNF (420)	12:43.69 (1948)	4396
34	Narumi Kurosu	Japan	8 (592)	2:22.39 (1092)	144.18 (704)	13:52.94 (1672)	4060
35	Evdokia Gretchichnikova	Russia	22 (928)	2:26.75 (1040)	DNF (0)	12:59.87 (1884)	3852
36	Tamara Vega	Mexico	16 (784)	2:18.72 (1136)	DNF (460)	DNS (0)	2380

== Records ==
For the first time in Olympic history, the women's modern pentathlon has broken multiple Olympic records in the every sporting discipline, with the exception of fencing and horse-riding.

Broken Olympic records during the 2012 Summer Olympics
Total	Laura Asadauskaitė (LTU)	5408
Swimming	Sarolta Kovács (HUN)	2:08.11
Running	Anastasiya Prokopenko (BLR)	10:20.90 (WR)
Combined	Anastasiya Prokopenko (BLR)	11:06.00
Shooting - 1 session of 5 shots	Anastasiya Prokopenko (BLR)	9.0
Shooting - 3 session of 15 shots	Gintarė Venčkauskaitė (LTU)	33.8
