= Modern pentathlon at the 2008 Summer Olympics – Women's =

Women's modern pentathlon at the Games of the XXIX Olympiad
- Venue: Olympic Green Convention Center (shooting and fencing); Ying Tung Natatorium (swimming); Olympic Sports Center Stadium (riding and running)
- Date: 22 August
- Competitors: 32 from 20 nations
- Winning score: 5792

Medalists
1st place, gold medalist(s)		Lena Schöneborn	Germany
2nd place, silver medalist(s)		Heather Fell	Great Britain
3rd place, bronze medalist(s)		Anastasiya Samusevich	Belarus

The women's modern pentathlon at the 2008 Summer Olympics in Beijing was held on Friday, August 22. Three venues were used: Olympic Green Convention Center (shooting and fencing), Ying Tung Natatorium (swimming), and the Olympic Sports Center Stadium (horse-riding and running).

Lena Schöneborn of Germany won the gold medal in the women's event, with a score of 5,792 points. Meanwhile, Heather Fell claimed Great Britain's first ever silver medal, and fourth overall in the women's event. Victoria Tereshchuk of Ukraine won the nation's first ever Olympic medal in modern pentathlon, taking the bronze, but was subsequently stripped of the medal after a doping re-test.

== Competition format ==
The modern pentathlon consisted of five events, with all five held in one day.

- Shooting: A 4.5 mm air pistol shooting (the athlete must hit 20 shots, one at each target). Score was based on the number of shots hitting at each target.
- Fencing: A round-robin, one-touch épée competition. Score was based on winning percentage.
- Swimming: A 200 m freestyle race. Score was based on time.
- Horse-riding: A show jumping competition. Score based on penalties for fallen bars, refusals, falls, and being over the time limit.
- Running: A 3 km run. Starts are staggered (based on points from first four events), so that the first to cross the finish line wins.

== Schedule ==
All times are China Standard Time (UTC+8)

Date	Time	Round
Friday, 22 August 2008	08:30	Shooting
Friday, 22 August 2008	10:00	Fencing
Friday, 22 August 2008	14:30	Swimming
Friday, 22 August 2008	17:00	Riding
Friday, 22 August 2008	20:00	Running

== Results ==
Rank	Athlete	Country	Shooting Score (pts)	Fencing Victories (pts)	Swimming Time (pts)	Equestrian Time (pts)	Running Time (pts)	Total
1st place, gold medalist(s)	Lena Schöneborn	Germany	177 (1060)	28 (1072)	2:16.91 (1280)	68.05 (1172)	10:28.82 (1208)	5792
2nd place, silver medalist(s)	Heather Fell	Great Britain	185 (1156)	20 (880)	2:12.77 (1328)	71.58 (1144)	10:19.28 (1244)	5752
3rd place, bronze medalist(s)	Anastasiya Samusevich	Belarus	187 (1180)	19 (856)	2:29.64 (1128)	67.60 (1172)	10:04.46 (1304)	5640
4	Chen Qian	China	177 (1060)	20 (880)	2:18.58 (1260)	68.65 (1200)	10:27.41 (1212)	5612
5	Paulina Boenisz	Poland	183 (1132)	21 (904)	2:24.08 (1192)	83.27 (1096)	10:20.95 (1240)	5564
6	Katy Livingston	Great Britain	178 (1072)	17 (808)	2:15.68 (1292)	67.28 (1172)	10:29.47 (1204)	5548
7	Aya Medany	Egypt	184 (1144)	22 (928)	2:15.69 (1292)	71.78 (1004)	10:36.05 (1176)	5544
8	Amélie Caze	France	177 (1060)	22 (928)	2:11.29 (1348)	72.83 (1116)	10:59.82 (1084)	5536
9	Xiu Xiu	China	183 (1132)	19 (856)	2:17.17 (1276)	69.84 (1144)	11:06.31 (1056)	5464
10	Belinda Schreiber	Switzerland	188 (1192)	18 (832)	2:16.96 (1280)	66.82 (1172)	11:23.70 (988)	5464
11	Tatiana Mouratova	Russia	179 (1084)	22 (928)	2:22.98 (1208)	76.56 (1108)	10:49.35 (1124)	5452
12	Donata Rimšaitė	Lithuania	175 (1036)	17 (808)	2:20.57 (1236)	67.38 (1088)	10:13.76 (1268)	5436
13	Claudia Corsini	Italy	184 (1144)	14 (736)	2:19.22 (1252)	69.83 (1116)	10:40.01 (1160)	5408
14	Laura Asadauskaitė	Lithuania	175 (1036)	12 (688)	2:21.76 (1220)	68.94 (1200)	10:18.95 (1248)	5392
15	Lucie Grolichová	Czech Republic	177 (1060)	23 (952)	2:19.78 (1244)	60.79 (1060)	11:06.47 (1056)	5372
16	Sylwia Czwojdzińska	Poland	174 (1024)	21 (904)	2:18.76 (1256)	83.30 (1040)	10:52.41 (1112)	5336
17	Yane Marques	Brazil	185 (1156)	19 (856)	2:15.44 (1296)	85.86 (948)	11:01.61 (1076)	5332
18	Sheila Taormina	United States	173 (1012)	4 (496)	2:08.86 (1376)	71.54 (1200)	10:25.05 (1220)	5304
19	Zsuzsanna Vörös	Hungary	182 (1120)	15 (760)	2:16.96 (1280)	77.62 (1076)	11:04.30 (1064)	5300
20	Margaux Isaksen	United States	171 (988)	15 (760)	2:20.30 (1240)	71.59 (1144)	10:40.41 (1160)	5292
21	Hanna Arkhipenka	Belarus	180 (1096)	16 (784)	2:27.06 (1156)	66.24 (1144)	10:53.23 (1108)	5288
22	Jeļena Rubļevska	Latvia	181 (908)	27 (1048)	2:22.94 (1208)	74.64 (980)	10:49.35 (1124)	5268
23	Leila Gyenesei	Hungary	171 (988)	13 (712)	2:13.84 (1316)	67.13 (1172)	11:02.35 (1072)	5260
24	Evdokia Gretchichnikova	Russia	178 (1072)	20 (880)	2:26.37 (1164)	70.17 (976)	10:43.65 (1148)	5240
25	Galina Dolgushina	Kazakhstan	176 (1048)	23 (952)	2:26.28 (1168)	69.21 (1144)	11:44.57 (904)	5216
26	Monica Pinette	Canada	187 (1180)	11 (664)	2:29.95 (1124)	67.88 (1144)	11:00.45 (1080)	5192
27	Marlene Sánchez	Mexico	186 (1168)	17 (808)	2:27.39 (1152)	92.47 (1020)	11:18.11 (1008)	5156
28	Eva Trautmann	Germany	168 (952)	9 (616)	2:17.17 (1276)	80.46 (1024)	10:40.25 (1160)	5028
29	Omnia Fakhry	Egypt	186 (1168)	17 (808)	2:15.72 (1292)	102.51 (776)	11:32.10 (952)	4996
30	Kara Grant	Canada	178 (1072)	15 (760)	2:45.26 (940)	67.27 (1060)	10:44.45 (1144)	4976
31	Sara Bertoli	Italy	174 (1024)	13 (712)	2:21.92 (1220)	107.07 (872)	10:48.46 (1128)	4956
32	Yun Cho-Rong	South Korea	166 (928)	16 (784)	2:22.88 (1208)	71.57 (1060)	11:47.30 (892)	4872
33	Rita Sanz-Agero	Guatemala	171 (988)	7 (568)	2:29.41 (1128)	68.38 (1116)	11:09.98 (1044)	4844
34	Angie Darby	Australia	164 (904)	12 (688)	2:35.59 (1056)	67.23 (1172)	11:21.96 (996)	4816
35	Lada Jienbalanova	Kazakhstan	170 (976)	15 (760)	2:19.13 (1252)	142.90 (748)	DNS (0)	3736
DSQ	Victoria Tereshchuk	Ukraine	178 (1072)	22 (928)	2:13.97 (1316)	70.10 (1088)	10:13.25 (1268)	5672
