= Karyakin =

Surname list

Karyakin/Kariakin (feminine: Karyakina/Kariakina) is a Russian-language surname. It may refer to:

- Aleksey Karyakin, a former leader of the unrecognized separatist Luhansk People's Republic, part of Ukraine
- Nadezhda Karyakina, Soviet athlete
- Sergey Karyakin, several persons
  - Sergey Karjakin, Ukrainian-born Russian chess grandmaster
  - Sergey Karyakin (pentathlete), Russian pentathlete, world champion (2010)
  - Sergey Karyakin (racing driver), Russian rally/racing quadricyclist, 2017 Dakar Rally champion
- Yury Karyakin (1930–2011), Russian writer, literary critic, and political activist

== See also ==
- Koryakin
