= Modern pentathlon at the 2006 Central American and Caribbean Games =

- Location: Santo Domingo, Dominican Republic
- Dates: 15-30 July

The Modern pentathlon competition at the 2006 Central American and Caribbean Games was held in Santo Domingo, Dominican Republic. The tournament was scheduled to be held from 15–30 July 2006.

== Medal summary ==
=== Men's events ===
Event	Gold		Silver		Bronze	
Individual	Oscar Soto (MEX)	5428	Yaniel Velazquez (CUB)	5412	Julio Granados (MEX)	5400
Team	Mexico; Oscar Soto; Julio Granados; Andres Garcia	5428	Cuba; Yaniel Velazquez; Frank Vicente; Abel Alvarez	5168	Dominican Republic; Jesus Abreu; Julio Benjamin; Alex Hernández	5080

=== Women's events ===
Event	Gold		Silver		Bronze	
Individual	Andrea Avena (MEX)	5316	Katia Rodriguez (CUB)	5180	Thelma Martinez (MEX)	5160
Team	Mexico; Andrea Avena; Thelma Martinez; Mahelet Jimenez	5140	Cuba; Katia Rodriguez; Suaima Garcia; Lisset Monzon	4748	Guatemala; Stephany Garza; Geraldina Garzo; Isabel Herrarte	4620

== Medal table ==
Rank	Nation	Gold	Silver	Bronze	Total
1	Mexico	4	0	2	6
2	Cuba	0	4	0	4
3	Dominican Republic	0	0	1	1
3	Guatemala	0	0	1	1
Totals (4 entries)		4	4	4	12
