= Dong-hoon =

- Hangul: 동훈
- RR: Donghun
- MR: Tonghun

Dong-hoon, also spelled Tong-hoon or Dong-hun, is a Korean given name.

- Chung Dong-hoon (born 1932), South Korean boxer
- Choi Dong-hoon (born 1971), South Korean film director
- Hoon Lee (born Tong-hoon Lee, 1973), American stage and film actor
- Haha (entertainer) (born Ha Dong-hoon, 1979), South Korean actor
- Primary (musician) (born Choi Dong-hoon, 1983), South Korean musician
- Yoon Dong-hun (born 1983), South Korean football player
- Nam Dong-hoon (born 1984), South Korean modern pentathlete
- Lee Dong-whun (born 1987), South Korean figure skater
- Han Dong-hoon (born 1973), South Korean politician

== See also ==
- List of Korean given names
