= Modern pentathlon at the 2008 Summer Olympics – Men's =

Men's modern pentathlon at the Games of the XXIX Olympiad
- Venue: Olympic Green Convention Center (shooting and fencing); Ying Tung Natatorium (swimming); Olympic Sports Center Stadium (riding and running)
- Date: 21 August
- Competitors: 36 from 22 nations
- Winning score: 5632

Medalists
1st place, gold medalist(s)		Andrey Moiseev; Russia
2nd place, silver medalist(s)		Edvinas Krungolcas; Lithuania
3rd place, bronze medalist(s)		Andrejus Zadneprovskis; Lithuania

The men's modern pentathlon at the 2008 Summer Olympics in Beijing was held on Thursday, August 21. Three venues were used: Olympic Green Convention Center (shooting and fencing), Ying Tung Natatorium (swimming), and the Olympic Sports Center Stadium (horse-riding and running).

The Russians and Lithuanians continued to dominate the men's competition for the third consecutive time. Russia's Andrey Moiseev won the gold medal, and successfully defended his Olympic title, with score of 5,632 points. Moiseev also became the second modern pentathlete to win two individual gold medals since Lars Hall of Sweden in 1952 and in 1956. Meanwhile, Lithuania's Edvinas Krungolcas and Andrejus Zadneprovskis anchored the two-medal sweep in the podium, taking the silver and bronze, respectively.

== Competition format ==
The modern pentathlon consisted of five events, with all five held in one day.

- Shooting: A 4.5 mm air pistol shooting (the athlete must hit 20 shots, one at each target). Score was based on the number of shots hitting at each target.
- Fencing: A round-robin, one-touch épée competition. Score was based on winning percentage.
- Swimming: A 200 m freestyle race. Score was based on time.
- Horse-riding: A show jumping competition. Score based on penalties for fallen bars, refusals, falls, and being over the time limit.
- Running: A 3 km run. Starts are staggered (based on points from first four events), so that the first to cross the finish line wins.

== Schedule ==
All times are China Standard Time (UTC+8)

Date	Time	Round
Thursday, 21 August 2008	08:30	Shooting
Thursday, 21 August 2008	10:00	Fencing
Thursday, 21 August 2008	14:30	Swimming
Thursday, 21 August 2008	17:00	Riding
Thursday, 21 August 2008	20:00	Running

== Results ==
Rank	Athlete	Country	Shooting Score (pts)	Fencing Victories (pts)	Swimming Time (pts)	Equestrian Time (pts)	Running Time (pts)	Total
1st place, gold medalist(s)	Andrey Moiseev	Russia	186 (1168)	26 (1024)	2:02.55 (1332)	67.70 (1060)	9:48.75 (1048)	5632
2nd place, silver medalist(s)	Edvinas Krungolcas	Lithuania	185 (1156)	21 (904)	2:07.63 (1272)	70.89 (1144)	9:42.65 (1072)	5548
3rd place, bronze medalist(s)	Andrejus Zadneprovskis	Lithuania	182 (1120)	15 (760)	2:02.27 (1336)	75.20 (1168)	9:25.00 (1140)	5524
4	Qian Zhenhua	China	189 (1204)	26 (1024)	2:07.46 (1272)	70.18 (1032)	10:04.40 (984)	5516
5	Steffen Gebhardt	Germany	183 (1132)	18 (832)	2:06.84 (1280)	82.61 (1128)	9:33.97 (1108)	5480
6	Michal Michalík	Czech Republic	188 (1192)	16 (784)	2:08.37 (1260)	69.37 (1172)	9:47.25 (1052)	5460
7	Pavlo Tymoshchenko	Ukraine	185 (1156)	22 (908)	2:09.20 (1252)	73.29 (1048)	9:42.61 (1072)	5436
8	Óscar Soto	Mexico	171 (988)	20 (880)	2:10.60 (1236)	77.32 (1160)	9:21.95 (1156)	5420
9	Dmytro Kirpulyanskyy	Ukraine	184 (1144)	20 (880)	2:04.37 (1308)	71.16 (1088)	10:01.57 (996)	5416
10	Samuel Weale	Great Britain	177 (1060)	18 (832)	2:02.87 (1328)	83.56 (1036)	9:21.18 (1156)	5412
11	Deniss Čerkovskis	Latvia	184 (1144)	15 (760)	2:10.46 (1236)	71.75 (1088)	9:29.96 (1124)	5352
12	Dzmitry Meliakh	Belarus	186 (1168)	11 (664)	2:03.03 (1324)	68.47 (1116)	9:41.97 (1076)	5348
13	Marcin Horbacz	Poland	185 (1156)	14 (736)	2:03.52 (1320)	65.46 (1088)	9:49.27 (1044)	5344
14	Nicola Benedetti	Italy	183 (1132)	16 (784)	2:15.10 (1180)	69.15 (1056)	9:18.27 (1168)	5320
15	Yaniel Velazquez	Cuba	184 (1144)	18 (832)	2:16.38 (1164)	79.79 (1028)	9:29.55 (1124)	5292
16	Eric Walther	Germany	172 (1000)	20 (880)	2:00.84 (1352)	106.18 (892)	9:19.81 (1164)	5288
17	Andrea Valentini	Italy	182 (1120)	18 (832)	2:11.70 (1220)	92.13 (972)	9:26.90 (1136)	5280
18	Sam Sacksen	United States	178 (1072)	14 (736)	2:08.99 (1256)	81.55 (1104)	9:34.25 (1104)	5272
19	Viktor Horváth	Hungary	187 (1180)	16 (784)	2:05.17 (1300)	90.55 (896)	9:33.95 (1108)	5268
20	Ilia Frolov	Russia	178 (1072)	18 (832)	2:04.01 (1312)	86.35 (828)	9:18.00 (1224)	5212
21	Bartosz Majewski	Poland	176 (1048)	18 (832)	2:09.14 (1252)	112.29 (900)	9:17.61 (1180)	5204
22	Eli Bremer	United States	165 (916)	14 (736)	2:02.80 (1328)	68.82 (1060)	9:27.46 (1132)	5172
23	Jean Maxence Berrou	France	176 (1048)	10 (640)	2:04.52 (1308)	70.64 (1060)	9:21.00 (1116)	5172
24	Joshua Riker-Fox	Canada	171 (988)	15 (760)	2:11.54 (1224)	80.36 (1092)	9:34.46 (1104)	5168
25	Nick Woodbridge	Great Britain	160 (856)	14 (736)	1:55.96 (1412)	73.22 (1060)	10:00.90 (1000)	5064
26	Gábor Balogh	Hungary	179 (1084)	19 (856)	2:07.32 (1276)	113.65 (852)	10:15.01 (940)	5008
27	Cristián Bustos	Chile	178 (1072)	12 (688)	2:15.26 (1180)	78.42 (904)	9:29.57 (1124)	4968
28	Nam Dong-Hong	South Korea	181 (1108)	15 (760)	2:05.28 (1300)	144.52 (540)	8:55.57 (1260)	4968
29	David Svoboda	Czech Republic	191 (1228)	24 (976)	2:05.40 (1296)	DNF (184)	9:24.35 (1144)	4828
30	Cao Zhongrong	China	160 (856)	21 (904)	2:01.53 (1344)	134.96 (712)	9:58.70 (1008)	4824
31	Yoshihiro Murakami	Japan	181 (1108)	12 (688)	2:10.74 (1232)	98.33 (980)	10:46.70 (776)	4784
32	Amro El-Geziry	Egypt	174 (1024)	15 (760)	1:55.86 (1412)	144.79 (484)	9:58.55 (1008)	4688
33	Lee Choon-Huan	South Korea	176 (1048)	19 (856)	2:09.18 (1252)	DNF (84)	9:41.05 (1076)	4316
34	John Zakrzewski	France	168 (952)	19 (856)	2:04.23 (1312)	DNF (160)	10:04.15 (984)	4264
35	Yahor Lapo	Belarus	178 (1072)	17 (808)	2:05.62 (1296)	DNF (0)	9:41.17 (1076)	4252
36	Jaime Lopez	Spain	183 (1132)	17 (808)	2:07.02 (1276)	DNF (0)	10:05.80 (980)	4196

== Gallery ==
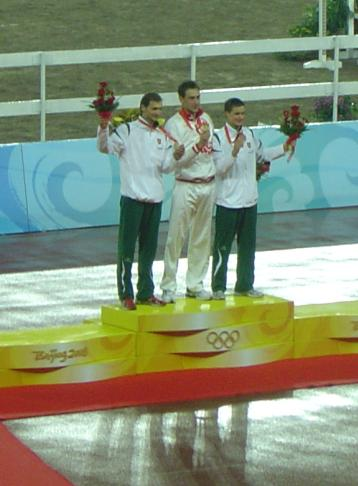
Olympic medalists
From left: Edvinas Krungolcas, Andrey Moiseev, Andrejus Zadneprovskis

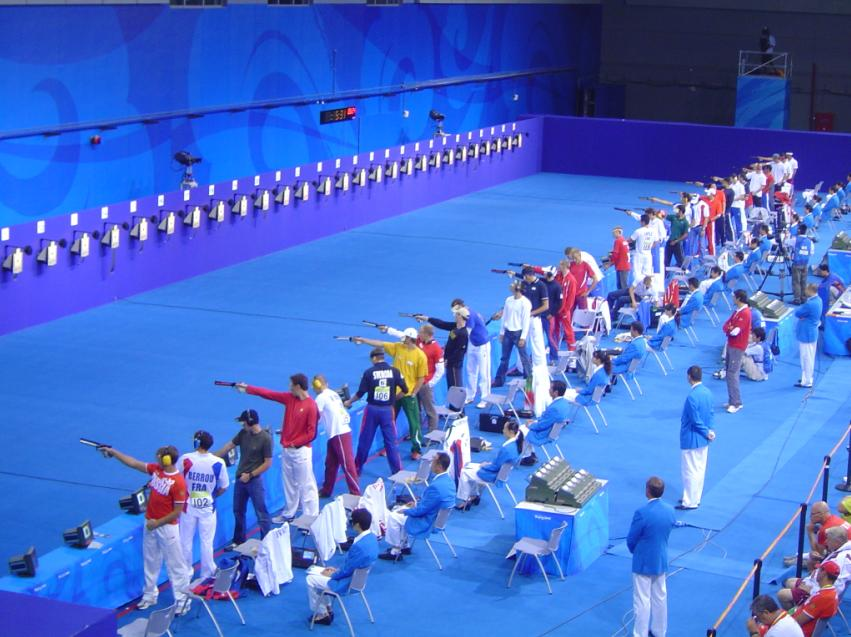
Shooting action

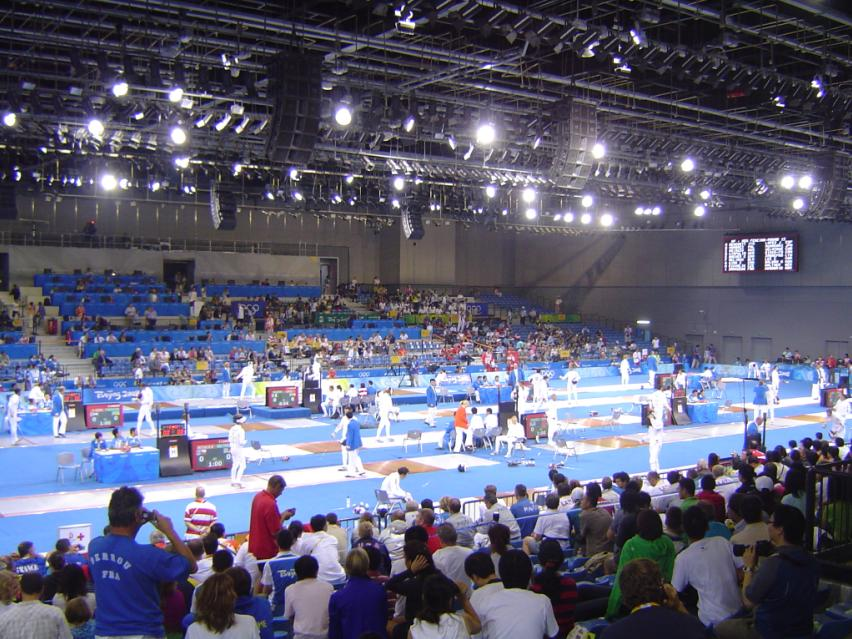
Fencing action

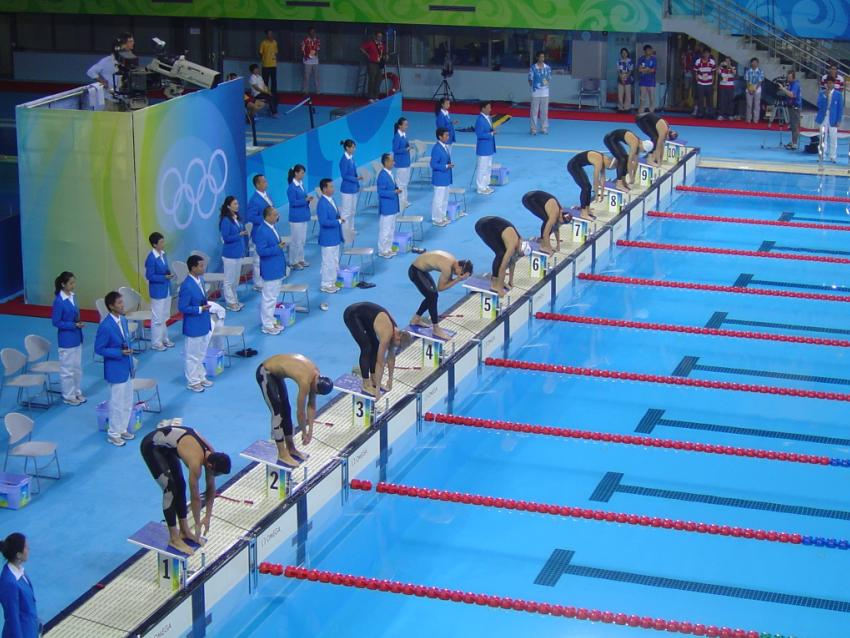
Swimming (heat 3)

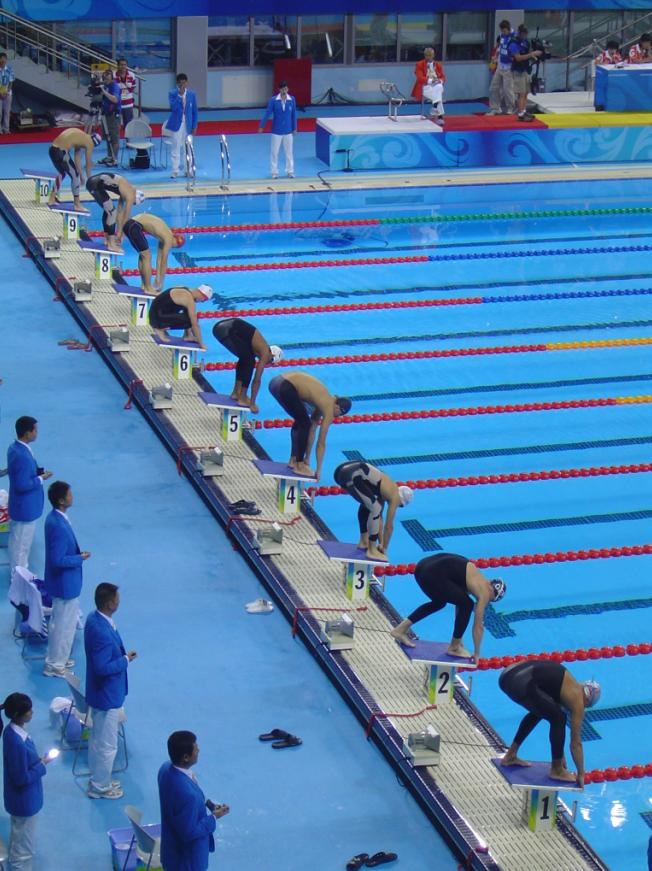
Swimming (heat 4)

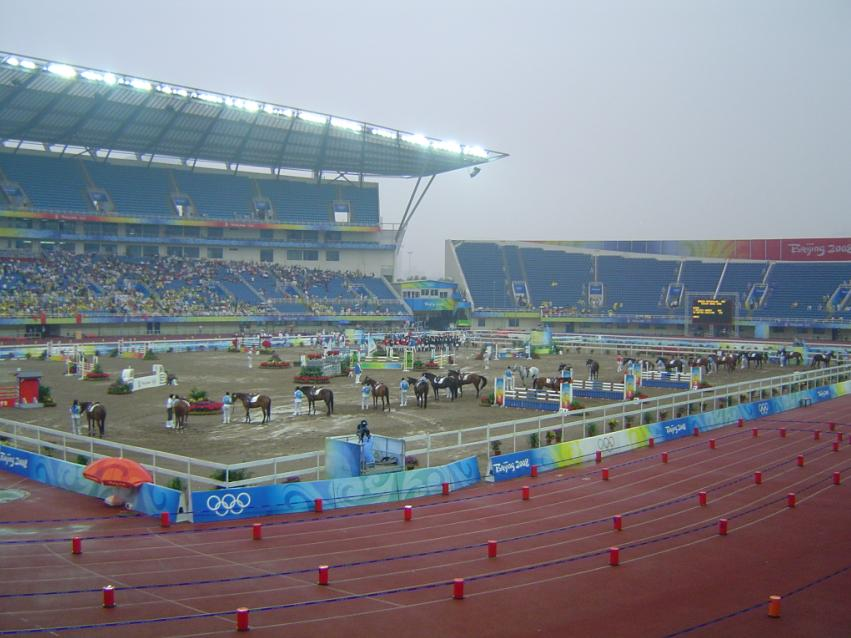
Presentation of the horses
