= Sam Sacksen =

American modern pentathlete

Personal information
- Full name: Peter Samuel Konrad Sacksen
- Nationality: United States
- Born: March 1, 1986 (age 40) Tucson, Arizona, U.S.
- Height: 6 ft 2 in (1.88 m)
- Weight: 170 lb (77 kg)

Sport
- Sport: Modern pentathlon
- Team: U.S. Olympic Training Center
- Coached by: Janusz Peciak

Peter Samuel Konrad Sacksen (born March 1, 1986) is an American modern pentathlete from Somerset, Pennsylvania. He is currently ranked no. 56 in the world by the Union Internationale de Pentathlon Moderne (UIPM).

== Career ==
Born in Tucson, Arizona, Sacksen started out his sporting career at Rockwood High School in Rockwood, Pennsylvania, where he spent four years playing for the track and field and for the swimming team. After graduating from high school, he spent one academic year at the University of Pittsburgh, before he moved to Colorado Springs, Colorado, where he worked as a resident athlete at the U.S. Olympic Training Center. He also resumed his studies in biology, and graduated with the Bachelor of Science degree in 2008. During his college years, Sacksen trained to become a modern pentathlete with a slight experience in fencing and shooting, and eventually participated in local and international competitions, including the 2007 South American Championships, where he won a silver medal.

In the 2008 season, Sacksen took part in five World Cup circuits, and achieved two top-ten finishes. He reached into the international scene by competing at the World Championships in Budapest, Hungary, but did not advance past the semifinal. Sacksen made his official debut at the 2008 Summer Olympics after receiving and accepting an invitation by UIPM, competing in the men's modern pentathlon, along with Eli Bremer. Both he and Bremer, however, struggled to attain a higher position in the early rounds of the competition, with mediocre scores in pistol shooting and a one-touch épée fencing. In the end, Sacksen finished the event in eighteenth place, with a score of 5,280 points.

After the 2008 Summer Olympics, Sacksen continued to improve his athletic performance, yet he achieved more top-ten finishes in the World Cup circuits for the individual and team-relay events. He finally attained his best result in his sporting career, when he finished sixth at the 2011 Pan American Games in Guadalajara, Mexico, which gave him an automatic qualifying berth for the next Olympics. In the same year, Sacksen also set a world shooting record for a fourth-place finish in the mixed relay event at the World Championships in Moscow, Russia.

In April 2012, Sacksen, however, suffered a ligament injury, which was completely torn in his left ankle, at a training camp in Poland. Unable to compete at the World Championships, because of a severe ankle injury, Sacksen landed to thirty-eight place, and missed out of the national team for the 2012 Summer Olympics in London, England.
