= Sabrina Crognale =

Italian modern pentathlete (born 1985)

Personal information
- Nationality: Italian
- Born: 8 August 1985 (age 40) Rome, Italy
- Height: 1.70 m (5 ft 7 in)
- Weight: 58 kg (128 lb)

Sport
- Sport: Modern pentathlon
- Club: Fiamme Oro
- Coached by: Marco Quattrini

Sabrina Crognale (born 8 August 1985) is an Italian modern pentathlete. At the 2012 Summer Olympics, she competed in the women's competition, finishing in 27th place. She also competed in two European and two World championships. She works as a police officer.
