= Yahor Lapo =

Belarusian modern pentathlete

Personal information
- Nationality: Belarus
- Born: 20 June 1982 (age 44) Minsk, Belarus
- Height: 1.82 m (5 ft 11 1/2 in)
- Weight: 77 kg (170 lb)

Sport
- Sport: Modern pentathlon
- Club: SK VS Minsk
Medal record
Men's modern pentathlon
Representing Belarus
World Championships
Gold medal – first place	2008 Budapest	Relay
Bronze medal – third place	2008 Budapest	Individual
Bronze medal – third place	2008 Budapest	Team

Yahor Lapo (Belarusian: Ягор Лапо; born June 20, 1982, in Minsk) is a modern pentathlete from Belarus. At the 2008 Summer Olympics, he competed in the men's event, along with his compatriot Dzmitry Meliakh. During the competition, he finished in penultimate place, out of thirty-six competitors.

Lapo also won an individual bronze medal at the 2008 World Modern Pentathlon Championships in Budapest, Hungary.
