= Katarzyna Wójcik =

Polish modern pentathlete

Medal record

Women's modern pentathlon

Representing Poland

European Championships
Silver medal – second place	2012 Sofia	Relay
Silver medal – second place	2013 Drzonków	Relay

Katarzyna Wójcik (born 31 March 1983) is a Polish modern pentathlete. At the 2012 Summer Olympics, she competed in the women's competition, finishing in 19th place.
