= Esteban Bustos =

Chilean modern pentathlete (born 1992)

Personal information
- Full name: Esteban Bustos Rodríguez
- Nickname: Penta 17
- Nationality: Chile
- Born: 16 December 1992 (age 33) Santiago, Chile
- Height: 1.65 m (5 ft 5 in)
- Weight: 60 kg (132 lb)

Sport
- Sport: Modern pentathlon
- Club: Pentateam (CHI)
- Coached by: Gerardo Cortes
Medal record
Men's modern pentathlon
Representing Chile
Pan American Games
Silver medal – second place	2019 Lima	Individual
Bronze medal – third place	2011 Guadalajara	Individual

Esteban Bustos Rodríguez (born December 16, 1992) is a modern pentathlete from Chile. He was born in Santiago. He won a bronze medal at the 2011 Pan American Games in Guadalajara, Mexico, and received an automatic qualifying berth for the 2012 Summer Olympics in London, following the footsteps of his brother Cristián, who had previously competed in Beijing, four years before.

Bustos was selected to be one of the thirty-six athletes to participate in the men's modern pentathlon. During the competition, Bustos performed disastrously at the initial stages, with fair scores in a one-touch épée fencing, and 200 m freestyle swimming, but maintained his pace for the tenth position in horse-riding and newly combined running and laser shooting. After completing all the segments, Bustos finished eighteenth in the men's event at his first Olympics.

He competed at the 2020 Summer Olympics.
