= John Zakrzewski =

French modern pentathlete

Personal information
- Nationality: France
- Born: 16 September 1982 (age 44) Senlis, Oise, France
- Height: 1.86 m (6 ft 1 in)
- Weight: 80 kg (176 lb)

Sport
- Sport: Modern pentathlon
- Club: Noyon Pentathlon Moderne
- Coached by: Jean-Pierre Guyomarch

John Zakrzewski (born 16 September 1982 in Senlis, Oise) is a French modern pentathlete. He is currently ranked no. 179 in the world by the Union Internationale de Pentathlon Moderne (UIPM).

Zakrzewski qualified for the 2008 Summer Olympics in Beijing, where he competed in the men's modern pentathlon, along with his teammate Jean Maxence Berrou. During the competition, Zakrzewski struggled in the early segments, with slightly fair scores in pistol shooting and a one-touch épée fencing, but he was managed to improve his performance by finishing twelfth in freestyle swimming. Zakrzewski also became one of the major highlights in this event, when he flipped off his horse Diandian on one jump, dragged along with his foot still in the stirrups, and stamped on by his mount, leaving him with bloodied face. Following his disastrous and sudden fall in riding, Zakrzewski placed thirty-fourth out of thirty-six competitors in the men's event, with a score of 4,264 points.
