= Katy Livingston =

British modern pentathlete

Medal record

Women's modern pentathlon

Representing Great Britain

World Championships
Gold medal – first place	2007 Berlin	Relay
Silver medal – second place	2006 Guatemala	Team
Silver medal – second place	2006 Guatemala	Relay
Silver medal – second place	2008 Budapest	Team
Silver medal – second place	2008 Budapest	Relay
Bronze medal – third place	2008 Budapest	Individual
Bronze medal – third place	2012 Rome	Relay

World Cup
Gold medal – first place	2008 Cairo	Individual
Silver medal – second place	2007 Moscow	Individual

European Championships
Gold medal – first place	2007 Riga	Relay
Silver medal – second place	2007 Riga	Team
Bronze medal – third place	2010 Budapest	Team

Katy Livingston (born 10 January 1984 in Guisborough, England) is a British modern pentathlete who has competed at the Olympic Games.

== Early life ==
Whilst at school she was a member of the running club, New Marske Harriers and swimming club, Saltburn and Marske, and played netball at a county level for Cleveland. Livingston trains at the University of Bath, where she completed a degree in Coach Education and Sports Development. She is a supporter of Sheffield Wednesday football club, and says that her earliest memory of major sporting event is going with her father to watch one of their matches.

== Career ==
Between 2003 and 2005 Livingston competed at three World Junior Championships, winning team gold medals in 2003, in Athens, and 2005, in Moscow and relay silver medals in 2003 and 2004. She also won team silver at the 2004 European Junior Championships.

In May 2007 she won a silver at the Moscow senior World Cup event. In June at the European Championships in Riga she finished 6th in the individual event, qualifying her for the 2008 Olympics. She also won a silver medal in the team event, with Georgina Harland and Mhairi Spence, and gold in the team relay event, with Harland and Heather Fell. These performances led to her being named the British Olympic Association’s modern pentathlon Olympic athlete of the year for 2007. However at the 2007 World Championships, in Berlin, she twice fell from her horse in the equestrian discipline, dropping from first to last place overall.

In 2008, she won a gold medal in February's World Cup event in Cairo and went to the World Championships, held in June in Budapest, winning the individual bronze medal.

At the 2008 Summer Olympics, in Beijing, Livingston finished 7th overall in the women's individual event. In the first discipline, the air pistol shooting, she scored 178 out of a possible 200, this corresponded to 1072 points and 17th place. Results of 808 points in the fencing, 1282 points in the freestyle swimming, and 1172 points in the equestrian followed, leaving her in 9th position heading into the 3000 m run. Livingston completed the run in 10 minutes 29.47, a time worth 1204 points, giving her a final total of 5548 points.

== Other work ==
In December 2011, Livingstone was one of 12 British female sporting celebrities who posed for Clara Maidment a charity calendar in aid of Wellbeing of Women, in the lingerie of Nichole de Carle, wearing jewellery by Salima Hughes and Coster Diamonds.

== See also ==
- Modern pentathlon at the 2008 Summer Olympics
- Great Britain at the 2008 Summer Olympics
