= Sergey Karyakin =

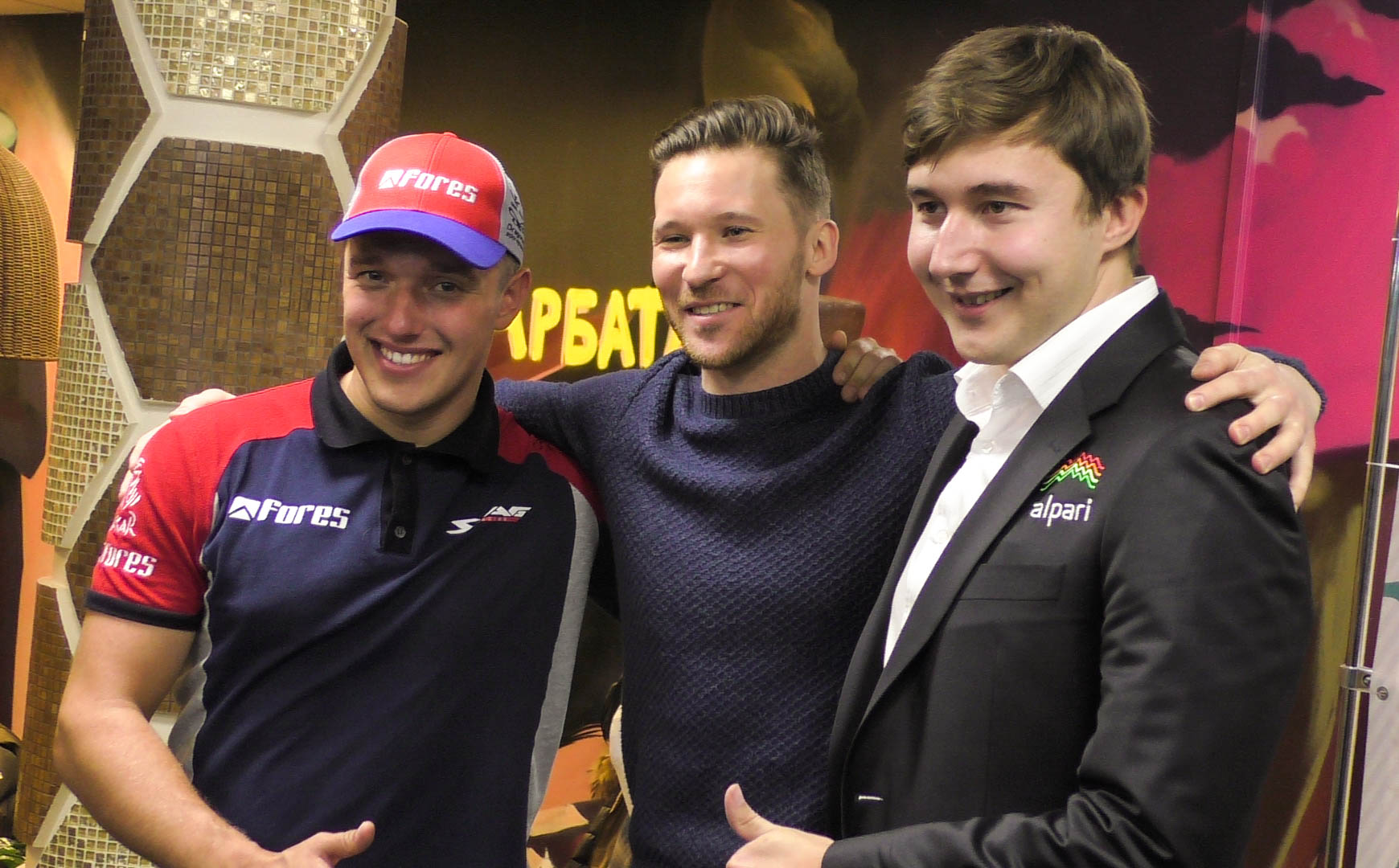
The three sportsmen named Sergey Karyakin, in 2017. From left to right: racing driver, pentathlete, chess grandmaster

Sergey Karyakin may refer to:

- Sergey Karjakin (born 1990), Russian chess grandmaster
- Sergey Karyakin (pentathlete) (born 1988), Russian modern pentathlete
- Sergey Karyakin (racing driver) (born 1991), Russian rally driver
