= Lucie Grolichová =

Czech modern pentathlete

Personal information
- Nationality: Czech Republic
- Born: 26 January 1978 (age 48) Prague, Czechoslovakia
- Height: 1.82 m (5 ft 11 1/2 in)
- Weight: 67 kg (148 lb)

Sport
- Sport: Modern pentathlon
- Club: ASC Dukla Praha
- Coached by: Jakub Kucera
Medal record
Women's modern pentathlon
Representing Czech Republic
World Championships
Gold medal – first place	2001 San Francisco	Relay
Gold medal – first place	2009 London	Relay
Bronze medal – third place	1997 Sofia	Individual
Bronze medal – third place	1997 Sofia	Team
Bronze medal – third place	2001 Milfield	Relay
Bronze medal – third place	2003 Pesaro	Relay
European Championships
Gold medal – first place	2009 Leipzich	Relay
Bronze medal – third place	2003 Usti nad Labem	Relay
World Cup
Gold medal – first place	2006 Moscow	Individual

Lucie Grolichová (born 26 January 1978 in Prague) is a Czech modern pentathlete. She is a six-time medalist (two golds and four bronzes) at the World Championships.

Grolichova qualified for the 2008 Summer Olympics in Beijing, where she competed as a lone female athlete in women's modern pentathlon. During the competition, Grolichova made a strong performance in the early rounds, with fair scores in pistol shooting and freestyle swimming, and a third-place finish in a one-touch épée fencing. She struggled to maintain her position in show jumping, when her horse Ching Ching repeatedly knocked off numerous obstacles. Grolichova finished the event with cross-country running in fifteenth place, for a total score of 5,372 points.

In 2006 Grolichova won the World Cup in Moscow. In 2009, Grolichova made her breakthrough season in the international scene, when she won two gold medals for the relay event, along with her teammates Natálie Dianová and Sylvie Cerna, at the European Championships in Leipzig, Germany, and consequently, at the World Championships in London, England.
