= 2007 African Modern Pentathlon Championship =

The 2007 African Modern Pentathlon Championship took place in Cairo, Egypt from 22 February to 25 February. It served as an Olympic qualification event. The gold medallists earned qualification to the Olympic Games.

== Women's results ==
Rank	Athlete	Nation	Shoot	Fence	Swim	Ride	Run	Total
1	Aya Medany	(Egypt) EGY	1072	1056	1296	1172	984	5580
2	Omnia Fakhry	(Egypt) EGY	928	928	1256	1200	860	5172
3	Reem El Sayed	(Egypt) EGY	940	964	1164	1160	892	5120
4	Karina Gerber	(South Africa) RSA	1024	856	1136	1172	916	5104
5	Yasmin Khaled	(Egypt) EGY	1024	748	1200	1200	832	5004
6	Tamryn Carfoot	(South Africa) RSA	664	676	948	1200	508	3996
7	Caryn Engelbrecht	(South Africa) RSA	928	676	1028	1200	164	3996
