= Belinda Schreiber =

Swiss modern pentathlete (born 1978)

Personal information
- Nationality: Switzerland
- Born: 22 May 1978 (age 48)
- Height: 1.64 m (5 ft 4 1/2 in)
- Weight: 58 kg (128 lb)

Sport
- Sport: Modern pentathlon

Belinda Schreiber (born 22 May 1978) is a Swiss modern pentathlete. She is currently ranked no. 63 in the world by the Union Internationale de Pentathlon Moderne (UIPM).

Schreiber qualified for the 2008 Summer Olympics in Beijing, where she competed as a lone female athlete in women's modern pentathlon. In the early rounds of the competition, Schreiber displayed a strong performance by topping the air pistol shooting event (AP40), with a score of 188 points. Schreiber struggled to maintain her position in the entire event, with disappointing scores in one-touch épée fencing and freestyle swimming, but quickly moved again to the top, when she placed ninth in the show jumping segment. In the end, Schreiber finished the event with cross-country running in eleventh place, for a total score of 5,464 points.
