= Iryna Khokhlova =

Ukrainian / Argentine modern pentathlete

Personal information
- Born: 29 January 1990 (age 36) Amvrosiivka, Ukrainian SSR, Soviet Union
- Height: 1.67 m (5 ft 6 in) (2012)
- Weight: 61 kg (134 lb; 9.6 st) (2012)

Sport
- Country: Ukraine (until 2014); Argentina (since 2014)
- Sport: Modern pentathlon
Medal record
Women's modern pentathlon
Representing Ukraine
World Championships
Gold medal – first place	2013 Kaoshiung	Relay
Bronze medal – third place	2013 Kaoshiung	Mixed relay
European Championships
Silver medal – second place	2012 Sofia	Individual
Silver medal – second place	2013 Drzonków	Team
Representing Argentina
Pan American Championships
Silver medal – second place	2016 Buenos Aires	Individual
South American Championships
Bronze medal – third place	2015 Resende	Individual
- Updated on 7 July 2016

Iryna Khokhlova is a Ukrainian (until 2014) and Argentine (since 2014) modern pentathlete. Khokhlova was born on 29 January 1990.

== Career ==
At the 2012 Summer Olympics, she competed in the women's competition, finishing in 10th place.

She moved to Argentina in 2014. In 2014, she married pentathlete Emmanuel Zapata from Argentina.

She competed for Argentina in the World Cup Series #2 in Cairo in 2015 and at the 2016 Summer Olympics, finishing in 27th place.
