= Marlene Sánchez =

Mexican modern pentathlete (born 1991)

Personal information
- Full name: Karla Marlene Sánchez Rodríguez
- Nationality: Mexico
- Born: 27 October 1991 (age 34) Guadalajara, Jalisco, Mexico
- Height: 1.60 m (5 ft 3 in)
- Weight: 51 kg (112 lb)

Sport
- Sport: Modern pentathlon

Karla Marlene Sánchez Rodríguez (born October 27, 1991, in Guadalajara, Jalisco) is a Mexican modern pentathlete. She is currently ranked no. 82 in the world by the Union Internationale de Pentathlon Moderne (UIPM).

Sanchez qualified for the 2008 Summer Olympics in Beijing, where she competed as a lone female athlete in women's modern pentathlon. In the early rounds of the competition, Sanchez displayed her strong performance by attaining a fourth-place finish in the air pistol shooting event (AP40), with a score of 186 points. She placed eighteenth in one-touch épée fencing, with a total of seventeen victories and eighteen losses, but dropped to a lower position in freestyle swimming and show jumping segments. Following her poor performance in the final rounds, Sanchez finished the event with cross-country running in twenty-eighth place, for a total score of 5,156 points.
