= Yun Cho-rong =

South Korean modern pentathlete

Yun Cho-Rong
Personal information
- Nationality: South Korea
- Born: 1 September 1989 (age 36) Chuncheon, Gangwon, South; Korea
- Height: 1.61 m (5 ft 3 1/2 in)
- Weight: 55 kg (121 lb)

Sport
- Sport: Modern pentathlon
- Coached by: Kang Kyung-Hyo

Yun Cho-Rong (Korean: 윤초롱; born September 1, 1989, in Chuncheon, Gangwon) is a South Korean modern pentathlete. She also won a gold medal for the women's individual event at the 2006 Asian Modern Pentathlon Championships in Kaohsiung, Taiwan.

Yun qualified for the 2008 Summer Olympics in Beijing, where she competed as a lone female athlete in the women's modern pentathlon. During the competition, Yun struggled in the early segments, with poor scores in pistol shooting and a one-touch épée fencing, but managed to attain twenty-fourth-place finishes in freestyle swimming and show jumping. In the end, Yun finished the event with cross-country running in thirty-third place, for a total score of 4,872 points.
