= Natalie Dianová =

Czech modern pentathlete

Personal information
- Born: January 1, 1989 (age 37)
Medal record
Women's modern pentathlon
Representing Czech Republic
World Championships
Gold medal – first place	2009 London	Relay
European Championships
Gold medal – first place	2009 Leipzig	Relay
Bronze medal – third place	2012 Sofia	Mixed Relay
- Updated on 14 August 2012

Natalie Dianová (Czech pronunciation: [ˈnataːlɪjɛ ˈdɪjanovaː]; born 1 January 1989 in Valašské Meziříčí) is a Czech modern pentathlete. At the 2012 Summer Olympics, she competed in the women's competition, finishing in 22nd place. On 17 June 2023, she married Jan Železný Jr. They share 2 children: Sara and Jan Železný III.
