= Bartosz Majewski =

Polish modern pentathlete

Personal information
- Nationality: Poland
- Born: 8 April 1987 (age 39) Zielona Góra, Poland
- Height: 1.79 m (5 ft 10 1/2 in)
- Weight: 72 kg (159 lb)

Sport
- Sport: Modern pentathlon
- Club: ZKS Drzonków Zielona Góra
- Coached by: Stanislaw Pytel

Bartosz Majewski (born April 8, 1987, in Zielona Góra) is a Polish modern pentathlete. He won a silver medal for the relay at the 2010 European Championships in Debrecen, Hungary, and is currently ranked no. 63 in the world by the Union Internationale de Pentathlon Moderne (UIPM).

Majewski qualified for the 2008 Summer Olympics in Beijing, where he competed in the men's modern pentathlon, along with his teammate Marcin Horbacz. Majewski struggled to attain a higher position in the early rounds, with disappointing scores in pistol shooting and freestyle swimming, but managed to display a strong performance in one-touch épée fencing and 3 km cross country running, where he finished the race in fourth place. Majewski's best result in the last round, however, was insufficiently enough to reach the top position, finishing only in twenty-first place with a score of 5,204 points.
