= Marcin Horbacz =

Polish modern pentathlete

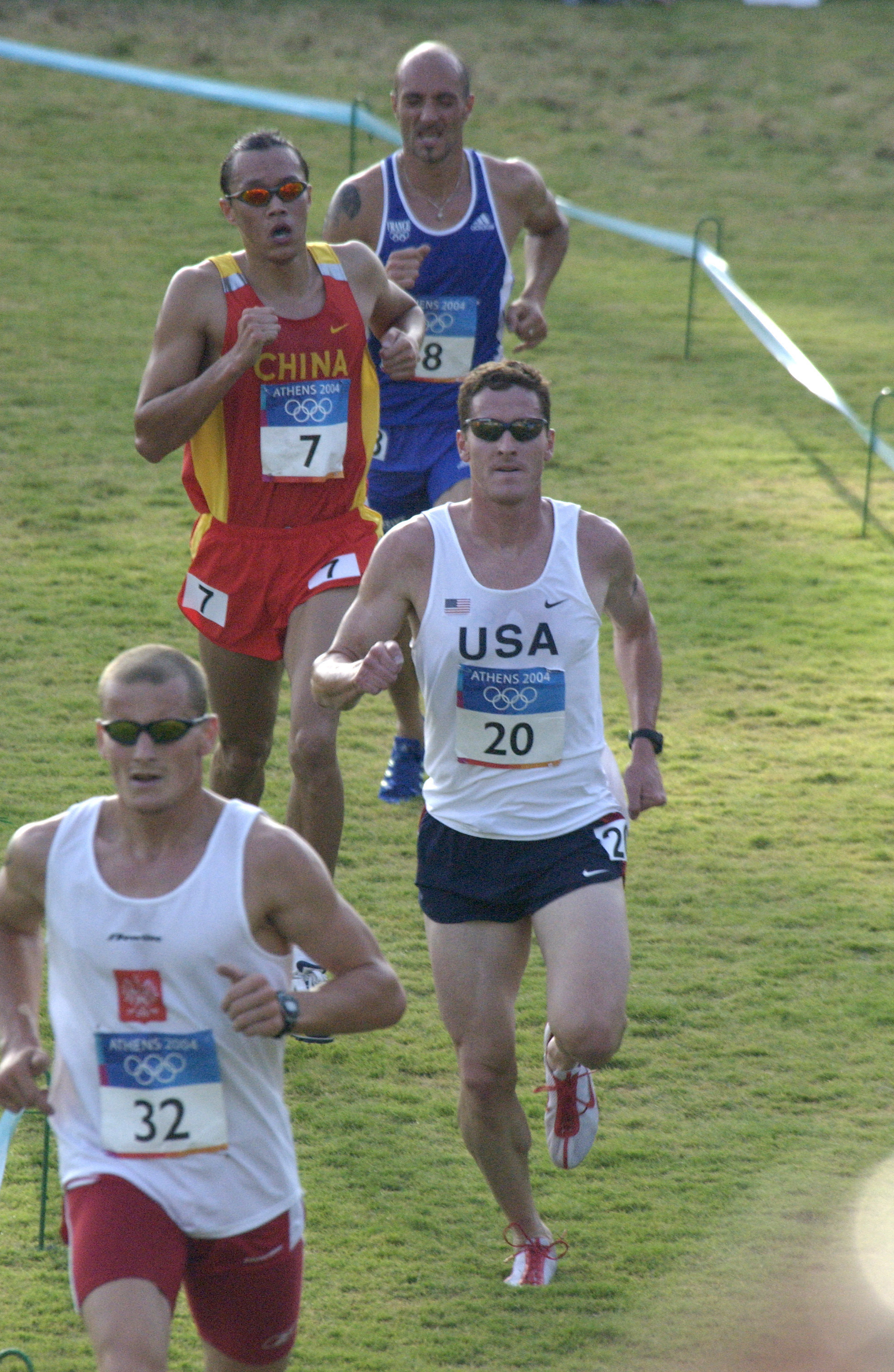
- Marcin Horbacz (no. 32) during the men's pentathlon at the 2004 Summer Olympics

Personal information
- Nationality: Poland
- Born: 16 June 1974 (age 52) Koszalin, Poland
- Height: 1.80 m (5 ft 11 in)
- Weight: 73 kg (161 lb)

Sport
- Sport: Modern pentathlon
- Club: ZKS Drzonków Zielona Góra
- Coached by: Stanislaw Pytel

Marcin Horbacz (born June 16, 1974 in Koszalin) is a Polish modern pentathlete. He is also a two-time champion at the 2007 and 2009 World Cup circuit, and is currently ranked no. 106 in the world by the Union Internationale de Pentathlon Moderne (UIPM).

Horbacz first competed for the men's modern pentathlon at the 2004 Summer Olympics in Athens. He displayed a strong performance in the early rounds of the competition, including his sixth place-finish in one-touch épée fencing. He was second overall at the start of the show jumping segment, but dropped to last when his horse stubbornly refused to jump the last obstacle. Following a discontinuous jump, Horbacz finished last out of thirty-two competitors in the overall event, with a score of 4,388 points.

At the 2008 Summer Olympics in Beijing, Horbacz qualified as a 34-year-old for the second time in men's modern pentathlon, along with his teammate Bartosz Majewski. During the competition, Horbacz made a strong showing in the pistol shooting segment by hitting a total of 185 targets. Unlike his previous Olympics, he struggled to maintain his position in épée fencing and freestyle swimming, but managed to improve his performance by lessening obstacle and time penalties in the riding segment. In the end, Horbacz successfully finished the event in thirteenth place with a score of 5,344 points.
