= Xiu Xiu (pentathlete) =

Chinese modern pentathlete

Xiu Xiu (Chinese: 修秀; pinyin: Xiū Xiù; born 4 December 1987 in Luoyang, Henan) is a Chinese modern pentathlete who finished 10th in this event at the 2008 Summer Olympics in Beijing.

Her personal best at the World Championships is 5th at the 2007 World Championships. She also won the Korean Open & Asian Championships in 2009.
