= Ádám Marosi =

Hungarian modern pentathlete

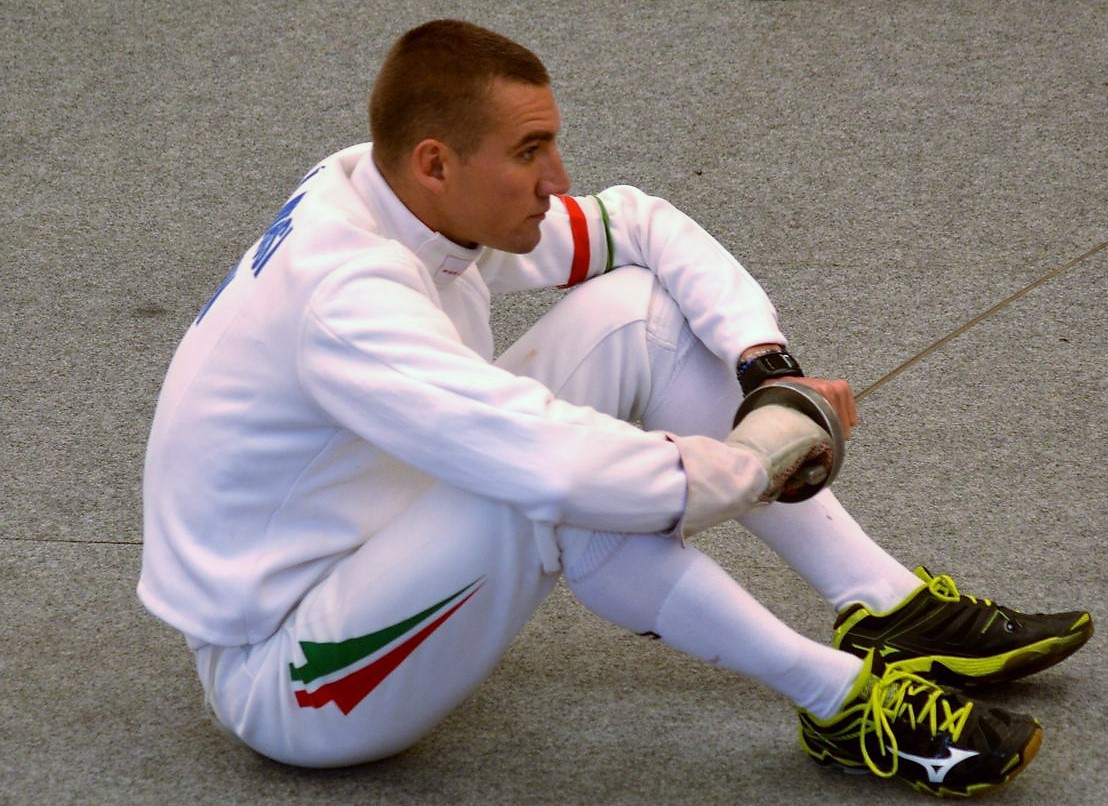

Personal information
- Born: 26 July 1984 (age 42) Budapest, Hungary
- Height: 1.81 m (5 ft 11 1/2 in)
- Weight: 75 kg (165 lb)

Sport
- Country: Hungary
- Sport: Modern Pentathlon
Medal record
Men's modern pentathlon
Representing Hungary
Olympic Games
Bronze medal – third place	2012 London	Individual
World Championships
Gold medal – first place	2009 London	Individual
Gold medal – first place	2009 London	Team
Gold medal – first place	2011 Moscow	Relay
Gold medal – first place	2013 Kaohsiung	Relay
Gold medal – first place	2014 Warsaw	Team
Gold medal – first place	2021 Cairo	Individual
Gold medal – first place	2021 Cairo	Team
Silver medal – second place	2011 Moscow	Team
Silver medal – second place	2019 Budapest	Team
Bronze medal – third place	2008 Budapest	Relay
Bronze medal – third place	2010 Chengdu	Team
Bronze medal – third place	2011 Moscow	Individual
European Championships
Gold medal – first place	2004 Albena	Relay
Gold medal – first place	2010 Debrecen	Relay
Gold medal – first place	2011 Medway	Relay
Gold medal – first place	2013 Drzonków	Individual
Gold medal – first place	2013 Drzonków	Team
Gold medal – first place	2017 Minsk	Team
Silver medal – second place	2008 Moscow	Team
Silver medal – second place	2009 Lipsk	Relay
Silver medal – second place	2012 Sofia	Team
Silver medal – second place	2018 Székesfehérvár	Individual
Silver medal – second place	2018 Székesfehérvár	Team
Bronze medal – third place	2008 Moscow	Relay
Bronze medal – third place	2009 Lipsk	Individual
- Updated on 11 August 2012

Ádám Marosi (born 26 July 1984) is a Hungarian Modern pentathlete.

== Career ==
Marosi won the 2009 World Modern Pentathlon Championships in London. He also won the gold at the Modern Pentathlon World Cup 2010 held in Medway, GB. He competed in the 2012 Summer Olympics where he won the bronze medal.
