= 2008 World Modern Pentathlon Championships =

World morden penthathlon

2008 World Championships
- Location: Budapest, Hungary
- Dates: 29 May–3 June

The 2008 World Modern Pentathlon Championships were held in Budapest, Hungary from May 29 to June 3. It was the last Olympic qualification event in modern pentathlon before the 2008 Summer Olympics in Beijing.

== Medal summary ==
=== Men's events ===
Event	(gold) Gold	(silver) Silver	(bronze) Bronze
Individual	Ilya Frolov (RUS)	David Svoboda (CZE)	Yahor Lapo (BLR)
Team	Russia; Ilya Frolov; Andrey Moiseyev; Aleksey Turkin	Ukraine; Dmytro Kirpulyanskyy; Pavlo Tymoshchenko; Yevgeniy Borkin	Belarus; Yahor Lapo; Mikhail Prokopenko; Dzmitry Meliakh
Relay	Belarus; Yahor Lapo; Mikhail Prokopenko; Dzmitry Meliakh	Lithuania; Justinas Kinderis; Edvinas Krungolcas; Andrejus Zadneprovskis	Hungary; Ádám Marosi; Róbert Németh; Péter Tibolya

=== Women's events ===
Event	(gold) Gold	(silver) Silver	(bronze) Bronze
Individual	Amélie Cazé (FRA)	Aya Medany (EGY)	Katie Livingston (GBR)
Team	Poland; Sylwia Czwojdzińska; Paulina Boenisz; Edita Maloszyc	Great Britain; Heather Fell; Mhairi Spence; Katie Livingston	Hungary; Sarolta Kovács; Adrienn Tóth; Leila Gyenesei
Relay	Hungary; Sarolta Kovács; Adrienn Tóth; Leila Gyenesei	Great Britain; Heather Fell; Mhairi Spence; Katie Livingston	Poland; Sylwia Czwojdzińska; Paulina Boenisz; Edita Maloszyc

== See also ==
- Modern Pentathlon at the 2008 Summer Olympics
- World Modern Pentathlon Championship
- Article in Hungarian with detailed results
- World Modern Pentathlon Championship Official Site
