= Andrei Gheorghe =

Guatemalan modern pentathlete

Personal information
- Nationality: Guatemalan
- Born: Gheorghe Andrei Dan; 14 September 1987 (age 38) Bucharest, Romania

Sport
- Sport: Modern pentathlon
- Coached by: Gheorghe Marian Viorel (father)

Achievements and titles
- Olympic finals: London 2012
Medal record
Men's modern pentathlon
Representing Guatemala
Pan American Games
Silver medal – second place	2011 Guadalajara	Individual

Andrei Gheorghe (born 14 September 1987) is a Romanian-born Guatemalan modern pentathlete. He competed at the 2012 Summer Olympics.
