= Jean Maxence Berrou =

French modern pentathlete (born 1985)

Personal information
- Nationality: France
- Born: 5 September 1985 (age 40) Quimper, Finistère, France
- Height: 1.73 m (5 ft 8 in)
- Weight: 70 kg (154 lb)

Sport
- Sport: Modern pentathlon
- Club: Lagardère Paris Racing
- Coached by: Jean-Pierre Guyomarch

Jean Maxence Berrou (born 5 September 1985 in Quimper, Finistère) is a French modern pentathlete. He is also a two-time champion at World Cup circuits, two-time silver medalist at the European Junior Championships, and is currently ranked no. 26 in the world by the Union Internationale de Pentathlon Moderne (UIPM).

Berrou qualified for the 2008 Summer Olympics in Beijing, where he competed in the men's modern pentathlon, along with his teammate John Zakrzewski. During the competition, Berrou struggled in the early segments, with poor scores in pistol shooting and a one-touch épée fencing, but he was managed to improve his performance in the final rounds, including his thirteenth-place finish for the show jumping. Berrou's best result in the last round was insufficiently enough to reach the top position, finishing only in twenty-third place with a score of 5,172 points.

Berrou also sought to compete for his second Olympic games in London. After the Polish team withdrew their athlete Lukasz Klekot because of a doping issue, Berrou had been initially told by UIPM to take the final spot for the men's event. Few days before the Olympics, the UIPM had changed its opinion, and informed that the vacant position should be attributed to Ireland's Arthur Lanigan O'Keeffe. The Court of Arbitration for Sport (CAS), on the other hand, rejected Berrou's appeal against the federation's selection procedure.
