= Eli Bremer =

American modern pentathlete and politician

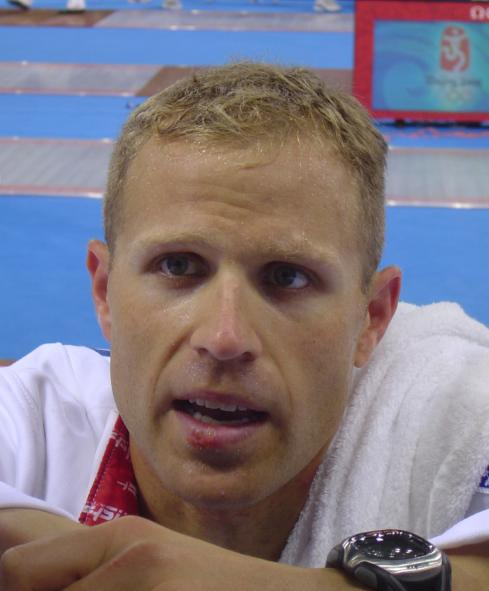

Chair of the El Paso County Republican Party
- In office 2011–2013

Personal details
- Born: Robert Eli Bremer; May 31, 1978 (age 48) Hancock, New Hampshire, U.S.
- Party: Republican
- Relatives: Paul Bremer (uncle)
- Education: United States Air Force Academy (BS)

Military service
- Allegiance: United States
- Branch/service: United States Air Force
- Rank: Major
- Unit: Air Force Reserves
- Sports career
- Country: United States
- Sport: Modern pentathlon
Medal record
Pan American Games
Gold medal – first place	2007 Rio de Janeiro	Men's Individual

Robert Eli Bremer (born May 31, 1978) is an American modern pentathlete and politician who competed for the United States at the 2008 Summer Olympics in Beijing, China. He finished 22nd overall in the modern pentathlon event.

== Early life and education ==
Bremer was born in Hancock, New Hampshire, and grew up in Colorado Springs, Colorado. He earned a Bachelor of Science degree from the United States Air Force Academy.

== Career ==
Bremer is a major in the Air Force Reserve Command. He was a regional finalist in the 2008 White House Fellows Program. He also worked as a commentator for NBC at the Olympic Games in 2004 and 2012.

In 2011, Bremer co-founded Socon Media with business partner Mike Lindley. Bremer served as the chair of the El Paso County Republican Party from 2011 to 2013.

=== 2022 U.S. Senate election in Colorado ===
On August 10, 2021, Bremer announced that he would be running for the United States Senate in the 2022 election as a Republican. He was endorsed by former senator, Olympian and Air Force veteran Ben Nighthorse Campbell. He was eliminated at the Colorado Republican Party convention after failing to receive the required minimum of 30% of the delegate vote.

While Bremer has acknowledged that Joe Biden is president, he has questioned the validity of the 2020 presidential election results, saying "Looking at the election results there were a lot of anomalies, and that’s just a mathematical fact."

== Personal life ==
Bremer is the nephew of diplomat Paul Bremer. He is married to Camille "Cami" Grebel-Bremer.

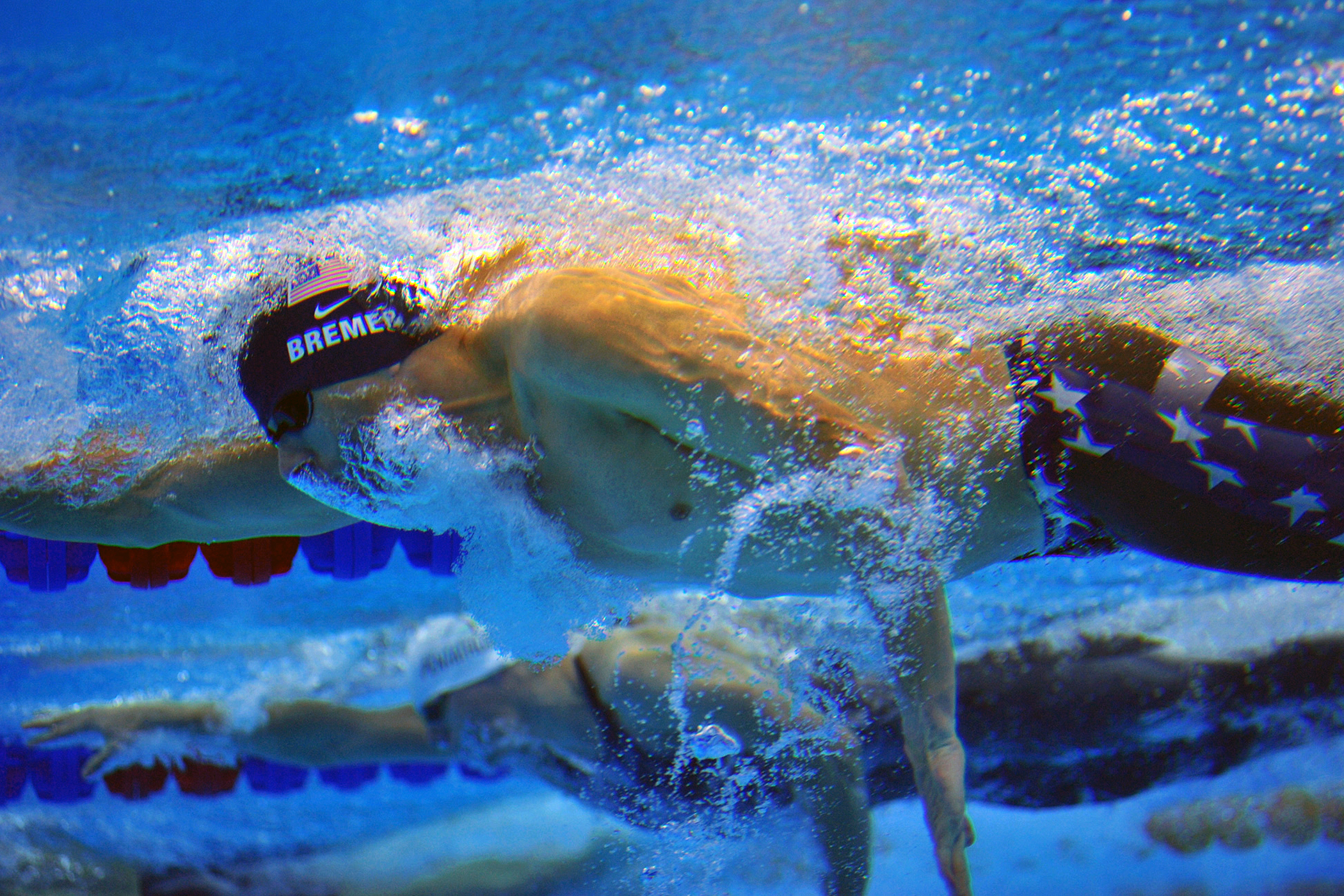
Eli Bremer in the 200 m freestyle portion of the pentathlon
