= Cristián Bustos (pentathlete) =

Chilean modern pentathlete (born 1983)

Personal information
- Born: 16 July 1983 (age 41); Valparaíso, Chile

Sport
- Sport: Modern pentathlon

Cristián Bustos (born 16 July 1983) is a Chilean modern pentathlete. He competed in the men's individual event at the 2008 Summer Olympics.
