= Modern pentathlon at the Pan American Games =

- No. of events: 5 (men: 2; women: 2; mixed: 1)

Modern pentathlon events have been contested since the first Pan American Games in 1951, in every edition except between 1967 and 1983, and 1991 and 1995.

== Events ==
Event	51	55	59	63	87	99	03	07	11	15	19	23	Years
Men's individual	•	•	•	•	•	•	•	•	•	•	•	•	12
Men's team	•	•	•	•									4
Men's relay											•	•	2
Women's individual						•	•	•	•	•	•	•	7
Women's relay											•	•	2
Mixed relay											•	•	2
Total Events	2	2	2	2	1	2	2	2	2	2	5	5	

== Medal table ==
Updated after the 2023 Pan American Games.

Rank	Nation	Gold	Silver	Bronze	Total
1	United States	13	10	7	30
2	Mexico	10	5	7	22
3	Brazil	4	5	1	10
4	Guatemala	2	1	1	4
5	Cuba	0	3	1	4
6	Canada	0	2	3	5
7	Chile	0	1	2	3
7	Ecuador	0	1	2	3
9	Independent Athletes Team	0	1	1	2
10	Argentina	0	0	4	4
Totals (10 entries)		29	29	29	87
