= Modern pentathlon at the 2011 Pan American Games =

- Venue: Hipica Club
- Dates: October 15 – October 16
- Competitors: 42 from 13 nations

Modern pentathlon competitions at the 2011 Pan American Games in Guadalajara was held from October 15 to October 16 at the Hipica Club. The sport became the first sport to be completed out of the 36 sports on the program.

== Medal summary ==
=== Medal table ===
Rank	Nation	Gold	Silver	Bronze	Total
1	Mexico	1	0	1	2
2	United States	1	0	0	1
3	Brazil	0	1	0	1
3	Guatemala	0	1	0	1
5	Chile	0	0	1	1
Totals (5 entries)		2	2	2	6

=== Events ===
Event	Gold	Silver	Bronze
Men's	Oscar Soto; Mexico	Andrei Gheorghe; Guatemala	Esteban Bustos; Chile
Women's	Margaux Isaksen; United States	Yane Marques; Brazil	Tamara Vega; Mexico

== Schedule ==
All times are Central Daylight Time (UTC-5).

Day	Date	Start	Finish	Event	Phase
Day 2	Saturday October 15, 2011	9:00	17:30	Women's individual	Finals
Day 3	Sunday October 16, 2011	9:00	17:30	Men's individual	Finals

== Qualification ==
There is a quota of 40 athletes (24 male, 16 female) (however one spot over quota for each gender was allowed); Mexico as the host country is guaranteed a full team of four athletes (two men and two women). Qualification is done on a country basis, not an individual basis.

Nation	Men	Women	Total
Argentina	2	2	4
Brazil	2	2	4
Canada	2	2	4
Chile	2	1	3
Cuba	2	2	4
Dominican Republic	2		2
Ecuador	2	1	3
Guatemala	2	2	4
Mexico	2	2	4
Panama	2		2
United States	2	2	4
Uruguay	1		1
Venezuela	2	1	3
Total athletes	25	17	42
Total NOCs	13	10	13
