= Nam Dong-hoon =

South Korean modern pentathlete

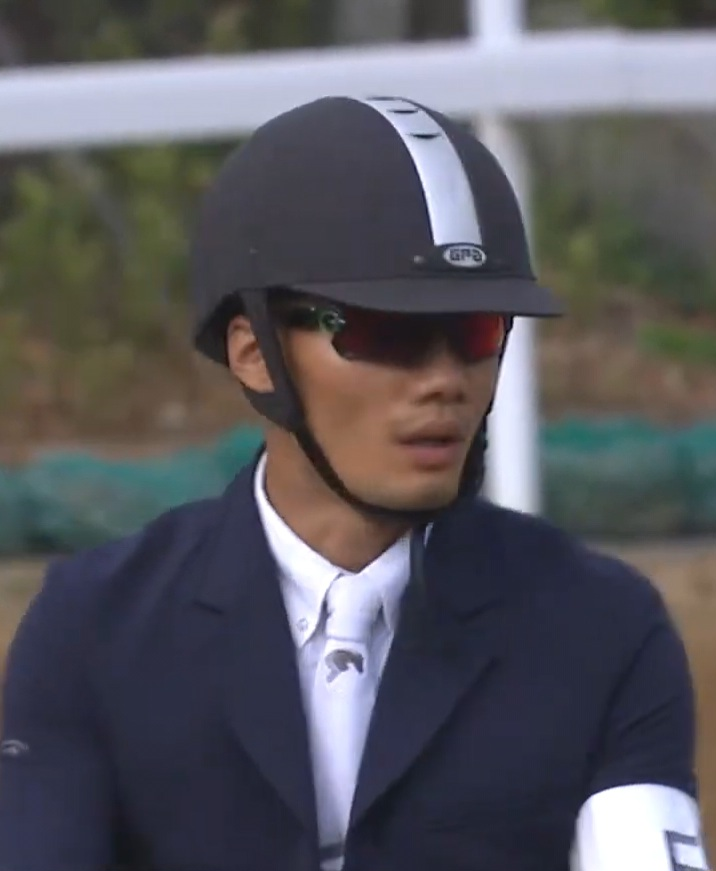

Personal information
- Nationality: South Korea
- Born: 1 May 1984 (age 42) Daegu, South Korea
- Height: 1.73 m (5 ft 8 in)
- Weight: 70 kg (154 lb)

Korean name
- Hangul: 남동훈
- RR: Nam Donghun
- MR: Nam Tonghun

Sport
- Sport: Modern pentathlon
- Club: Korean Armed Forces
- Coached by: Kang Kyung-Hyo

Nam Dong-hoon (Korean: 남동훈; born May 1, 1984, in Daegu) is a South Korean modern pentathlete. He is also a silver medalist at the 2008 Korean Open & Asian Championships in Seoul, and is currently ranked no. 123 in the world by the Union Internationale de Pentathlon Moderne (UIPM).

Nam qualified for the 2008 Summer Olympics in Beijing, where he competed in the men's modern pentathlon, along with his teammate Lee Choon-Huan. During the competition, Nam struggled in the early segments, with poor scores in pistol shooting and a one-touch épée fencing. He managed to attain a sixteenth-place finish in freestyle swimming, but displayed a weak performance in the riding segment, when he completed the show jumping course in thirtieth place, and incurred a total of 380 penalties (both obstacle and time). In the cross-country running segment, Nam finished the 3 km race, with a fastest time and an Olympic record of 8:55.57. Nam's best result in the last round, however, was insufficiently enough to reach the top position, finishing only in twenty-eighth place with a score of 4,968 points.
