= Dmytro Kirpulyanskyy =

Ukrainian modern pentathlete

Personal information
- Nickname: Dimo
- Nationality: Ukraine
- Born: 2 June 1985 (age 41) Makiivka, Ukrainian SSR, Soviet Union
- Height: 1.88 m (6 ft 2 in)
- Weight: 76 kg (168 lb)

Sport
- Sport: Modern pentathlon
- Club: Dynamo Donetsk (UKR)
- Coached by: Konstantin Kirpulyanskyy
Medal record
Men's modern pentathlon
Representing Ukraine
World Championships
Silver medal – second place	2008 Budapest	Team
Bronze medal – third place	2009 London	Individual
Bronze medal – third place	2015 Berlin	Team
European Championships
Silver medal – second place	2008 Budapest	Team
Bronze medal – third place	2011 Medway	Individual

Dmytro Kostiantynovych Kirpulyanskyy (Ukrainian: Дмитро Костянтинович Кірпулянський; born June 2, 1985, in Makiivka) is a two-time Olympic modern pentathlete from Ukraine. He also won an individual bronze medal at the 2009 World Modern Pentathlon Championships in London, England.

== Career ==
Kirpulyanskyy achieved his best results and performed consistently for the men's event at the Olympics, when he finished ninth in 2008. At the 2012 Summer Olympics in London, however, he slapped his horse Wonderboy after the horse almost threw him, and then fell off him during the horse-riding segment. Following his sudden fall and unsuccessful attempt to finish the riding course, Kirpulyanskyy dropped to thirty-fifth place in the overall standings.

Kirpulyanskyy works as a doctor with a degree in medicine at the Donetsk National Medical University. He is a member of Dynamo Donetsk, currently coached Konstantin.
