= Heather Fell =

British modern pentathlete and triathlete

Medal record

Women's modern pentathlon

Representing Great Britain

Olympic Games
Silver medal – second place	2008 Beijing	Individual

World Championships
Gold medal – first place	2012 Rome	Team
Silver medal – second place	2008 Budapest	Team
Silver medal – second place	2008 Budapest	Relay
Silver medal – second place	2009 London	Team
Silver medal – second place	2010 Chengdu	Team

World Cup
Gold medal – first place	2008 Millfield	Individual
Bronze medal – third place	2007 Moscow	Individual
Bronze medal – third place	2008 Kladno	Individual

European Championships
Gold medal – first place	2007 Riga	Relay
Silver medal – second place	2007 Riga	Individual
Silver medal – second place	2009 Leipzig	Individual
Silver medal – second place	2012 Sofia	Team
Bronze medal – third place	2010 Debrecen	Team
Bronze medal – third place	2012 Sofia	Relay

Women's Triathlon

Representing Great Britain

35-39F European Sprint Triathlon Championships
Gold medal – first place	2018 Glasgow	Individual

Heather Fell (born 3 March 1983 in Plymouth, England) is a former British modern pentathlete turned triathlete. She competed at the 2008 Summer Olympics, winning the silver medal in the women's modern pentathlon event.

== Early life ==
Fell grew up in Tavistock, Devon, where she was taught to ride and shoot, both disciplines in the pentathlon, by the parents of the 2000 Olympic pentathlon bronze medallist Kate Allenby. Heather has a degree in physiotherapy from Brunel University.

== Career ==
After initial success at junior level, including two gold and one silver medal in the 2003 World Junior Championships in Athens, Fell nearly gave up the sport in 2006 when, due to a series of shin splint injuries, her funding was cut by UK Sport. She described this as giving her "the kick up the arse I needed", and, forced to stop training at the University of Bath's facilities due to the cost of living in the city, she moved back home with her parents, funding her continued training with three part-time jobs; as a swimming coach, a barmaid and a physiotherapist. Her funding was not restored until she qualified for the Olympics.

2007 brought her first medal success in a World Cup event, with bronze in Moscow. Fell won an individual silver medal at the 2007 European Championships in Riga, reaching the Olympic qualifying standard in doing so. She also won a gold medal as part of the relay team, with Katy Livingston and Georgina Harland.

In 2008 Fell won medals at two events on the World Cup circuit, gold at Millfield and bronze in Kladno. In Kladno she went into the final discipline, the run, in 5th place, but moved up two positions with a personal best, she had also set a PB in the swimming. At the World Championships, in Budapest, she finished just outside the medals in 4th place in the individual event but picked up silver medals as a member of the squads in team event, with Georgina Harland and Mhairi Spence, and team relay event, with Katy Livingston and Spence.

=== 2008 Olympic Games ===
At the 2008 Summer Olympics, in Beijing, Fell won the silver medal in the women's individual event, behind Lena Schöneborn of Germany. In the first discipline, the air pistol shooting, she scored 185 out of a possible 200, this corresponded to 1156 points and 6th place. Results of 880 points in the fencing, 1328 points in the freestyle swimming, and 1144 points in the show jumping followed, leaving her in 2nd position, with a 19-second deficit on leader Schöneborn, heading into the 3000 m run. Fell completed the run in 10 minutes 19.24 seconds, a time worth 1244 points, giving her a final total of 5752 points. Despite closing the gap on Schöneborn by 9 seconds she was unable to catch her and take victory. She said after the medal ceremony, "It's pretty obvious that I don't regret deciding to stick with it."

=== Triathlon ===
In January 2014 Fell announced her retirement to pursue a career in media. She took up ironman triathlon and came second in the 30-34 women's category at the 2017 Standard Bank African Championship - qualifying for Kona in her first ironman distance race. She subsequently finished 36th in her age category at the 2017 Ironman World Championship As of late 2017 Heather has been co-presenting content on the Global Triathlon Network YouTube channel. In 2018 Heather became European Sprint Triathlon Champion in the 35-39 women's age category at the 2018 European Championships in Glasgow.

== See also ==
- Modern pentathlon at the 2008 Summer Olympics
- Great Britain at the 2008 Summer Olympics
