= Yaniel Velázquez =

Cuban modern pentathlete (born 1987)

Personal information
- Full name: Yaniel Velázquez Garcia
- Nationality: Cuba
- Born: 12 July 1987 (age 38) Havana, Cuba
- Height: 1.71 m (5 ft 7 1/2 in)
- Weight: 67 kg (148 lb)

Sport
- Sport: Modern pentathlon
- Coached by: Alejandro Guarch, Wilfredo Moreno Matos
Medal record
Men's modern pentathlon
Representing Cuba
Pan American Games
Silver medal – second place	2007 Rio de Janeiro	Individual

Yaniel Velázquez Garcia (born 12 July 1987 in Havana) is a Cuban modern pentathlete. He won a silver medal for the men's event at the 2007 Pan American Games in Rio de Janeiro, Brazil, which earned him a qualifying place for the Olympics, with an impressive score of 5,344 points.

At the 2008 Summer Olympics in Beijing, Velazquez became the nation's first pentathlete to compete in the men's event. During the competition, he made a strong start in the early segments, but struggled to maintain his position in the entire event, when he set the slowest time of 2:16.38 in freestyle swimming. He managed to attain fair scores for horse riding and cross-country running; however, these were insufficient for him to place near the top, placing fifteenth out of thirty-six competitors in the men's event, with a total score of 5,292 points.
