= Óscar Soto =

Mexican modern pentathlete (born 1983)

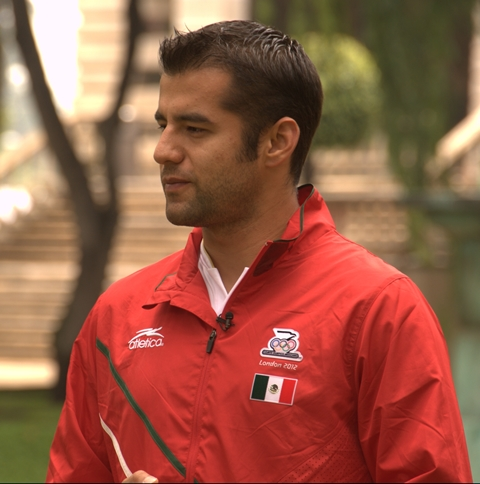

Personal information
- Full name: Óscar Soto Carrillo
- Born: 9 June 1983 (age 43) Mexico City, Mexico
- Height: 1.79 m (5 ft 10 in)
- Weight: 72 kg (159 lb)

Sport
- Sport: Modern pentathlon
- Coached by: Gabriel Gil Marin, Akhenatón Hernandez, Gearnys Francoi, Fernando Lopez and Pavel Estrada
- Retired: 2012
Medal record
Men's modern pentathlon
Representing Mexico
Pan American Games
| Gold medal – first place | 2011 Guadalajara | Individual |
Central American and Caribbean Games
| Gold medal – first place | 2006 Cartagena | Individual |
| Gold medal – first place | 2006 Cartagena | Team |
| Gold medal – first place | 2010 Mayagüez | Individual |
| Silver medal – second place | 2010 Mayagüez | Team |

Óscar Soto Carrillo (born 9 June 1983 in Mexico City) is a two-time Olympic modern pentathlete from Mexico. He also won silver medal at the 2002 Junior World Championships in Sydney, Australia, also individual and team gold medals at the 2006 and 2010 Central American and Caribbean Games in Cartagena, Colombia, and Mayagüez, Puerto Rico, and at the 2011 Pan American Games in his home nation, Guadalajara, Mexico.

Soto achieved his best results, and performed consistently in each of the five sporting disciplines for the men's event at the Olympics, when he finished eighth in 2008, and fourteenth in 2012.
