= Dzmitry Meliakh =

Belarusian modern pentathlete

Personal information
- Nationality: Belarus
- Born: 2 July 1979 (age 46) Minsk, Belarus
- Height: 1.78 m (5 ft 10 in)
- Weight: 71 kg (157 lb)

Sport
- Sport: Modern pentathlon
- Club: Dynamo Minsk
- Coached by: Valentin Rogov
Medal record
Men's modern pentathlon
Representing Belarus
World Championships
Gold medal – first place	2008 Budapest	Relay
Bronze medal – third place	2008 Budapest	Team

Dzmitry Meliakh (Belarusian: Дзмітрый Мелях; born July 2, 1979, in Minsk) is a three-time Olympic modern pentathlete from Belarus. He first competed at the 2004 Summer Olympics in Athens, and achieved his best result in the men's event, with a score of 5,340 points, finishing in fifth place.

Following his best result, he also won the gold medal at the 2006 UIPM World Cup no. 2 in Millfield, England, and bronze medals at the European Senior Championships Olympic Qualification in Riga, Latvia in the team relay event, and the 2006 UIPM World Cup no. 5 in Cairo, Egypt for the individual senior division. Meliakh's outstanding achievements guaranteed his places at the 2008 Summer Olympics in Beijing, where he finished in only twelfth place.

Meliakh competed at his third Olympic games in London, where he had a poor performance in the horse-riding and combined running and shooting segments the men's event, finishing abruptly in thirtieth position with a score of 5,380 points.
