= Adrienn Tóth =

Hungarian modern pentathlete

Personal information
- Born: 24 November 1990 (age 35) Budapest, Hungary
- Height: 1.73 m (5 ft 8 in)
- Weight: 58 kg (128 lb)

Sport
- Country: Hungary
- Sport: Modern Pentathlon
Medal record
Women's modern pentathlon
Representing Hungary
World Championships
Gold medal – first place	2008 Budapest	Relay
Bronze medal – third place	2008 Budapest	Team
Silver medal – second place	2012 Rome	Team

Adrienn Tóth (born 24 November 1990) is an athlete of modern pentathlon for Hungary. She won several medals at the World and European Championships. Tóth competed at the 2012 Summer Olympics.
