= Aya Medany =

Egyptian modern pentathlete

Personal information
- Full name: Aya Mahmoud Medany
- Nationality: Egyptian
- Born: 20 November 1988 (age 37) Cairo, Egypt
- Height: 1.71 m (5 ft 7 1/2 in)
- Weight: 64 kg (141 lb)

Sport
- Country: Egypt
- Sport: Modern Pentathlon
- Turned pro: 2004
- Retired: 2013

Achievements and titles
- Olympic finals: 2004 Athens – 28th 2008 Beijing – 8th 2012 London – 16th
- Personal best: World Cup Final 2007
Medal record
Women's modern pentathlon
Representing Egypt
World Championships
Silver medal – second place	2008 Budapest	Individual
African Championships
Gold medal – first place	2004 Cairo	Individual
Gold medal – first place	2006 Cairo	Individual
Gold medal – first place	2007 Cairo	Individual
Gold medal – first place	2011 Alexandria	Individual
Silver medal – second place	2005 Cairo	Individual

Aya Medany (Arabic: آیة مدني; born November 20, 1988) is an Egyptian modern pentathlete. She made her Olympic début at the 2004 Summer Olympics in Athens, Greece, as the youngest competitor both in the Egyptian team and competing in the pentathlon.

== Career ==
Medany made her Olympic debut at the 2004 Summer Olympics at the age of 15. She was the youngest on the Egyptian team and the youngest among the athletes competing in the pentathlon. She finished in 28th place overall.

She won the Olympic test event in Beijing, China, qualifying for the 2008 Summer Olympics. She went into the Olympics competing once more for Egypt after conducting pre-games training in South Korea. The pentathlon event was due to take place on the final day of the Games, and as Egypt had only won a single bronze medal up until that point, she was highlighted as a potential medal winner towards the end of the Games despite having only placed in the top three of junior competitions prior to that point. However, on the day, Medany found the horse she was randomly assigned for the riding part of the pentathlon was unwieldy, resulting her in finishing in eighth place overall. She later said of the media response, "They put everything on the riding being bad, and me needing an improvement in riding. It wasn't really my fault."

She won the World Cup event held in Százhalombatta, Budapest in 2011, ahead of the Olympic champion Lena Schoneborn and British athlete Mhairi Spence who finished in third place. She competed in the 2012 Summer Olympics in London following her qualification at the 2011 African Championships in Alexandria where she won the women's individual title.

In March 2013 she announced retirement.

== Personal life ==
Medany began wearing a hijab after the 2008 Summer Olympics, despite the fact she says it gives her a disadvantage whilst running. She is considering retirement from the sport following the 2012 Summer Olympics due to the ban on full-body swimsuits imposed by the swimming federation FINA, which pentathlon takes its swimming rules from. Medany wants to swim in an outfit conforming to the Muslim faith, while the swimming requirements state that outfits "shall not cover the neck, extend past the shoulder, nor extend below the knee".

Her father Mahmoud Medany was a member of the Intergovernmental Panel on Climate Change which won the Nobel Peace Prize in 2007 alongside Al Gore. She works as a teacher assisting at the Arab Academy for Science and Technology and Maritime Transport. Her family refused to allow her to attend the rallies in Tahrir Square during the 2011 Egyptian revolution.

In 2024, Medany became a member of the International Olympic Committee.

== Career highlights ==
2002

2nd Youth World Championship, Budapest, Hungary

2003

1st Youth World Championship, León, Mexico

2004

1st Youth World Championship, Albena, Bulgaria
28th Olympic Games, Athens, Greece

2005

2nd Junior World Championship, Moscow, Russia
2nd Youth World Championship, Plzeň, Czech Republic

2006

1st World Cup #2, Milfield, United Kingdom
1st Junior World Championship, Shanghai, China
1st Youth World Championship, Popoli-Sulmona, Italy
1st World Cup #5, Cairo, Egypt
3rd USA Open Championships, Colorado, United States

2007

1st African Championship, Cairo, Egypt
3rd World Cup #2, Cairo, Egypt
1st World Cup Final, Beijing, China

2008

2nd World Cup #3, Milfield, United Kingdom
1st World Cup #5, Kladno, Czech Republic
2nd Senior World Championship, Budapest, Hungary
1st Junior World Championships, Cairo, Egypt
7th Olympic Games, Beijing, China

2009

1st World Cup #1 Mexico City, Mexico
2nd World Cup #2, Cairo, Egypt
1st World Cup #4, Rome, Italy
1st Junior World Championships (individual), Kaoshiung, Taiwan
2nd Junior World Championships (Team relay), Kaoshiung, Taiwan

2010

3rd World Cup #2, Cairo, Egypt

2011

1st World Cup #3, Budapest, Hungary
