= Sarolta Kovács =

Hungarian modern pentathlete (born 1991)

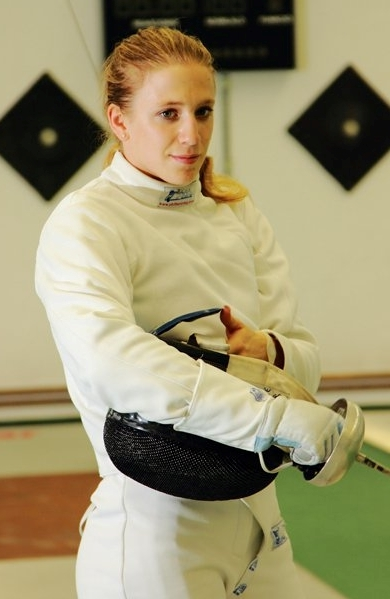
- Kovács in 2012

Personal information
- Nationality: Hungarian
- Born: 12 March 1991 (age 35) Tapolca, Hungary

Sport
- Country: Hungary
- Sport: Modern pentathlon
Medal record
Women's modern pentathlon
Representing Hungary
Olympic Games
Bronze medal – third place	2020 Tokyo	Individual
World Championships
Gold medal – first place	2008 Budapest	Relay
Gold medal – first place	2011 Moscow	Relay
Gold medal – first place	2016 Moscow	Individual
Gold medal – first place	2016 Moscow	Team
Gold medal – first place	2018 Mexico City	Team
Silver medal – second place	2011 Moscow	Individual
Silver medal – second place	2011 Moscow	Team
Silver medal – second place	2012 Rome	Team
Silver medal – second place	2013 Kaoshiung	Relay
Bronze medal – third place	2008 Budapest	Team
Bronze medal – third place	2009 London	Team
Bronze medal – third place	2015 Berlin	Team

Sarolta Kovács (born 12 March 1991) is a Hungarian modern pentathlete. An individual and team World Champion, she competed in the modern pentathlon at the 2012, 2016 and 2020 Summer Olympics.

== Career ==
In 2016, she was the surprise winner of the UIPM World Championships, as she missed much of the competitive season due to injury. The championships were held in Moscow, where previously she had won World Championship silver in 2011.

She was also part of the Hungarian teams that won gold at the World Championships in 2016 with Zsófia Földházi and Tamara Alekszejev and in 2017 and 2018 with the same teammates, and bronze in 2015 (again with Földházi and Alekszejev). She was part of Hungarian teams that won gold in the women's relay event at the 2011 World Championships (with Leila Gyenesei and Adrienn Tóth) and silver in the same event at the 2013 World Championships (with Földházi and Gyenesei).

At European level, she won individual silver in 2017, and bronze in 2018. In the team events, she won gold in the women's relay in 2011 (with Tóth and Gyenesei), bronze in the mixed relay in 2017 (with Róbert Kasza) and 2018 (with Bence Demeter), gold in the women's team event in 2011 (with Tóth and Gyenesei) and 2018 (with Földházi and Alekszejev) and bronze in the same event in 2012 (with Tóth and Gyenesei).
