= Sergey Karyakin (pentathlete) =

Russian modern pentathlete (born 1988)

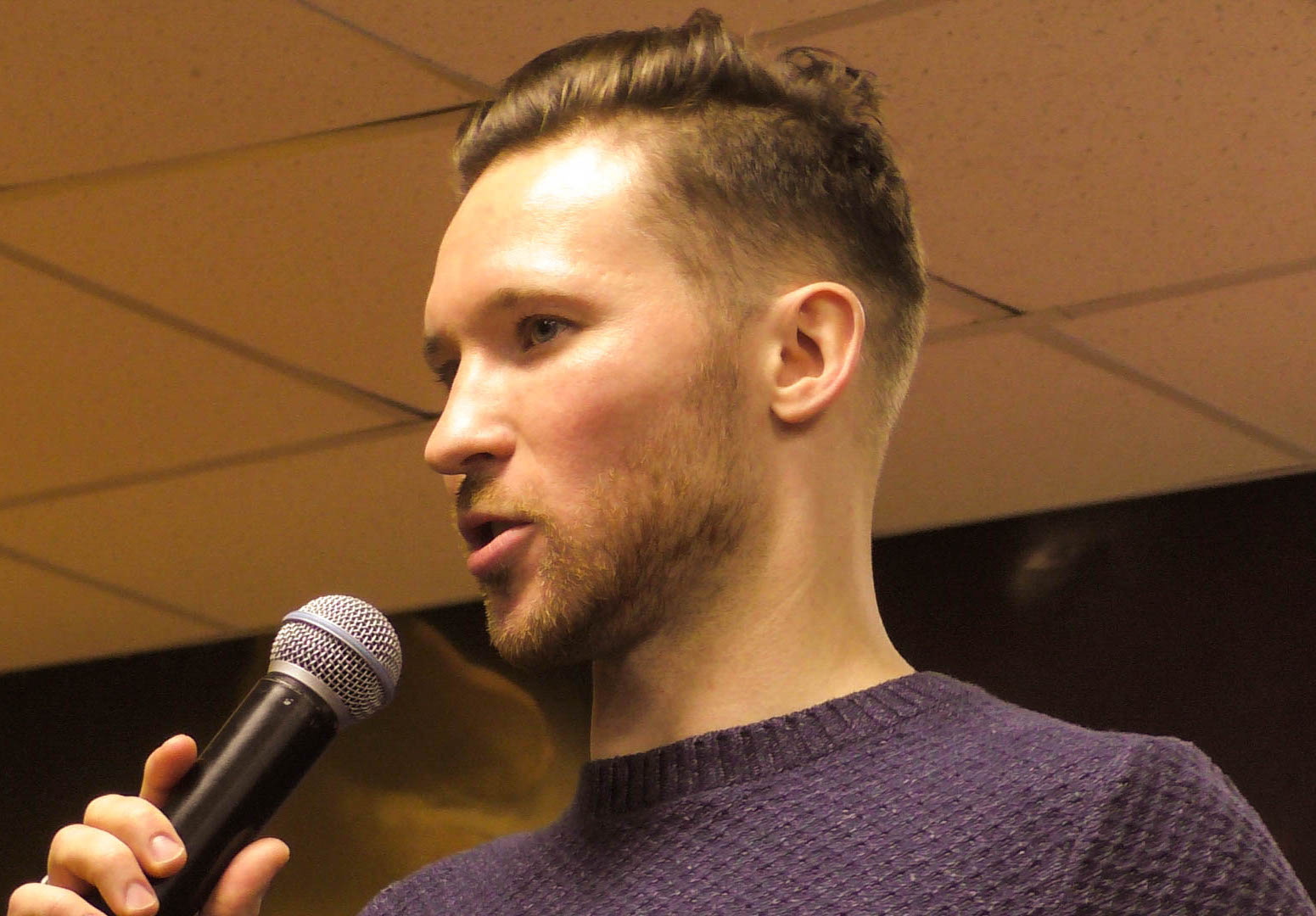
- Karyakin in 2017

Personal information
- Born: 5 January 1988 (age 38) Kuybyshev, Russian SFSR, Soviet Union
- Height: 177 cm (5 ft 10 in)
- Weight: 68 kg (150 lb)

Sport
- Sport: Modern pentathlon
- Coached by: N. I. Karyakin, O. V. Mineyeva, V. D. Kalinin
Medal record
Representing Russia
World championships
Silver medal – second place	2009 London	Men's relay
Gold medal – first place	2010 Chengdu	Individual
Gold medal – first place	2011 Moscow	Team
Silver medal – second place	2011 Moscow	Mixed relay

Sergey Nikolayevich Karyakin (Russian: Сергей Николаевич Карякин; born 5 January 1988) is a Russian modern pentathlete. He held the individual world title in 2010 and the team world title in 2011, finishing second in relay in 2009 and 2011.

Karyakin started as a swimmer and competed in biathlon (swimming and running) before changing to modern pentathlon and winning the junior world title in 2008. His strongest event is swimming and weakest is fencing. He shares his name with two other sportsmen, in chess and rally racing.
