= Amélie Cazé =

French modern pentathlete (born 1985)

Personal information
- Nationality: French
- Born: 18 February 1985 (age 41)
- Height: 1.8 m (5 ft 11 in)
- Weight: 64 kg (141 lb)

Sport
- Country: France
- Sport: Modern Pentathlon
- Coached by: Christian Roudaut
Medal record
Women's modern pentathlon
Representing France
World Championships
Gold medal – first place	2007 Berlin	Individual
Gold medal – first place	2008 Budapest	Individual
Gold medal – first place	2010 Chengdu	Individual
Gold medal – first place	2010 Chengdu	Team
Bronze medal – third place	2004 Moscow	Team
European Championships
Gold medal – first place	2009 Leipzig	Individual
Gold medal – first place	2010 Debrecen	Individual

Amélie Cazé (born 18 February 1985) is a French modern pentathlete. She won the Gold medal of the individual event at the 2007, 2008 and 2010 World Championships and 2009 and 2010 European Modern Pentathlon Championships.

She has represented France at the Summer Olympics in 2004, 2008 and 2012 and finished 12th 8th and 18th respectively.
