= Modern pentathlon at the 2024 Summer Olympics =

Modern pentathlon at the Games of the XXXIII Olympiad
- Venue: Palace of Versailles; Arena Paris Nord (fencing ranking rounds)
- Dates: 8–11 August 2024
- No. of events: 2 (1 men, 1 women)
- Competitors: 72 (36 men and 36 women)

The modern pentathlon at the 2024 Summer Olympics in Paris took place during 8 to 11 August 2024 at the Palace of Versailles and the Arena Paris Nord. The Palace of Versailles hosted all the modern pentathlon events, with the only exclusion being the fencing ranking rounds, which occurred at the North Paris Arena. Two events were contested, one for men and another for women.

In late 2021, the International Olympic Committee announced that modern pentathlon would be dropped from the Olympic program after 2024, following the controversy in the riding segment of the women's event in Tokyo 2020, which saw German coach Kim Raisner ejected from the Games for physically assaulting one of the horses.

In response to this incident, the Union Internationale de Pentathlon Moderne (UIPM) was warned by the IOC to replace the riding segment with a new fifth discipline to reconsider the sport's inclusion in future editions. Following announcement of plans by the UIPM for the replacement of the riding segment with obstacle racing, modern pentathlon was reinstated for the 2028 Summer Olympics.

== Format ==
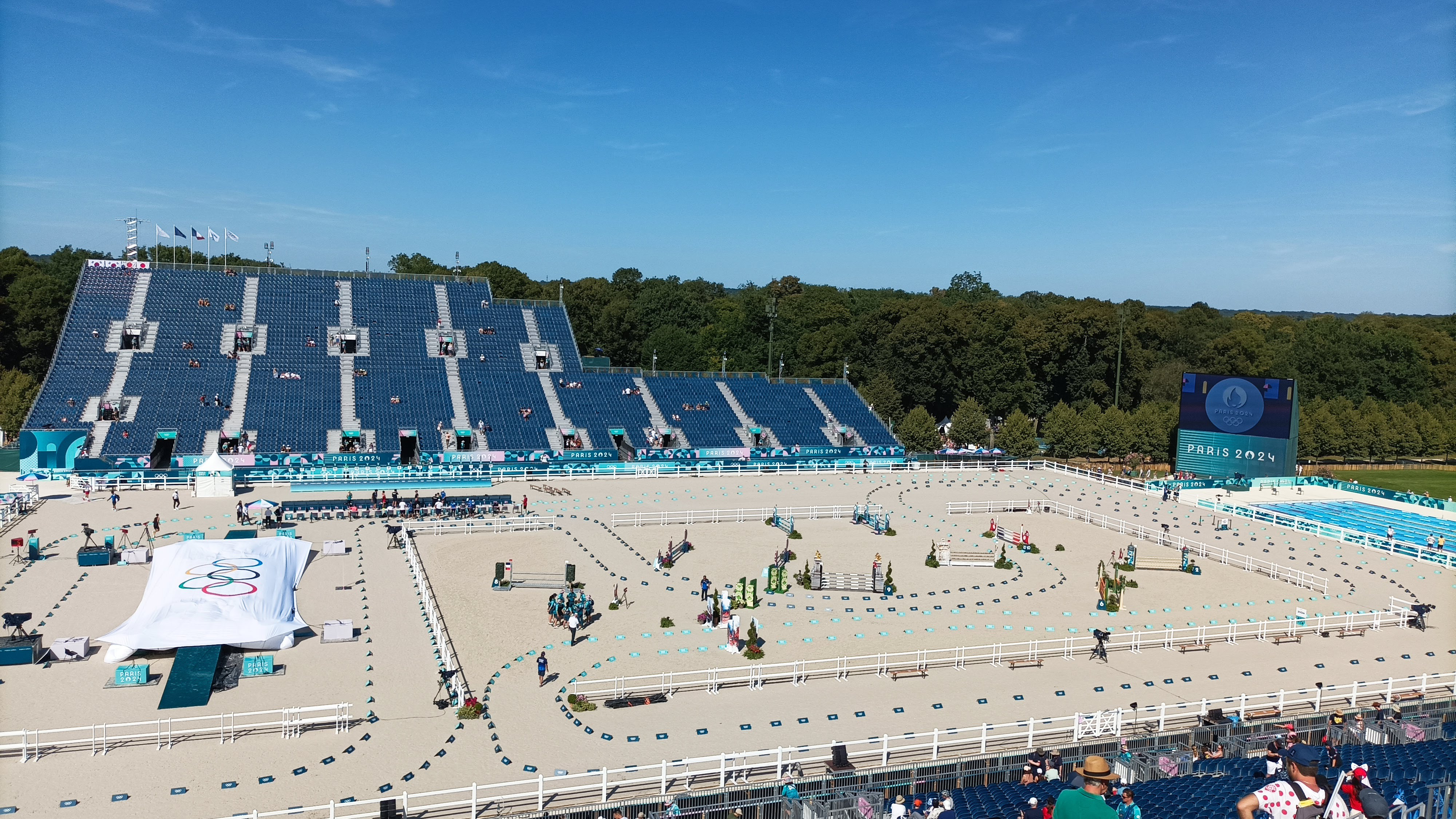
Modern Pentathlon Park at the Palace of Versailles.

At the 2024 Paris Olympics, the modern pentathlon events were hold in the following order: riding (show jumping), épée fencing bonus round, 200-metre freestyle swimming, and then the laser run (combined cross-country running and shooting). This differs from the previous order where riding was the penultimate event. The change in the order was implemented to address issues with horses in previous Olympics, where the random assignment of horses sometimes negatively impacted medal contenders. By placing riding first, the potential for a late-race upset due to a horse refusal is lessened.

The first three events (show jumping, fencing, swimming) are scored on a points system. Those points will then be converted into a time handicap for the final combined event (pistol shooting and cross-country running), with the points leader starting first and each other competitor having a delayed start based on how many points behind the leader they are. This results in the finish order of the run will be the final ranking for the event.

The show jumping competition will involve riding an unfamiliar horse over a course with 12 obstacles. The score will be based on penalties for fallen bars, refusals, falls, and being over the time limit. Following the show jumping in Tokyo, concerns were raised regarding the poor horsemanship of some of the competitors and the ethics of this section of the competition, resulting in the sport's governing body promising a review.

Similar to the previous Games, the fencing will consist of two rounds: the traditional round-robin stage plus a "bonus round." In the round-robin, each competitor faced every other competitor in a one-touch bout. The competitors will be ranked according to how many victories they earn. The bonus round will be held on one piste in a ladder, knock-out system. The two lowest-ranked competitors from the round-robin face each other in another one-touch bout; the winner will be credited with the additional point (round-robin victories being worth 5 points) and advanced to face the next-lowest ranked competitor. This continues, up the ranking ladder, until all competitors have competed in the bonus round.

The swimming portion will consist of a 200-metre freestyle race, with a score based on time.

The running and pistol shooting events are combined in the laser-run as they have been since 2012. Athletes will run 5 laps of a 600-metre (656.17 yards) course, stopping for a shooting round near the beginning of the last four laps. In each round of shooting, they shoot laser pistols at targets 10 meters away. Competitors must hit five targets, or have 50 seconds elapse before they can move to the next leg of the run; there is no additional penalty for missed shots. Because the athletes have staggered starts based on the first three events, the first athlete to cross the finish line is the winner.

== Qualification ==
Seventy-two athletes are eligible to qualify for each of the two events; a maximum of two per gender from any nation. Qualification methods remain the same for both the men's and women's events.

Host nation France has been guaranteed one quota place automatically, while two invitational positions are distributed by the UIPM once the rest of the qualifiers are announced and thereby decided.

The qualification period commences with the awarding of the first quota spot to the winner of the 2023 UIPM World Cup final. Five continental meets will afford twenty more places each per gender between January and December 2023: one each from Africa and Oceania, five from Asia, eight from Europe, and five from the Americas with a maximum of a single quota per NOC (two winners each from NORCECA and South America, and the gold-medal winner. irrespective of region, from the 2023 Pan American Games in Santiago, Chile). Three places will be awarded to the highest-ranked modern pentathletes in each gender-based event at the 2023 and 2024 UIPM World Championships, with the remainder of the total quota offered to those vying for qualification based on the UIPM world rankings.

== Competition schedule ==
| Ranking round | Semifinal | Final | Medal event |

| Date | 8 Aug | 9 Aug | | | | 10 Aug | | | | 11 Aug | | | |
|---|---|---|---|---|---|---|---|---|---|---|---|---|---|
| Men's | FRR | RSJ | FBR | S | L-R | RSJ | FBR | S | L-R | | | | |
| Women's | FRR | | | | | RSJ | FBR | S | L-R | RSJ | FBR | S | L-R |

Key

- FRR = Fencing Ranking Round
- RSJ = Riding Show Jumping
- FBR = Fencing Bonus Round
- S = Swimming
- L-R = Laser-Run^{(Finishing position in this event determines medalists)}

== Participating NOCs ==
In total of 72 pentathletes from 31 nations:

- Argentina (1)
- Australia (1)
- Brazil (1)
- Bulgaria (1)
- Chile (1)
- China (3)
- Cuba (1)
- Czech Republic (4)
- Ecuador (2)
- Egypt (4)
- France (4) Host
- Germany (4)
- Great Britain (4)
- Guatemala (2)
- Hungary (4)
- Italy (4)
- Japan (2)
- Kazakhstan (2)
- Latvia (1)
- Lithuania (2)
- Mexico (4)
- Poland (4)
- South Korea (4)
- Spain (1)
- Sweden (1)
- Switzerland (2)
- Thailand (1)
- Turkey (2)
- Ukraine (3)
- United States (1)
- Uzbekistan (1)

== Medal summary ==
A total of six medals were won by six NOC's.

=== Medal table ===
* Host nation (France)

| Rank | NOC | Gold | Silver | Bronze | Total |
|---|---|---|---|---|---|
| 1 | Egypt | 1 | 0 | 0 | 1 |
| 1 | Hungary | 1 | 0 | 0 | 1 |
| 3 | France* | 0 | 1 | 0 | 1 |
| 3 | Japan | 0 | 1 | 0 | 1 |
| 5 | Italy | 0 | 0 | 1 | 1 |
| 5 | South Korea | 0 | 0 | 1 | 1 |
| Totals (6 entries) | | 2 | 2 | 2 | 6 |

=== Medalists ===
| Event | Gold | Silver | Bronze |
|---|---|---|---|
| Men's | Ahmed El-Gendy; Egypt | Taishu Sato; Japan | Giorgio Malan; Italy |
| Women's | Michelle Gulyás; Hungary | Élodie Clouvel; France | Seong Seung-min; South Korea |

== See also ==
- Modern pentathlon at the 2023 Pan American Games
