= Modern pentathlon at the 2020 Summer Olympics =

Modern pentathlon at the Games of the XXXII Olympiad
- Venue: Musashino Forest Sport Plaza; Ajinomoto Stadium
- Dates: 5–7 August 2021
- No. of events: 2
- Competitors: 72 from 27 nations

The modern pentathlon at the 2020 Summer Olympics in Tokyo took place in 2021 at Musashino Forest Sport Plaza and Ajinomoto Stadium.

Thirty-six athletes competed each in the men's and women's events.

== Format ==
Modern pentathlon contains five events; pistol shooting, épée fencing, 200.0 metres (656.2 ft) freestyle swimming, show jumping, and a 3.200 kilometres (1.988 mi) cross-country run.

The first three events (fencing, swimming, and show jumping) were scored on a points system. Those points were then converted into a time handicap for the final combined event (pistol shooting and cross-country running), with the points leader starting first and each other competitor having a delayed start based on how many points behind the leader they were. This results in the finish order of the run being the final ranking for the event.

Similar to the previous Games, the fencing event consisted of two rounds: the traditional round-robin stage plus a "bonus round." In the round-robin, each competitor faced every other competitor in a one-touch bout. The competitors were ranked according to how many victories they earn. The bonus round was held on one piste in a ladder, knock-out system. The two lowest-ranked competitors from the round-robin faced each other in another one-touch bout; the winner was credited with the additional point (round-robin victories being worth 6 points) and advanced to face the next-lowest ranked competitor. This continued, up the ranking ladder, until all competitors had competed in the bonus round.

The swimming portion consisted of a 200-metre freestyle race, with score based on time.

The show jumping competition involved riding an unfamiliar horse over a course with 12 obstacles. The score was based on penalties for fallen bars, refusals, falls, and being over the time limit. Following the show jumping in Tokyo concerns were raised regarding the poor horsemanship of some of the competitors and the ethics of this section of the competition; resulting in Modern Pentathlon's governing body promising a review.

The running and pistol shooting events were combined in the laser-run as they have been since 2012: athletes face four rounds of shooting, each followed by an 800 metre (874.9 yards) run. In each round of shooting, they shoot laser pistols at targets 10 meters away. Competitors must hit five targets, or have 50 seconds elapse, before they can move to the next leg of the run; there is no additional penalty for missed shots. Because the athletes have staggered starts based on the first three events, the first athlete to cross the finish line is the winner.

== Qualification ==
Thirty-six athletes are eligible to qualify for each of the two events; a maximum of two per gender from any nation. Qualification methods are the same for both the men's and women's events.

The host nation Japan has been guaranteed a single place each in the men's and women's events, while two invitational places will be allocated by UIPM once the rest of the qualifiers were decided.

Between February and August 2019, the initial distribution of quotas to the athletes has taken place based on the competition results. Five continental championships afforded twenty places each per gender: one each from Africa and Oceania, five from Asia, eight from Europe, and five from the Americas with a maximum of one quota per NOC (winners from NORCECA and South America, and top three from the 2019 Pan American Games in Lima, Peru). Qualified athletes will also be the winner of the 2019 UIPM World Cup final (held in Tokyo from June 27 to 30) and the top three finishers at the World Championships in Budapest, Hungary, held from September 3 to 9, 2019.

The top three ranked athletes, not qualified by any means, were awarded a place at the 2020 UIPM World Championships in Xiamen, China, while the remaining seven were based on the pentathlon's world rankings as of June 1, 2020.

== Participating nations ==
- Argentina (1)
- Australia (2)
- Belarus (3)
- Brazil (1)
- Chile (1)
- China (4)
- Cuba (2)
- Czech Republic (2)
- Ecuador (1)
- Egypt (2)
- France (4)
- Germany (4)
- Great Britain (4)
- Guatemala (1)
- Hungary (4)
- Ireland (1)
- Italy (2)
- Japan (2)
- Kazakhstan (2)
- Latvia (1)
- Lithuania (3)
- Mexico (3)
- New Zealand (1)
- Poland (3)
- ROC (3)
- South Korea (4)
- Turkey (1)
- United States (2)
- Uzbekistan (2)

== Competition schedule ==
Schedule
Date	Aug 5	Aug 6				Aug 7			
Men's	FRR					S	FBR	RSJ	L-R
Women's	FRR	S	FBR	RSJ	L-R				

FRR = Fencing Ranking Round, S = Swimming, FBR = Fencing Bonus Round, RSJ = Riding Show Jumping, L-R = Laser-Run (Finishing position in this event determines medalists)

== Medal summary ==
=== Medal table ===
Rank	NOC	Gold	Silver	Bronze	Total
1	Great Britain	2	0	0	2
2	Egypt	0	1	0	1
2	Lithuania	0	1	0	1
4	Hungary	0	0	1	1
4	South Korea	0	0	1	1
Totals (5 entries)		2	2	2	6

=== Medalists ===
Event	Gold	Silver	Bronze
Men's	Joe Choong; Great Britain	Ahmed Elgendy; Egypt	Jun Woong-tae; South Korea
Women's	Kate French; Great Britain	Laura Asadauskaitė; Lithuania	Sarolta Kovács; Hungary

== See also ==
- Modern pentathlon at the 2018 Asian Games
- Modern pentathlon at the 2019 Pan American Games
