= Modern Pentathlon Australia =

Sports governing body in Australia

- Sport: Modern pentathlon
- Jurisdiction: Australia
- Abbreviation: MPA
- Affiliation: UIPM
- Headquarters: South Yarra, Victoria
- President: Kitty Chiller

Official website
- modernpentathlon.org.au
- (Australia)

Modern Pentathlon Australia (MPA) is the governing body for the sport of modern pentathlon in Australia.
