= Modern pentathlon at the 2012 Summer Olympics =

Modern pentathlon at the Games of the XXX Olympiad
- Venue: Aquatics Centre; Copper Box; Greenwich Park
- Dates: 11–12 August 2012

The modern pentathlon at the 2012 Summer Olympics in London was held from 11 to 12 August 2012. The men's and women's events each involved 36 athletes. The venues for the events were the Copper Box (fencing), the Aquatics Centre (swimming), and Greenwich Park (horse riding and combined running and shooting).

Following the July 2011 modern pentathlon Olympic test event, UIPM president Klaus Schormann told Olympic news source Around the Rings that transportation was the key issue for the UIPM during the 2012 Olympics. "The transportation is important to get from the swimming and fencing to here in Greenwich Park," he said. "This should be properly organized, for the athletes but also for the spectators as well."

David Svoboda, representing the Czech Republic, won the men's event, and Laura Asadauskaitė of Lithuania won the women's.

== Format ==
Modern pentathlon contained five events; pistol shooting, épée fencing, 200 m freestyle swimming, show jumping, and a 3 km cross-country run. It was the first Olympic Games in which the running and shooting events were combined; athletes faced three rounds of shooting each followed by a 1 km run. In each of the three rounds of firing, athletes had to shoot five targets, loading the gun after each shot; they were then allowed to resume their running. Misses were not penalised, but exceeding a maximum total time of 70 seconds would result in a penalty.

Pistols were replaced with laser guns after a successful trial at the 2010 Summer Youth Olympics in Singapore. The use of laser guns reduced the cost of the shooting section by approximately two-thirds and opened up new venues for the sport because of the increased levels of safety.

== Qualification ==
Thirty-six athletes qualified for each of the two events; a maximum of two athletes per gender may qualify from any nation. Qualification methods were the same for both the men's and women's events.

The host nation Great Britain was awarded one qualifying place automatically and two invitational positions would be allocated by the UIPM once the rest of the qualifiers were decided.

The first allocation of places to athletes based on competition results occurred between January and August 2011. Five continental championships accounted for 19 places; one from Africa, four from Pan-America, five from Asia, eight from Europe and one from Oceania. The winner of the 2011 World Cup final, which was held in London's Greenwich Park in July as the first official test event ahead of the Games, qualified. The top three placed athletes at the 2011 World Championships in September, which were due to be held in Cairo but were moved to Moscow due to the Egyptian revolution, also qualified.

In May 2012, the top three ranked athletes, who had not yet qualified by other means, at the World Championships in Rome, May 2012 were to be allocated places. The final seven places were to be awarded based on pentathlon's world rankings as of 1 June 2012.

== Medalists ==
Event	Gold	Silver	Bronze
Men's	David Svoboda; Czech Republic	Cao Zhongrong; China	Ádám Marosi; Hungary
Women's	Laura Asadauskaitė; Lithuania	Samantha Murray; Great Britain	Yane Marques; Brazil

== Medal summary ==
=== Medal table ===
Rank	Nation	Gold	Silver	Bronze	Total
1	Czech Republic	1	0	0	1
1	Lithuania	1	0	0	1
3	China	0	1	0	1
3	Great Britain	0	1	0	1
5	Brazil	0	0	1	1
5	Hungary	0	0	1	1
Totals (6 entries)		2	2	2	6
