= Modern pentathlon at the 2004 Summer Olympics =

Modern pentathlon at the Games of the XXVIII Olympiad
- Venue: Olympic Modern Pentathlon Centre
- Dates: 26 – 27 August 2004
- Competitors: 64 from 26 nations

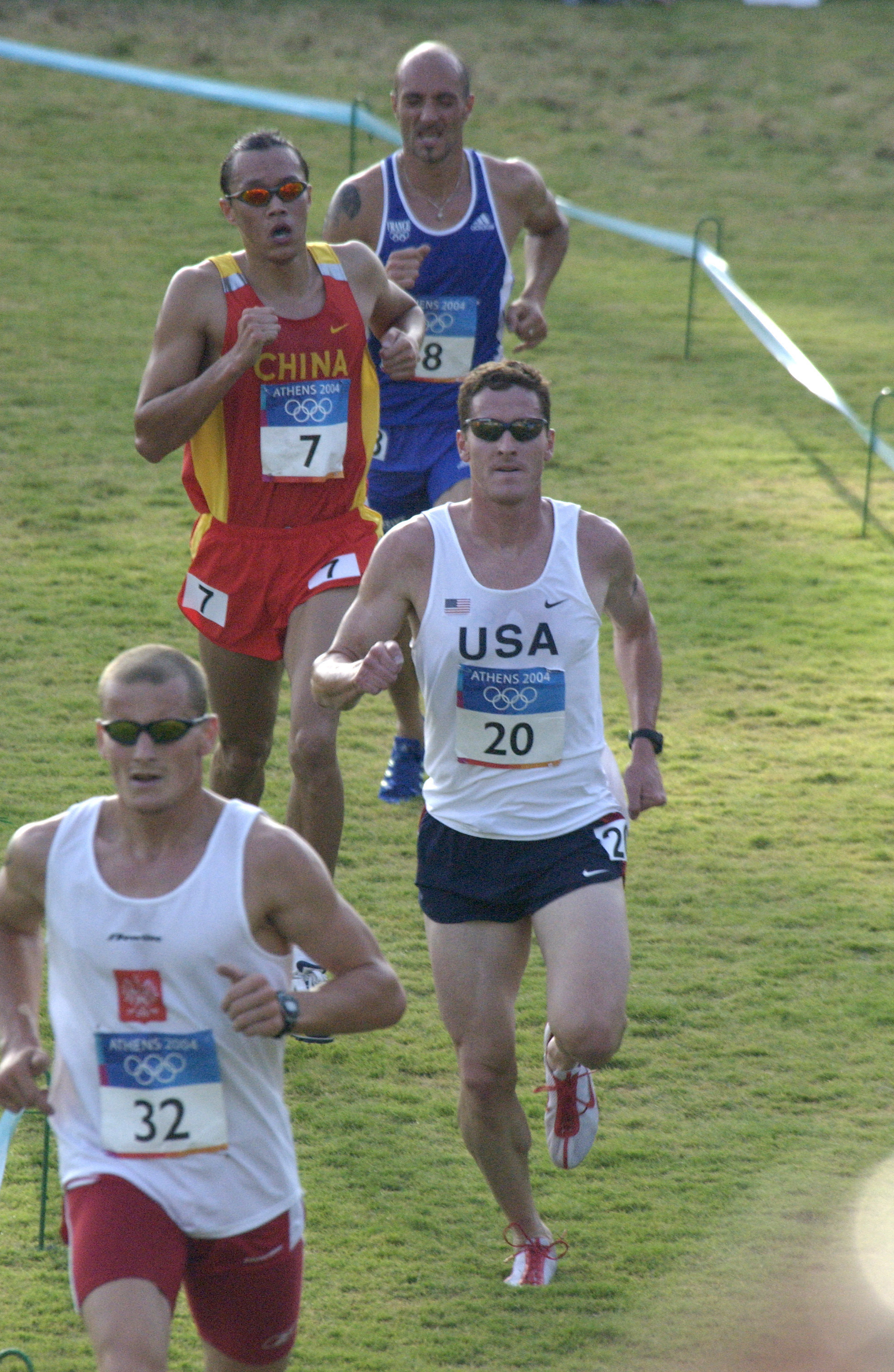
Final segment of the men's event

The modern pentathlon at the 2004 Summer Olympics was held from 26 to 27 August 2004, at the Olympic Modern Pentathlon Centre at the Goudi Olympic Complex. The men's and women's events each involved 32 athletes, an increase of eight from the previous games.

The Eastern European nations continued to dominate in the men's event as Andrey Moiseev won the gold medal, followed by Lithuania's Andrejus Zadneprovskis and Libor Capalini of the Czech Republic, who each obtained the silver and bronze medals, respectively. Zsuzsanna Vörös of Hungary, on the other hand, won the gold medal in the women's event, while Latvia's Jeļena Rubļevska, who finished eighth in Sydney, took the silver. Georgina Harland of Great Britain won the nation's third overall Olympic medal in the women's event, as she claimed the bronze.

== Format ==
Modern pentathlon contained five events; pistol shooting, épée fencing, 200 m freestyle swimming, show jumping, and a 3 km cross-country run. They were held in that order, with each segment awarding points to competitors based on their performance in the segment. The points from each of the events were summed to give a final ranking; in addition, the running segment at the end of the day used a staggered start designed so that the order in which runners finished would be the same as their ranking by total points.

== Qualification ==
Qualification for the modern pentathlon event was run by the International Modern Pentathlon Union (UIPM). 32 men and 32 women qualified, with a limit of 2 competitors per gender for each National Olympic Committee. As a minimum, men were required to have earned 5,100 points either on 1 June 2004 UIPM ranking list or at a continental qualifying competition. Women needed 4,800 points. The pentathlete must have also earned one of 30 qualifying places at a tournament or one of 2 invitational places.

Qualification tournaments were:

- 2002 World Cup Final - first place
- 2003 World Championships - top three places
- 2003 World Cup Final - top two places
- 2003-04 Continental championships:
  - Africa - first place
  - Asia - top two places
  - Oceania - first place
  - North America - first place
  - South America - first place
  - Europe - top three places
- 2004 World Championships - top nine places
- 2004 World Cups - top two places in each of the three competitions

In addition, the host nation was guaranteed at least one competitor in each gender if none qualified as above, and the Tripartite Commission allocated one invitational place. If more than one of the qualification places was won by a single competitor or more than two were won by a single NOC, the field was brought up to 32 competitors by selecting the highest-rated pentathlete on the UIPM ranking list of 1 June 2004.

== Medalists ==
Event	Gold	Silver	Bronze
Men's	Andrey Moiseev; Russia	Andrejus Zadneprovskis; Lithuania	Libor Capalini; Czech Republic
Women's	Zsuzsanna Vörös; Hungary	Jeļena Rubļevska; Latvia	Georgina Harland; Great Britain

== Medal summary ==
=== Medal table ===
Rank	Nation	Gold	Silver	Bronze	Total
1	Hungary	1	0	0	1
1	Russia	1	0	0	1
3	Latvia	0	1	0	1
3	Lithuania	0	1	0	1
5	Czech Republic	0	0	1	1
5	Great Britain	0	0	1	1
Totals (6 entries)		2	2	2	6
