= Modern pentathlon at the Summer Olympics =

- IOC Code: MPN
- Governing body: UIPM
- Events: 2 (men: 1; women: 1)

Summer Olympics
- 1896; 1900; 1904; 1908; 1912; 1920; 1924; 1928; 1932; 1936; 1948; 1952; 1956; 1960; 1964; 1968; 1972; 1976; 1980; 1984; 1988; 1992; 1996; 2000; 2004; 2008; 2012; 2016; 2020; 2024; 2028; 2032
- Medalists

Modern pentathlon is a sport contested at the Summer Olympic Games.

== History ==
=== Development as an Olympic sport ===
Modern pentathlon was created by the founder of the modern Games, Baron Pierre de Coubertin, and was first contested in 1912. Coubertin was inspired by the pentathlon event in Ancient Olympic Games, which was modeled after the skills of the ideal soldier at the time. Modern pentathlon was also influenced by the tradition of civilian and military multi-sport events in Sweden at the beginning of the 20th century. It combined events that were considered to be of upper-class origin like épée fencing, pistol shooting and riding with more popular ones like running and swimming.

The five events making up modern pentathlon are:

- épée fencing
- 200 metre freestyle swimming
- show jumping with an unfamiliar horse (to be replaced with Obstacle Course racing in 2028)
- 3 km cross country running
- pistol shooting (as laser pistol shooting in a combined event with running)

After more than half a century of relative stability, modern pentathlon has been the subject of numerous changes since the 1980s with its place on the Olympic programme in question several times.

Beginning at the 1996 Summer Olympics, the five components were held on a single day instead of five. The same year, the Men's team competition was dropped from the Olympics. The women's event was first introduced at the 2000 Summer Olympics. Since the 2008 Summer Olympics, the air-pistol shooting is held during the 3 km run. Since the 2012 Summer Olympics, shooting is done using a laser gun, and running and shooting was combined as one event.

Modern pentathlon was still criticized as outdated and lacking popularity in the 2010s. The Associated Press reported in 2013 that the International Olympic Committee was considering dropping it from the Olympics. In response to the criticism, the sport's governing body, the UIPM, made changes to the sport, including by having all five contests held in a single stadium. It was planned for the 2016 Summer Olympics but held for the first time at the 2020 Summer Olympics.

In the 2024 Paris Olympics, the modern pentathlon events were held in the following order: riding, fencing bonus round, swimming, and then the laser run (combined running and shooting). This differs from the previous order where riding was the penultimate event. The change in the order was implemented to address issues with horses in previous Olympics, where the random assignment of horses sometimes negatively impacted medal contenders. By placing riding first, the potential for a late-race upset due to a horse refusal is lessened.

The events of modern pentathlon at the Olympic Games were as follows:

Event	1912	20	24	28	32	36	48	52	56	60	64	68	72	76	80	84	88	92	96	2000	04	08	12	16	20	24	28
Épée Fencing	Round-robin	●	●	●	●	●	●	●	●	●	●	●	●	●	●	●	●	●	●	●	●	●	●	Round-robin & bonus	●	●	●
Swimming	300 m	●	●	●	●	●	●	●	●	●	●	●	●	●	●	●	●	●	●	200 m	●	●	●	●	●	●	●
Riding	Cross-country	●	●	●	●	●	●	●	●	●	●	●	●	●	●	●	Show Jumping	●	●	●	●	●	●	●	●	●	–
Obstacle Course racing	–	–	–	–	–	–	–	–	–	–	–	–	–	–	–	–	–	–	–	–	–	–	–	–	–	–	●
Shooting	Pistol	●	●	●	●	●	●	●	●	●	●	●	●	●	●	●	●	Air Pistol	●	●	●	●	Laser	●	●	●	●
Cross Country Running	4000 m	●	●	●	●	●	●	●	●	●	●	●	●	●	●	●	●	●	●	3000 m	●	●	●	3200 m	●	●	3000 m
Venues	5	1	4	5	5	5	3	1	4	5	5	4	5	5	4	2	5	5	3	3	2	3	3	3	2	2	1

=== Horse riding ===
The horse riding event in modern pentathlon has been debated - for different reasons - since the invention of the sport. Coubertin and the organisers of the 1912 Summer Olympics had different views on the availability of horses: Coubertin wanted randomly assigned horses provided by the hosts while the Swedish committee preferred that the competitors bring their own horses.

For the 1988 Summer Olympics cross-country riding was changed to show jumping.

In November 2021, UIPM announced that show jumping would not be a part of the Olympic modern pentathlon starting from the 2028 Summer Olympics, which was connected to an incident in the 2020 Games where German women's coach Kim Raisner had punched pentathlete Annika Schleu's horse. In response, 650 pentathletes put their names on a letter criticizing the lack of collaboration with them and asking for UIPM executives to resign, with UIPM stating it will discuss the matter with them.

== Events ==
Modern pentathlon has been on the Olympic program continuously since 1912. A women's event was not included until the 2000 Games.

Event	12	20	24	28	32	36	48	52	56	60	64	68	72	76	80	84	88	92	96	00	04	08	12	16	20	24	28	Years
Men's individual	•	•	•	•	•	•	•	•	•	•	•	•	•	•	•	•	•	•	•	•	•	•	•	•	•	•	•	27
Men's team								•	•	•	•	•	•	•	•	•	•	•										11
Women's individual																				•	•	•	•	•	•	•	•	8
Total Events	1	1	1	1	1	1	1	2	2	2	2	2	2	2	2	2	2	2	1	2	2	2	2	2	2	2	2	

== Medal table ==
Rank	Nation	Gold	Silver	Bronze	Total
1	Hungary	10	8	6	24
2	Sweden	9	7	5	21
3	Soviet Union	5	5	5	15
4	Great Britain	4	2	3	9
5	Russia	4	1	0	5
6	Poland	3	0	1	4
7	Italy	2	2	4	8
8	Germany	2	0	1	3
9	Lithuania	1	3	1	5
10	Egypt	1	1	0	2
11	Czech Republic	1	0	1	2
12	Australia	1	0	0	1
12	Kazakhstan	1	0	0	1
14	United States	0	6	3	9
15	France	0	2	2	4
16	Finland	0	1	4	5
17	Czechoslovakia	0	1	1	2
17	Unified Team	0	1	1	2
19	China	0	1	0	1
19	Japan	0	1	0	1
19	Latvia	0	1	0	1
19	Ukraine	0	1	0	1
23	Belarus	0	0	2	2
23	South Korea	0	0	2	2
25	Brazil	0	0	1	1
25	Mexico	0	0	1	1
Totals (26 entries)		44	44	44	132

== Nations and number of national participants ==
Nation	96	00	04	08	12	20	24	28	32	36	48	52	56	60	64	68	72	76	80	84	88	92	96	00	04	08	12	16	20	24	28	Years
Argentina											3	3	1	3														2	1	1		7
Australia												1	3	3	3	3	2	2	1	3	1	3	1	2	2	1	2	2	2	1		19
Austria					1					2				3	3	3	3		2	3	1						1					10
Bahrain																				3	3											2
Belarus																								2	3	4	4	1	3			6
Belgium							4	3		3	3	1		1																		6
Brazil										3	3	3	3	3	1										2	1	1	2	1	1		12
Bulgaria																3	3	3	3			2		1				1		1		8
Canada																	3	3			3	2			2	3	2	2				8
Chile											2	3	3		1						3					1	1		1	1		9
China																					1	1		2	3	4	4	4	4	3		9
Chinese Taipei																				1	2											2
Cuba																										1		2	2	1		4
Czech Republic																									3	3	3	3	2	6		6
Czechoslovakia							2	3			2		1			1		3	3		3	3										9
Denmark					4	4	3	2						1		1	3	2		1				1								10
East Germany																3																1
Ecuador																													1	2		2
Egypt																				3	3	3		1	2	3	3	3	4	4		12
Estonia																						1	1	1								3
Finland						2	3	3		3	3	3	3	3	3	3	3	3	3	3												13
France					2	4	4	3	1	3	3	3	1	3		3	3	3	3	3	3	3	2	3	4	3	3	3	4	4		25
Georgia																							1									1
United Team of Germany														3	3																	2
Germany					1			3	3	3		3										3		2	3	4	4	4	4	4		13
Great Britain					3	4	4	3	3	3	3	3	3	3	3	3	3	3	3	3	3	3	1	2	2	4	4	4	4	4		26
Greece										1												1		1	2							4
Guatemala																						1			1	1	1	2	1	1		7
Hungary								1	3	3	3	3	3	3	3	3	3	3	3		3	3	3	4	4	4	4	4	4	4		22
Ireland																			3								2	2	1			4
Italy						1	4	3	3	3	3	3	1	3	1	3	3	3	1	3	3	3	3	3	4	4	4	4	2	4		25
Japan														2	3	3	3	3		3	3	1				1	3	3	3	2		13
Kazakhstan																							2		2	2	2	2	2	2		7
Kyrgyzstan																							1		2							2
Latvia																						3	1	2	2	2	2	1	1	1		9
Lithuania																						3	1	1	2	4	3	3	3	2		9
Morocco														2																		1
Mexico									2	2	2	3	3	3	3	3	3		2	3	3	3	2	2	2	2	2	2	4	4		21
Netherlands					1		4	3	1	3							3															6
New Zealand																			1													1
Norway					2	2	2																									3
Peru										1												1										2
Poland								3						3			3	3	3		3	3	2	3	4	4	3	3	3	4		15
Portugal								1	2			3								3	1	1	1									7
Romania													3				3		3			1	1	1								6
Russia					5																		3	3	4	4	4	3				7
ROC																													3			1
South Africa												1	3	1								1	1	1								6
South Korea															1					3	3	3	1		2	3	3	3	4	4		11
Soviet Union												3	3	3	3	3	3	3	3	3												9
Spain											3			2					3	3	3	3				1			1	1		9
Suriname																														1		1
Sweden					12	4	4	3	3	3	3	3	3	3	3	3	3	3	3	3	3	3	1	2	1					1		22
Switzerland										3	3	3		3		1	3	1		3	3	1	1	1	1	1				2		15
Thailand																														1		1
Tunisia														3																		1
Turkey																												1	1	2		3
Ukraine																							1	3	1	3	4	3	1	3		8
Unified Team																						3										1
United States					1	2	4	3	3	3	3	3	3	3	3	3	3	3		3	3	3	1	4	4	4	3	3	2	1		25
Uruguay											3	3									1	1										4
Uzbekistan																													2	1		2
West Germany																3	3	3		3	3											5
Nations					10	7	11	14	10	16	16	19	16	23	15	18	20	17	17	18	26	30	22	24	26	27	26	28	31	32		62
Athletes					32	23	38	37	24	42	45	51	40	60	37	48	59	47	43	52	65	66	32	48	64	72	72	72	72	72		823+
Year	96	00	04	08	12	20	24	28	32	36	48	52	56	60	64	68	72	76	80	84	88	92	96	00	04	08	12	16	20	24	28	

== See also ==
- List of Olympic venues in modern pentathlon
