= Triathle =

Sport that combines three events

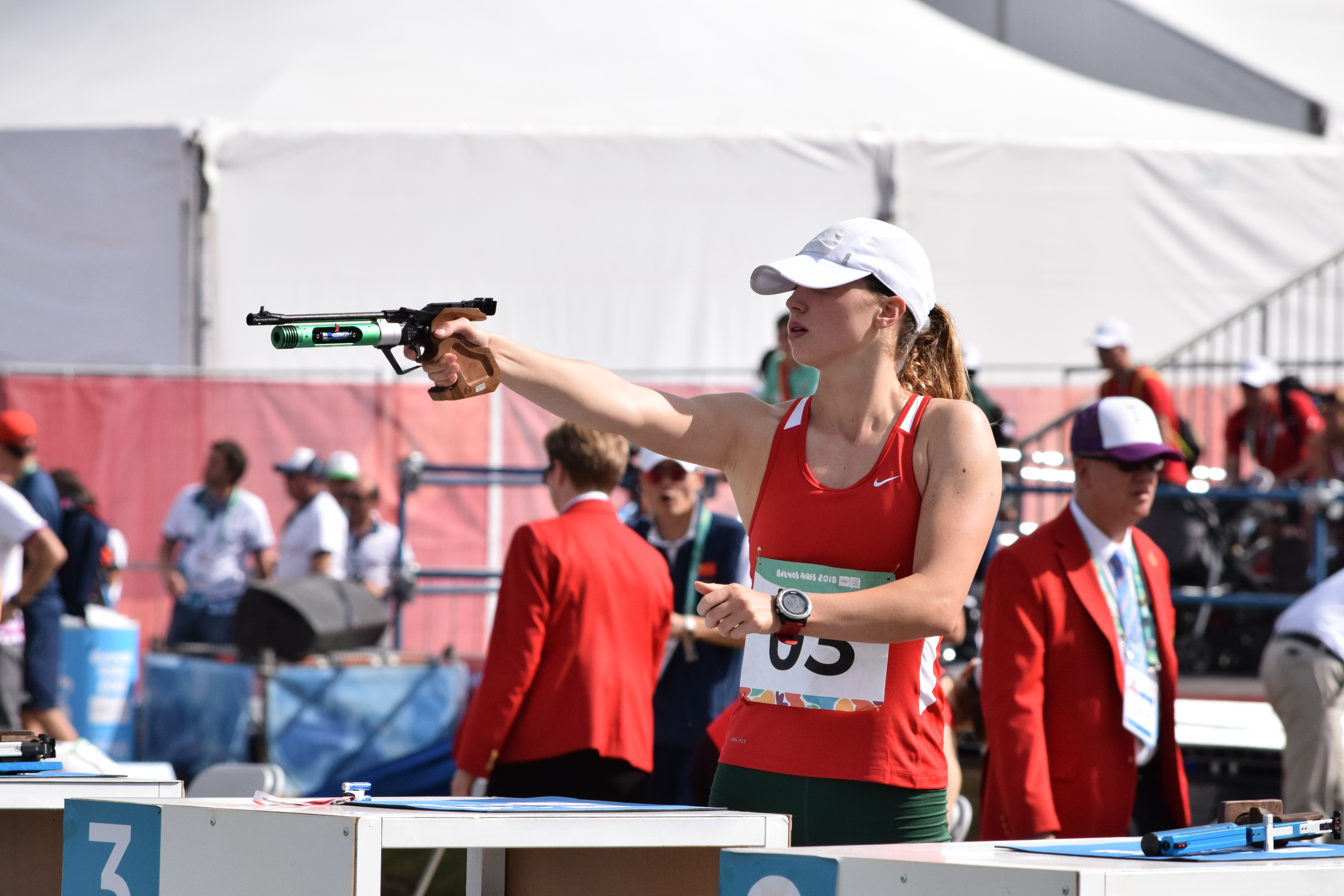
- Shooting with a laser pistol
- Highest governing body: Union Internationale de Pentathlon Moderne
- First played: 2013

Characteristics
- Equipment: Laser pistol
- Venue: Usually outdoor on grass or dirt and swimming pools or open-water

Presence
- Country or region: Worldwide

Triathle is a sub-sport of modern pentathlon consisting of running, swimming and shooting.

== Sport ==
Triathle is an event that involves cross country running, freestyle swimming, and laser pistol shooting in multiple sequences. The legs are raced with continuous transitions. Triathle competitions are held under rules of the Union Internationale de Pentathlon Moderne (UIPM). The sequence of a triathle competition is:

- Pack Start (up to 25 m from the shooting station)
- Shooting (5 targets in 50 seconds)
- Swimming (25 to 50 m)
- Running (200 to 800 m)
- [...] Repetition of shooting, swimming and running according to the age group (2 to 4 repetitions)
- Finish: The first person crossing the finish line is the winner.

A triathle contains 3/5 of the disciplines of a modern pentathlon: épée fencing and equestrian show jumping are omitted. Compared to another sport under the governance of the UIPM: triathle is a laser-run with additional swimming.

Triathle is a multisport in its own right with the focus on middle-distances. It bears strong resemblance to triathlon (swimming, cycling and running) which is an endurance sport.

== Triathle World Championships ==
The Triathle World Championships have been held since 2013. They are usually combined with biathle events.

| Year | Host City | Country |
|---|---|---|
| 2013 | Limassol | Cyprus |
| 2014 | Puerto San José | Guatemala |
| 2015 | Batumi | Georgia |
| 2016 | Sarasota | United States |
| 2017 | Viveiro | Spain |
| 2018 | Hurghada | Egypt |
| 2019 | St. Petersburg, Florida | United States |
| 2021 | Weiden | Germany |
| 2022 | Machico | Portugal |
| 2023 | Bali | Indonesia |
| 2024 | Port Said | Egypt |
| 2025 | Mossel Bay | South Africa |
| 2026 | Funchal | Portugal |
| 2027 | Sanur | Indonesia |
| 2028 | Cape Town | South Africa |

=== Senior medallists ===
==== Men ====
| Year | Gold | Silver | Bronze |
|---|---|---|---|
| 2015 | Alexandre Henrard (FRA) | Ondřej Svěchota (CZE) | Lukáš Svěchota (CZE) |
| 2016 | Alexandre Henrard (FRA) | David Ruales (ECU) | Pieter Oosthuizen (RSA) |
| 2017 | Pieter Oosthuizen (RSA) | Alexandre Henrard (FRA) | David Svoboda (CZE) |
| 2018 | Oleksandr Tovkai (UKR) | Ondřej Svěchota (CZE) | Dmytro Baliuk (UKR) |
| 2019 | Barrett Celecki (USA) | Arman Kydyrtayev (KAZ) | Tiago Sousa (POR) |
| 2021 | Dimitrios Drazinos (GRE) | Ayan Beisenbayev (KAZ) | Meirlan Iskakov (KAZ) |
| 2022 | Ayan Beisenbayev (KAZ) | Alexandre Dallenbach (SUI) | Paolo Singh (FRA) |
| 2023 | Titas Puronas (LTU) | Meirlan Iskakov (KAZ) | Paulius Vangnorius (LTU) |
| 2024 | Ayan Beisenbayev (KAZ) | Temirlan Temirov (KAZ) | Marco López (MEX) |
| 2025 | Alexandre Dällenbach (SUI) | Dylan Kruger (RSA) | Todor Mihalev (BUL) |
| 2026 | Niccolò Sancisi (ITA) | Todor Mihalev (BUL) | Marco López (MEX) |

==== Men's team ====
| Year | Gold | Silver | Bronze |
|---|---|---|---|
| 2016 | United States (USA) | Ecuador (ECU) | Not awarded |
| 2017 | Spain (ESP) | France (FRA) | Not awarded |
| 2018 | Ukraine-1 (UKR) | Egypt (EGY) | Ukraine-2 (UKR) |
| 2019 | Thailand (THA) | Germany (GER) | United States (USA) |
| 2021 | Germany (GER) | Not awarded | Not awarded |
| 2022 | France (FRA) | Lithuania (LTU) | Kazakhstan (KAZ) |
| 2023 | Lithuania (LTU) | Kazakhstan (KAZ) | Indonesia (INA) |
| 2024 | Kazakhstan (KAZ) | France (FRA) | Not awarded |
| 2025 | France (FRA) | India (IND) | United Arab Emirates (UAE) |
| 2026 | Bulgaria (BUL) | Mexico (MEX) | Kazakhstan (KAZ) |

==== Women ====
| Year | Gold | Silver | Bronze |
|---|---|---|---|
| 2015 | Gintare Venčkauskaitė (LTU) | Eliška Přibylová (CZE) | Nina Waldner (AUT) |
| 2016 | Samantha Schultz (USA) | Jessica Davis (USA) | Rachel Jones (GBR) |
| 2017 | Julie Belhamri (FRA) | Eliška Přibylová (CZE) | Nina Waldner (AUT) |
| 2018 | Aurelija Tamašauskaitė (LTU) | Eliška Přibylová (CZE) | Lina Batulevičiūtė (LTU) |
| 2019 | Samantha Schultz (USA) | Heidi Hendrick (USA) | Shermaine Tung (SIN) |
| 2021 | Athina Sarra (GRE) | Alessia Mancini (ITA) | María Carnero (ESP) |
| 2022 | Ieva Serapinaitė (LTU) | Aurelija Tamašauskaitė (LTU) | Mariana Arceo (MEX) |
| 2023 | Gintare Venčkauskaitė (LTU) | Ieva Serapinaitė (LTU) | Neda Doroševaitė (LTU) |
| 2024 | Tara Schwulst (RSA) | Anel Issabayeva (KAZ) | Julia Dale (MON) |
| 2025 | Léa Fernandez (FRA) | Julia Dale (MON) | Olympia Painesi (GRE) |
| 2026 | Natalie Hatfield (GBR) | Andrea Flores (MEX) | Alessandra Frezza (ITA) |

==== Women's team ====
| Year | Gold | Silver | Bronze |
|---|---|---|---|
| 2019 | United States (USA) | Not awarded | Not awarded |
| 2021 | Germany (GER) | Not awarded | Not awarded |
| 2022 | Lithuania (LTU) | Portugal (POR) | South Africa (RSA) |
| 2023 | Lithuania (LTU) | Not awarded | Not awarded |
| 2024 | Not awarded | Not awarded | Not awarded |
| 2025 | South Africa (RSA) | Not awarded | Not awarded |
| 2026 | Mexico (MEX) | Not awarded | Not awarded |

==== Mixed relay ====
| Year | Gold | Silver | Bronze |
|---|---|---|---|
| 2015 | Eliška Přibylová (CZE); Ondřej Svěchota (CZE) | Nicole Campaner (ITA); Valerio Quinzi (ITA) | Nina Waldner (AUT); Manfred Walner (AUT) |
| 2016 | Samantha Schultz (USA); Dennis Browsher (USA) | Nicole Campaner (ITA); Valerio Quinzi (ITA) | Kelly Fitzsimmons (CAN); Jonathan Denoon (CAN) |
| 2017 | Julie Belhamri (FRA); Alexandre Henrard (FRA) | Alida van der Merwe (RSA); Pieter Oosthuizen (RSA) | Eliška Přibylová (CZE); David Kindl (CZE) |
| 2018 | Eliška Přibylová (CZE); Ondřej Svěchota (CZE) | Valeriya Permykina (UKR); Vladyslav Rydvanskyi (UKR) | Lena Gottwald (GER); Pierre Jander (GER) |
| 2019 | Samantha Schultz (USA); Amro Elgeziry (USA) | Nadezhda Bekmaganbetova (KAZ); Arman Kydyrtayev (KAZ) | Vera Oettinger (GER); Robin Schmidt (GER) |
| 2021 | Annika Scheider (GER); Uli Raeth (GER) | María Carnero (ESP); Manuel Soriano (ESP) | Ida Arya (GER); Hermann Arya (GER) |
| 2022 | Ieva Serapinaitė (LTU); Titas Puronas (LTU) | Lea Fernandez (FRA); Paolo Singh (FRA) | Suzie Cave (GBR); Sam Cobb (GBR) |
| 2023 | Ieva Serapinaitė (LTU); Paulius Vagnorius (LTU) | Julia Dale (MON); Geoffrey Delusier (MON) | Juliana Sevilla (PHI); Samuel German (PHI) |
| 2024 | Anel Issabayeva (KAZ); Ayan Beisenbayev (KAZ) | Tauset López (MEX); Marco López (MEX) | Tara Schwulst (RSA); Stefan van Wyk (RSA) |
| 2025 | Tara Schwulst (RSA); Dylan Kruger (RSA) | Léa Fernandez (FRA); Mohamed-Kamis Mtir (FRA) | Julia Dale (MON); Geoffrey Delusier (MON) |
| 2026 | Natalie Hatfield (GBR); Sam Cobb (GBR) | Nikol Ivanova (BUL); Todor Mihalev (BUL) | Kateřina Váňová (CZE); Vojtěch Dana (CZE) |
