= Tetrathlon =

Competitive team sport

A tetrathlon (from the numerical prefix "tetra-" meaning four) is a team competition organized by Pony Clubs for its members. It is a variant of the modern pentathlon, without fencing. Thus, it comprises the four disciplines of shooting, swimming, riding, and running.

Ideally, teams consist of four members from one pony club competing against several teams from rival clubs. Competitions are usually held over two days during the summer months. It is recommended that one skill and one endurance phase is completed on each day. For example, shooting and swimming will be on the first day, riding and running on the second. The competitions are organized using many volunteers and a few paid professionals. The United States Pony Clubs is a non-profit organization, and the competitions are often hosted and subsidized by sponsors of the host club, local farmers, landowners, and parents.

There are three age categories, known as minimus, (8 to 11), junior (12 to 14) and senior (15 to 21). Boys and girls compete together. There is no minimum qualification standard to compete, but contests are only open to active pony club members (in the US this means those who have attended at least three rallies that year).

At the end of the games, rosettes are awarded to the top scores in each discipline, for the highest overall scores, and for the best team performances in each of the age and sex categories.

== Disciplines ==
=== Swimming ===
Competitors are required to swim freestyle a distance appropriate for their age and the level at which they are competing. Swimming is scored on a grid of age, level and time. Competitors have to swim for 2 or 3 minutes depending on their age, in the United Kingdom. In the United States, competitors swim 50 yards/meters, 100 yards/meters, or 200 yards/meters depending on their age and/or division of competition. Swimming is usually the first sport that takes place in a tetrathlon because it makes the participants the most tired, due to the amount of force that the participants have to exert while swimming.

=== Shooting ===
Competitors are required to shoot at stationary targets using .177 calibre air pistols from a range of 7 or 10 metres depending on their age. Younger (minimus) competitors are allowed to use two hands while older competitors must use only one. Ten shots are fired under timed conditions with a maximum of four seconds allowed per shot.

=== Riding ===
Competitors are required to complete a show jumping or cross-country course including a number of fences (jumps) under timed conditions depending on the weather. If ground conditions are bad the competitor may not be timed. The size of the fences range from 2 foot 6 inches to 3 foot 6 inches depending on the age and competitive level of the competitors. Each course also includes a hazard section, containing a swinging gate which must be opened and closed while remaining on horseback, and a slip rail, through which riders lead their horse after dismounting. This element of the course is timed and is similar to that found in hunter trials.

=== Running ===
Competitors run cross-country which may include obstacles under timed conditions. Distances are 1,000 metres, 1,500 metres and 3,000 metres depending upon age category in the United Kingdom, or 500 meters, 1000 meters, 2000 meters, or 3000 meters in the United States. Runners do not run against each other directly as in a marathon or race; instead start times are staggered at one-minute intervals.

== Triathle ==
Tetrathletes may also compete in triathles (not to be confused with the running, swimming and cycling endurance event of the same name) that include the shooting, swimming and running elements as described above, but not the riding. These tend to be held during one day during the winter months when weather conditions are less favourable for the equestrian element.
