= Laser pistol (sport) =

Piece of sports equipment for modern pentathlon, laser-run and triathle competitions

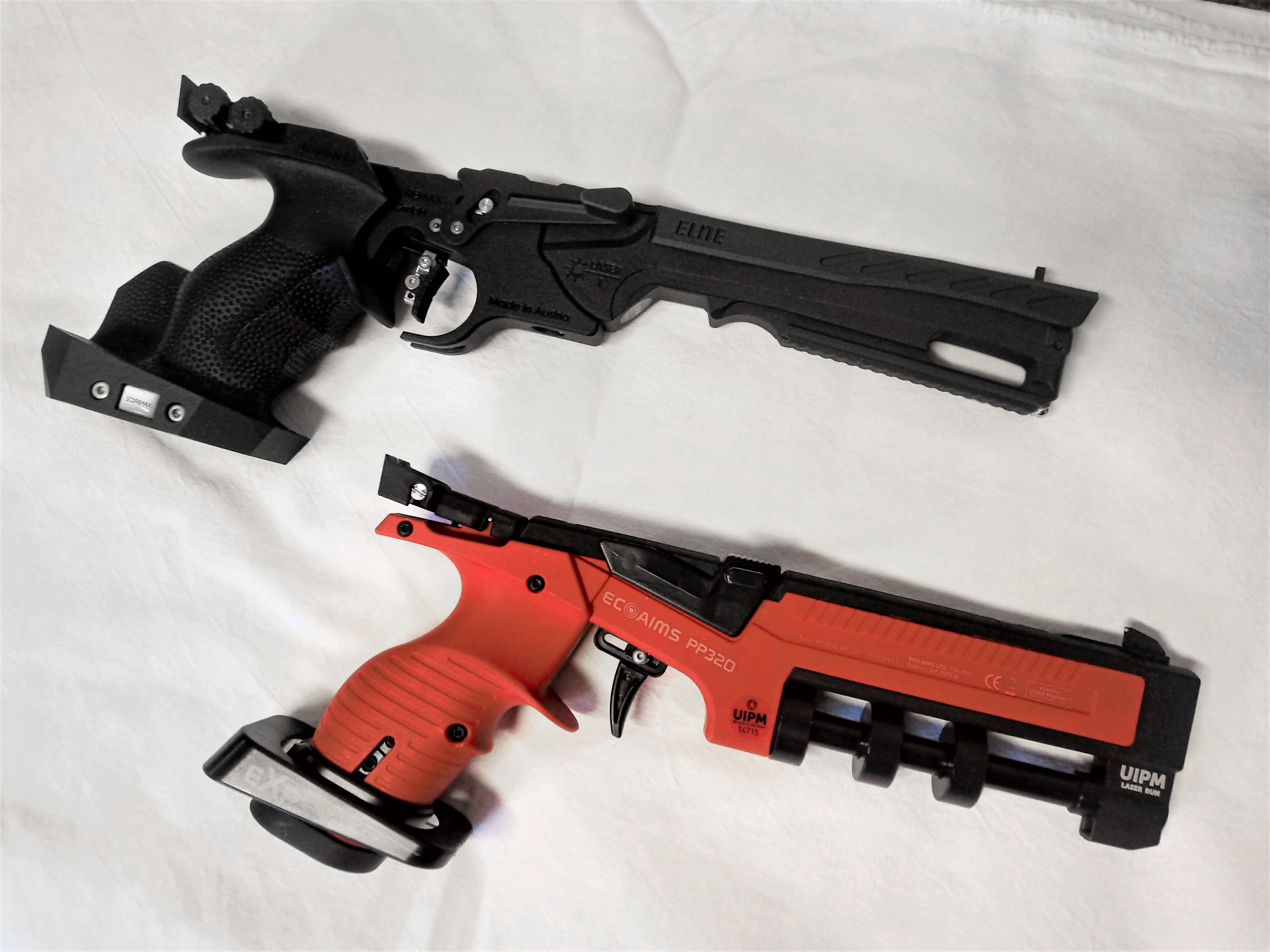
Laser pistols for modern pentathlon, laser-run and triathle. Red pistol: Ecoaims PP320EXP Laser Pistol.

The laser pistol is a piece of sports equipment used to imitate firearms and is used in some sports including modern pentathlon, laser-run and triathle competitions. Laser pistols do not fire projectiles and can therefore be safer for spectators and participants. They can also be used in more places since the requirements for a backstop are not as strict except for laser eye safety. Regulation varies between jurisdictions, but they are usually not subject to laws concerning air guns or firearms and are often sold freely.

== Technical specifications ==
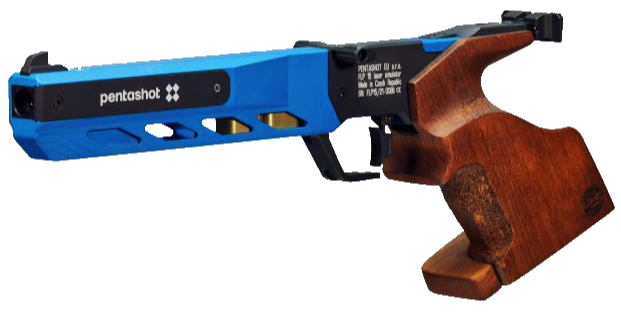
A Pentashot FLP15 (2022)

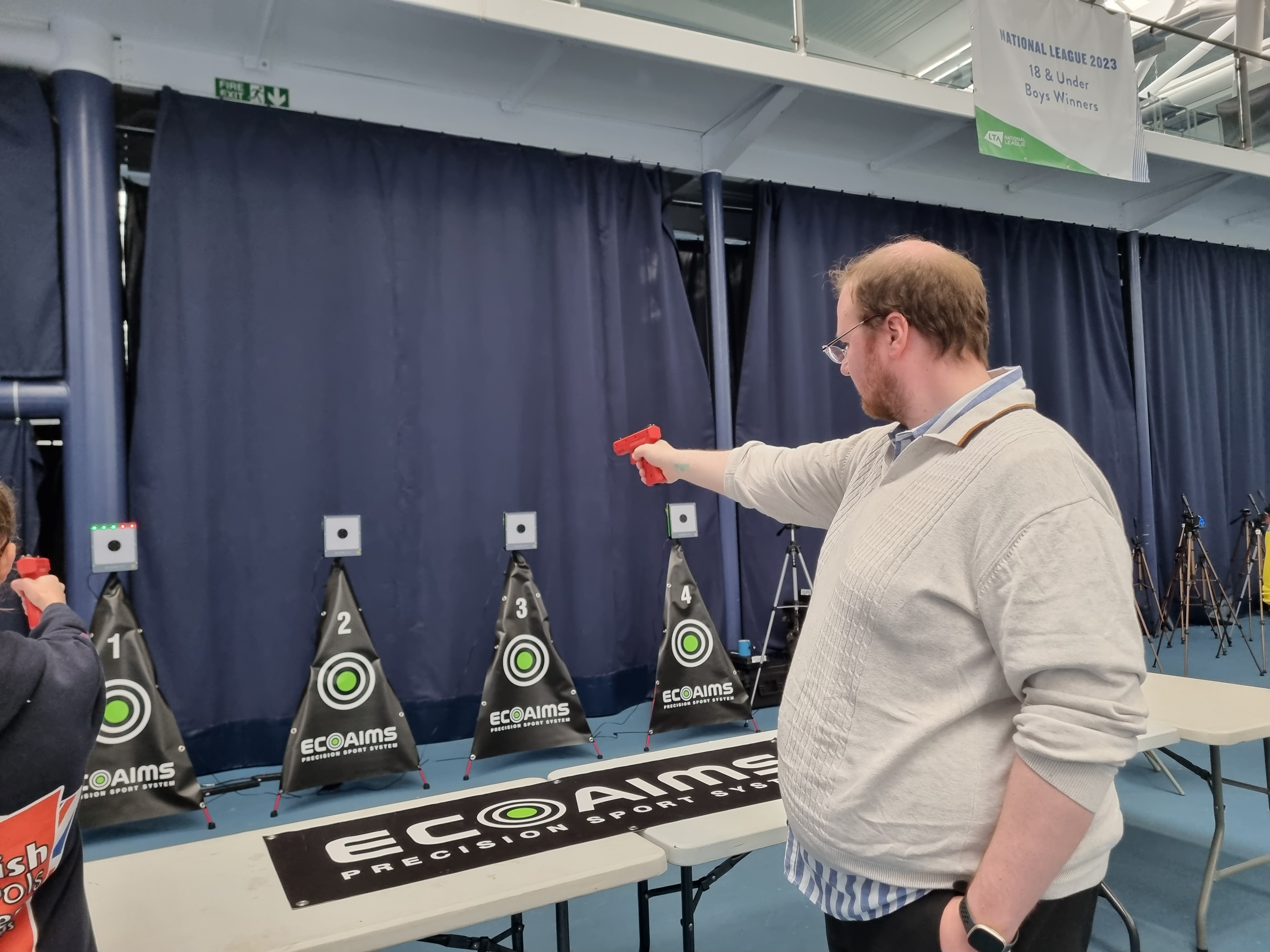
Training shooting with Ecoaims P3EXP laser pistol while aiming to smartphone compatible Ecoaims LT600PRO laser hit / miss target.

Only single shot pistols with open sights are allowed. They are loaded by a loading lever, which needs to be operated by the non-shooting hand (typically the weak hand), and fired by a mechanical trigger (typically the strong hand).

Laser pistols specifically designed for modern pentathlon or laser run can be made of plastic, metal, or a mix of both. The grips are made of plastic or wood. Entry-level models usually have ambidextrous grips. Laser pistols above the entry-level use anatomically shaped ones.

The weight of the pistol must not exceed 1500 grams. The minimum weight is 800 grams for adults, and 500 grams for youths. The maximum overall size is 420 mm × 200 mm × 50 mm. The laser is red with a wavelength of the laser is 635 nm to 650 nm. Laser pistols are categorised as Class 1: safe under all conditions of normal use.

The corresponding electronic target is 170 mm × 170 mm with a black aiming mark consisting of the score zones 7 through 10: The same dimensions as the ISSF 10 meter air pistol targets. The distance from floor level to the centre of the target is 1400 mm +/- 50 mm as well. Ranges can be built indoors and outdoors.

== Laser pistols in international competition ==
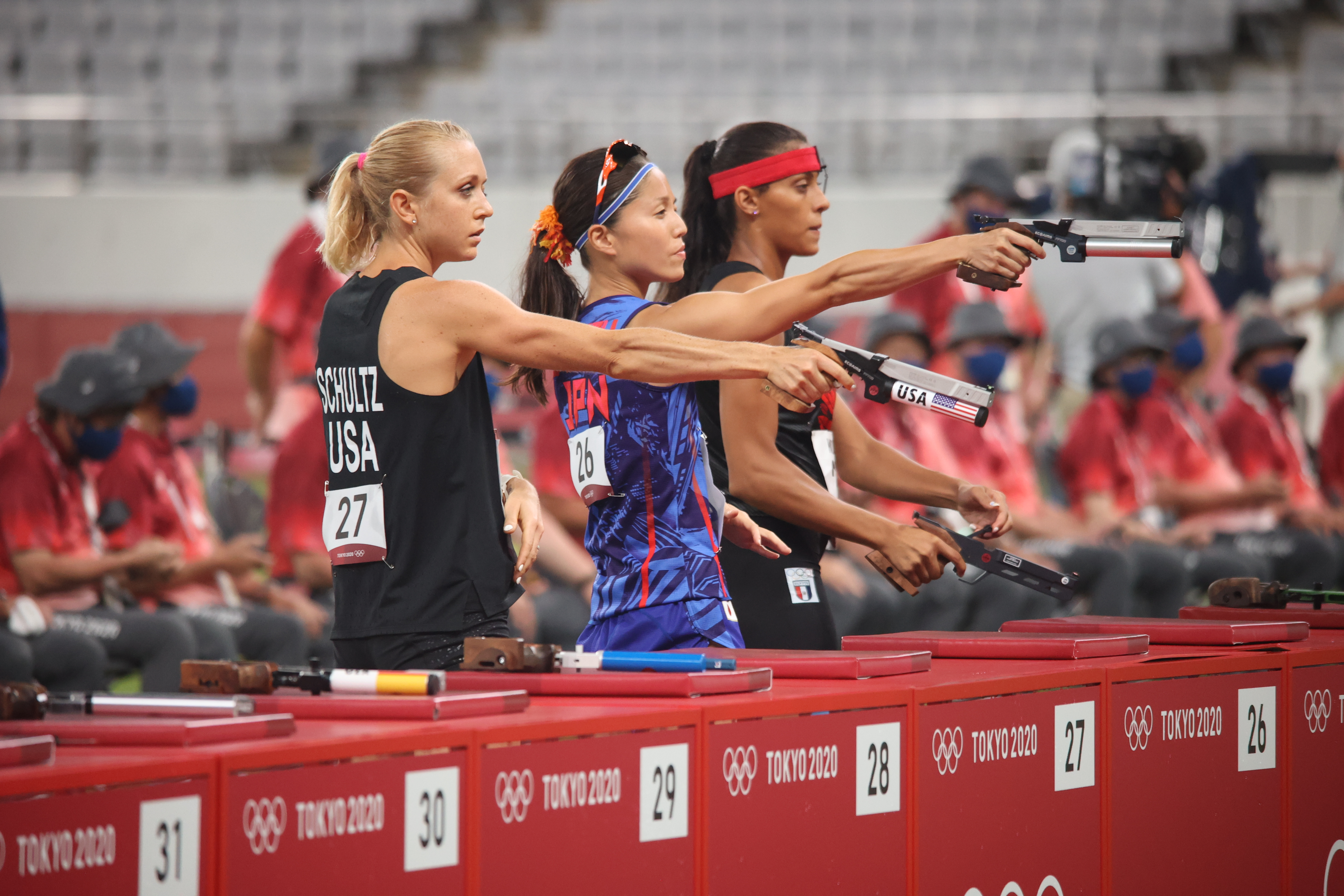
Laser shooting in with Ecoaims PP700EXP Laser Pistols in Modern Pentathlon, 2020 Summer Olympics.

Laser pistols are regulated by the Union Internationale de Pentathlon Moderne (UIPM), not the International Shooting Sport Federation (ISSF).

They were introduced in the modern pentathlon event at the 2010 Summer Youth Olympics. The first use of laser pistols instead of air pistols in a non-youth competition was in 2011. The 2012 Olympics saw the first use of laser pistols in modern pentathlon during an Olympic competition. After that, laser pistols are not only employed in modern pentathlon but in triathle and laser-run events as well.

Triathle World Championships have been held since 2013. The first Laser Run World Championships were held in 2015. Laser-run was a showcase event at the 2019 World Urban Games in Budapest.

== History ==
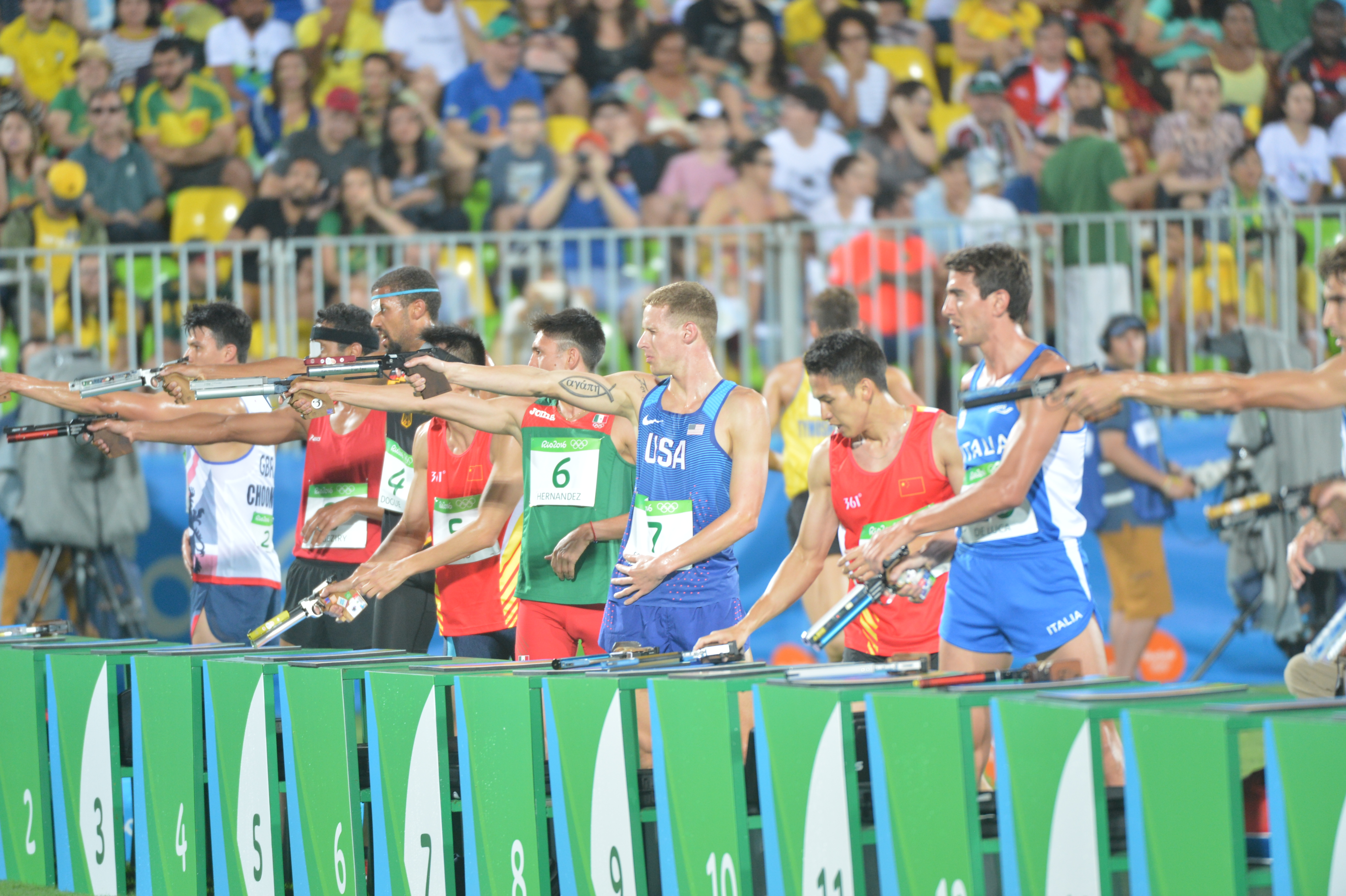
Modified air pistols with laser emitters, 2016 Summer Olympics

The first generation of laser pistols were converted air pistols in which the barrel or air cylinder was replaced with a laser emitter. Initially, the laser signal had a duration of 25.2 ms before changing to a duration of 15.6 ms from 2014 onwards.

In the mid-2010s, the next generation of laser pistols appeared, which were specially produced for modern pentathlon and laser run. This resulted in different approaches to construction: On the one hand, there are still models with the structure of a match air pistol: a very thin barrel and a more voluminous container underneath which holds additional weights or the laser emitter. On the other hand, there are models that are visually more similar to sport pistols.

== Manufacturers ==
There is only a handful of manufacturers of dedicated laser pistols and laser equipment:

- APEOM
- Ecoaims
- HiGun
- IQ-Sport (only emitters)
- Pardini
- Pentashot
- Scoremax
- Suooter

Air pistols of Feinwerkbau, Morini, Pardini, Steyr or Walther can be equipped with laser emitters (so-called 'containers') of different manufacturers.

== See also ==
- Dry fire, sometimes done using laser systems
- Light gun, controller for video games
