= Laser run =

Sport that combines pistol shooting and running

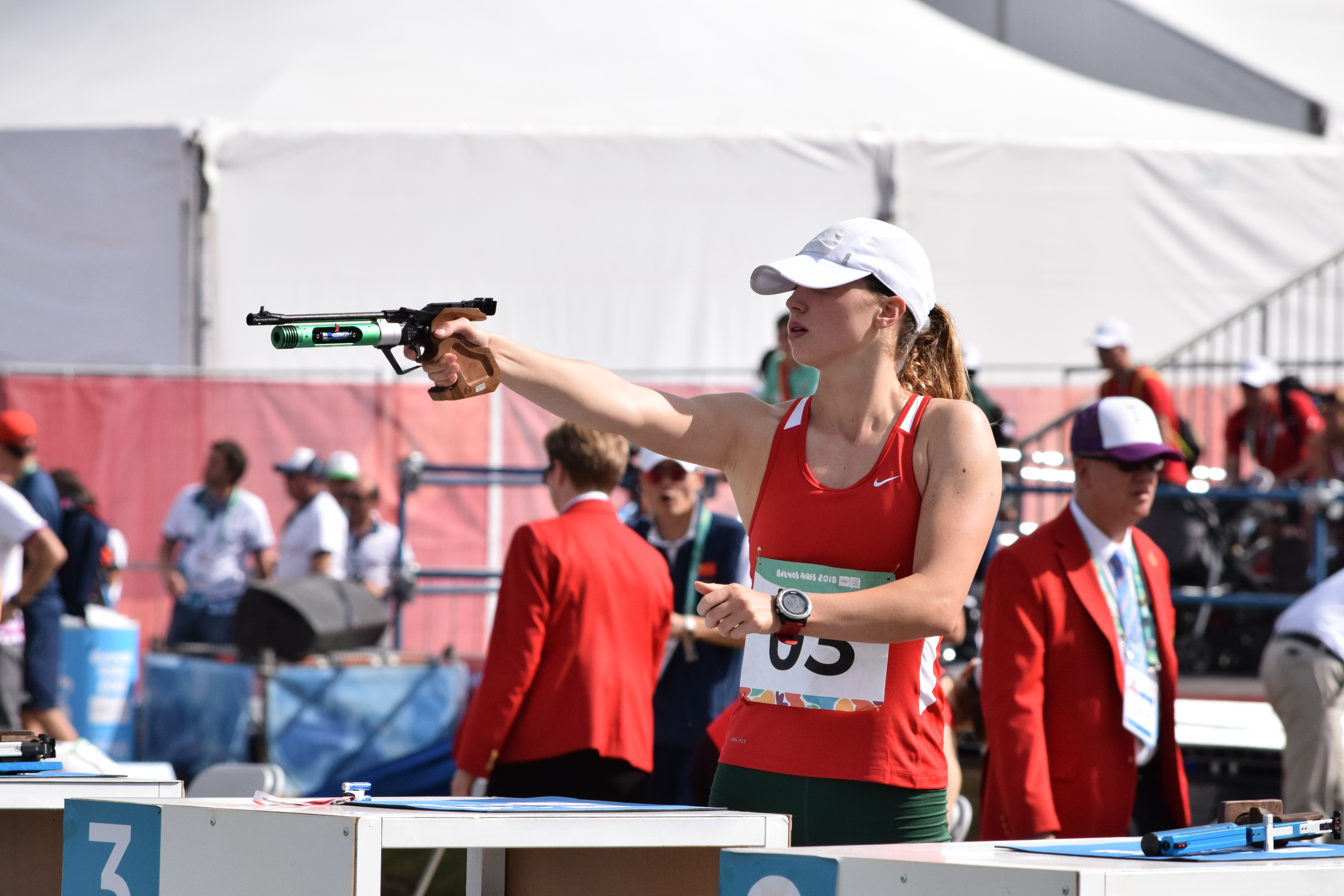
- Shooting during a laser run
- Highest governing body: Union Internationale de Pentathlon Moderne
- First played: 2015

Characteristics
- Mixed-sex: mixed relay only
- Equipment: Laser pistol
- Venue: Outdoor on grass, dirt or track and field stadium

Presence
- Country or region: Worldwide

Laser run is a multisport competition consisting of running and shooting. It is a sport in its own right and the last event of the modern pentathlon where it was formerly known as combined.

== Distance and format ==
Laser run is a competition that involves cross country running and laser pistol shooting in multiple sequences. Laser run competitions are held under rules of the Union Internationale de Pentathlon Moderne (UIPM).

The sequence of a laser run is as follows:

- Start (approx. 25 m or 300 to 600 m from the shooting range)
- Shooting (5 hits with an unlimited number of shots in max. 50 seconds)
- Running (300 to 600 m)
- [...] repetition of the sequence of shooting and running (2 to 4 repetitions)
- Finish: The first person to cross the finish line wins.

The number of repetitions and the distances depend on the age group of the competitors. Running distances range from 300 to 600 m. Distance to the target is 5 or 10 m. On senior level, a competitor runs five 600 m laps with four series of hitting five targets at a distance of 10 meters.

There are different rankings according to gender and age group.

From 2015 to 2021 the running distances were 200 m, 400 m and 800 m.

== Equipment ==
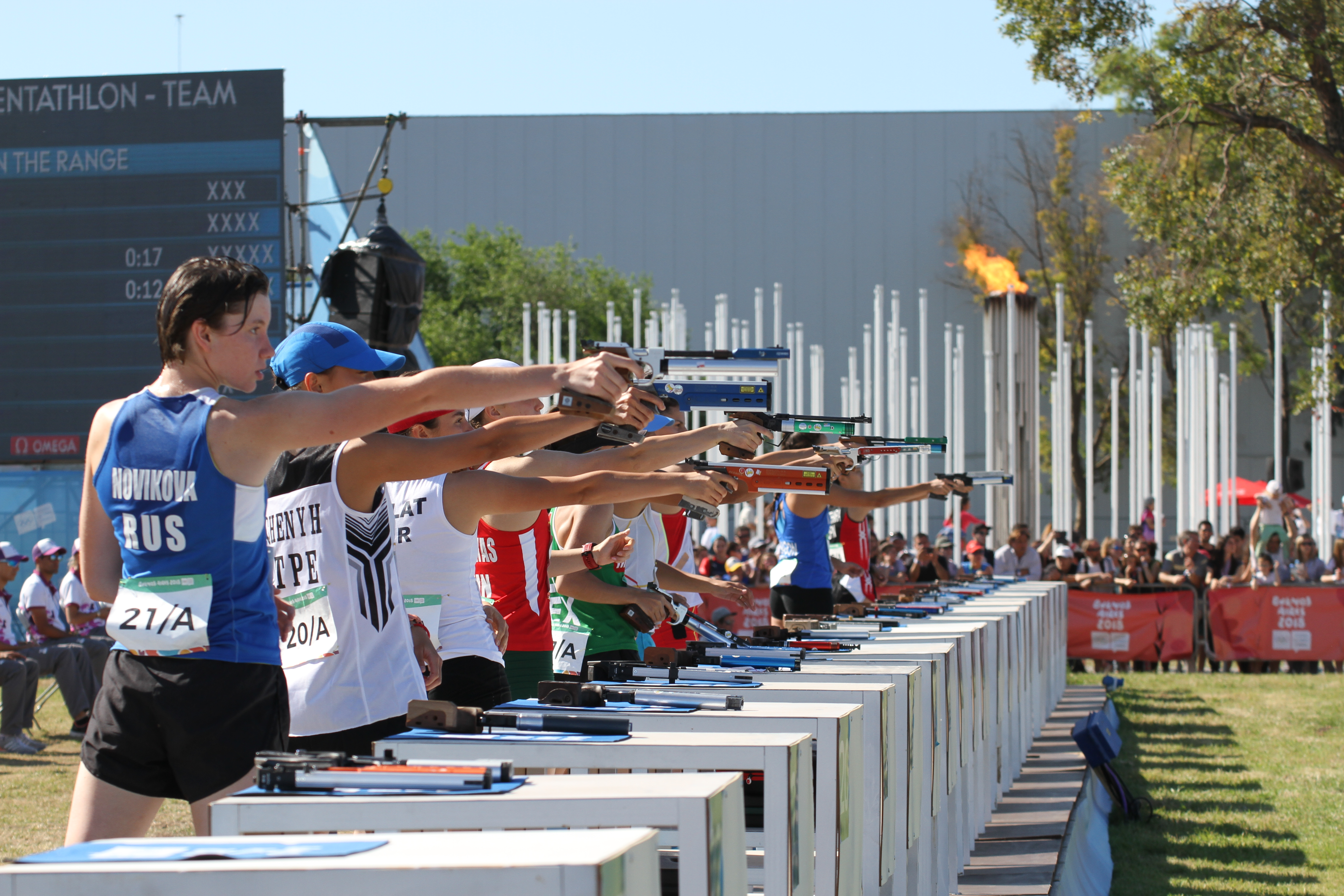
Shooting during a laser run competition

The laser run uses laser pistols and targets that have to be homologated by the UIPM. Laser pistols are usually also provided by the organizers at regional competitions to enable an easier entry into the sport. In national or international competitions, the participants compete with their own pistols. The laser pistols are safe for spectators and participants. They are almost noiseless and they are not subject to weapons legislation.

The laser run uses electronic targets with five green and red lights as indicators. The target is similar to the one of 10 Meter Air Pistol competitions with the dimension of 17 x 17 cm and a black target area of 59,5 mm in diameter. The distance from floor level to the centre of the target is 140 cm.

There are no special requirements for running equipment.

== Competitions ==
The first Laser Run World Championships were held in 2015. The Laser Run City Tour aims to introduce the sport to audiences in different cities all over the world. Furthermore, Laser run was a showcase event at the 2019 World Urban Games in Budapest and was part of the 2019 Southeast Asian Games.

== Gallery ==
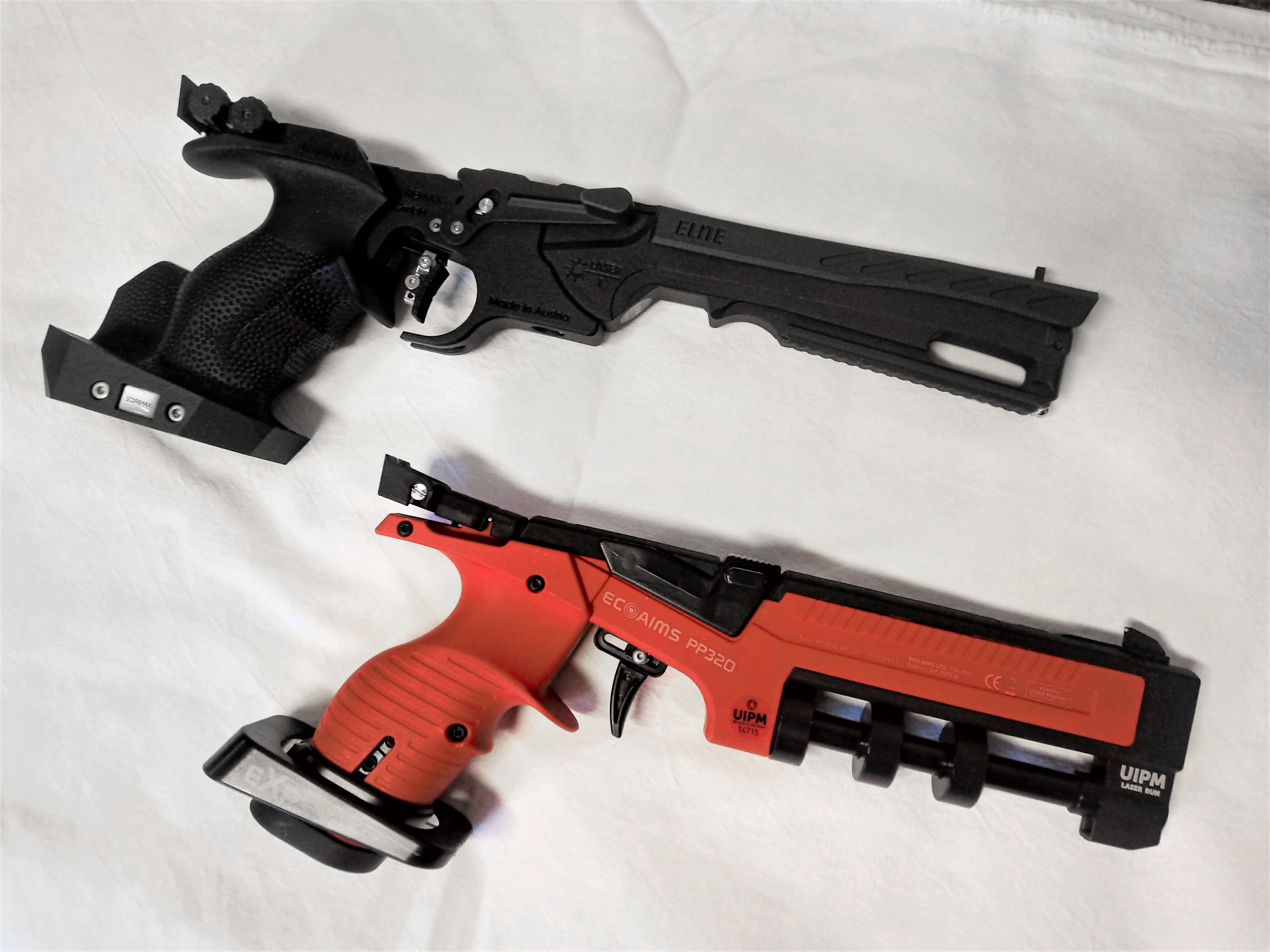
Homologated laser pistols

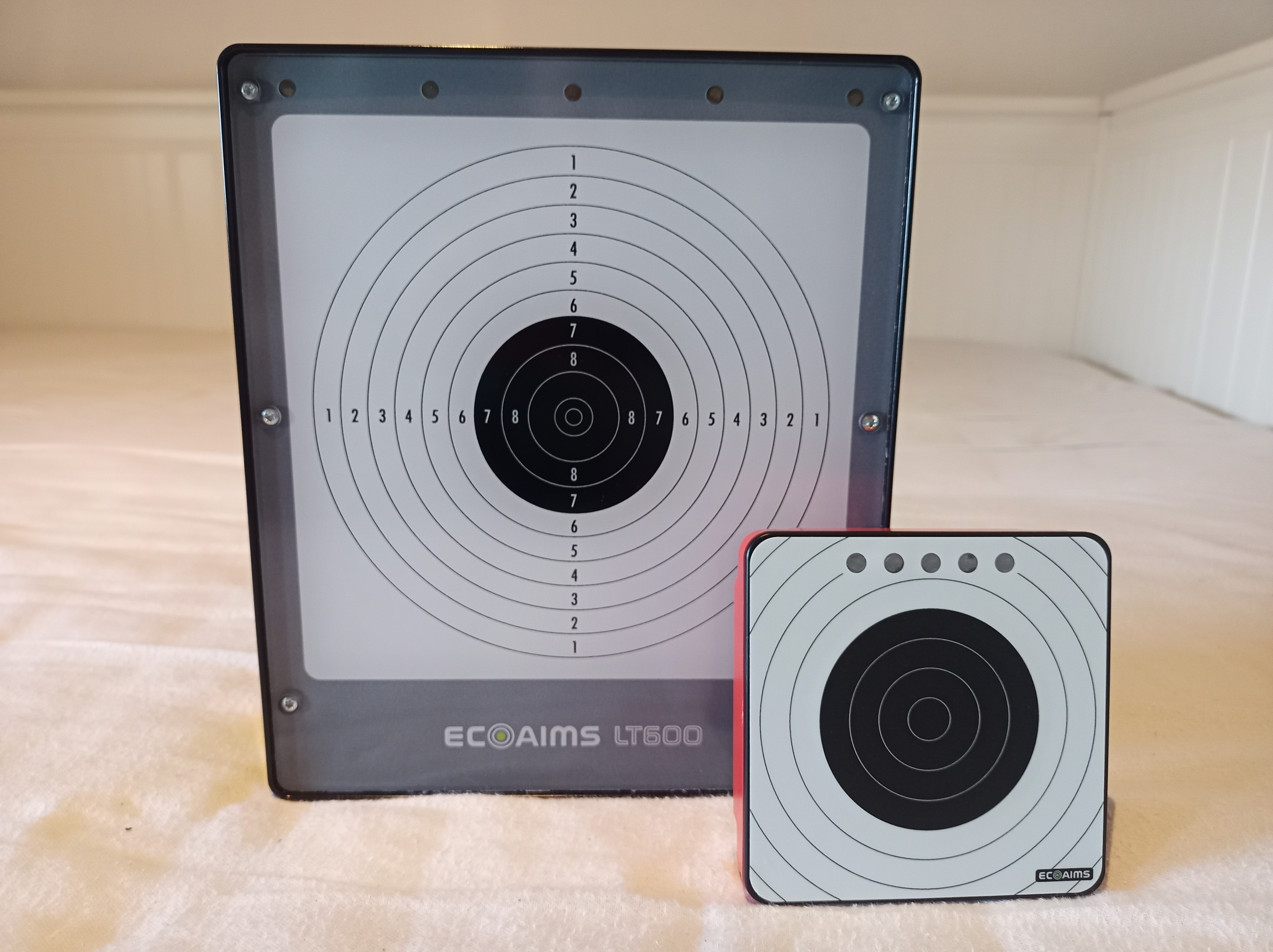
Competition target (left) and travel target (right)

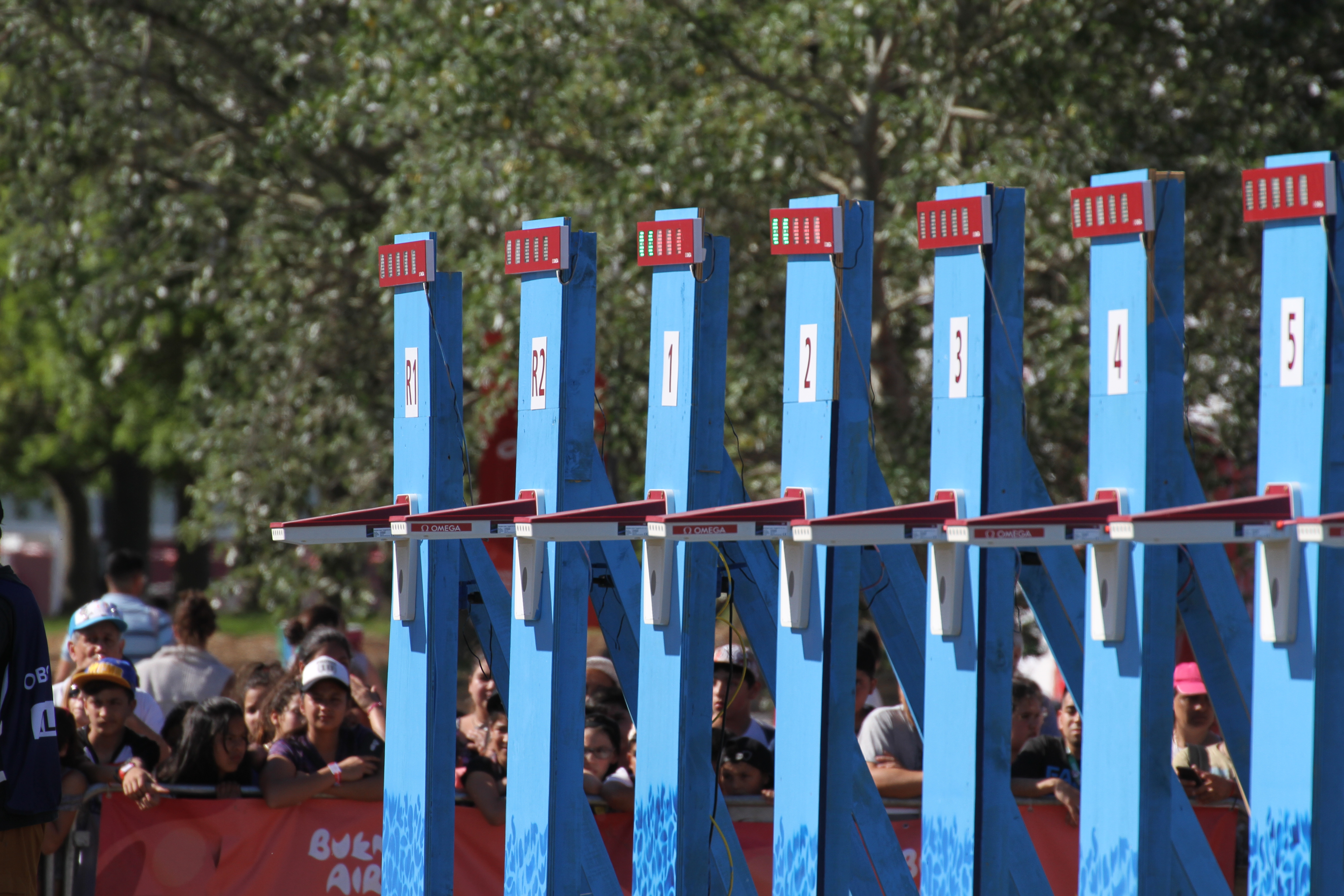
Shooting range

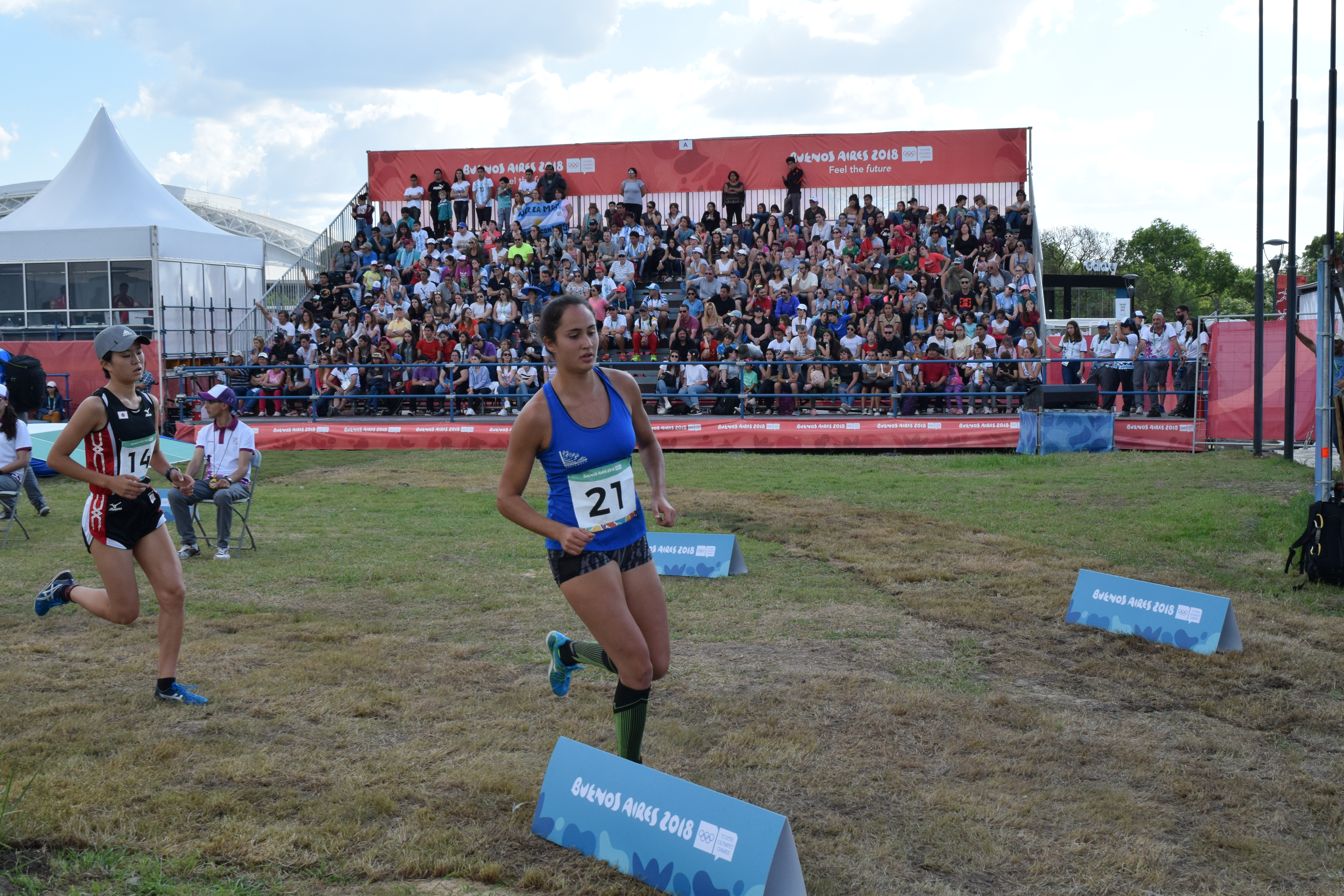
Combined, 2018 Summer Youth Olympics

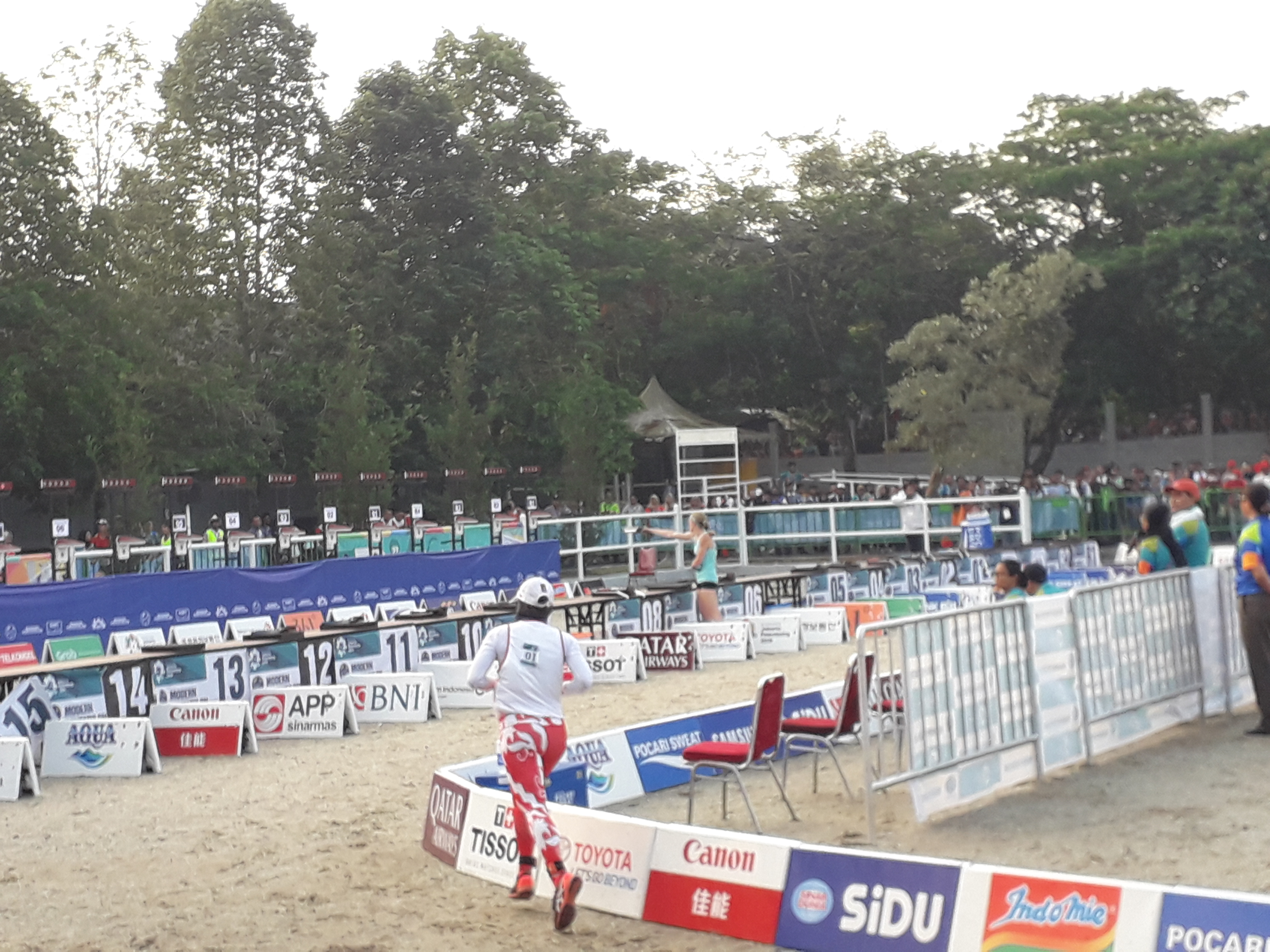
Combined, 2018 Asian Games

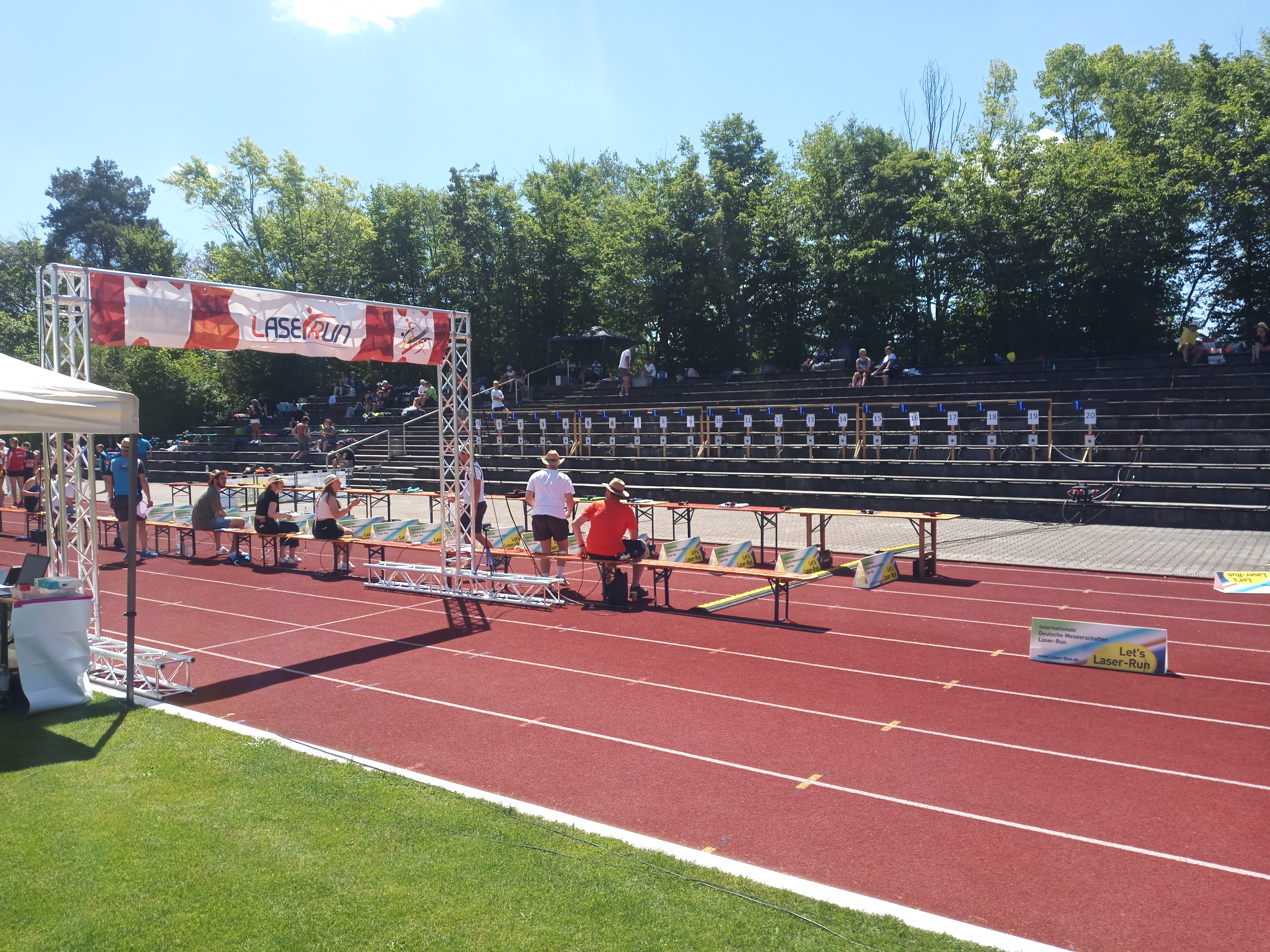
Laser Run, German National Championships 2022
