= Union Internationale de Pentathlon Moderne =

International governing body of modern pentathlon

- Sport: Modern pentathlon
- Jurisdiction: International
- Abbreviation: UIPM
- Founded: 13 August 1948; 78 years ago in London, United Kingdom
- Headquarters: Monaco
- President: Rob Stull

Official website
- www.uipmworld.org

The International Modern Pentathlon Union (French: Union Internationale de Pentathlon Moderne), commonly known by its French acronym UIPM, has been the international governing body of modern pentathlon since its foundation in London in 1948.

Its headquarters are in Monaco and it has 131 members as of 2026. Modern pentathlon was introduced at the fifth Olympiad in Stockholm, Sweden, in 1912, comprising the contemporary sports of pistol shooting, fencing, swimming, horse riding and running, which embraced the spirit of its ancient counterpart.

== Sports ==
UIPM also governs the multi-disciplinary sports laser run, tetrathlon, biathle, triathle and World Schools biathlon, which have been created as development sports aimed at growing global participation rates in UIPM sports and offering more athletes an entry point to modern pentathlon. UIPM is a member of the International Olympic Committee (IOC), the Global Organisation of International Sport Federations (GAISF) and the Federation of International University Sport (FISU), and since joining the International Paralympic Committee it has operated a para-sports programme.

9 sports with first year played:

1. Modern Pentathlon (1912 / 1948)
2. Biathle (1999) (World Schools Biathlon - Running and Swimming)
3. Tetrathlon (1999) - (U19)
4. Masters (2001)
5. Triathle (2013)
6. Para Pentathlon (2014)
7. University Pentathlon (2014)
8. Laser Run (2015)
9. Obstacle (2022)

The International Biathlon Union (IBU) was founded in London on 2 July 1993. This occurred when the National Biathlon Union in London/Heathrow decided to exclude biathlon from the World federation, which it had been part of since 1953, forcing biathlon to form their own international federation. During the congress the new federation elected their executive committee and the 57 existing members of the UIPMB were automatically transferred to the IBU. The IBU settled in Salzburg in June 1999.

== Members ==
UIPM: Africa, Asia, Europe, Oceania, South America and NORCECA (North America, Central America and Caribbean).

1. European Confederation of Modern Pentathlon (ECMP) 1991
2. Confédération Africaine de Pentathlon Modern (CAPM) 2001
3. Asian Modern Pentathlon Confederation (AMPC) 1987
4. North, Central and Caribbean Confederation of Modern Pentathlon (NORCECA)
5. Oceania Modern Pentathlon Confederation
6. Pan American Confederation of Modern Pentathlon 1951

== History ==
=== The Greek Olympic Games Pentathlon ===
The Pentathlon (consisting of running the length of the stadium, jumping, throwing the spear, throwing the discus and wrestling) was introduced for the first time at the 18th Olympiad in 708 BC and held a position of unique importance in the Games. It was considered to be the climax, with the winner ranked as "Victor Ludorum". Admiration for the Ancient Pentathlon was fully shared by the founder of the Modern Olympics, Baron Pierre de Coubertin and from 1909 he tried to have the event re-introduced into the Olympic programme. Pentathlon's moment came two years later at the 14th session of the International Olympic Committee (IOC) in Budapest (HUN) when, as the Baron stated: "the Holy Ghost of sport illuminated my colleagues and they accepted a competition to which I attach great importance".

=== The Modern Pentathlon ===
Modern Pentathlon was introduced at the fifth Olympiad in Stockholm (SWE) 1912, comprising the contemporary sports of pistol shooting, fencing, swimming, horse riding and running, which embraced the spirit of its ancient counterpart. It was De Coubertin's belief that it would be this event, above all others, that "tested a man's moral qualities as much as his physical resources and skills, producing thereby the ideal, complete athlete". This sport was enthusiastically adopted with its inherent demands of courage, co-ordination, physical fitness, self-discipline and flexibility in ever changing circumstances.

=== Administration of Modern Pentathlon ===
Modern Pentathlon was administered directly by the IOC until 1948, when the International Modern Pentathlon Union (UIPM) was founded by a group who elected Tor Wibom as the first UIPM president. Gustaf Dyrssen (1920 Olympic champion) from Sweden took over in 1949 with Sven Thofelt serving as secretary general. Thofelt succeeded Dyrssen in 1960 and served as president for 28 years (IOC Member 1970–1976). In 1960, Biathlon (cross country skiing and rifle shooting) was introduced to the Olympic programme. Biathlon had joined the Union in 1953, and the organization thereafter became the Union Internationale de Pentathlon Moderne et Biathlon (UIPMB). In 1993, an agreement was made to retain as an umbrella body under which the UIPM and the International Biathlon Union (IBU) could act autonomously. Having matured into an organisation capable of continuing on its own, the IBU decided on 26 June 1998 to exist autonomously. Both the UIPM and IBU are recognised by the IOC and GAISF.

== Sports development ==
=== Biathle ===
Designed as a 'Sport for All', Biathle has been practised for over 50 years. Through Biathle the UIPM has established a competition composed of the two fundamental components of Modern Pentathlon and most practised sports in the world – run and swim.

The Biathle has universal appeal. It is inexpensive to organise, simple to understand, can be viewed from a single location, and organised practically anywhere in the world at any time of the year. The Biathle competition begins with a pack start of runners who complete one-half of the total running distance before entering a 50-meter transition area. Athletes then dive into the water and swim the required distance before exiting the water, putting on their shoes and running the second leg. The first person to cross the finish line wins. The race distances vary with the age groups concerned. The first Biathle World Championships took place in Monaco in 1999 and the Biathle World Tour started in 2002 to include up to six competitions in various locations throughout the year. Medals are awarded to the top three athletes in each age group in both the World Championships and the World Tour.

=== World Schools Biathlon ===
In 2005 UIPM launched a new competition linked to the success of Biathle. The event consists of swimming and running. The swimming discipline is conducted in a 25m or 50m pool and the running discipline is conducted preferably on a standardised track (although it can also be carried out on a flat surface if extra care is taken so that the distances are correct). Swimming is conducted first and running is by mass start. The final result is the sum of the swimming and running points. The originality of the World Schools Biathlon is that schools take part in this international competition by entering results directly from their location.

=== Triathle ===
Triathle was officially approved by UIPM in November 2012 as a development sport and, in combination with biathle, is an integral part of UIPM sports development. Through triathle, the UIPM has established a platform to practise modern pentathlon.

Triathle normally begins with a pack start of runners for the first 25m, followed by the first series of five shots with the laser pistol. After the next running leg, the athletes approach the transition area and swim before finishing with a final running leg. The race distances vary with the age groups concerned.

== The five events ==
=== Fencing ===
Fencing is a series of one-touch bouts with épée swords. The fencing event of modern pentathlon is a round-robin tournament, with a single touch deciding each match. The fencing event is held usually in an indoor arena on special strips (pistes) measuring 14 metres (46 ft) long and between 1.5 and 2 metres (1.6 and 2.2 yd) wide. Each competitor has a bout against every other competitor. Bouts last for one minute, the winner being the first fencer to score a hit. If neither scores a hit, both competitors register a defeat, a double hit, doesn't count. Point penalties are awarded for a variety of infringements including hitting the épée on anything other than the opponent to register to a hit, crossing the boundary line with both feet or to avoid a hit, dangerous play and when a fencer turns their back on the opponent. Seventy percent of bouts won correspond to 1000 pentathlon points. Each win is called a victory and each loss a defeat. Each victory over or under the 70% mark is worth a specific point value and this number is in accordance with the number of competitors:

- 22–23 bouts gives ± 40 points
- 24–26 bouts gives ± 36 points
- 27–29 bouts gives ± 32 points
- 30–33 bouts gives ± 28 points
- 34–39 bouts gives ± 24 points

Example: 36 competitions (the number of athletes in a final) means 35 bouts, 70% of 35 bouts = 25 victories = 1000 points, 23 victories are therefore worth 952 Pentathlon points.

=== Swimming ===
Pentathletes usually have a swimming background, which is considered to be the only pentathlon discipline that cannot be taught at a higher level at an older age. For this reason, good swimming standards are considered to be a "precondition" for participation in Modern Pentathlon. The swimming event is a freestyle race over 200 metres (660 ft) for men and women with athletes seeded in heats according to their personal best time. A time of 2:30 earns 1000 Pentathlon points. Every 0.33 seconds is worth ± 4 points and thus the value of each swimming second is worth 12 points. Example: the time 2:32.66 minutes corresponds to 968 points. Forty point penalties are incurred for a false start, failing to touch the wall at the end of a lap or leaving the pool in an incorrect manner as stipulated in the rules.

=== Riding ===
The riding event (equestrian show jumping) included in the Modern Pentathlon competition involves jumping over obstacles of up to 120 cm (47 in) in height. The obstacle course is between 350 and 450 metres (1,150 and 1,480 ft) in length and includes 12 obstacles with one double and one triple, for 15 jumps. Athletes compete on horses provided by the organisers, which are selected from a random draw. For warm-up and preparation purposes, athletes are allowed to ride their allocated horse for 20 minutes and to have up to five trial jumps in the warm-up arena provided. Pentathletes are given 20 minutes to inspect the course at any time during the competition programme according to the organiser's schedule. The athlete has a specific time limit in which to complete the course, and the time limit is set according to its length. A clear round in time allowed (varies between 1 minute and 1.17 minutes) gives the rider 1200 pentathlon points. For each mistake the rider loses points. Examples of penalties given are 20 points for knock-down and 40 points for every refusal or disobedience: but any disobedience leading to the knocking down of an obstacle gives 60 points deduction. After two refusals to jump, the rider must try to jump the next obstacle. A fall of the rider from the horse or if they both fall is a 60-point penalty. After two falls, the riding will be terminated. In case of riding terminations for every obstacle not jumped, the rider loses 100 points. The most common cases of riding terminations are: Wrong course, second fall, exceeding the time limit that is double of the time allowed and retiring from the competition.

Each second over the time limit means a deduction of four points. The maximum time is the double of the standard time. If the rider is slower than the time allowed, the riding is terminated Riders must jump the obstacles in order. Riders must wear protective headgear and a riding jacket and can use a whip and spurs: Horses hoods and blinkers are prohibited.

=== Laser Run ===
In 2008, the UIPM Congress passed a motion to change the competition format of the modern pentathlon to combine the shoot and run disciplines. This is now known as the "Laser Run" and is the final event of the day's competition. In the individual competition for men and women at Senior, Junior and Youth A levels, athletes start with a handicap start, approximately 25 metres (82 ft) run, to a shooting range where they are required to hit five targets (time limit 50 seconds) before beginning an 800-metre (2,600 ft) run. This is repeated three further times for a total of 20 targets and 3,200 metres (10,500 ft) run. Two thousand (2000) pentathlon points are awarded for a time of 12.30 minutes. Each second faster or slower than the prescribed time is worth ±4 points.

The laser-run is also included in relay competitions in teams of two or three pentathletes. However, the format differs slightly in that only two series of the course are repeated (five targets down (time limit 50 seconds for youth); 800 metres (2,600 ft) run; five targets down (time limit 50 seconds for youth); 800 metres (2,600 ft) run) for each of the pentathletes. For team of three athletes, 2000 points are awarded for a time 25.00 minutes. Each second faster or slower than the prescribed time is worth ±4 points. For team of two athletes, 2000 points are awarded for a time 17.00 minutes. Each second faster or slower than the prescribed time is worth ±4 points.

Within the laser-run the shooting takes place with a completely safe and environmentally friendly laser pistol, fired at a target from a distance of 10 metres (33 ft). The shooting competition is in four series; each series consists of hitting five targets with an unlimited number of shots in a maximum time of 50 seconds on a target of dimension 59.5 mm (2.34 in). If after 50 seconds, one or more targets have not been hit (or the athlete did not hit five times the valid zone), the pentathlete can start on the running leg without being penalised. Only after having hit five targets using an unlimited number of shots in the time limit of 50 seconds can the pentathlete start from the shooting station to perform the first running leg of 800 metres (2,600 ft). After the first leg, the pentathletes return to their shooting stations, where they must reset their target, (only the pentathlete is authorised to reset their target) and then start the second shooting series that consists of hitting five targets using an unlimited number of shots but in the time limit of 50 seconds. The pentathlete repeats the same procedure for the second shooting series and second running leg of 800 metres (2,600 ft). After the fourth shooting series the pentathletes perform the fourth and final running leg of 800 metres (2,600 ft) to the finish line.

The laser-run uses electronic targets which consist of one black single aim and five green/red lamps indicators.

== List of presidents ==
- Gustaf Dyrssen (1948–1960)
- Sven Thofelt (1960–1988)
- Igor Novikov (1988–1992)
- Klaus Schormann (1992–2024)
- Rob Stull (2024–present)

== Modern pentathlon competitions ==
=== Olympic Games ===
From 1912 to 1980 the Olympic Modern Pentathlon competition was held over five days with one event per day. Between 1984 and 1992, the competition was held over four days with either running and shooting or swimming and shooting on the same day. For the Atlanta Olympic Games in 1996, the competition was a one-day event in which 32 men who qualified via pre-Olympic competitions participated. In 1998, the UIPM received approval for women to compete in the Sydney 2000 Olympic Games and so 24 men and 24 women competed in individual competition and for the first time in history, the Pentathlon venues were 96% sold out. UIPM subsequently received an increase in the quota and in Athens 2004, 32 men and 32 women competed and both competitions were 100% sold-out. Following this success, UIPM received in February 2006 a further increase in quota from the IOC Executive Board – in Beijing 2008 Olympic Games, 36 men & 36 Women took part in the Olympic Modern Pentathlon event. The same quota has also been confirmed for the 2012 London Olympic Games. In the 2020 Tokyo Olympic Games there was controversy when a number of horses refused to comply during the horse jumping stage in the event.

=== World Championships ===
Senior, Junior and Under 19 World Championships (formerly known as Youth A) take place annually, with male and female athletes competing in individual, team and relay events. From 2018 the Senior World Championships will be renamed as the UIPM Pentathlon World Championships. The Junior category is for pentathletes aged 23 and under, while the Under 19 World Championships is the only one that adopts the Tetrathlon format, where riding is omitted. Athletes compete in qualification groups for the right to take part in the final, which can include up to 36 athletes. Individual medals and prize money are awarded as well as team medals which are decided by adding the top three individual team members' scores together. Relay events involve two athletes competing in turn throughout the various disciplines. A mixed relay has been included since 2009 in all World Championships and World Cups, and the Youth Olympic Games mixed relay uniquely gives athletes from different countries the opportunity to compete for medals in unison.

1. World Modern Pentathlon Championships - Since 1949
2. World U24 Modern Pentathlon Championships (U24) - Since 2012
3. World Junior Modern Pentathlon Championships (U21) - Since 1976
4. World Youth Modern Pentathlon Championships (U19 and U17) - Since 1997
5. World Masters Modern Pentathlon Championships (30-39 (30+), 40-49 (40+), 50-59 (50+), 60-69 (60+), and 70+ in Pentathlon and Tetrathlon, also Para events) - Since 2001
6. World Para Modern Pentathlon Championships
7. Biathle World Championships (Biathle#Biathle World Championships in some ages) - Since 1999
8. Triathle World Championships (Triathle#Triathle World Championships in some ages) - Since 2013
9. Biathle World Tours
10. Triathle World Tours
11. World Laser Run Championships (Part of World Modern Pentathlon Championships)
12. FISU World University Modern Pentathlon Championships

=== World Masters Championships ===
The World Masters Modern Pentathlon Championships divide competitors into age groups with 10-year spans: 30-39 (30+), 40-49 (40+), 50-59 (50+), 60-69 (60+), and 70+. These age groups are for both men and women, separated by gender according to the competition rules. The key date for determining which age group a competitor belongs to is January 1 of the year of their birth, according to the competition rules. Athletes can choose to compete in a lower age group but with a reduction of handicap points. They must declare their choice at the time of official registration, and once registered, they cannot switch to a different age group without permission from the UIPM Technical Delegate.

=== World Para Championships ===
UIPM adopted Para-Sport Regulations in 2017 and launched a recruitment drive for classifiers, according to the Union Internationale de Pentathlon Moderne (UIPM). The first sport introduced is Para Laser Run.

=== Pentathlon World Cup ===
A World Cup series for both men and women has been organised since 1990. Each year, between 4 and 6 World Cup competitions and a World Cup Final are organised, and the whole package is called the World Cup, renamed in 2018 as the UIPM Pentathlon World Cup. The best 36 athletes qualify for the World Cup Final via a league table constructed from their three best results at World Cup competitions. Prize money is also available.

=== Continental championships ===
Continental championships are organised by the Confederations of UIPM: Africa, Asia, Europe, Oceania, South America and NORCECA (North America, Central America and Caribbean).

1. European Modern Pentathlon Championships from 1987.
2. African Modern Pentathlon Championships from 2001.
3. Asian & Oceanian Modern Pentathlon Championships from 1986.
4. Pan American Modern Pentathlon Championships from 1951.

== Athletes ==
See Category:Modern pentathletes by nationality

=== Olympic Pentathletes ===
See Category:Olympic modern pentathletes

== See also ==
- List of shooting sports organizations
- World Obstacle
