= Modern pentathlon =

Five-event Olympic sport

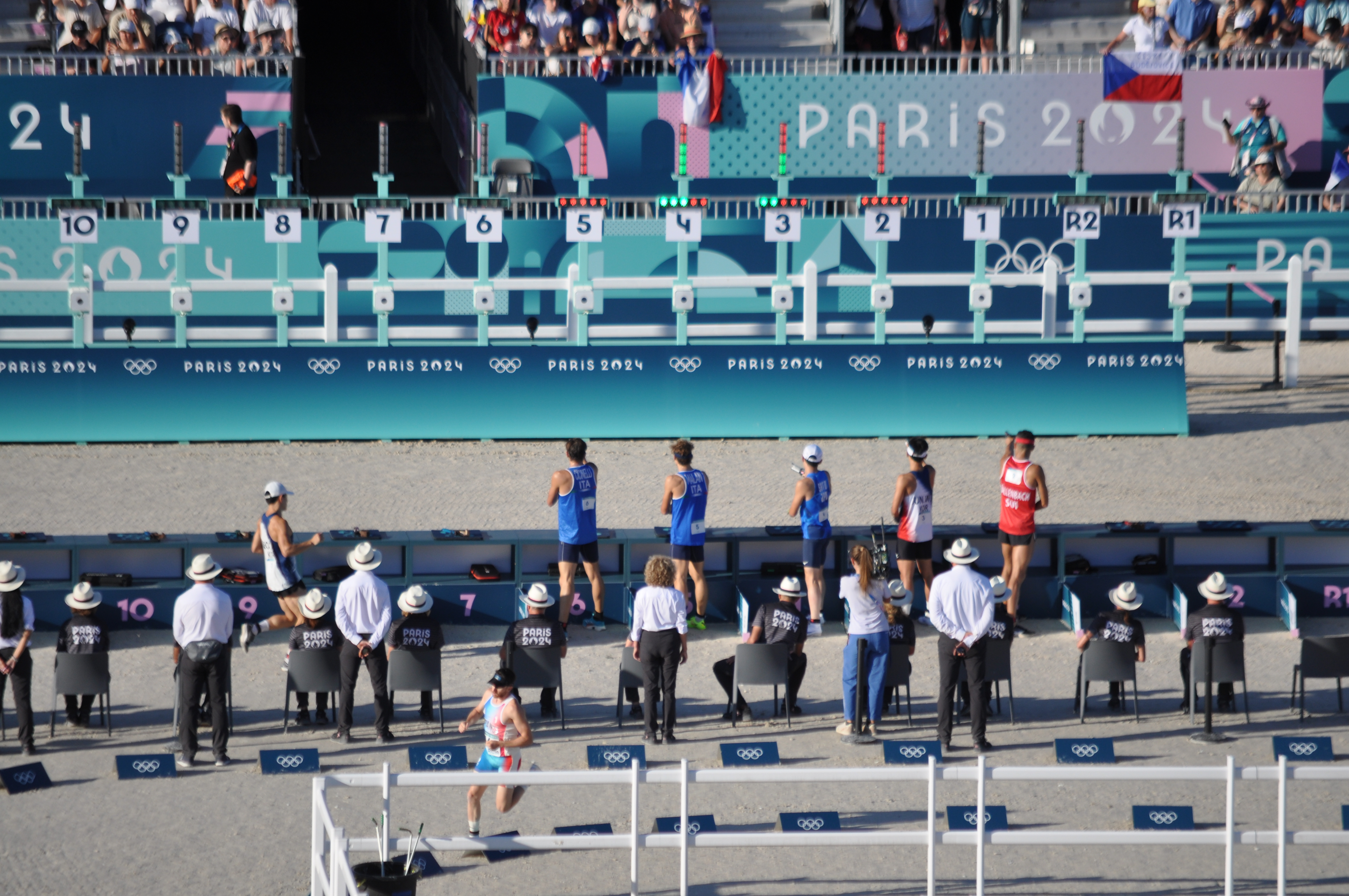
- Highest governing body: Union Internationale de Pentathlon Moderne (UIPM)

Characteristics
- Contact: Semi-contact
- Type: Fencing, swimming, obstacle racing (formerly show jumping), shooting, and running sport

Presence
- Olympic: Part of Summer Olympic programme since 1912

Pictogram for Modern pentathlon at the Summer Olympics

The modern pentathlon is an Olympic multisport that consists of five events: fencing (one-touch épée followed by direct elimination), freestyle swimming, obstacle course racing, laser pistol shooting, and cross country running.

The sport was first held in 1912, inspired by the traditional pentathlon held during the ancient Olympics, and designed to model skills needed by a soldier of that time. It has been a continuous part of the Summer Olympics since 1912, and a world championship has been held annually since 1949.

The rules of the modern pentathlon have changed several times, especially in recent decades. Most notably, equestrian show jumping was one of the five events for more than 100 years, but was replaced by obstacle course racing in senior competitions as of 2025. The event has been condensed from five days to one day, and further down to two hours. The latest structure, as of the 2024 Olympics, consisted of separate events for fencing, swimming, and equestrian, points from which determine each athlete's starting time in the final event, a combined laser-run. Egypt has achieved consistent success across multiple age-group world championships, culminating in Ahmed El-Gendy winning the first Olympic gold medal by an African pentathlete at the 2024 Summer Olympics. Hungary has won the most Olympic gold medals after Michelle Gulyas became its second women's Olympic champion at Paris 2024.

The initial program of the 2028 Olympics did not include modern pentathlon, but the 141st International Olympic Committee Session in Mumbai, India, voted to approve the inclusion of the sport with its new format where obstacle racing replaces equestrian.

Modern pentathlon's governing body, Union Internationale de Pentathlon Moderne (UIPM), administers the international sport with member federations in more than 130 countries.

== Format ==
The format of the modern pentathlon has changed frequently through the sport's history. Obstacle course racing will make its debut in the 2028 Los Angeles Olympics as part of the modern pentathlon, replacing the equestrian show jumping event at the Olympics. This shift aims to modernize the sport and make it more accessible and relatable. Described below is the format that will be used:

- Fencing, ranking round: In the first round of the fencing, every athlete faces every other athlete in one-on-one fencing bouts. Bouts use an electric épée with the target being the whole body, and end after one hit, though if neither athlete scores a hit within one minute the bout ends with both registering a defeat. Athletes that win 70 percent of their bouts score 250 points; each win above is worth 5 more points, each below is 5 points less.
- Obstacle: Athletes compete head-to-head over a 60–70 meter course featuring eight obstacles. Obstacles include elements such as steps, big wheels, walls, rings, balance beams, and monkey bars. Each athlete must traverse the course in their lane without touching the ground outside designated areas. Falls, failures to complete an obstacle, or stepping outside of lanes result in penalties or disqualification. Athletes' finishing times are converted into points toward their overall modern pentathlon score, with each second worth three points.
- Swimming: This is a single 100 meter freestyle swim. A time of 1:10.00 through 1:10.19 scores 250 points; each fifth of a second faster gains 1 point while each fifth of a second slower loses 1 point.
- Fencing, bonus round: In the second round of fencing, athletes are ordered based on the first round's results. The last-place athlete goes against the next-placed athlete. The winner receives 2 points and advances to compete against the next best-ranked athlete; the loser is eliminated from this round of fencing (for double-defeats, the winner of the bout is the athlete who was higher-ranked going into the round). This continues until all but one athlete is eliminated. (The athlete who enters this round in the top of the fencing order can only have one bout; if they won the fencing ranking round they can earn 4 points if they win that bout.)
- Laser-run: At this final event, athletes' starting times are determined by their total scores from the first three events, so that the highest scorer starts first, and each successive athlete then starts with a delay of one second for each point by which they trail the leader. Athletes run 3000 meters, stopping five times to shoot at targets with a laser pistol. In each round, they must remain at the target until they score five hits (with an unlimited number of shots) or until 50 seconds have elapsed. Final placement in the overall modern pentathlon is determined by order across the finish line.

At the 2024 Olympics, the event was run twice for each gender. The first, the semifinals, determined which athletes could participate in the finals. The finals then determines the medallists. However, the fencing ranking round was only run once and its results were used for both the semifinals and finals.

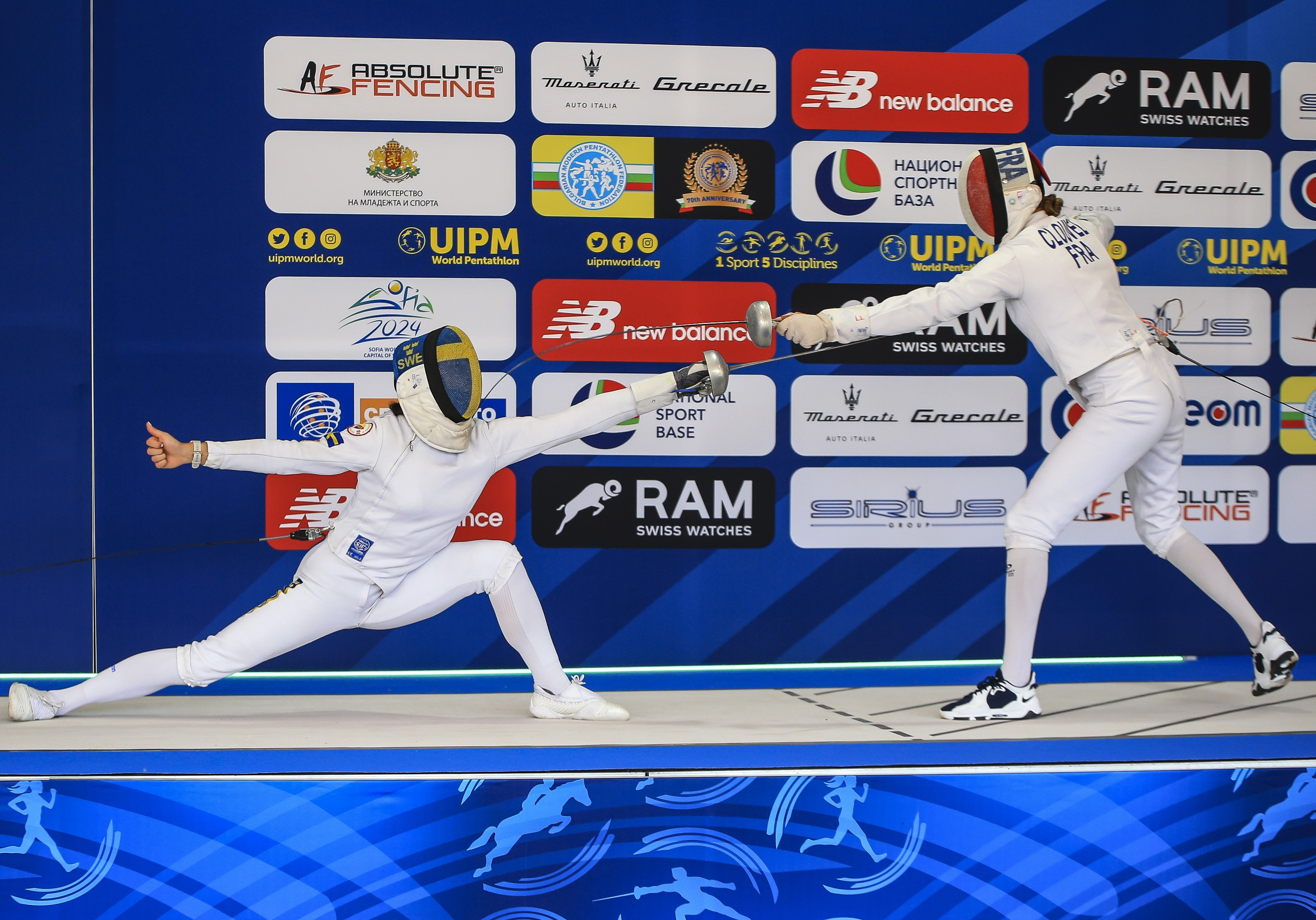
Fencing

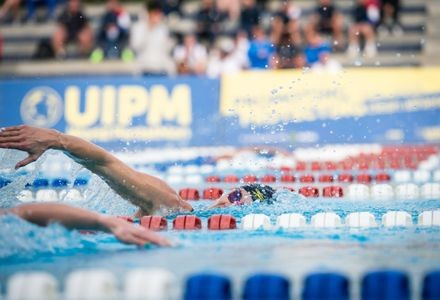
Swimming

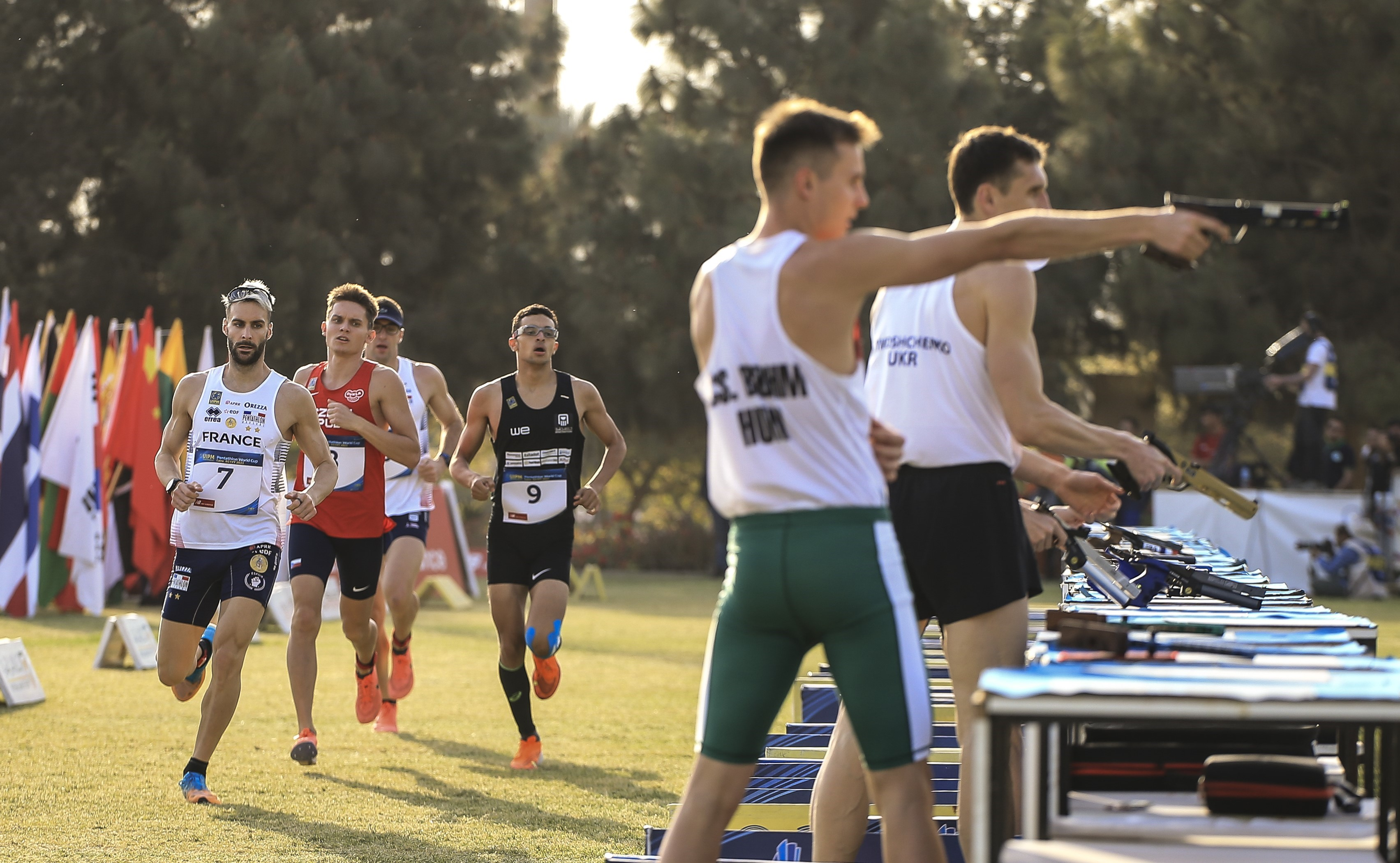
Shooting

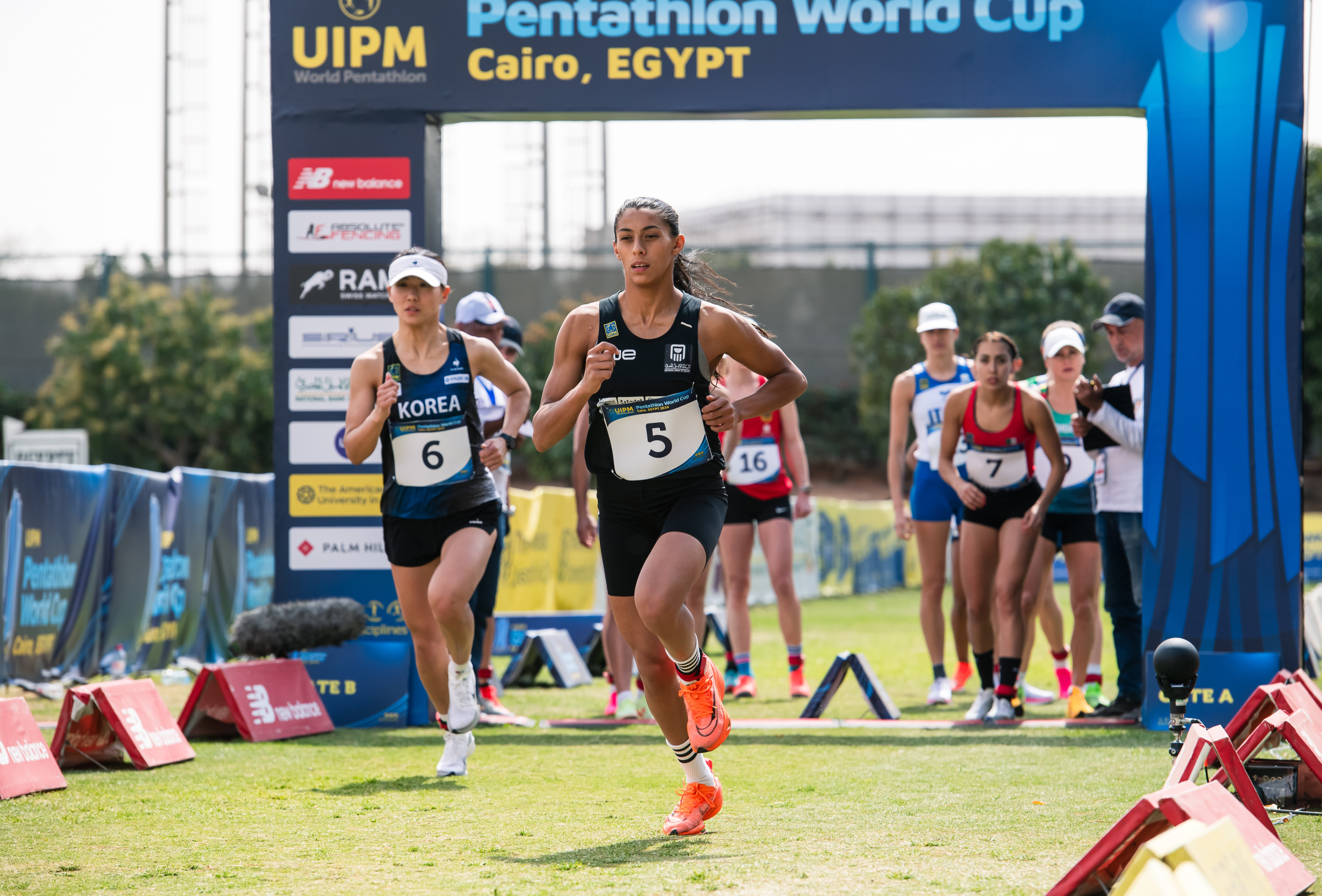
Running

Obstacle racing

== History ==
=== Creation ===
Most sources state that the creator of the modern pentathlon was Baron Pierre de Coubertin, the founder of the modern Olympic Games. One alternative view is provided by researcher Sandra Heck, who concluded that Viktor Balck, the President of the Organizing Committee for the 1912 Games, made use of the long tradition of Swedish military multi-sports events to create the modern pentathlon.

The name derives from the Greek πένταθλον (péntathlon) "contest of five [events]". The addition of modern to the name distinguishes it from the original pentathlon of the ancient Olympic Games, which consisted of the stadion foot race, wrestling, long jump, javelin, and discus. The location of the first Olympic Games was Olympia in 708 BCE. As the events of the ancient pentathlon were modeled on the skills of the ideal soldier to defend a fortification of that time, Coubertin created the contest to simulate the experience of a 19th-century cavalry soldier behind enemy lines: he must ride an unfamiliar horse, fight enemies with pistol and sword, swim, and run to return to his own soldiers.

=== Olympic Games ===
The event was first held at the 1912 Olympic Games and has been on the Olympic program continuously ever since. It was a male-only event until the 2000 Games, when an event for women was added. This enabled the sport to achieve gender parity 24 years before the Olympic Games managed this as a whole.

A men's team event was added to the Olympic Games in 1952, and was included in all Summer Olympics until its last appearance in 1992.

Originally, the competition took place over four or five days. In 1996, a one-day format was adopted in a major shift towards the sport's more audience-friendly future. The switch to a one-day format was criticised for changing the steady character of modern pentathlon to a more fast-paced competition. To further enhance the experience for spectators, the UIPM proposed that all five events should be held in a single venue. This was planned for the 2016 Summer Olympics but held for the first time at the 2020 Summer Olympics. For the 2024 Summer Olympics, the format is further condensed into two hours. Further innovation and streamlining to maximise the sport's appeal, including changes to the fencing event, is planned for the 2028 Summer Olympics in Los Angeles.

Modern pentathlon is also part of the Youth Olympic Games since 2010.

Modern pentathlon, despite its long Olympic history, has had to justify its inclusion in the modern Olympic Games several times. On February 11, 2013, in Lausanne, the IOC confirmed modern pentathlon once again as one of the 25 core sports of the Olympic program through to 2020. Nine years later, the IOC confirmed its place on the program for the 2028 Summer Olympics in Los Angeles.

=== Governance ===
Until 1948 there was no official international federation for modern pentathlon, so an IOC committee was set up for the sport making use of the expertise of IOC members. The governing body, Union Internationale de Pentathlon Moderne (UIPM) was founded in 1948 in Sandhurst, England during the London 1948 Olympic Games.

=== International competitions ===
A world championship has been held every year since 1949. The competitions now include men and women's individual and team events together with relay events for men and women and, since 2010, a mixed relay event. After much lobby work of the president of the German Modern Pentathlon Federation, Wilhelm Henze, women were for the first time admitted at the world championships in 1977, and at the official world championships in 1981.

The Modern Pentathlon World Cup is an annual series of modern pentathlon competitions, with four events taking place in the regular season and the top 36 female and top 36 male athletes qualifying to compete in the World Cup Final. It was first held in 1999.

== Format changes over time ==
Modern pentathlon has been the subject of numerous changes since its creation.

=== Fencing ===
In 2015 — and for the first time in the 2016 Summer Olympics — a system of an additional bonus round was added to épée fencing in international competitions. Before that, there was only the round-robin format.

From 2025, after a round-robin system in the qualification stage, the finals feature a direct elimination stage where pairings are based on round-robin results. The bonus round was eliminated.

=== Swimming ===
Until the 2000 Olympics, the distance for swimming was 300 metres; at that time it was changed to 200 metres.

In 2026, the distance was further reduced to 100 metres.

=== Riding ===
The distance of the cross-country riding event was reduced from 5 km to 4 km in 1972. For the 1988 Summer Olympics cross-country riding was changed to show jumping.

This event was replaced by an obstacle course event after the 2024 Olympics, and horse riding is no longer part of Modern Pentathlon.

=== Shooting and running ===
From 1912 to 1988 regular pistols or later sport pistols were used for shooting. From 1989 until 2009, the shooting discipline involved firing a 4.5 mm (.177 cal) air pistol in the standing position from 10 metres distance at a stationary target. The format was that of the 10 metre air pistol competition: each competitor had 20 shots, with 40 seconds allowed for each shot. Beginning with the World Cup events in 2011, in a move designed to improve the safety and sustainability of the sport, laser pistols were used instead of pistols with actual projectiles. At the same time, unlimited shots were allowed for each timed shooting round. There is a slight delay between the trigger pull and the laser firing, simulating the time it would take for a pellet to clear the muzzle. Air pistols with laser transmitters were introduced during the transitional period and are still in use. Purpose-built laser pistols are developed and commonly used since the middle of the 2010s. Laser pistols and targets have to be certified by the UIPM. The standard target dimension is a 250 mm diameter circle, with a target valid zone of 59.5 mm.

Until 2000, the running distance was 4 kilometres. At the 2000 Olympics, the running discipline was shortened to a 3 km cross-country run.

In 2008, the UIPM Congress passed a motion to combine the shoot and run disciplines. This is now known as the "combined event" and is the final event of the competition. In 2009, the combined event consisted of three 1000 m laps, each preceded by laser shooting at five targets in 70 seconds or less. From the start of the 2013 season, the laser-run (term coined in 2016) was changed to consist of four 800 m laps (increasing the distance to 3.2 kilometres) each preceded by laser shooting at five targets in 50 seconds or less. This change was intended to restore some of the importance of the shooting skill felt to have been lost in the original 2009 combined event. After the 2020 Summer Olympics (postponed to 2021), the run was further modified to a new model of five 600 m laps.

The laser run is organized as a pursuit race: athletes start with a handicap based on the summed points gathered in the previous disciplines; as such it determines the overall outcome of the modern pentathlon event. The rest of the field face a one-second handicap for each pentathlon point by which they trail the leader. This ensures that the first person to cross the finish line wins the Gold medal.

The laser-run has been criticized as altering too radically the nature of the skills required by athletes. The New York Times asked whether the name ought to be changed to "tetrathlon" given that two of the five disciplines had been combined into a single event. Laser-run has also become a sport in its own right with para athlete participation and world championships of its own. It is the summer equivalent of the biathlon winter sport, which involves skiing and shooting.

=== Overall scoring and operation ===
Scoring was originally done by a points-for-place system with the lowest score winning. Since the 1954 World Cup points tables are used for each of the five events and points are added for the final score. This scoring was first used in the 1956 Summer Olympics. The five disciplines were held on a single day — instead of four to six — from the 1996 Summer Olympics onwards. In the 2024 Olympics, all five disciplines – other than the fencing ranking round – will all take place in the same venue within 90 minutes.

=== Replacement of riding with obstacle course racing ===
The riding discipline attracted criticism during the 2020 Summer Olympics after multiple athletes in the women's event struggled to control their randomly-assigned horses. This culminated in the German team's coach, Kim Raisner, being removed from the event after striking a horse with her fist. Following the Games, in November 2021 it was reported that the UIPM was opening consultations on the proposed replacement of riding with another discipline. The decision was ratified during the UIPM's Congress on 27 November 2021, with the changes intended to be implemented for the 2028 Summer Olympics. According to critics of the decision, the UIPM voted for the change without consulting athletes, claiming force majeure.

The decision was met with criticism from various athletes and bodies, who considered riding to be integral to modern pentathlon. Some also accused the UIPM of hindering debate in favor of riding during the congress. More than 650 modern pentathletes signed a letter calling for the UIPM executive board to resign in November 2021. A group known as "Pentathlon United" called for the IOC to investigate the UIPM's governance, and proposed a plan to maintain riding with rule changes to bring them in line with those of the International Federation for Equestrian Sports (FEI), and a focus on animal welfare.

In May 2022, the UIPM announced it would hold an obstacle racing test event alongside the 2022 Modern Pentathlon World Cup final in Ankara, citing that it had received the most support out of the over 60 disciplines proposed, was more cost-effective, would help make the event more attractive to a younger audience, and was "compatible with the DNA of modern pentathlon". The competition course was developed with input from World Obstacle and Japanese broadcaster TBS (producer of the sports competition series Sasuke, whose format has been widely exported under the title Ninja Warrior), and the event featured a mix of athletes from both the obstacle racing and modern pentathlon communities. Australian gymnast Olivia Vivian—a grand finalist of Australian Ninja Warrior—won the gold in the women's competition.

On 9 July 2022, Pentathlon United shared a survey of 213 responses from 40 countries, claiming that 68.5% of the respondents were current athletes, that indicated more than 92% of current modern pentathlon participants wanted to preserve the equestrian discipline as part of the sport. The group stated, "A total of 74.18% chose the reformed version of equestrian, which puts horse welfare among the central themes, while concern over the cost and accessibility of the equestrian discipline is also acknowledged in the 16-point plan." Of those polled, Pentathlon United claimed that only athletes from the United Kingdom showed any support for an obstacle race, with athletes from the United States overwhelmingly voting for a reformed version of equestrian sport.

In October 2022, modern pentathlon's elected Athletes Committee launched a campaign entitled #OurFuture, highlighting the views of pentathletes in favour of the change. Athletes such as Olympic silver medallists Elodie Clouvel (France) and Ahmed Elgendy (Egypt) supported the transition when participating in a media conference at UIPM Headquarters in Monaco. They were joined by Athletes Committee representatives including the group's Chair, Yasser Hefny OLY (Egypt), Jamie Cooke (Great Britain) and Natalya Coyle OLY (Ireland), as well as former Pan American champion Tamara Vega (Mexico).

In November 2022, the UIPM Congress voted 69–11 in favor of replacing riding with obstacle course racing; an associated motion established that the changes would take effect for junior competition in 2023. The 2023 and 2024 junior world championships duly took place with obstacle in place of equestrian. The new format's implementation at the senior level will be formalised after the 2024 Summer Olympics.

On 22 June 2023, the UIPM shared a poll of 1,500 Americans by YouGov that they commissioned in support of their decision to replace riding with obstacle course racing, citing that the survey showed that "45% of Gen Z and 41% of Millennials more likely to watch the Olympics on television if it featured a ninja-style obstacle race...taken as a percentage of the U.S. population, this would equate to nearly 45 million more people watching the Games". The UIPM also stated, "More than two-thirds (37%) of survey respondents said they would be more likely to watch the new-look Modern Pentathlon at the Olympic Games, and 46% of those cited enjoying ninja-style obstacle races as the reason, with 34% describing the reason for their answer: 'I think the Modern Pentathlon needs to embrace change'." The article also indirectly referenced the popular TV show American Ninja Warrior.

Іn August 2023 during the 2023 UIPM Pentathlon and Laser Run World Championships, the UIPM signed a memorandum of understanding with World Obstacle to collaborate on the integration of obstacle racing into the modern pentathlon at the senior level; UIPM president Klaus Schormann stated that the federation was "want[ing] to bring a different challenge to the Olympic Movement, to be more urban and provide something that young generations will love." The MoU was criticised by Pentathlon United, who questioned World Obstacle's finances (in particular, being funded solely by one person with no other commercial revenue). In October 2023, during the 141st IOC Session in Mumbai, the IOC voted to reinstate modern pentathlon with its new format for the 2028 Summer Olympics.

== Popularity ==
In 2021, modern pentathlon consistently had the least TV viewers of all Olympic sports, and also ranked at the bottom for internal Olympic measurements of social engagement. The Greek modern pentathlon coach said, "We are an Olympic sport that is on the edge... We're very, very low down, if not bottom, in a lot of ratings like ticket sales, viewership, and participation". Sports academic Jörg Krieger wrote in 2022 that the sport "suffered from a lack of participation in the sport, as well as [having] limited public interest". However, KXAS-TV reporter Stephanie de Lancey called the compressed 90-minute format used at the 2024 Olympics "fast and action-packed" and said the replacement of show jumping for 2028 was "a way for the sport to evolve in the 21st century."

A 2021 study by Quartz concluded that modern pentathlon (in the form that included equestrian) was the most expensive Olympic sport for entry-level costs. It found that to start modern pentathlon cost US$13,580 for equipment and facilities. Most other Olympic sports examined cost less than $500 to start in.

== See also ==
- List of Olympic medalists in modern pentathlon
- Modern pentathlon at the Summer Olympics
- Pentathlon – Combined sporting event of five contests
- World Modern Pentathlon Championships – International modern pentathlon competition
