= 2002 in modern pentathlon =

This article lists the main modern pentathlon events and their results for 2002.

== International modern pentathlon events ==
- June 27: 2002 CISM Modern Pentathlon Championships in (Czech Republic) Hradec Králové
  - Individual winners: (Ukraine) Vadym Tkachuk (m) / (Latvia) Jeļena Rubļevska (f)
  - Men's Team Relay winner: (Belarus) Mihail Prokopenko
- October 10: 2002 Asian Games in (South Korea) Busan
  - Individual winners: (South Korea) KIM Mi-sub (m) / (Kazakhstan) Lada Jiyenbalanova (f)

== World modern pentathlon events ==
- July 15: 2002 World Modern Pentathlon Championships in (United States) San Francisco
  - Individual winners: (Czech Republic) Michal Sedlecky (m) / (Hungary) Bea Simoka (f)
  - Men's Team Relay winners: Germany (Carsten Niederberger, Eric Walther, & Sebastian Dietz)
  - Women's Team Relay winners: Czech Republic (Lucie Grolichová, Alexandra Kalinovská, & Olga Zavorkova)
- September 23: 2002 World Junior Modern Pentathlon Championships in (Australia) Sydney
  - Note: The junior men's event was not concluded properly. No idea about who was the champion here.
  - Junior Women's Individual winner: (Russia) Olessia Velitchko
  - Junior Men's Team Relay winners: France (John Zakrzewski, Arnaud Denfert, & Cedric Pla)
  - Junior Women's Team Relay winners: Russia (Vera Feshchenko & Olessia Velitchko)

== Continental modern pentathlon events ==
- Note: There is a discrepancy between Santo Domingo (June) and Rio de Janeiro (October), in terms of the Pan American MP host city here.
- April 17: 2002 European Youth "A" Modern Pentathlon Championships in (Greece) Athens
  - Youth Winner: (Hungary) Ádám Marosi
- April 25: 2002 South American Modern Pentathlon Championships in (Argentina) Buenos Aires
  - Men's Individual winner: (Mexico) Horacio de la Vega
  - Men's Team Relay winners: Chile (Cristian Bustos, Javier Tisi, & Cristian Carrasco)
- May 14: 2002 Asian Modern Pentathlon Championships in Tokyo
  - Individual winners: (China) Qian Zhenhua (m) / (China) Dong Le'an (f)
  - Men's Team Relay winners: Japan (Mazura Okada, Yoshinori Mizouchi, & Shoji Kurousu)
  - Women's Team Relay winners: Kazakhstan (Lada Jiyenbalanova, Lyudmila Shumilova, & Natalia Uvarova)
- June 14 & 15: 2002 NORCECA (Pan American) Modern Pentathlon Championships in (Dominican Republic) Santo Domingo
  - Women's Individual winner: (Mexico) Miranda Dominguez
  - Men's Team Relay winners: Mexico (5 different team members here)
  - Women's Team Relay winner: (Puerto Rico) Cynthia Soto
- June 18: 2002 European Modern Pentathlon Championships in (Czech Republic) Ústí nad Labem
  - Individual winners: (Czech Republic) Libor Capalini (m) / (Italy) Claudia Corsini (f)
  - Men's Team Relay winners: Lithuania (Edvinas Krungolcas, Tadas Zemaitis, & Andrejus Zadneprovskis)
  - Women's Team Relay winners: Italy (Sara Bertoli, Claudia Cerutti, & Claudia Corsini)
- July 2: 2002 European Junior Modern Pentathlon Championships in Budapest
  - Junior Individual winners: (Germany) Steffen Gebhardt (m) / (Russia) Tatiana Gorliak (f)
  - Junior Men's Team Relay winners: France (Cedric Pla, John Zakrzewski, & Arnaud Denfert)
  - Junior Women's Team Relay winners: Hungary (Eva Sasvari, Reka Kling, & Vivien Mathe)
- July 26: 2002 European Youth "B" Modern Pentathlon Championships in (France) Eaubonne
  - Youth Individual winners: (Spain) Jaime López (m) / (Russia) Aleksandra Sadovnikova (f)
  - Youth Men's Team Relay winners: Poland (Lukasz Lis, Radoslaw Slomian, & Szymon Staśkiewicz)
  - Youth Women's Team Relay winners: Hungary (Eszter Tóth, Ildiko Hidvegi, & Katalin Prill)
- October 24: 2002 Pan American Modern Pentathlon Championships in (Brazil) Rio de Janeiro
  - Individual winners: (Mexico) Andres Sanches (m) / (United States) Monica Fling (f)

== 2002 Modern Pentathlon World Cup ==
- Note: The MPWC #1 event here has two men as champions by the UIPM.
- March 14: MPWC #1 in Mexico City
  - Men's Individual winners: (Hungary) Viktor Horváth (#1) / (Hungary) Ádám Marosi (#2)
  - Women's Individual winner: (Greece) Katalin Partics
- April 4: MPWC #2 in (Spain) Madrid
  - Individual winners: (Hungary) Viktor Horváth (m) / (United Kingdom) Georgina Harland (f)
- April 25: MPWC #3 for Women in (Hungary) Székesfehérvár
  - Winner: (Hungary) Zsuzsanna Vörös
- April 28: MPWC #3 for Men in (Germany) Sindelfingen
  - Winner: (Czech Republic) Libor Capalini
- May 9: MPWC #4 for Men in (Hungary) Budapest
  - Winner: (Lithuania) Edvinas Krungolcas
- June 1: MPWC #4 for Women in (Poland) Warsaw
  - Winner: (Hungary) Bea Simoka
- August 11: MPWC #5 (final) in (Hungary) Budapest
  - Individual winners: (Lithuania) Andrejus Zadneprovskis (m) / (Italy) Claudia Corsini (f)
