= 2003 in modern pentathlon =

This article lists the main modern pentathlon events and their results for 2003.

== International modern pentathlon events ==
- August 11 & 12: 2003 Pan American Games in (Dominican Republic) Santo Domingo
  - Individual winners: (United States) Vakhtang Iagorashvili (m) / (United States) Anita Allen (f)
- December 6 & 7: 2003 Military World Games (CISM) in (Italy) Catania
  - Individual winners: (Italy) Enrico dell Amore (m) / (China) Dong Le'an (f)

== World modern pentathlon events ==
- July 14: 2003 World Modern Pentathlon Championships in (Italy) Pesaro
  - Individual winners: (Germany) Eric Walther (m) / (Hungary) Zsuzsanna Vörös (f)
  - Men's Team Relay winners: Hungary (Ákos Kállai, Gábor Balogh, & Viktor Horváth)
  - Women's Team Relay winners: Hungary (Bea Simoka, Zsuzsanna Vörös, & Csilla Füri)
- August 30: 2003 World Youth "A" Modern Pentathlon Championships in (Mexico) León
  - Youth Individual winners: (Russia) Pavel Sekretev (m) / (Egypt) Aya Medany (f)
  - Youth Men's Team Relay winners: Egypt (Mena Tadros, Ahmed Samir, & Omar El Geziry)
  - Youth Women's Team Relay winners: Hungary (Ildiko Hidvegi, Nikola Stefanovits, & Katalin Prill)
- September 9: 2003 World Junior Modern Pentathlon Championships in (Greece) Athens
  - Junior Individual winners: (Belarus) Mihail Prokopenko (m) / (United Kingdom) Heather Fell (f)
  - Junior Men's Team Relay winners: Hungary (Robert Liptak, Ádám Marosi, & Zoltan Halasi)
  - Junior Women's Team Relay winner: (Russia) Vera Feshchenko

== Continental modern pentathlon events ==
- Note: There seemed to be a discrepancy by the UIPM. Both Budapest and Ústí nad Labem claim to be the European MP host city.
- May 2: 2003 European Modern Pentathlon Championships in (Hungary) Budapest
  - Individual winners: (Czech Republic) Petr Lébl (m) / (Russia) Aleksandra Sadovnikova (f)
- May 24 & 25: 2003 NORCECA (Pan American) Modern Pentathlon Championships in (Dominican Republic) Santo Domingo
  - Individual winners: (United States) Eli Bremer (m) / (Guatemala) Maribel Sanz-Agero (f)
- June 12: 2003 South American Modern Pentathlon Championships in (Chile) Santiago
  - Winner: (Brazil) Eduardo Carvalho
- June 12: 2003 European Junior Modern Pentathlon Championships in (Czech Republic) Ústí nad Labem
  - Junior Individual winners: (Belarus) Mihail Prokopenko (m) / (Belarus) Anastasiya Prokopenko (f)
  - Junior Men's Team Relay winners: Belarus (Yahor Lapo, Vitali Bavin, & Mihail Prokopenko)
  - Junior Women's Team Relay winners: Russia (Evdokia Gretchichnikova, Vera Feshschenko, & Tatiana Gorliak)
- August 14: 2003 European Youth "B" Modern Pentathlon Championships in (Bulgaria) Varna
  - Youth Individual winners: (Russia) Igor Zenin (m) / (Finland) Laura Salminen (f)
- August 28: 2003 European Modern Pentathlon Championships in (Czech Republic) Ústí nad Labem
  - Individual winners: (Lithuania) Edvinas Krungolcas (m) / (United Kingdom) Georgina Harland (f)
  - Men's Team Relay winners: Hungary (Viktor Horváth, Ákos Kállai, & Sandor Fulep)
  - Women's Team Relay winners: Hungary (Bea Simoka, Csilla Füri, & Zsuzsanna Vörös)

== 2003 Modern Pentathlon World Cup ==
- March 6: MPWC #1 in Mexico City
  - Individual winners: (Lithuania) Edvinas Krungolcas (m) / (Italy) Claudia Corsini (f)
- April 24: MPWC #2 for Women in (Hungary) Székesfehérvár
  - Individual winner: (Hungary) Csilla Füri
  - Women's Team Relay winners: Great Britain (Sian Lewis, Sarah Langridge, & Georgina Harland)
- April 25: MPWC #2 for Men in (Germany) Berlin
  - Winner: (Italy) Andrea Valentini
- May 11: MPWC #3 for Men in (Hungary) Budapest
  - Winner: (Lithuania) Andrejus Zadneprovskis
- June 1: MPWC #3 for Women in (Poland) Warsaw
  - Winner: (Poland) Paulina Boenisz
- June 26: MPWC #4 in (Czech Republic) Most
  - Individual winners: (Czech Republic) Michal Sedlecký (m) / (Germany) Kim Raisner (f)
- December 13 & 14: MPWC #5 (final) in (Greece) Athens
  - Individual winners: (Kazakhstan) Rustem Sabirkhuzin (m) / (United Kingdom) Georgina Harland (f)
