= 1999 in modern pentathlon =

This article lists the main modern pentathlon events and their results for 1999.

== International modern pentathlon events ==
- Note: The results in the UIPM website for this event (Winnipeg) is completely wrong.
- August 3: 1999 Pan American Games in (Canada) Winnipeg
  - Individual winners: (United States) Velizar Iliev (m) / (United States) Mary Beth Iagorashvili (f)
- August 25: 1999 CISM Modern Pentathlon Championships in (Poland) Warsaw
  - Men's Individual winner: (Czech Republic) Libor Capalini
  - Men's Team Relay winners: Germany (Roman Wagner, Eric Walther, & Jan Veder)

== World modern pentathlon events ==
- Note: The results for the women's individual event (Budapest) was incomplete.
- Note: The results for the women's individual event (Chieti) was incomplete.
- Note: The results for the men's team relay event (Chieti) was inconclusive.
- Note: There was no results for the men's event (Bayreuth) here.
- July 13: 1999 World Modern Pentathlon Championships in Budapest
  - Men's Individual winner: (Hungary) Gábor Balogh
  - Men's Team Relay winners: Hungary (Peter Sarfalvi, Gábor Balogh, & Akos Hanzely)
  - Women's Team Relay winners: Great Britain (Steph Cook & Georgina Harland)
- August 4: 1999 World Junior Modern Pentathlon Championships in (Italy) Chieti
  - Men's Individual winner: (South Korea) CHOI Jae-kun
  - Women's Team Relay winners: Poland (Katarzyna Baran, Dominica Grodzicka, & Marlene Zolnowska)
- September 3: 1999 World Youth "A" Modern Pentathlon Championships in (Germany) Bayreuth
  - Women's Individual winner: (Russia) Tatiana Gorliak

== Continental modern pentathlon events ==
- Note: The results for the men's team relay event (Székesfehérvár) was inconclusive.
- Note: It was not clear which city hosted the EMPC here.
- Note: It was not clear who won the women's individual event (Santiago) here.
- Note: There was no results for the women's individual (Sant Boi de Llobregat) event.
- Note: The results for the men's team relay event (Bishkek) was inconclusive.
- April 12: 1999 European Junior Modern Pentathlon Championships in Székesfehérvár
  - Junior Individual winners: (Germany) Eric Walther (m) / (Hungary) Zsuzsanna Vörös (f)
  - Women's Junior Team Relay winners: Hungary (Noemi Feher, Nora Simoka, & Vivien Mathe)
- May 27: 1999 European Modern Pentathlon Championships (#1) in (Poland) Drzonków
  - Individual winners: (Hungary) Gábor Balogh (m) / (Greece) Katalin Partics (f)
- June 3: 1999 European Modern Pentathlon Championships (#2) in (Finland) Tampere
  - Men's Individual winner: (Romania) Nicolae Papuc
- June 27: 1999 South American Modern Pentathlon Championships in (Chile) Santiago
  - Men's Individual winner: (Germany) Jan Veder
  - Women's Individual winner: (France) Caroline Delemer or (United Kingdom) Steph Cook
- July 23: 1999 European Youth "B" Modern Pentathlon Championships in (Spain) Sant Boi de Llobregat
  - Youth Individual winner: (Lithuania) Andrejus Zadneprovskis
- October 4: 1999 Asian Modern Pentathlon Championships in (Kyrgyzstan) Bishkek
  - Men's Individual winner: (Lithuania) Andrejus Zadneprovskis

== 1999 Modern Pentathlon World Cup ==
- Note: The women's results for the Mexico City event (#2) was inconclusive.
- Note: The women's results for the Rome event (#3) was inconclusive.
- March 6: MPWC #1 in (United States) San Antonio
  - Men's Individual winners: (Finland) Janne Pykalisto & (Hungary) Akos Hanzely
  - Women's Individual winners: (Poland) Anna Sulima & (Hungary) Nora Simoka
  - Women's Team Relay winners: Hungary (Nora Simoka, Eva Sasvari, & Vivien Mathe)
- March 7: MPWC #2 in Mexico City
  - Men's Individual winners: (Germany) Marco Lutzenberger & (United States) Vakhtang Iagorashvili
  - Men's Team Relay winners: Russia (Mikhail Kuznetov, Ilia Frolov, & Alexei Velikodnyi)
- April 8: MPWC #3 in (Italy) Rome
  - Men's Individual winner: (Czech Republic) Michal Sedlecky
- April 22: MPWC #4 in (Germany) Darmstadt
  - Women's Individual winners: (Sweden) Jeanette Malm & (United Kingdom) Steph Cook
  - Women's Team Relay winners: Hungary (Csilla Füri, Nora Simoka, & Zsuzsanna Vörös)
- May 6 & 7: MPWC #5 in (Hungary) Budapest & (France) Aix-en-Provence
  - Men's Individual winner: (Bulgaria) Tzanko Hantov
  - Women's Individual winners: (United Kingdom) Steph Cook & (Italy) Federica Foghetti
- September 25 & 26: MPWC #6 (final) in (Australia) Sydney
  - Individual winners: (France) Sébastien Deleigne (m) / (Hungary) Zsuzsanna Vörös (f)
  - Men's Team Relay winners: Hungary (Peter Sarfalvi, Gábor Balogh, & Akos Hanzely)
  - Women's Team Relay winners: Great Britain (Georgina Harland, Steph Cook, & Kate Allenby)
