= Modern pentathlon at the 2004 Summer Olympics – Women's =

Women's modern pentathlon at the Games of the XXVIII Olympiad
- Venue: Olympic Modern Pentathlon Centre
- Date: 27 August
- Competitors: 32 from 21 nations
- Winning score: 5448

Medalists
1st place, gold medalist(s)		Zsuzsanna Vörös	Hungary
2nd place, silver medalist(s)		Jeļena Rubļevska	Latvia
3rd place, bronze medalist(s)		Georgina Harland	Great Britain

The women's modern pentathlon at the 2004 Summer Olympics took place at the Olympic Modern Pentathlon Centre in Goudi Olympic Complex on 27 August. On its second appearance at the Olympics, thirty-two athletes from 21 nations participated in this event.

Zsuzsanna Vörös of Hungary emerged as the top favorite in the women's event, and won the gold medal, with a score of 5,448 points. Meanwhile, Jeļena Rubļevska set a historic milestone as the first female Latvian to win an Olympic medal, taking the silver in this event. Great Britain's Georgina Harland claimed the nation's second Olympic bronze medal, and third overall for the women's.

== Competition format ==
The modern pentathlon consisted of five events, with all five held in one day.

- Shooting: A 4.5 mm air pistol shooting (the athlete must hit 20 shots, one at each target). Score was based on the number of shots hitting at each target.
- Fencing: A round-robin, one-touch épée competition. Score was based on winning percentage.
- Swimming: A 200 m freestyle race. Score was based on time.
- Horse-riding: A show jumping competition. Score based on penalties for fallen bars, refusals, falls, and being over the time limit.
- Running: A 3 km run. Starts are staggered (based on points from first four events), so that the first to cross the finish line wins.

== Schedule ==
All times are Greece Standard Time (UTC+2)

Date	Time	Round
Friday, 27 August 2004	10:00	Shooting
Friday, 27 August 2004	11:00	Fencing
Friday, 27 August 2004	14:25	Swimming
Friday, 27 August 2004	16:15	Riding
Friday, 27 August 2004	18:20	Running

== Results ==
Rank	Athlete	Country	Shooting Score (pts)	Fencing Victories (pts)	Swimming Time (pts)	Riding Penalties (pts)	Running Time (pts)	Total
1st place, gold medalist(s)	Zsuzsanna Vörös	Hungary	182 (1120)	19 (916)	2:15.59 (1296)	76 (1124)	11:22.00 (992)	5448
2nd place, silver medalist(s)	Jeļena Rubļevska	Latvia	171 (988)	23 (1028)	2:26.96 (1160)	84 (1116)	10:58.00 (1088)	5380
3rd place, bronze medalist(s)	Georgina Harland	Great Britain	156 (808)	16 (832)	2:14.60 (1308)	56 (1144)	10:17.31 (1252)	5344
4	Claudia Corsini	Italy	169 (964)	21 (972)	2:20.56 (1236)	84 (1116)	11:11.65 (1036)	5324
5	Kim Raisner	Germany	178 (1072)	16 (832)	2:18.16 (1264)	84 (1116)	11:13.21 (1028)	5312
6	Sylwia Czwojdzińska	Poland	179 (1084)	17 (860)	2:21.44 (1224)	84 (1116)	11:22.00 (992)	5276
7	Victoria Tereshchuk	Ukraine	178 (1072)	11 (692)	2:19.98 (1244)	84 (1116)	10:44.68 (1144)	5256
8	Kate Allenby	Great Britain	169 (964)	21 (972)	2:17.41 (1272)	196 (1004)	11:14.00 (1024)	5236
9	Tatsiana Mazurkevich	Belarus	184 (1144)	13 (748)	2:27.64 (1152)	80 (1120)	11:06.21 (1056)	5220
10	Paulina Boenisz	Poland	180 (1096)	13 (748)	2:28.13 (1144)	100 (1100)	10:56.05 (1096)	5184
11	Csilla Füri	Hungary	157 (820)	15 (804)	2:15.42 (1296)	28 (1172)	11:07.15 (1052)	5144
12	Amélie Caze	France	170 (976)	17 (860)	2:14.44 (1308)	124 (1076)	11:39.41 (924)	5144
13	Monica Pinette	Canada	178 (1072)	20 (944)	2:32.62 (1092)	168 (1032)	11:30.55 (960)	5100
14	Lada Jienbalanova	Kazakhstan	158 (832)	17 (860)	2:18.49 (1260)	56 (1144)	11:25.45 (980)	5076
15	Mary Beth Iagorashvili	United States	152 (760)	16 (832)	2:19.30 (1252)	56 (1144)	11:04.37 (1064)	5052
16	Katalin-Beat Partics	Greece	176 (1048)	17 (860)	2:23.32 (1204)	168 (1032)	11:49.11 (884)	5028
17	Olesya Velichko	Russia	176 (1048)	14 (776)	2:34.96 (1064)	140 (1060)	11:03.75 (1068)	5016
18	Anita Allen	United States	168 (952)	12 (720)	2:31.16 (1108)	28 (1172)	11:09.00 (1044)	4996
19	Blandine Lachèze	France	179 (1084)	13 (748)	2:26.31 (1168)	84 (1116)	11:52.47 (872)	4988
20	Eszter Hortobagyi	Australia	169 (964)	11 (692)	2:29.42 (1128)	56 (1144)	11:11.44 (1036)	4964
21	Halina Bashlakova	Belarus	156 (808)	14 (776)	2:26.02 (1168)	28 (1172)	11:15.25 (1020)	4944
22	Kara Grant	Canada	169 (964)	16 (832)	2:43.37 (960)	104 (1096)	11:01.57 (1076)	4928
23	Liudmila Sirotkina	Kyrgyzstan	168 (952)	14 (776)	2:26.92 (1160)	56 (1144)	11:46.95 (896)	4928
24	Dong Lean	China	189 (1204)	13 (748)	2:21.67 (1220)	300 (900)	11:58.05 (848)	4920
25	Samantha Harvey	Brazil	178 (1072)	17 (860)	2:27.35 (1152)	224 (976)	12:03.10 (828)	4888
26	Alexandra Kalinovská	Czech Republic	164 (904)	18 (888)	2:30.05 (1120)	252 (948)	11:14.40 (1024)	4884
27	Tatiana Mouratova	Russia	174 (1024)	15 (804)	2:20.22 (1240)	380 (820)	11:22.30 (992)	4880
28	Aya Medany	Egypt	181 (1108)	12 (720)	2:21.37 (1224)	224 (976)	12:04.06 (824)	4852
29	Liang Caixia	China	158 (832)	12 (720)	2:20.93 (1232)	240 (960)	11:43.01 (908)	4652
30	Lyudmila Shumilova	Kazakhstan	170 (976)	7 (568)	2:27.22 (1156)	168 (1032)	11:43.41 (908)	4640
31	María Isabel Sanz-Agero	Guatemala	161 (868)	10 (664)	2:30.29 (1120)	172 (1028)	12:23.90 (748)	4428
32	Federica Foghetti	Italy	167 (940)	15 (804)	2:25.81 (1172)	892 (308)*	11:19.11 (1004)	4228

* Did not finish the riding course because of the exceeding number of obstacle and time penalties
