= 2005 in modern pentathlon =

This article lists the main modern pentathlon events and their results for 2005.

== International modern pentathlon events ==
- May 26: 2005 CISM Modern Pentathlon Championships in (Czech Republic) Prague
  - Note: There was no women's individual event here.
  - Winner: (Czech Republic) Michal Sedlecky
- December 3: 2005 NORDECA Modern Pentathlon Championships in Guatemala City
  - Individual winners: (United States) Niul Manske (m) / (Cuba) Katia Rodriguez (f)

== World modern pentathlon events ==
- July 27 & 28: 2005 World Junior Modern Pentathlon Championships in (Russia) Moscow
  - Junior Individual winners: (Hungary) Ádám Marosi (m) / (Germany) Lena Schöneborn (f)
- August 3 – 5: 2005 World Modern Pentathlon Championships in (Poland) Warsaw
  - Individual winners: (China) Qian Zhenhua (m) / (Italy) Claudia Corsini (f)
  - Men's Team Relay winners: Hungary (Sandor Fulep, Ákos Kállai, & Viktor Horváth)
  - Women's Team Relay winners: Germany (Elena Reiche, Lena Schöneborn, & Kim Raisner)
- August 26: 2005 World Youth "A" Modern Pentathlon Championships in (Czech Republic) Plzeň
  - Youth Individual winners: (Egypt) Yasser Hefny (m) / (Hungary) Zsofia Bartalis (f)

== Continental modern pentathlon events ==
- June 19: 2005 European Junior Modern Pentathlon Championships in (Italy) Montepulciano
  - Junior Individual winners: (Ukraine) Pavlo Kirpulyanskyy (m) / (France) Amélie Cazé (f)
- June 22: 2005 European Modern Pentathlon Championships in (Italy) Montepulciano
  - Individual winners: (Lithuania) Edvinas Krungolcas (m) / (Russia) Aleksandra Sadovnikova (f)
  - Men's Team Relay winners: Hungary (Gábor Balogh, Sandor Fulep, & Ákos Kállai)
- June 28 & 29: 2005 European Youth "B" Modern Pentathlon Championships in (Italy) Montepulciano
  - Youth Individual winners: (Poland) Michal Stefanski (m) / (Poland) Joanna Gomolinska (f)
- July 8: 2005 European Youth "A" Modern Pentathlon Championships in (Hungary) Budapest
  - Youth Individual winners: (Poland) Szymon Staśkiewicz (m) / (Hungary) Zsofia Bartalis (f)
- September 22: 2005 Asian Modern Pentathlon Championships in (Kazakhstan) Almaty
  - Individual winners: (South Korea) KIM Ki-hyun (m) / (Kazakhstan) Galina Dolgushina (f)
- October 10: 2005 Pan American Junior Modern Penatathlon Championships in (Argentina) Buenos Aires
  - Note: There was no women's individual event here.
  - Winner: (Mexico) Marco Martínez
- October 10: 2005 Pan American Modern Pentathlon Championships in (Argentina) Buenos Aires
  - Individual winners: (United States) Eli Bremer (m) / (United States) Sheila Taormina (f)

== 2005 Modern Pentathlon World Cup ==
- March 12 & 13: MPWC #1 in (Mexico) Acapulco
  - Individual winners: (Hungary) Gábor Balogh (m) / (France) Amélie Cazé (f)
- April 24: MPWC #2 for Women in (Hungary) Székesfehérvár
  - Winner: (Belarus) Anastasiya Prokopenko
- April 29: MPWC #2 for Men in (Germany) Leipzig
  - Winner: (Russia) Andrey Moiseyev
- May 13: MPWC #3 for Men in (Hungary) Budapest
  - Winner: (Lithuania) Andrejus Zadneprovskis
- May 13: MPWC #3 for Women in (France) Paris
  - Winner: (Hungary) Zsuzsanna Vörös
- July 8: MPWC #4 in (Greece) Athens
  - Individual winners: (Germany) Eric Walther (m) / (Belarus) Tatsiana Mazurkevich (f)
- August 20 & 21: MPWC #5 (final) in (Sweden) Uppsala
  - Individual winners: (Lithuania) Edvinas Krungolcas (m) / (Italy) Claudia Corsini (f)
