= 2007 in modern pentathlon =

This article lists the main modern pentathlon events and their results for 2007.

== International modern pentathlon events ==
- May 13 – 20: 2007 CISM Modern Pentathlon Championships in (Brazil) Rio de Janeiro
  - Individual winners: (Latvia) Sandris Sika (m) / (Brazil) Yane Marques (f)
- July 23 & 24: 2007 Pan American Games in (Brazil) Rio de Janeiro
  - Individual winners: (United States) Eli Bremer (m) / (Brazil) Yane Marques (f)

== World modern pentathlon events ==
- August 14 – 22: 2007 World Modern Pentathlon Championships in Berlin
  - Individual winners: (Hungary) Viktor Horváth (m) / (France) Amélie Cazé (f)
  - Men's Team Relay winners: Germany (Eric Walther, Sebastian Dietz, & Steffen Gebhardt)
  - Women's Team Relay winners: Great Britain (Mhairi Spence, Lindsey Weedon, & Katy Livingston)
- August 27 – September 2: 2007 World Youth "A" and Combined Modern Pentathlon Championships in (South Africa) Pretoria
  - Youth Individual winners: (Egypt) Yasser Hefny (m) / (Hungary) Krisztina Cseh (f)
  - Youth Men's Team Relay winners: Belarus (Mikalai Hayanouski, Raman Pinchuk, & Artsiom Romankov)
  - Youth Women's Team Relay winners: Great Britain (Rachael Maume, Kate French, & Freyja Prentice)
  - Youth Combined winners: (Russia) Maxim Sherstyuk (m) / (France) Anais Eudes (f)
- September 25 – 30: 2007 World Junior Modern Pentathlon Championships in (Portugal) Caldas da Rainha
  - Junior Individual winners: (Czech Republic) Ondřej Polívka (m) / (Hungary) Adrienn Tóth (f)
  - Junior Men's Team Relay winners: Italy (Pier Paolo Petroni, Riccardo De Luca, & Federico Giancamilli)

== Continental modern pentathlon events ==
- February 22 – 25: 2007 African Modern Pentathlon Championships in (Egypt) Cairo
  - Individual winners: (Egypt) Amro El Geziry (m) / (Egypt) Aya Medany (f)
- March 8 – 11: 2007 NORCECA Modern Pentathlon Championships in (Cuba) Havana
  - Individual winners: (Mexico) Sergio Escalante (m) / (Brazil) Larissa Lellys (f)
- May 10 – 13: 2007 Asian & Oceania Modern Pentathlon Championships in (Japan) Tokyo
  - Individual winners: (South Korea) Lee Choon-huan (m) / (China) Dong Le'an (f)
- June 6 – 13: 2007 European Modern Pentathlon Championships in (Latvia) Riga
  - Individual winners: (Hungary) Viktor Horváth (m) / (Russia) Evdokia Gretchichnikova (f)
  - Team Relay winners: (Russia) Aleksei Turkin (m) / (United Kingdom) Heather Fell (f)
- July 3 – 8: 2007 European Junior Modern Pentathlon Championships in Budapest
  - Junior Individual winners: (Hungary) Róbert Kasza (m) / (Hungary) Adrienn Tóth (f)
  - Junior Men's Team Relay winners: Poland (Szymon Staśkiewicz, Bartosz Majewski, & Michal Kacer)
  - Junior Women's Team Relay winners: Hungary (Adrienn Tóth, Krisztina Cseh, & Leila Gyenesei)
- July 4 – 9: 2007 European Youth "B" Modern Pentathlon Championships in (Spain) Las Palmas
  - Youth Individual winners: (Russia) Zaramuk Shabatokov (m) / (Hungary) Sarolta Kovács (f)
- July 12 – 15: 2007 European Youth "A" & Combined Modern Pentathlon Championships in (Lithuania) Vilnius
  - Youth Individual winners: (Russia) Maxim Sherstyuk (m) / (Hungary) Adrienn Tóth (f)
  - Youth Men's Team Relay winner: (Hungary) Bence Demeter
  - Youth Women's Team Relay winners: Hungary (Sarolta Kovács, Adrienn Tóth, & Krisztina Cseh)
  - Youth Combined winners: (Belarus) Mikalai Hayanouski (m) / (Germany) Ronja Steinborn (f)
- November 22 – 26: 2007 South American Senior & Junior Modern Pentathlon Championships in (Brazil) Rio de Janeiro
  - Senior/Junior Individual winners: (Bulgaria) Tzanko Hantov (m) / (United States) Margaux Isaksen (f)

== 2007 Modern Pentathlon World Cup ==
- March 2 – 5: MPWC #1 in Mexico City
  - Individual winners: (Poland) Marcin Horbacz (m) / (Poland) Edita Maloszyc (f)
- March 22 – 25: MPWC #2 in (Egypt) Cairo
  - Individual winners: (Germany) Eric Walther (m) / (Russia) Tatiana Mouratova (f)
- April 12 – 15: MPWC #3 in (United Kingdom) Millfield
  - Individual winners: (Hungary) Gábor Balogh (m) / (United Kingdom) Georgina Harland (f)
- May 10 – 13: MPWC #4 for Men in (Hungary) Budapest
  - Individual winner: (Russia) Andrey Moiseyev
- May 10 – 13: MPWC #4 for Women in (Russia) Moscow
  - Individual winner: (Russia) Tatiana Mouratova
- May 24 – 27: MPWC #5 for Men in (Poland) Drzonków
  - Individual winner: (Czech Republic) Libor Capalini
- May 24 – 27: MPWC #5 for Women in (Hungary) Székesfehérvár
  - Individual winner: (Hungary) Zsuzsanna Vörös
  - Women's Team Relay winners: Kazakhstan (Lada Jiyenbalanova, Alena Abrossimova, & Arina Jienbalanova)
- June 24 – 30: MPWC #6 in (Italy) Rome
  - Individual winners: (Czech Republic) Libor Capalini (m) / (Belarus) Anastasiya Prokopenko (f)
- September 15 & 16: MPWC #7 (final) in (China) Beijing
  - Individual winners: (Lithuania) Edvinas Krungolcas (m) / (Egypt) Aya Medany (f)
