= 2000 in modern pentathlon =

This article lists the main modern pentathlon events and their results for 2000.

== 2000 Summer Olympics (UIPM) ==
- September 30 & October 1: Modern pentathlon at the 2000 Summer Olympics in (Australia) Sydney at The Dome and Exhibition Complex, the Sydney International Aquatic Centre, and the Sydney Baseball Stadium
  - Men: (gold) (Russia) Dmitri Svatkovskiy; (silver) (Hungary) Gábor Balogh; (bronze) (Belarus) Pavel Dovgal
  - Women: (gold) (United Kingdom) Steph Cook; (silver) (United States) Emily deRiel; (bronze) (United Kingdom) Kate Allenby

== Other international modern pentathlon events ==
- July 23: 2000 CISM Regional Competition in (Czech Republic) Prague
  - Winner: (Lithuania) Andrejus Zadneprovskis

== World modern pentathlon events ==
- Note: The men's results from the 2000 World Junior MP Championships page were inconclusive.
- June 12 & 13: 2000 World Modern Pentathlon Championships in (Italy) Pesaro
  - Individual winners: (Lithuania) Andrejus Zadneprovskis (m) / (Denmark) Pernille Svarre (f)
- August 21: 2000 World Junior Modern Pentathlon Championships in (Bulgaria) Sofia
  - Women's Junior Individual winner: (Russia) Tatiana Mouratova

== Continental modern pentathlon events ==
- Note 1: There was no men's results in the UIPM's 2000 Oceania MP championships page.
- Note 2: There was no men's results in the UIPM's 2000 Asian MP championships page.
- Note 3: There were discrepancies, in terms about which city hosted the main UIPM's 2000 European Modern Pentathlon Championships event.
- Note 4: There was no men's results in the UIPM's 2000 Pan American MP championships page.
- January 29: 2000 Oceania Modern Pentathlon Championships in (Australia) Sydney
  - Women's Individual winner: (Australia) Cecile Walter
- April 23: 2000 Asian Modern Pentathlon Championships in (Japan) Osaka
  - Women's Individual winner: (China) WANG Jinglin
- May 24: 2000 South American Modern Pentathlon Championships in (Chile) Santiago
  - Men's Individual winner: (Mexico) Andrés García
  - Men's Team Relay winners: Brazil (Daniel Santos, Wagner Romao, & Eduardo Carvalho)
- July 3: 2000 European Modern Pentathlon Championships (#1) in (Hungary) Székesfehérvár
  - Individual winners: (Estonia) Imre Tiidemann (m) / (Hungary) Zsuzsanna Vörös (f)
- July 14: 2000 European Modern Pentathlon Championships (#2) in (Czech Republic) Plzeň
  - Women's Individual winner: (Russia) Tatiana Gorliak
- November 3 & 4: 2000 Pan American Modern Pentathlon Championships in (Cuba) Havana
  - Women's Individual winner: (Mexico) Miranda Dominguez

== 2000 Modern Pentathlon World Cup ==
- Note 1: There were no women's results for the MPWC #1 event.
- Note 2: There were no women's results for the MPWC #2 event.
- March 17 & 18: MPWC #1 in (United States) San Antonio
  - Men's Individual winner: (United States) Vakhtang Iagorashvili
  - Team Relay winners: (Russia) Andrei Kourakine (m) / (Brazil) Clarisse Menezes (f; default)
- April 7 & 8: MPWC #2 in (South Korea) Seoul
  - Winner: (Ukraine) Vadym Tkachuk
- April 27: MPWC #3 in (Hungary) Budapest
  - Both events had results that were inconclusive.
- May 11: MPWC #4 in (Germany) Darmstadt
  - Both events had results that were inconclusive.
- October 14 & 15: MPWC #5 (final) in (France) Aix-en-Provence
  - Individual winners: (Ukraine) Vadym Tkachuk (m) / (France) Caroline Delemer (f)
