= Modern pentathlon at the 2004 Summer Olympics – Men's =

Modern pentathlon at the Olympics

Men's modern pentathlon at the Games of the XXVIII Olympiad
- Venue: Olympic Modern Pentathlon Centre
- Date: 26 August
- Competitors: 32 from 21 nations
- Winning score: 5480

Medalists
1st place, gold medalist(s)		Andrey Moiseev; Russia
2nd place, silver medalist(s)		Andrejus Zadneprovskis; Lithuania
3rd place, bronze medalist(s)		Libor Capalini; Czech Republic

The men's modern pentathlon at the 2004 Summer Olympics took place at the Olympic Modern Pentathlon Centre in Goudi Olympic Complex on 26 August. Thirty-two athletes from 20 nations participated in this event.

Although the event was considered wide open, as no other athlete dominated the sport since 2000, the Russians, Lithuanians and Czechs continued to reach the top positions in the men's competition. Russia's Andrey Moiseev won the gold medal with a score of 5,480 points. Andrejus Zadneprovskis of Lithuania won the nation's first ever Olympic medal in modern pentathlon, taking the silver. Libor Capalini of the Czech Republic, on the other hand, claimed the bronze, winning his nation's first medal in the sport since Jan Bártů won one for Czechoslovakia in 1976.

== Competition format ==
The modern pentathlon consisted of five events, with all five held in one day.

- Shooting: A 4.5 mm air pistol shooting (the athlete must hit 20 shots, one at each target). Score was based on the number of shots hitting at each target.
- Fencing: A round-robin, one-touch épée competition. Score was based on winning percentage.
- Swimming: A 200 m freestyle race. Score was based on time.
- Horse-riding: A show jumping competition. Score based on penalties for fallen bars, refusals, falls, and being over the time limit.
- Running: A 3 km run. Starts are staggered (based on points from first four events), so that the first to cross the finish line wins.

== Schedule ==
All times are Greece Standard Time (UTC+2)

Date	Time	Round
Thursday, 26 August 2004	10:00	Shooting
Thursday, 26 August 2004	11:00	Fencing
Thursday, 26 August 2004	14:25	Swimming
Thursday, 26 August 2004	16:15	Riding
Thursday, 26 August 2004	18:20	Running

== Results ==
Rank	Athlete	Country	Shooting Score (pts)	Fencing Victories (pts)	Swimming Time (pts)	Riding Penalties (pts)	Running Time (pts)	Total
1st place, gold medalist(s)	Andrey Moiseev	Russia	175 (1036)	22 (1000)	1:58.88 (1376)	168 (1032)	9:51.88 (1036)	5480
2nd place, silver medalist(s)	Andrejus Zadneprovskis	Lithuania	172 (1000)	19 (916)	2:04.34 (1308)	112 (1088)	9:31.46 (1116)	5428
3rd place, bronze medalist(s)	Libor Capalini	Czech Republic	179 (1084)	14 (776)	2:02.00 (1336)	84 (1116)	9:40.70 (1080)	5392
4	Deniss Čerkovskis	Latvia	180 (1096)	19 (916)	2:09.00 (1252)	196 (1004)	9:38.77 (1088)	5356
5	Dzmitry Meliakh	Belarus	186 (1168)	11 (692)	2:02.63 (1332)	56 (1144)	9:59.45 (1004)	5340
6	Michal Michalík	Czech Republic	181 (1108)	18 (888)	2:08.51 (1260)	56 (1144)	10:17.68 (932)	5332
7	Eric Walther	Germany	168 (952)	16 (832)	2:02.03 (1336)	84 (1116)	9:39.36 (1084)	5320
8	Gábor Balogh	Hungary	175 (1036)	15 (804)	2:10.02 (1240)	28 (1172)	9:49.67 (1044)	5296
9	Vakhtang Iagorashvili	United States	171 (988)	19 (916)	2:09.11 (1252)	28 (1172)	10:13.95 (948)	5276
10	Rustem Sabizkhuzin	Russia	185 (1156)	18 (888)	2:12.02 (1216)	292 (908)	9:39.60 (1084)	5252
11	Sergio Salazar	Mexico	172 (1000)	16 (832)	2:07.27 (1276)	112 (1088)	9:59.15 (1004)	5200
12	Manuel Pradillo	Mexico	178 (1072)	15 (804)	2:07.07 (1276)	168 (1032)	9:57.68 (1012)	5196
13	Chad Senior	United States	175 (1036)	12 (720)	2:02.39 (1332)	196 (1004)	9:35.76 (1100)	5192
14	Niklaus Brünisholz	Switzerland	180 (1096)	14 (776)	2:09.12 (1252)	196 (1004)	9:46.75 (1056)	5184
15	Sébastien Deleigne	France	180 (1096)	15 (804)	2:12.27 (1216)	196 (1004)	9:45.31 (1060)	5180
16	Qian Zhenhua	China	185 (1156)	12 (720)	2:08.52 (1260)	56 (1144)	10:27.25 (892)	5172
17	Steffen Gebhardt	Germany	183 (1132)	13 (748)	2:12.84 (1208)	112 (1088)	10:08.81 (968)	5144
18	Ákos Kállai	Hungary	179 (1084)	18 (888)	2:14.64 (1188)	196 (1004)	10:08.75 (968)	5132
19	Andrea Valentini	Italy	169 (964)	19 (916)	2:18.34 (1140)	124 (1068)	10:01.25 (996)	5084
20	Raouf Abdou	Egypt	174 (1024)	13 (748)	2:12.32 (1216)	140 (1060)	9:51.48 (1036)	5084
21	Lee Choon-huan	South Korea	175 (1036)	12 (720)	2:12.02 (1216)	84 (1116)	10:05.85 (980)	5068
22	Pavel Uvarov	Kyrgyzstan	181 (1108)	10 (664)	2:13.26 (1204)	140 (1060)	10:05.95 (980)	5016
23	Erik Johansson	Sweden	163 (892)	12 (720)	2:06.68 (1280)	84 (1116)	10:08.20 (968)	4976
24	Han Do-ryeong	South Korea	183 (1132)	15 (804)	2:09.78 (1244)	392 (808)	10:13.85 (948)	4936
25	Raphaël Astier	France	163 (892)	14 (776)	2:06.93 (1280)	204 (996)	10:03.64 (988)	4932
26	Enrico Dell'Amore	Italy	180 (1096)	18 (888)	2:16.63 (1164)	440 (760)	9:55.01 (1020)	4928
27	Alexander Parygin	Australia	169 (964)	13 (748)	2:14.14 (1192)	196 (1004)	10:01.57 (996)	4904
28	Vasileios Floros	Greece	174 (1024)	10 (664)	2:04.40 (1308)	100 (1100)	11:02.25 (752)	4848
29	Daniel dos Santos	Brazil	163 (892)	14 (776)	2:16.52 (1164)	84 (1116)	10:54.15 (784)	4732
30	Andrzej Stefanek	Poland	172 (1000)	16 (832)	2:07.37 (1272)	616 (584)	10:03.35 (988)	4676
31	Edvinas Krungolcas	Lithuania	171 (988)	16 (832)	2:07.23 (1276)	112 (1088)	13:11.15 (236)	4420
32	Marcin Horbacz	Poland	181 (1108)	18 (888)	2:04.43 (1308)	1088 (112)*	10:07.46 (972)	4388

* Did not finish the riding course because of the exceeding number of obstacle and time penalties
