= Modern pentathlon at the 2000 Summer Olympics – Women's =

Modern pentathlon at the Olympics

Women's modern pentathlon at the Games of the XXVII Olympiad
- Venue: The Dome and Exhibition Complex (fencing and shooting); Sydney International Aquatic Centre (swimming); Sydney Baseball Stadium (riding and running)
- Date: 1 October
- Competitors: 24 from 18 nations
- Winning score: 5318

Medalists
1st place, gold medalist(s)		Stephanie Cook	Great Britain
2nd place, silver medalist(s)		Emily de Riel	United States
3rd place, bronze medalist(s)		Kate Allenby	Great Britain

The inaugural women's modern pentathlon at the 2000 Summer Olympics in Sydney was held on October 1. Three venues were used: The Dome and Exhibition Complex (fencing and shooting), Sydney International Aquatic Centre (swimming) and Sydney Baseball Stadium (horse-riding and cross-country running). Stephanie Cook from Great Britain won the gold medal in the first-ever women's event, with a score of 5,318 points.

== Competition format ==
The modern pentathlon consisted of five events, with all five held in one day.

- Shooting: A 4.5 mm air pistol shooting (the athlete must hit 20 shots, one at each target). The score was based on the number of shots hitting at each target.
- Fencing: A round-robin, one-touch épée competition. The score was based on winning percentage.
- Swimming: A 200 m freestyle race. Score was based on time.
- Horse-riding: A show jumping competition. The score based on penalties for fallen bars, refusals, falls, and being over the time limit.
- Running: A 3 km run. The starts are staggered (based on points from first four events), so that the first to cross the finish line wins.

== Schedule ==
All times are Australian Time (UTC+10)

Date	Time	Round
Sunday, 1 October 2000	06:45	Shooting
Sunday, 1 October 2000	08:00	Fencing
Sunday, 1 October 2000	11:25	Swimming
Sunday, 1 October 2000	13:45	Riding
Sunday, 1 October 2000	16:20	Running

== Results ==
Twenty-four athletes participated.

Rank	Athlete	Country	Shooting Score (pts)	Fencing Victories (pts)	Swimming Time (pts)	Riding Penalties (pts)	Running Time (pts)	Total
1st place, gold medalist(s)	Stephanie Cook	Great Britain	178 (1072)	10 (760)	2:26.28 (1138)	60 (1040)	10:03.16 (1308)	5318
2nd place, silver medalist(s)	Emily de Riel	United States	185 (1156)	11 (800)	2:21.88 (1182)	30 (1070)	10:54.56 (1102)	5310
3rd place, bronze medalist(s)	Kate Allenby	Great Britain	175 (1036)	14 (920)	2:20.93 (1191)	60 (1040)	10:58.71 (1086)	5273
4	Mary Beth Iagorashvili	United States	169 (964)	15 (960)	2:19.51 (1205)	60 (1040)	11:30.29 (960)	5129
5	Paulina Boenisz	Poland	177 (1060)	11 (800)	2:27.96 (1121)	60 (1040)	11:00.66 (1078)	5099
6	Zhanna Shubyonok	Belarus	179 (1084)	12 (840)	2:25.89 (1142)	90 (1010)	11:17.89 (1010)	5086
7	Yelizaveta Suvorova	Russia	180 (1096)	15 (960)	2:28.39 (1117)	273 (827)	11:01.37 (1076)	5076
8	Jeļena Rubļevska	Latvia	169 (964)	15 (960)	2:29.07 (1110)	145 (955)	11:04.81 (1062)	5051
9	Claudia Cerutti	Italy	178 (1072)	11 (800)	2:17.18 (1229)	97 (1003)	11:39.90 (922)	5026
10	Caroline Delemer	France	161 (868)	15 (950)	2:26.40 (1136)	120 (980)	11:05.62 (1058)	4992
11	Tetiana Nakazna	Ukraine	175 (1036)	11 (800)	2:24.12 (1159)	184 (916)	11:03.87 (1066)	4977
12	Florence Dinichert	Switzerland	184 (1144)	11 (800)	2:38.18 (1019)	150 (950)	11:10.38 (1040)	4953
13	Tatiana Mouratova	Russia	177 (1060)	11 (800)	2:27.86 (1122)	60 (1040)	11:41.86 (914)	4936
14	Kitty Chiller	Australia	172 (1000)	10 (760)	2:25.84 (1142)	60 (1040)	11:34.02 (944)	4886
15	Zsuzsanna Vörös	Hungary	173 (1012)	11 (800)	2:15.82 (1242)	270 (830)	11:24.69 (982)	4866
16	Dorota Idzi	Poland	167 (940)	12 (840)	2:22.78 (1173)	192 (908)	11:55.09 (860)	4721
17	Jeanette Malm	Sweden	170 (976)	8 (680)	2:19.70 (1203)	216 (884)	11:34.26 (944)	4687
18	Karina Gerber	South Africa	166 (928)	9 (720)	2:29.13 (1109)	60 (1040)	12:05.38 (820)	4617
19	Pernille Svarre	Denmark	161 (868)	7 (640)	2:29.94 (1101)	398 (702)	10:22.56 (1230)	4541
20	Wang Jinlin	China	174 (1024)	10 (760)	2:29.51 (1105)	321 (779)	12:04.76 (822)	4490
21	Elena Reiche	Germany	174 (1024)	11 (800)	2:27.51 (1125)	493 (607)	12:23.49 (748)	4302
22	Katalin-Beat Partics	Greece	184 (1144)	9 (720)	2:21.21 (1188)	DNF (0)	12:48.26 (648)	3700
23	Nóra Simóka	Hungary	182 (1120)	11 (800)	2:27.87 (1122)	DNF (0)	DNS (0)	3042
24	Fabiana Fares	Italy	161 (868)	13 (880)	2:28.56 (1115)	DNF (0)	DNS (0)	2863
