= 2001 in modern pentathlon =

This article lists the main modern pentathlon events and their results for 2001.

== International modern pentathlon events ==
- September 28: 2001 CISM Modern Pentathlon Championships in (Germany) Warendorf
  - Winner: (Mexico) Sergio Salazar

== World modern pentathlon events ==
- July 16: 2001 World Modern Pentathlon Championships in (United Kingdom) Millfield
  - Individual winners: (Hungary) Gábor Balogh (m) / (United Kingdom) Steph Cook (f)
- August 2: 2001 World Junior Modern Pentathlon Championships in Budapest
  - Junior Individual winners: (Czech Republic) Michal Michalík (m) / (Russia) Tatiana Gorliak (f)
  - Junior Men's Team Relay winners: Egypt (Ali Assem, Raouf El-Raouf, & Mohamed Abdel Raouf)
  - Junior Women's Team Relay winners: Hungary (Nora Simoka, Vivien Mathe, & Eva Sasvari)
- August 28: 2001 World Youth "A" Modern Pentathlon Championships in (Sweden) Uppsala
  - Youth Individual winners: (Hungary) Robert Liptak (m) / (Belarus) Anastasiya Prokopenko (f)

== Continental modern pentathlon events ==
- Note 1: There is a discrepancy between three European cities as the main European MP Championships one.
- Note 2: The men's EMPC (Sofia) results are not complete. Therefore, it is not definitive here.
- June 18: 2001 European Modern Pentathlon Championships in (Bulgaria) Sofia
  - Winner: (United Kingdom) Steph Cook
- July 2: 2001 European Modern Pentathlon Championships (Women) in (Czech Republic) Ústí nad Labem
  - Winner: (Hungary) Nora Simoka
- July 12: 2001 European Youth "A" Modern Pentathlon Championships in (Poland) Spała
  - Youth Individual winners: (Russia) Dmitriy Telegin (m) / (Russia) Tatiana Gorliak (f)
- August 15: 2001 European Modern Pentathlon Championships (Men) in (Spain) Melilla
  - Winner: (Czech Republic) Petr Lébl

== 2001 Modern Pentathlon World Cup ==
- Note 1: The MPWC #3 for Men (May 11) does not have any results on its UIPM page.
- Note 2: The MPWC #4 for Women (August 11) does not have any results on its UIPM page.
- March 17: MPWC #1 in Mexico City
  - Individual winners: (Lithuania) Edvinas Krungolcas (m) / (United Kingdom) Georgina Harland
- April 28: MPWC #2 for Men in (Germany) Warendorf
  - Winner: (Hungary) Sandor Fulep
- April 29: MPWC #2 for Women in (Hungary) Székesfehérvár
  - Winner: (United Kingdom) Georgina Harland
- May 11: MPWC #3 for Women in (United Kingdom) Bath
  - Winner: (United Kingdom) Steph Cook
- August 12: MPWC #4 (Men; final) in (Russia) Moscow
  - Winner: (Lithuania) Edvinas Krungolcas
