= Biathle =

Sport combining running and swimming

Biathle is a sub-sport of modern pentathlon consisting of running and freestyle swimming. The legs are raced with continuous transitions like a triathlon. It is a sport in its own right and bears close resemblance to aquathlon which also contains swimming and running but comes from triathlon. The race length is usually 200 m swim and 3 km run, which is shorter than aquathlon usually is.

== Sport ==
Biathle is a world class sport but not an Olympic one. Competitions are held under rules of the Union Internationale de Pentathlon Moderne (UIPM).

== Biathle World Championships ==
The Biathle World Championships have been held in September or October annually since 1999. The first event was held in Monaco, and returned there every two years between 2003 and 2009. Approximately 500 athletes have competed at each edition of the championships, representing some 50 countries.

== Medallists ==
=== Men's Championship ===
Year	Gold	Silver	Bronze
1999	Chad Senior (USA)	Mark Muller (RSA)	Christophe Ruer (FRA)
2000	Davyd Hyam (RSA)	Damien Catherine (RSA)	Danilo Palmucci (ITA)
2001	Hendrik de Villiers (RSA)	Andrés García (MEX)	Julios Granados (MEX)
2002	Hendrik de Villiers (RSA)	Leonardio Fiorella (ITA)	Luca Villa (ITA)
2003	Hendrik de Villiers (RSA)	Leonardio Fiorella (ITA)	Manuel Canuto (ITA)
2004	Manuel Canuto (ITA)	Mark Tucker (AUS)	Jon Fletcher (GBR)
2005	Richard Stannard (GBR)	Leonardio Fiorella (ITA)	Manuel Canuto (ITA)
2006	Gregan Clarkson (GBR)	Christopher Lionett (RSA)	Jon Fletcher (GBR)
2007	Richard Stannard (GBR)	Danielo Brustolon (ITA)	Alberto Alessandroni (ITA)
2008	Gregan Clarkson (GBR)	Juan Pretorius (RSA)	Jon Fletcher (GBR)
2009	Alberto Alessandroni (ITA)	Danilo Brustolon (ITA)	Ryan Peter (RSA)
2010	Richard Stannard (GBR)	Lukas Purkar (CZE)	Nicholas Tipper (GBR)
2011	Jon Fletcher (GBR)	Marcos Mendiola (ESP)	Russell North (GBR)
2012	Richard Stannard (GBR)	Juan Domínguez (ARG)	Tomáš Svoboda (CZE)
2013	Tomáš Svoboda (CZE)	Gregan Clarkson (GBR)	Jon Fletcher (GBR)
2014	Berndt Burger (RSA)	Ricardo Rego (POR)	Tiago Sousa (POR)
2015	Alexandre Henrard (FRA)	Tomáš Svoboda (CZE)	Ricardo Rego (POR)
2016	Alexandre Henrard (FRA)	Tomáš Svoboda (CZE)	Ricardo Rego (POR)
2017	Tomáš Svoboda (CZE)	Alexandre Henrard (FRA)	Ricardo Rego (POR)
2018	Angelos Vasileiou (GRE)	Tomáš Svoboda (CZE)	Temirlan Temirov (KAZ)
2019	Tiago Sousa (POR)	Arman Kydyrtayev (KAZ)	Gregan Clarkson (GBR)
2021	Ayan Beisenbayev (KAZ)	Meirlan Iskakov (KAZ)	Panagiotis Bitados (GRE)
2022	Ayan Beisenbayev (KAZ)	Alexandre Dallenbach (SUI)	Temirlan Temirov (KAZ)
2023	Meirlan Iskakov (KAZ)	Temirlan Temirov (KAZ)	Maxim Shmulich (KAZ)
2024	Ayan Beisenbayev (KAZ)	Temirlan Temirov (KAZ)	Meirlan Iskakov (KAZ)
2025	Alexandre Dällenbach (SUI)	Florian Bärenthaler (AUT)	Dylan Kruger (RSA)
2026	Maxim Shmulich (KAZ)	Temirlan Temirov (KAZ)	Florian Bärenthaler (AUT)

=== Men's team championship ===
Year	Gold	Silver	Bronze
2015	Portugal (POR)	Georgia (GEO)	Not awarded
2016	Portugal (POR)	United States (USA)	Not awarded
2017	Czech Republic (CZE)	Portugal (POR)	France (FRA)
2018	Portugal (POR)	Egypt-1 (EGY)	Egypt-2 (EGY)
2019	United Kingdom (GBR)	Germany (GER)	United States (USA)
2021	Kazakhstan (KAZ)	Germany (GER)	Not awarded
2022	Kazakhstan (KAZ)	France (FRA)	Lithuania (LTU)
2023	Kazakhstan (KAZ)	Lithuania (LTU)	Indonesia (IDN)
2024	Kazakhstan (KAZ)	France (FRA)	Spain (ESP)
2025	South Africa (RSA)	India (IND)	Greece (GRE)
2026	Kazakhstan (KAZ)	Bulgaria (BUL)	France (FRA)

=== Women's championship ===
Year	Gold	Silver	Bronze
1999	Csilla Füri (HUN)	Pernille Svarre (DEN)	Rachel Jones (GBR)
2000	Rachel Jones (GBR)	Leandre Strydom (RSA)	Michelle Bridger (RSA)
2001	Rachel Jones (GBR)	Childs Treloar (RSA)	Caroline Bain (GBR)
2002	Daniela Chmet (ITA)	Rachel Jones (GBR)	Cristina Giribon (ITA)
2003	Daniela Chmet (ITA)	Rachel Jones (GBR)	Cristina Giribon (ITA)
2004	Daniela Chmet (ITA)	Laura Asadauskaitė (LTU)	Gwen Kinsey (GBR)
2005	Daniela Chmet (ITA)	Gwen Kinsey (GBR)	Cristina Giribon (ITA)
2006	Maria Barrett (GBR)	Caroline Jones (GBR)	Rachel Jones (GBR)
2007	Emma Davis (IRL)	Rachel Jones (GBR)	Maria Barrett (GBR)
2008	Andrea Steyn (RSA)	Rachel Jones (GBR)	Laura Hook (GBR)
2009	Daniela Chmet (ITA)	Rachel Jones (GBR)	Lucy Ferguson (GBR)
2010	Rachel Jones (GBR)	Natalie Thomas (GBR)	Kay Shafford (GBR)
2011	Nicola Roder (GBR)	Emma Davis (IRL)	Natalie Thomas (GBR)
2012	Petra Kuříková (CZE)	Rachel Jones (GBR)	Emma Davis (IRL)
2013	Nerissa Van der Walt (RSA)	Carmen Macheriotou (CYP)	Alice Sotero (ITA)
2014	Carina Richards (RSA)	Rachel Jones (GBR)	Kathy Wellam (GBR)
2015	Aurelija Tamašauskaitė (LTU)	Cindy Schwulst (RSA)	Carina Richards (RSA)
2016	Erin Storie (USA)	Lushano Smit (RSA)	Samantha Achterberg (USA)
2017	Eliška Přibylová (CZE)	Nicola Roder (GBR)	Camilia Akroune (FRA)
2018	Lena Gottwald (GER)	Lushano Smit (RSA)	Eliška Přibylová (CZE)
2019	Samantha Achterberg (USA)	Nadezhda Bekmaganbetova (KAZ)	Heidi Hendrick (USA)
2021	Anne-Kathrin Bucher (GER)	Alessia Mancini (ITA)	Pinelopi Nika (GRE)
2022	Lea Fernandez (FRA)	Aurelija Tamašauskaitė (LTU)	Mariana Arceo (MEX)
2023	Gintare Venckauskaite (LTU)	Ieva Serapinaitė (LTU)	Neda Doroševaitė (LTU)
2024	Bianca Strydom (RSA)	Annika Strydom (RSA)	Tara Schwulst (RSA)
2025	Léa Fernandez (FRA)	Jayme-Sue Vermaas (RSA)	Tara Schwulst (RSA)
2026	Emma Madden (USA)	Anel Issabayeva (KAZ)	Filipa Jesus (POR)

=== Women's team championship ===
Year	Gold	Silver	Bronze
2015	Georgia (GEO)	Not awarded	Not awarded
2016	United Kingdom (GBR)	United States (USA)	South Africa (RSA)
2017	France (FRA)	Not awarded	Not awarded
2018	Not awarded	Not awarded	Not awarded
2019	United States (USA)	Not awarded	Not awarded
2021	Germany (GER)	Not awarded	Not awarded
2022	South Africa (RSA)	Lithuania (LTU)	Portugal (POR)
2023	Lithuania (LTU)	Not awarded	Not awarded
2024	South Africa (RSA)	Not awarded	Not awarded
2025	South Africa (RSA)	Not awarded	Not awarded
2026	France (FRA)	Germany (GER)	Portugal (POR)

=== Mixed relay Championship ===
Year	Gold	Silver	Bronze
2016	Erin Storie / Logan Storie (USA)	Eliska Pribylova / Tomáš Svoboda (CZE)	Nina Waldner / Manfred Waldner (AUT)
2017	Julie Belhamri / Alexandre Henrard (FRA)	Eliska Pribylova / Tomáš Svoboda (CZE)	Catalina Balbín / Carlos García (ESP)
2018	Eliska Pribylova / Ondrej Svechota (CZE)	Lushano Adendorff Smith / Tian Russouw (RSA)	Zinayida Batrak / Dmytro Kirpulanskyy (UKR)
2019	Samantah Schultz / Amro Elgeziry (USA)	Nadezhda Bekmaganbetova / Arman Kydyrtayev (KAZ)	Sarah Fountain / Gregan Clarkson (GBR)
2021	Annika Schneider / Uli Raeth (GER)	María Carnero / Manuel Soriano (ESP)	Ida Arya / Christian Götz (GER)
2022	Aurelija Tamašauskaitė / Titas Puronas (LTU)	Eloise Combeau / Remy Naceri (FRA)	Lara Tonak / Robin Schmidt (GER)
2023	Gintare Venckauskaite / Titas Puronas (LTU)	Shyra Mae Aranzado / Samuel German (PHL)	Julia Dale / Geoffrey Delusier (MCO)
2024	Tauset López / Marco López (MEX)	Anel Issabayeva / Meirlan Iskakov (KAZ)	Tara Schwulst / Emihl Rossouw (RSA)
2025	Tara Schwulst / Dylan Kruger (RSA)	Léa Fernandez / William Atger (FRA)	Julia Dale / Geoffrey Delusier (MON)
2026	Tauset López / Marco López (MEX)	Natalie Hatfield / Sam Cobb (GBR)	Kateřina Váňová / Vojtěch Dana (CZE)

== Venue ==
Year	Location
1999	Monte Carlo, Monaco
2000	Port Elizabeth, South Africa
2001	Bonn, Germany
2002	Cagliari, Italy
2003	Monte Carlo, Monaco
2004	Marktoberdorf, Germany
2005	Monte Carlo, Monaco
2006	(United Kingdom) Salford Quays, Great Britain
2007	Monte Carlo, Monaco
2008	Cape Town, South Africa
2009	Monte Carlo, Monaco
2010	Dubai, United Arab Emirates
2011	Sofia, Bulgaria
2012	Dubai, United Arab Emirates
2013	Limassol, Cyprus
2014	Escuintla, Guatemala
2015	(Georgia (country)) Batumi, Georgia
2016	Sarasota, Florida, United States
2017	Viveiro, Spain
2018	Hurghada, Egypt
2019	St. Petersburg, Florida, United States
2021	Weiden, Germany
2022	Machico, Madeira, Portugal
2023	Bali, Indonesia
2024	Port Said, Egypt
2025	Mossel Bay, South Africa
2026	Funchal, Madeira, Portugal
2027	Bali, Indonesia
2028	Cape Town, South Africa

== See also ==
- Triathle
