= Emma Davies =

Emma Davies may refer to:

- Emma Davies (actress) (born 1970), English actress
- Emma Davies (cyclist) (born 1978), British Olympic cyclist

== See also ==
- Emma Davis (born 1986), Irish Olympic triathlete
