= Biathlon (disambiguation) =

Biathlon refers to the winter sport that combines cross-country skiing and rifle shooting.

Biathlon is also used to describe any sporting event made up of two disciplines, and may refer to:

- Biathle, a sub-sport of modern pentathlon combining swimming with running in a continuous format over distances common to modern pentathlon
- Modern biathlon, a sub-sport of modern pentathlon combining running with swimming in a non-continuous format over distances common to modern pentathlon

== See also ==
- Aquathlon, a sub-sport of triathlon combining swimming with running in a continuous format over distances common to triathlon
- Duathlon, a sub-sport of triathlon combining cycling with running in a continuous format over distances common to triathlon
