= Stefano Pecci =

Italian modern pentathlete (born 1979)

Personal information
- Born: 10 May 1979 (age 47) Rome, Italy

Sport
- Country: Italy
- Sport: Modern pentathlon
Medal record
Men's modern pentathlon
Representing Italy
World Championships
Bronze medal – third place	2004 Moscow	Team

Stefano Pecci (born 10 May 1979) is an Italian modern pentathlete. He represented Italy at the 2000 Summer Olympics held in Sydney, Australia in the men's modern pentathlon and he finished in 13th place.

In 2004, at the 2004 World Modern Pentathlon Championships held in Moscow, Russia, he won the bronze medal in the men's team event, alongside Andrea Valentini and Enrico dell'Amore.

In 2016, he was a candidate for the board of the European Confederation of Modern Pentathlon (ECMP) but he did not receive enough votes to be elected.
