= Sian Lewis =

Welsh pentathlete

Personal information
- Born: Sian Lewis

Sport
- Country: United Kingdom
Medal record
Event	1st	2nd	3rd
World Modern Pentathlon Championships	3	2	0
Total	3	2	0

Sian Lewis (born 8 October 1976) is a British former pentathlete who competed in the World Modern Pentathlon Championships between 1996 and 2003, winning three gold and two silver medals.

== Career ==
Lewis graduated from and trained at the University of Bath, coming from a swimming/ pony club background before moving onto modern pentathlon. Lewis' first Senior World Championships medal was at the World Modern Pentathlon Championships in 1998, where she won a silver in the team event with Steph Cook and Kate Allenby. In 1999, Lewis, Cook and Allenby again came second in the team event at the World Championships, and in 2000, Lewis, Cook and sister Gwen Kinsey won the team relay event at the World Championships. In 2001, Lewis, Cook and Allenby won the team event at the World Championships; Lewis finished fourteenth in the event. Lewis also won the 2001 Pentathlon World Cup event. In addition, she also represented Wales in the 2002 Commonwealth Games, coming 12th in the Women's 10m air pistol. After suffering with anorexia nervosa during the 2002 season, Lewis returned to pentathlon in 2003, winning the team event with Allenby and Georgina Harland at the World Championships.
