= Richard Stannard =

Richard Stannard may refer to:

- Richard Stannard (triathlete) (born 1974), British triathlete
- Richard Been Stannard (1902–1977), Royal Navy Victoria Cross winner of the Second World War
- Richard Stannard (songwriter), English songwriter and record producer
