= Daniela Chmet =

Italian triathlete

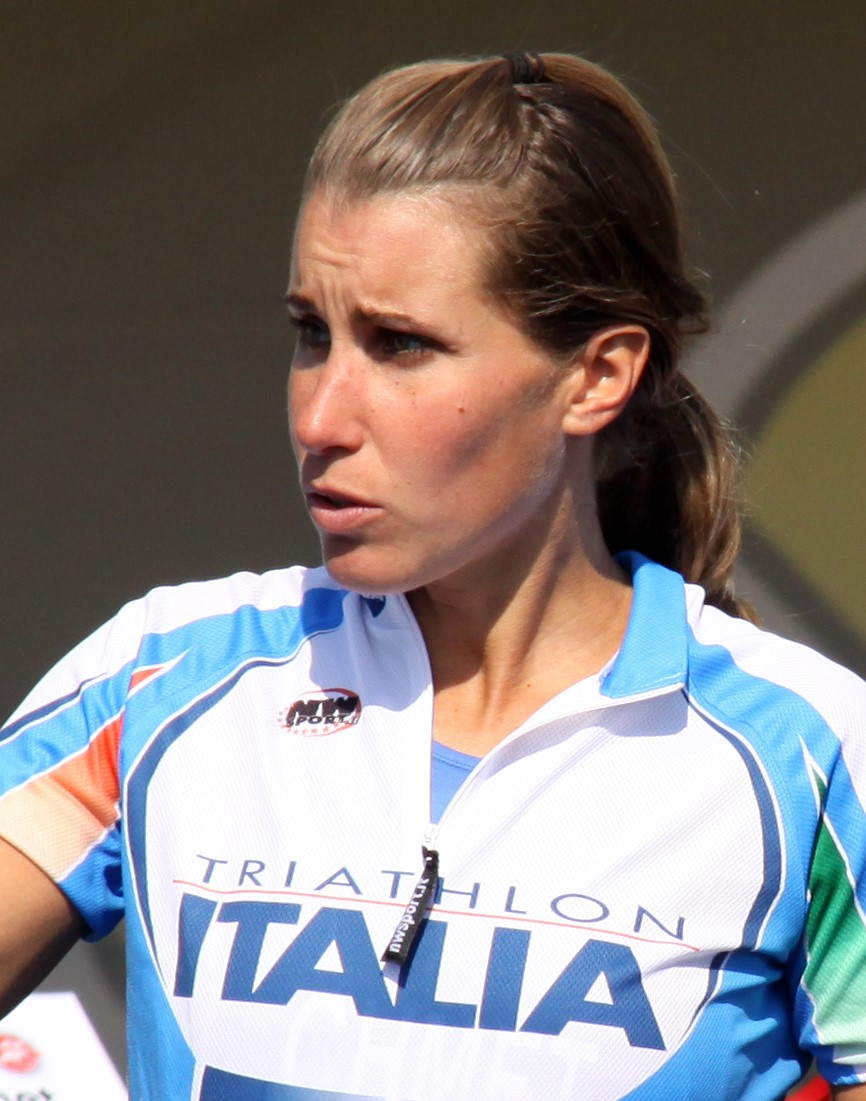
- Daniela Chmet checking in at the Premium European Cup triathlon in Alanya, 2010.

Personal information
- Nationality: Italian
- Born: 4 August 1979 (age 47) Trieste, Italy

Sport
- Sport: Triathlon
- Club: Fiamme Oro

Daniela Chmet (born 4 August 1979), is an Italian professional triathlete, 2007 National Sprint Champion and Biathle World Champion of the years 2002, 2003, 2004, 2005, and 2009.

== Biography ==
In the seven years from 2004 to 2010, Daniela Chmet took part in 32 ITU competitions and achieved six top ten positions. In 2006, she won the Team World Championships in Cancun together with Nadia Cortassa and Beatrice Lanza. In 2008, Chmet replaced Nadia Cortassa, who had to withdraw because of a hip fracture, in the Beijing Olympics, but she could not finish the race.

Chmet represents the police sports club G.S. Fiamme Oro which, however, has neither a high performance center in Trieste nor a triathlon section.

== ITU Competitions ==
In the seven years from 2004 to 2010 Chmet took part in 33 ITU competitions and achieved 6 top ten positions. The following list is based upon the official ITU rankings and the Athlete's Profile Page. Unless indicated otherwise the following competitions are triathlons (Olympic Distance) and belong to the Elite category.

Date	Competition	Place	Rank
2004-04-18	European Championships	Valencia	33
2004-05-05	Aquathlon World Championships	Madeira	6
2005-10-15	European Cup	Palermo	12
2006-05-21	Premium European Cup	Sanremo	10
2006-06-11	BG World Cup	Richards Bay	14
2006-07-09	BG World Cup	Edmonton	15
2006-08-13	BG World Cup	Tiszaújváros	25
2006-09-02	World Championships	Lausanne	44
2006-09-24	BG World Cup	Beijing	37
2006-11-05	BG World Cup	Cancun	DNF
2006-11-01	Team World Championships	Cancun	1
2007-03-25	BG World Cup	Mooloolaba	DNF
2007-05-06	BG World Cup	Lisbon	DNF
2007-05-13	BG World Cup	Richards Bay	31
2007-06-10	BG World Cup	Vancouver	19
2007-06-29	European Championships	Copenhagen	20
2007-07-29	BG World Cup	Salford	27
2007-08-11	BG World Cup	Tiszaújváros	37
2007-08-30	BG World Championships	Hamburg	DNF
2007-09-15	BG World Cup	Beijing	DNF
2007-11-04	BG World Cup	Cancun	22
2007-12-01	BG World Cup	Eilat	23
2008-04-26	BG World Cup	Tongyeong	15
2008-05-10	European Championships	Lisbon	20
2008-05-25	BG World Cup	Madrid	DNF
2008-06-05	BG World Championships	Vancouver	DNF
2008-08-18	Olympic Games	Beijing	DNF
2008-09-13	European Cup	Vienna	9
2009-07-02	European Championships	Holten	30
2009-08-23	European Cup	Carlsbad (Karlovy Vary)	13
2010-05-22	European Cup	Senec	12
2010-08-22	European Cup	Carlsbad (Karlovy Vary)	5
2010-10-24	Premium European Cup	Alanya	10

BG = the sponsor British Gas · DNF = did not finish · DNS = did not start
