= Florence Dinichert =

Swiss modern pentathlete

Personal information
- Born: 7 March 1977 (age 48)

Sport
- Country: Switzerland
- Sport: Modern pentathlon

Florence Dinichert (born 7 March 1977) is a Swiss modern pentathlete. She represented Switzerland at the 2000 Summer Olympics held in Sydney, Australia in the women's modern pentathlon and she finished in 12th place.
