= 2017 European Modern Pentathlon Championships =

The 2017 European Modern Pentathlon Championships is held in Minsk, Belarus from 17 to 24 July 2017.

== Medal summary ==
=== Men's events ===
Event	Gold	Silver	Bronze
Individual	Aleksander Lesun (RUS)	Róbert Kasza (HUN)	Valentin Belaud (FRA)
Team	Hungary; Róbert Kasza; Bence Demeter; Ádám Marosi	Russia; Kirill Belyakov; Alexander Savkin; Aleksander Lesun	France; Brice Loubet; Valentin Belaud; Valentin Prades
Relay	Czech Republic; Ondřej Polívka; Martin Bilko	France; Simon Casse; Alexandre Henrard	Germany; Patrick Dogue; Marvin Faly Dogue

=== Women's events ===
Event	Gold	Silver	Bronze
Individual	Anastasiya Prokopenko (BLR)	Sarolta Kovács (HUN)	İlke Özyüksel (TUR)
Team	Italy; Alice Sotero; Gloria Tocchi; Irene Prampolini	Hungary; Zsófia Földházi; Sarolta Kovács; Tamara Alekszejev	Belarus; Volha Silkina; Tatsiana Khaldoba; Anastasiya Prokopenko
Relay	Germany; Annika Schleu; Lena Schöneborn	Russia; Anna Buriak; Alise Fakhrutdinova	Belarus; Katsiaryna Arol; Tatsiana Khaldoba

=== Mixed events ===
Event	Gold	Silver	Bronze
Relay	Russia; Gulnaz Gubaydullina; Kirill Belyakov	Italy; Alessandra Frezza; Pier Paolo Petroni	Hungary; Sarolta Kovács; Róbert Kasza

=== Medal table ===
* Host nation (Belarus)

Rank	Nation	Gold	Silver	Bronze	Total
1	Russia	2	2	0	4
2	Hungary	1	3	1	5
3	Italy	1	1	0	2
4	Belarus*	1	0	2	3
5	Germany	1	0	1	2
6	Czech Republic	1	0	0	1
7	France	0	1	2	3
8	Turkey	0	0	1	1
Totals (8 entries)		7	7	7	21

== Results ==
http://www.uipmworld.org/event/european-senior-championships-1
