= Zhanna Shubyonok =

Belarusian modern pentathlete

Personal information
- Nationality: Belarusian
- Born: 13 November 1970 (age 54)

Sport
- Sport: Modern pentathlon

Zhanna Shubyonok (born 13 November 1970) is a Belarusian modern pentathlete. She competed in the women's individual event at the 2000 Summer Olympics.
