= Jeanette Malm =

Swedish modern pentathlete

Personal information
- Born: 21 February 1972 (age 53); Stockholm, Sweden

Sport
- Country: Sweden
- Sport: Modern pentathlon

Jeanette Malm (born 21 February 1972 in Stockholm) is a Swedish modern pentathlete. She represented Sweden at the 2000 Summer Olympics held in Sydney, Australia in the women's modern pentathlon and she finished in 17th place.
