= Vasileios Floros =

Greek modern pentathlete (born 1985)

Personal information
- Nationality: Greek
- Born: 24 January 1985 (age 40); Athens, Greece

Sport
- Sport: Modern pentathlon

Vasileios Floros (born 24 January 1985) is a Greek modern pentathlete. He competed in the men's individual event at the 2004 Summer Olympics.
