= Modern pentathlon at the 2000 Summer Olympics =

Modern pentathlon at the Games of the XXVII Olympiad
- Venue: Sydney International Aquatic Centre; Sydney Baseball Stadium; The Dome and Exhibition Complex
- Dates: 30 September – 1 October 2000
- Competitors: 48 from 24 nations

The modern pentathlon at the 2000 Summer Olympics in Sydney was held from 30 September to 1 October 2000. The men's and women's events each involved 24 athletes. The venues for the events were The Dome and Exhibition Complex (fencing and shooting), the Sydney International Aquatic Centre (swimming), and Sydney Baseball Stadium (horse riding and cross-country running). For the first time in Olympic history, modern pentathlon at these Olympic games had the highest ratio of NOC representation with respect to its quota out of all the sports, and also, the women's event was officially included in the program.

Great Britain was also the most successful nation, topping the medal table with two medals. Stephanie Cook of Great Britain won the inaugural women's event. Her compatriot Kate Allenby took the bronze medal, while Emily de Riel of the United States claimed the silver. The Eastern European nations, on the other hand, dominated the men's event, as Dmitry Svatkovsky of Russia won the gold, followed by Hungary's Gábor Balogh and Belarus' Pavel Dovgal, who each obtained silver and bronze medals, respectively.

== Format ==
Modern pentathlon contained five events; pistol shooting, épée fencing, 200 m freestyle swimming, show jumping, and a 3 km cross-country run. They were held in that order, with each segment awarding points to competitors based on their performance in the segment. The points from each of the events were summed to give a final ranking; in addition, the running segment at the end of the day used a staggered start designed so that the order in which runners finished would be the same as their ranking by total points.

== Medalists ==
Event	Gold	Silver	Bronze
Men's	Dmitry Svatkovsky; Russia	Gábor Balogh; Hungary	Pavel Dovgal; Belarus
Women's	Stephanie Cook; Great Britain	Emily de Riel; United States	Kate Allenby; Great Britain

== Medal summary ==
=== Medal table ===
Rank	Nation	Gold	Silver	Bronze	Total
1	Great Britain	1	0	1	2
2	Russia	1	0	0	1
3	Hungary	0	1	0	1
3	United States	0	1	0	1
5	Belarus	0	0	1	1
Totals (5 entries)		2	2	2	6
