= Sara Bertoli =

Italian modern pentathlete (born 1979)

Personal information
- Nationality: Italy
- Born: 5 May 1979 (age 47) Rome, Italy
- Height: 1.72 m (5 ft 7 1/2 in)
- Weight: 58 kg (128 lb)

Sport
- Sport: Modern pentathlon
- Club: Gruppo Sportivo Fiamme; Azzurre
- Coached by: Luigi Filipponi
Medal record
Women's modern pentathlon
Representing Italy
World Championships
Silver medal – second place	2002 San Francisco	Relay
Bronze medal – third place	2005 Warsaw	Relay

Sara Bertoli (born 5 May 1979 in Rome) is an Italian modern pentathlete. She won two medals, silver and bronze, in the women's relay event at the 2002 and 2004 World Championships in San Francisco, California, United States and in Warsaw, Poland, respectively. Bertoli is a member of the modern pentathlon team for Gruppo Sportivo Fiamme Azzurre, and is coached and trained by Luigi Filipponi.

Bertoli qualified for the 2008 Summer Olympics in Beijing, where she competed in women's modern pentathlon, along with her teammate Claudia Corsini. During the competition, Bertoli struggled to attain a higher position in the early rounds, with poor scores in pistol shooting, in one-touch épée fencing, and in freestyle swimming. She managed to improve her performance in the show jumping segment, but dropped to thirty-fourth position, when her horse Naonao repeatedly knocked off numerous obstacles, and suddenly fell her to the ground. In the end, Bertoli finished the event with cross-country running in thirty-second place, for a total score of 4,956 points.

Her sister, Evelina Bertoli (born 8 July 1986), is an Olympic Italian eventing rider. She competed at the 2021 and 2023 European Championships, and at the 2022 World Championships in Pratoni del Vivaro. In 2024 she competed at the 2024 Summer Olympics in Paris.
