= Tetiana Nakazna =

Ukrainian modern pentathlete

Personal information
- Nationality: Ukrainian
- Born: 6 August 1972 (age 52)

Sport
- Sport: Modern pentathlon

Tetiana Nakazna (born 6 August 1972) is a Ukrainian modern pentathlete. She competed in the women's individual event at the 2000 Summer Olympics.
