= Alexandre Henrard =

French modern pentathlete

Personal information
- Nationality: French
- Born: 11 July 1992 (age 33) Coutances, France

Sport
- Country: France
- Sport: Modern pentathlon
Medal record
World Championships
Gold medal – first place	2018 Mexico City	Relay
Bronze medal – third place	2016 Moscow	Relay
Bronze medal – third place	2018 Mexico City	Mixed relay
European Championships
Silver medal – second place	2017 Minsk	Relay
Bronze medal – third place	2022 Székesfehérvár	Relay
UIPM Biathle World Championships
Gold medal – first place	2015 Batumi	Men's senior
Gold medal – first place	2016 Sarasota	Men's senior
Silver medal – second place	2017 Viveiro	Men's senior

Alexandre Henrard (born 11 July 1992) is a French modern pentathlete.

He participated at the 2018 World Modern Pentathlon Championships, winning a medal.

He is the son of swimmer Isabelle Lefèvre and brother of volleyball player Roxane Henrard.
