= Manuel Pradillo =

Mexican modern pentathlete (born 1975)

Personal information
- Born: 8 February 1975 (age 50); Mexico City, Mexico

Sport
- Sport: Modern pentathlon

Manuel Pradillo (born 8 February 1975) is a Mexican modern pentathlete. He competed in the men's individual event at the 2004 Summer Olympics.
