= Andrzej Stefanek =

Polish modern pentathlete

Personal information
- Nationality: Polish
- Born: 16 June 1972 (age 52); Zielona Góra, Poland

Sport
- Sport: Modern pentathlon

Andrzej Stefanek (born 16 June 1972) is a Polish modern pentathlete. He competed in the men's individual event at the 2004 Summer Olympics.
