= Eszter Hortobagyi =

Australian modern pentathlete

Personal information
- Nationality: Australia
- Born: July 6, 1976 (age 48); Budapest, Hungary

Sport
- Sport: Modern pentathlon

Eszter Hortobagyi (born July 6, 1976, in Budapest) is a Hungarian-born Australian modern pentathlete. She placed 20th in the women's individual event at the 2004 Summer Olympics.

Hortobagyi competed for Hungary in her youth, where she won a world junior championship. After learning in 1995 that the 1996 Summer Olympics would not include a women's modern pentathlon event, she ceased her international competition. She migrated to Australia in 1997 and gained Australian citizenship in 2002. While she reentered the sport before the 2000 Summer Olympics in Sydney, which introduced a women's event, she was unable to qualify for the Olympics due to the birth of her son. When interviewed during the 2004 Olympics, she stated that although modern pentathletes have more resources available in Hungary, she preferred the less competitive atmosphere in Australia as it allowed her to spend more time with her family.

At the Olympics, Hortobagyi had her best results in the equestrian and cross-country running events, where she placed fifth and eleventh respectively in the 32-person field. She finished 18th in shooting and 26th in swimming; her worst event was fencing, where she placed 29th. Despite hoping for a top-ten finish, she expressed happiness with her results, saying that she "wanted to take each event separately" and was satisfied with all but the fencing portion.

Hortobagyi studied at the University of New South Wales after moving to Australia. She currently works as a trainer for junior Australian pentathletes.
