= Claudia Cerutti =

Italian modern pentathlete (born 1972)

Personal information
- Born: 3 March 1972 (age 53); Rome, Italy

Sport
- Country: Italy
- Sport: Modern pentathlon

Claudia Cerutti (born 3 March 1972) is an Italian modern pentathlete. She represented Italy at the 2000 Summer Olympics held in Sydney, Australia in the women's modern pentathlon and she finished in 9th place.
