= Niklaus Brünisholz =

Swiss modern pentathlete

Personal information
- Nationality: Swiss
- Born: 7 November 1978 (age 46)

Sport
- Sport: Modern pentathlon

Niklaus Brünisholz (born 7 November 1978) is a Swiss modern pentathlete. He competed in the men's individual event at the 2004 Summer Olympics.
