= Daniel dos Santos (modern pentathlete) =

Brazilian modern pentathlete

Personal information
- Full name: Daniel Vargas dos Santos
- Nationality: Brazilian
- Born: 31 October 1978 (age 46)

Sport
- Sport: Modern pentathlon

Daniel Vargas dos Santos (born 31 October 1978) is a Brazilian modern pentathlete. He competed in the men's individual event at the 2004 Summer Olympics.
