= Tiago Sousa =

Portuguese modern pentathlete

Personal information
- Nationality: Portuguese
- Born: Tiago Daniel Fonseca de Sousa; October 29, 1984 (age 41) Lisbon
- Height: 1.88 m (6 ft 2 in)
- Weight: 77 kg (170 lb)

Sport
- Country: Portugal
- Sport: Modern Pentathlon
Medal record
Men's modern pentathlon
Representing Portugal
Triathle World Championships
Gold medal – first place	2014 Guatemala	Individual
Bronze medal – third place	2019 Saint Petersbourg USA	Individual
Biathle World Championships
Bronze medal – third place	2014 Guatemala	Individual
Gold medal – first place	2019 Saint Petersbourg USA	Individual
- Updated on 27 December 2014

Tiago Sousa (born 29 October 1984) is a Portuguese athlete who competes in the modern pentathlon.
