= Karina Gerber =

South African modern pentathlete

Personal information
- Born: 18 May 1977 (age 48)

Sport
- Country: South Africa
- Sport: Modern pentathlon

Karina Gerber (born 18 May 1977) is a South African modern pentathlete. She represented South Africa at the 2000 Summer Olympics held in Sydney, Australia in the women's modern pentathlon and she finished in 18th place.
