= Wang Jinlin =

Chinese modern pentathlete

Personal information
- Born: 13 April 1972 (age 52)

Sport
- Country: China
- Sport: Modern pentathlon

Wang Jinlin (born 13 April 1972) is a Chinese modern pentathlete. She represented China at the 2000 Summer Olympics held in Sydney, Australia in the women's modern pentathlon and she finished in 20th place.
