= Marina Kolonina =

Russian modern pentathlete

Personal information
- Full name: Marina Sergeyevna Kolonina
- Nationality: Russia
- Born: 3 February 1970 (age 56) Moscow, Russia
- Height: 1.72 m (5 ft 7 1/2 in)
- Weight: 54 kg (119 lb)

Sport
- Sport: Modern pentathlon
- Club: Trade unions, Спартак, Dynamo Moskva
Medal record
Women's modern pentathlon
Representing Russia
World Championships
Gold medal – first place	1999 Budapest	Team
Silver medal – second place	2003 Pesaro	Team
Silver medal – second place	2003 Pesaro	Relay
Bronze medal – third place	2002 San Francisco	Team
Bronze medal – third place	2004 Moscow	Team
European Championship
Gold medal – first place	1999 Tampere	Team
Bronze medal – third place	1998 Warsaw	Team

Marina Kolonina (Russian: Марина Колонина born February 3, 1970, in Moscow) is a Russian modern pentathlete.
