= Fabiana Fares =

Italian modern pentathlete (born 1972)

Personal information
- Born: 28 May 1972 (age 53)

Sport
- Country: Italy
- Sport: Modern pentathlon

Fabiana Fares (born 28 May 1972) is an Italian modern pentathlete. She represented Italy at the 2000 Summer Olympics held in Sydney, Australia in the women's modern pentathlon and she finished in 24th place.
