= 2004 World Modern Pentathlon Championships =

2004 World Championships
- Location: Moscow, Russia
- Dates: 29 May–1 June

The 2004 World Modern Pentathlon Championship held in Moscow, Russia from May 29 to June 1.

== Medal summary ==
=== Men's events ===
Event	(gold) Gold	(silver) Silver	(bronze) Bronze
Individual	Andrejus Zadneprovskis (LTU)	Lee Choon-Huan (KOR)	Libor Capalini (CZE)
Team	Russia; Rustem Sabirkhuzin; Aleksey Lebedinets; Andrey Moiseyev	Czech Republic; Libor Capalini; Michal Michalik; Michal Sedlecky	Italy; Stefano Pecci; Andrea Valentini; Enrico dell'Amore
Relay	Russia; Aleksey Turkin; Andrey Moiseyev; Dmitriy Galkin	United States; Scott Christie; Chad Senior; Vahktang Iagorashvili	South Korea; Han Do-Ryung; Lee Choon-Huan; Kim In-Hong

=== Women's events ===
Event	(gold) Gold	(silver) Silver	(bronze) Bronze
Individual	Zsuzsanna Vörös (HUN)	Kate Allenby (GBR)	Tatsiana Mazurkevich (BLR)
Team	United Kingdom; Kate Allenby; Georgina Harland; Joanna Clark	Belarus; Galina Bachlakova; Anastasiya Samusevich; Tatsiana Mazurkevich	Russia; Olesya Velichko; Tatyana Muratova; Marina Kolonina
Relay	Poland; Paulina Boenisz; Marta Dziadura; Magdalena Sedziak	Belarus; Hanna Arkhipenka; Anastasiya Samusevich; Tatsiana Mazurkevich	France; Amélie Caze; Axelle Guiguet; Blandine Lacheze

== Medal table ==
* Host nation (Russia)

Rank	Nation	Gold	Silver	Bronze	Total
1	Russia (RUS)*	2	0	1	3
2	Great Britain (GBR)	1	1	0	2
3	Hungary (HUN)	1	0	0	1
3	Lithuania (LTU)	1	0	0	1
3	Poland (POL)	1	0	0	1
6	Belarus (BLR)	0	2	1	3
7	Czech Republic (CZE)	0	1	1	2
7	South Korea (KOR)	0	1	1	2
9	United States (USA)	0	1	0	1
10	France (FRA)	0	0	1	1
10	Italy (ITA)	0	0	1	1
Totals (11 entries)		6	6	6	18

== See also ==
- World Modern Pentathlon Championship
