= Tomáš Svoboda (triathlete) =

Czech triathlete and aquathlete

Medal record

Representing Czech Republic

Men's aquathlon

ETU Aquathlon European Championships
Gold medal – first place	2015 Cologne	Elite
Silver medal – second place	2018 Ibiza	Elite

Men's biathle

UIPM Biathle World Championships
Bronze medal – third place	2012 Dubai	Men's senior
Gold medal – first place	2013 Limassol	Men's senior
Silver medal – second place	2015 Batumi	Men's senior
Silver medal – second place	2016 Sarasota	Men's senior
Silver medal – second place	2016 Sarasota	Mixed Relay senior
Gold medal – first place	2017 Viveiro	Men's senior
Gold medal – first place	2017 Viveiro	Men's team
Silver medal – second place	2017 Viveiro	Mixed Relay
Silver medal – second place	2018 Hurghada	Men's senior

UIPM Biathle European Championships
Gold medal – first place	2018 Weiden	Men's senior
Gold medal – first place	2018 Weiden	Mixed Relay senior

Men's quadrathlon

WQF Long Quadrathlon World Championships
Gold medal – first place	2017 Křetínka	Relay
Gold medal – first place	2018 Hannover	Elite
Gold medal – first place	2018 Hannover	Relay

WQF Middle Quadrathlon World Championships
Silver medal – second place	2018 Týn nad Vltavou	Elite

WQF Sprint Quadrathlon World Championships
Silver medal – second place	2017 Komárno	Elite
Gold medal – first place	2017 Komárno	Relay
Gold medal – first place	2018 Ratscher am Bergsee	Elite
Gold medal – first place	2018 Ratscher am Bergsee	Relay

WQF Middle Quadrathlon European Championships
Gold medal – first place	2018 Křetínka	Elite
Gold medal – first place	2018 Křetínka	Relay

WQF Sprint Quadrathlon European Championships
Gold medal – first place	2017 Ratscher am Bergsee	Elite
Gold medal – first place	2018 Terceira	Relay

Tomáš Svoboda (born 19 March 1985) is a professional Czech triathlete and aquathlete. He won gold at the 2015 ETU European Aquathlon Championships, and is two time UIPM biathle World Champion (2013, 2017) Tomáš is the twin brother of David Svoboda, 2012 Olympic Champion in the sport of Modern Pentathlon.
