= 2016 World Modern Pentathlon Championships – Men's relay =

Men's relay at the 2016 UIPM Senior World Championships
- Dates: May 24
- Competitors: 34 from 17 nations
- Winning points: 1563

Medalists
gold medal	Hwang Woo-jin; Jun Woong-tae	South Korea
silver medal	Ilia Frolov; Oleg Naumov	Russia
bronze medal	Alexandre Henrard; Pierre Dejardin	France

The men's relay at the 2016 UIPM Senior World Championships was held on 24 May 2016.

== Results ==
Breakdown is as follows:

Rank	Country	Athletes	Fencing Victories (pts)	Swimming Time (pts)	Riding Time (pts)	Combined Time (pts)	Total
1st place, gold medalist(s)	South Korea	Hwang Woo-jin; Jun Woong-tae	24 (266)	1:49.77 (371)	83.00 (279)	10:53.98 (647)	1563
2nd place, silver medalist(s)	Russia	Ilia Frolov; Oleg Naumov	17 (218)	1:54.01 (358)	81.00 (300)	10:26.95 (674)	1550
3rd place, bronze medalist(s)	France	Alexandre Henrard; Pierre Dejardin	18 (213)	1:56.42 (351)	89.00 (286)	10:26.18 (674)	1524
4	Latvia	Ruslan Nakonechnyi; Pāvels Švecovs	19 (229)	1:50.05 (370)	79.00 (265)	10:50.21 (650)	1514
5	Belarus	Kirill Kasyanik; Pavel Tsikhanau	15 (202)	1:55.59 (354)	79.00 (300)	10:44.54 (656)	1512
6	Hungary	Krisztián Strobl; István Málits	15 (201)	1:56.84 (350)	84.00 (300)	10:45.75 (655)	1506
7	Ukraine	Dmytro Kirpulyanskyy; Vladislav Mishchenko	16 (208)	1:54.70 (356)	96.00 (272)	10:36.73 (664)	1500
8	Czech Republic	Martin Bilko; David Kindl	16 (209)	1:53.44 (360)	88.00 (269)	10:49.72 (651)	1489
9	Great Britain	Thomas Toolis; Joseph Evans	14 (194)	1:49.62 (372)	88.00 (269)	10:47.95 (653)	1488
10	Kazakhstan	Igor Sozinov; Denis Tyurin	21 (243)	1:58.18 (346)	88.00 (262)	11:09.41 (631)	1482
11	Italy	Alessandro Colasanti; Giuseppe Parisi	13 (187)	1:57.11 (349)	95.00 (266)	10:26.20 (674)	1476
12	Argentina	Emanuel Zapata; Sergio Villamayor	16 (208)	2:00.24 (340)	80.00 (293)	11:57.04 (583)	1424
13	Poland	Remigiusz Golis; Maciej Baranowski	13 (168)	1:52.33 (363)	113.00 (235)	10:51.09 (649)	1415
14	Germany	Alexander Nobis; Matthias Sandten	16 (211)	1:55.23 (355)	EL (0)	10:39.08 (661)	1227
15	Mexico	Alvaro Sandoval; Ismael Hernández	11 (177)	1:52.78 (362)	EL (0)	10:18.40 (682)	1221
16	United States	Sam Ruddock; Justin Torrellas	17 (216)	2:00.73 (338)	DNS (0)	11:25.75 (615)	1169
17	South Africa	Pieter Oosthuizen; Berndt Burger	8 (152)	2:02.77 (332)	EL (0)	10:42.16 (658)	1142
