= Emma Davis =

Northern Ireland-born Irish triathlete

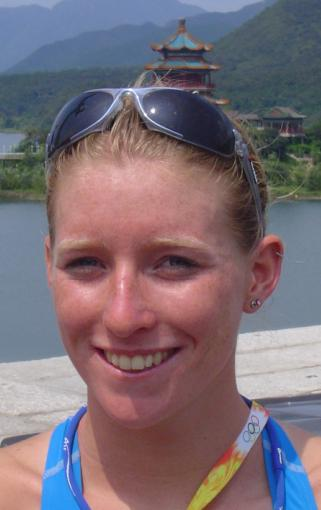
- Davis at the 2008 Summer Olympics

Personal information
- Born: 4 July 1987 (age 38) Bangor, County Down, Northern Ireland
- Height: 1.65 m (5 ft 5 in)
- Weight: 48 kg (106 lb)

Sport
- Country: Ireland
Medal record
Representing Ireland / Northern Ireland
Women's Biathle
UIPM Biathle World Championships
Gold medal – first place	2007 Monaco	Women's senior
Women's Triathlon
Irish National Championships
Gold medal – first place	Irish National Championships	2006
Gold medal – first place	Irish National Championships	2008

Emma Davis (born 4 July 1987, Bangor, County Down) is a Northern Ireland-born Irish triathlete who competed in the 2008 Summer Olympics.

Davis became Ireland's first ever Olympic qualifier for the Triathlon when her 15th place at the 2008 World Championships guaranteed her enough ranking points. She finished 37th in the Triathlon at the 2008 Summer Olympics event competing with two fractures in her sacrum due to a bike crash that occurred during the pre-Olympic training camp in Matsue, Japan just a week before.

She continued to compete around the globe, racing on the ETU Cup and ITU Triathlon World Cup series. She was the Biathle World Champion in 2007 and was previously ranked 10th in the World on the ITU ranking list. She is now retired from professional sport and works as a sports therapist in England.
