= Imre Tiidemann =

Estonian modern pentathlete

Personal information
- Born: 24 September 1970 (age 55) Tallinn, then part of Estonian SSR, Soviet Union

Sport
- Sport: Modern pentathlon

Imre Tiidemann (born 24 September 1970) is an Estonian modern pentathlete. He competed at the 1992, 1996 and 2000 Summer Olympics.
