= 2005 World Modern Pentathlon Championships =

World morden penthathlon

2005 World Championships
- Location: Warsaw, Poland
- Dates: 6–8 August

The 2005 World Modern Pentathlon Championships were held in Warsaw, Poland from August 6 to August 8.

== Medal summary ==
=== Men's events ===
Event	(gold) Gold	(silver) Silver	(bronze) Bronze
Individual	Qian Zhenhua (CHN)	Aleksey Turkin (RUS)	Andrey Moiseyev (RUS)
Team	Russia; Rustem Sabirkhuzin; Aleksey Lebedinets; Andrey Moiseyev	Czech Republic; Libor Capalini; Michal Michalík; Michal Sedlecký	Germany; Sebastian Dietz; Steffen Gebhardt; Eric Walther
Relay	Hungary; Ákos Kállai; Sándor Fülep; Viktor Horváth	Russia; Aleksey Turkin; Rustem Sabirkhuzin; Pavel Sazonov	Czech Republic; Libor Capalini; Michal Michalík; David Svoboda

=== Women's events ===
Event	(gold) Gold	(silver) Silver	(bronze) Bronze
Individual	Claudia Corsini (ITA)	Zsuzsanna Vörös (HUN)	Elena Rublevska (LAT)
Team	Russia; Lyudmila Sirotkina; Tatyana Muratova; Yevdokiya Gretchichnikova	Hungary; Zsuzsanna Vörös; Adrienn Szatmári; Csilla Füri	Poland; Edita Maloszyc; Paulina Boenisz; Sylwia Czwojdzinska
Relay	Germany; Lena Schoneborn; Elena Reiche; Kim Raisner	Russia; Lyudmila Sirotkina; Tatyana Muratova; Olessiya Velitchko	Italy; Claudia Corsini; Sara Bertoli; Alessia Pieretti

== Medal table ==
* Host nation (Poland)

Rank	Nation	Gold	Silver	Bronze	Total
1	Russia (RUS)	2	3	1	6
2	Hungary (HUN)	1	2	0	3
3	Germany (GER)	1	0	1	2
3	Italy (ITA)	1	0	1	2
5	China (CHN)	1	0	0	1
6	Czech Republic (CZE)	0	1	1	2
7	Latvia (LAT)	0	0	1	1
7	Poland (POL)*	0	0	1	1
Totals (8 entries)		6	6	6	18

== See also ==
- World Modern Pentathlon Championship
