= Elena Reiche =

German modern pentathlete

Personal information
- Born: 26 September 1979 (age 45)

Sport
- Country: Germany
- Sport: Modern pentathlon

Elena Reiche (born 26 September 1979) is a German modern pentathlete. She represented Germany at the 2000 Summer Olympics held in Sydney, Australia in the women's modern pentathlon and she finished in 21st place.
