= Raouf Abdou =

Egyptian modern pentathlete (born 1981)

Personal information
- Nationality: Egyptian
- Born: 1 December 1981 (age 43); Cairo, Egypt
- Height: 1.65 m (5 ft 5 in)
- Weight: 60 kg (130 lb)

Sport
- Sport: Modern pentathlon

Raouf Abdou (born 1 December 1981) is an Egyptian modern pentathlete. He competed in the 2004 Summer Olympics.
