= Halina Bashlakova =

Belarusian modern pentathlete (born 1973)

Personal information
- Nationality: Belarus
- Born: 19 March 1973 (age 53)
- Height: 1.72 m (5 ft 7 1/2 in)
- Weight: 63 kg (139 lb)

Sport
- Sport: Modern pentathlon
- Club: Dynamo Minsk
Medal record
Women's modern pentathlon
Representing Belarus
World Championships
Silver medal – second place	2004 Moscow	Team
Bronze medal – third place	1999 Budapest	Relay
Bronze medal – third place	2000 Pesaro	Relay

Halina Bashlakova (also Galina Bashlakova, Belarusian: Галіна Башлакова; born 19 March 1973) is a modern pentathlete from Belarus. She competed at the 2004 Summer Olympics in Athens, Greece, where she finished twenty-first in the women's event, with a score of 4,944 points.

Bashlakova is also a three-time medalist at the World Championships, winning a silver and two bronze in both team and relay events.
