= Richard Stannard (triathlete) =

Medal record

Representing Great Britain

Men's aquathlon

ITU Aquathlon World Championships
Silver medal – second place	2001 Edmonton	Elite
Gold medal – first place	2003 Queenstown	Elite
Gold medal – first place	2006 Lausanne	Elite
Gold medal – first place	2011 Beijing	Elite
Silver medal – second place	2012 Auckland	Elite

Men's biathle

UIPM Biathle World Championships
Gold medal – first place	2005 Monaco	Men's senior
Gold medal – first place	2007 Monaco	Men's senior
Gold medal – first place	2010 Dubai	Men's senior
Gold medal – first place	2012 Dubai	Men's senior

Richard Stannard (born April 1974) is a triathlete from Great Britain and four time Biathle world champion. He is nicknamed "The Fish" due to the strength of his swimming, and is the current British Masters record holder in the 200m free, 400m free, 800m free and 1500m free categories.

He was British triathlon champion in 2001, aquathlon world champion in 2003, 2006 and 2011 and biathle world champion in 2005, 2007, 2010 and 2012.

He also led the swim leg of the London Triathlon for ten years in row from 1997–2006. He was also first out of the water at the 2012 London Triathlon, beating an elite field of international athletes some 10–15 years younger than him.

In 2008, he attended the 2008 Beijing Olympic Games as manager and coach to the Irish triathlon team.
