= Federica Foghetti =

Italian modern pentathlete (born 1968)

Federica Foghetti (born October 14, 1968, in Rome) is an Italian modern pentathlete. She placed 32nd in the women's individual event at the 2004 Summer Olympics.
