= Pavel Dovgal =

Belarusian modern pentathlete (born 1975)

Medal record

Men's modern pentathlon

Representing Belarus

Olympic Games
Bronze medal – third place	2000 Sydney	Individual

Pavel Nikolayevich Dovgal (Belarusian: Павел Мікалаевіч Доўгаль; born 22 December 1975 in Minsk) is a Belarusian former modern pentathlete who won a bronze medal at the 2000 Summer Olympics in Sydney, Australia.
