= Blandine Lachèze =

French modern pentathlete

Personal information
- Nationality: France
- Born: 11 October 1982 (age 43) Fontainebleau, Seine-et-Marne
- Height: 1.72 m (5 ft 7 1/2 in)
- Weight: 60 kg (132 lb)

Sport
- Sport: Modern pentathlon
- Club: Union Sportive Font Romeu Pentathlon
Medal record
Women's modern pentathlon
Representing France
World Championships
Bronze medal – third place	2004 Moscow	Relay

Blandine Lachèze (born October 11, 1982 in Fontainebleau, Seine-et-Marne) is a female modern pentathlete from France. She competed at the 2004 Summer Olympics in Athens, Greece, where she finished nineteenth in the women's event, with a score of 4,988 points.

Lachèze won an individual gold medal at the 2003 Asian Open Championships in Kaohsiung, Chinese Taipei, and a relay bronze at the 2004 World Modern Pentathlon Championships in Moscow, Russia.
