= Alexandra Kalinovská =

Czech modern pentathlete

Alexandra Kalinovská (born March 14, 1974, in Prague) is a Czech modern pentathlete. She placed 26th in the women's individual event at the 2004 Summer Olympics.
