= Hanna Vasilionak =

Belarusian modern pentathlete

Personal information
- Full name: Hanna Arkhipenka-Vasilionak
- Nationality: Belarus
- Born: 16 January 1983 (age 43) Minsk, Belarus
- Height: 1.75 m (5 ft 9 in)
- Weight: 62 kg (137 lb)

Sport
- Sport: Modern pentathlon
- Club: SK VS Minsk
- Coached by: Yrij Berezovskij
Medal record
Women's modern pentathlon
Representing Belarus
World Championships
| Gold medal – first place | 2007 Berlin | Team |
| Silver medal – second place | 2004 Moscow | Relay |

Hanna Arkhipenka-Vasilionak (Belarusian: Ганна Архіпенка Васілёнак; born 16 January 1983 in Minsk) is a modern pentathlete from Belarus. At the 2012 Summer Olympics, she competed in the women's competition, where she finished in thirty-second place.

Vasilionak also won a team gold medal at the 2007 World Modern Pentathlon Championships in Berlin, Germany.
