= Horacio de la Vega =

Mexican modern pentathlete (born 1975)

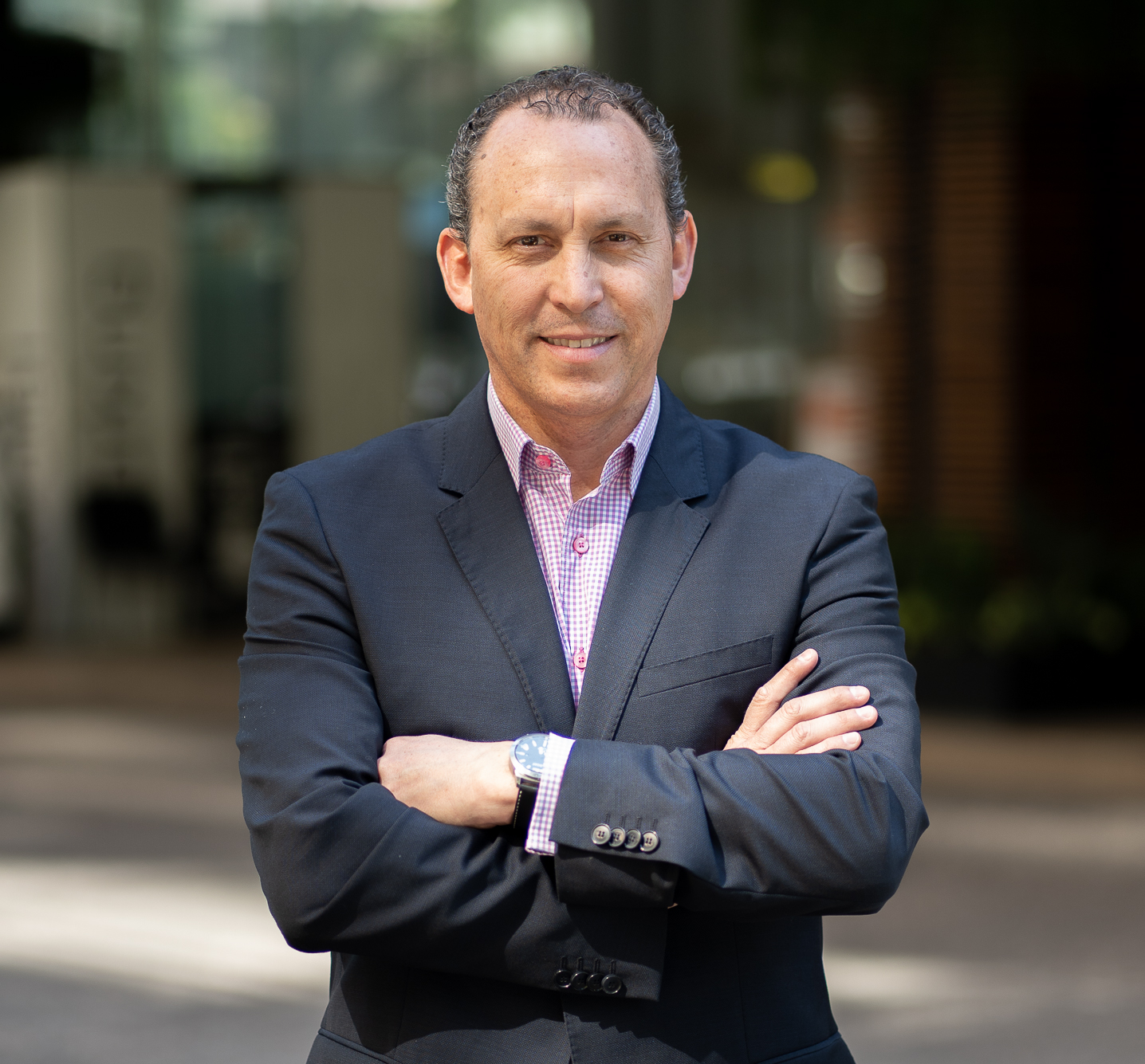

Personal information
- Full name: Horacio de la Vega Flores
- Born: 3 June 1975 (age 50) Mexico

Sport
- Sport: Modern pentathlon

Horacio de la Vega Flores (born 3 June 1975) is a Mexican former modern pentathlete and sports administrator who has served as Executive President of the Mexican League.

== Career ==
De la Vega was modern pentathlon world champion in 1995 and 1998, and competed at the Olympic Games in 1996 and the 2000, where he ranked 23rd and 22nd respectively.

De la Vega began his professional career in the Mexican Army. Later he worked in various sports administration roles in Mexico City. He played a part in the organising of the 2011 Pan American Games in Guadalajara, and acted as an advisor for the 2019 Pan American Games in Lima.

In November 2019, De la Vega became president of the Mexican Baseball League (LMB). In September 2023, he was selected for another five year term as president of the LMB. In 2024 was named president of the LMS.
