= Chad Senior =

American modern pentathlete

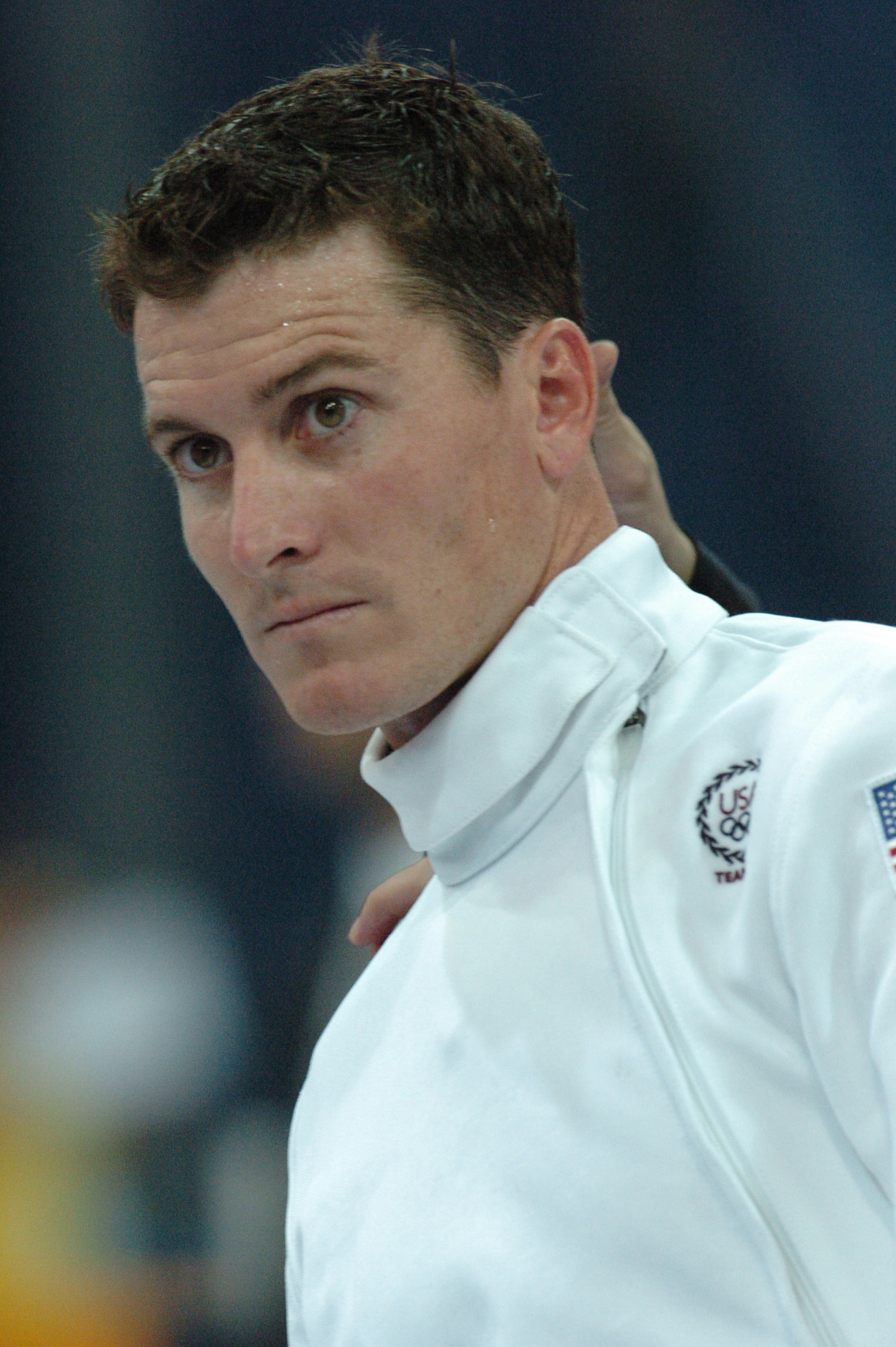
- Senior in 2004

Personal information
- Born: December 27, 1974 (age 51) Fort Myers, Florida, U.S.
- Occupation: Modern pentathlete
Medal record
Representing United States
Men's biathle
World Biathle Championships
Gold medal – first place	1999 Monaco	Men's senior
Men's modern pentathlon
World Modern Pentathlon Championships
Silver medal – second place	2004 Moscow	Relay

Chad Senior (born December 27, 1974) is an American Olympic modern pentathlete.

== Early years ==
Senior grew up in Fort Myers, Florida, and graduated from North Fort Myers High School. During each year at North Fort Myers High School he earned varsity letters in track, cross country and swimming. He was one of the top athletes in southwest Florida and earned many awards and accolades.

Senior graduated from high school in 1993 and went on to attend The George Washington University in Washington, DC, on a full swimming scholarship. He holds school records for the 1,000 Freestyle with a time of 9:20.20 in 1993, and the 1,650 Freestyle with a time of 15:36.48 in 1997.

== Olympic Training ==
Senior graduated in 1997 and joined the United States Army's Elite Athlete program so that he could train for the Olympics. He chose to compete in the modern pentathlon. He competed in many international competitions for several years before his Olympic debut.

== Achievements ==
His first major achievement occurred in 1999, when he won the Conseil International du Sport Militaire (CISM) World Championship team event as a member of the U.S. Army team. Also in 1999, he won the first Biathle World Championship (run-swim-run).

- 2004 Olympic Games, 13th place
- 2000 Olympic Games, 6th place
- 2000 Mexico World Cup, 1st
- 2000 Modern Pentathlon World Championships, 15th (individual); relay, team event, 1st
- 2000 CISM World Championships, 2nd
- 1999 Baltic Cup, 1st
- 1999 Biathle World Championships, 1st
- 1999 CISM World Championships, 1st (team event); 15th (individual)
- 1999 National Championships, 3rd
- 1998 National Championships, 6th

In 2000, Senior entered the 2000 World Championships ranked Number 1 in the world. Although his U.S. men's team won two gold medals in relay and team, he finished a disappointing 15th in individual competition. That same year, Senior had first, third and fourth place finishes at World Cup events.

Senior competed in the 2000 Summer Olympics in Sydney and the 2004 Summer Olympics in Athens. He finished 6th in 2000, and 13th in 2004.

== U.S. Air Force ==
As of 2018, Senior serves as a Lt Col in the U.S. Air Force, specifically a Combat Rescue Officer – a specialist who goes into "austere and non-permissive environments" to save downed air crew members. He is a member of the 920th Rescue Wing and has served two tours in Afghanistan and one in Iraq.
