= Olesya Velichko =

Russian modern pentathlete

Personal information
- Full name: Olesya Yuryevna Velichko
- Nationality: Russia
- Born: 20 May 1981 (age 45) Taraz, Kazakhstan
- Height: 1.55 m (5 ft 1 in)
- Weight: 50 kg (110 lb)

Sport
- Sport: Modern pentathlon
- Club: Dynamo Moskva
Medal record
Women's modern pentathlon
Representing Russia
World Championships
Silver medal – second place	2001 Millfield	Relay
Silver medal – second place	2003 Pesaro	Individual
Silver medal – second place	2003 Pesaro	Team
Silver medal – second place	2003 Pesaro	Relay
Silver medal – second place	2005 Warsaw	Relay
Bronze medal – third place	2001 Millfield	Team
Bronze medal – third place	2004 Moscow	Team

Olesya Yuryevna Velichko (Russian: Олеся Юрьевна Величко; born May 20, 1981, in Taraz, Kazakhstan) is a modern pentathlete from Russia. She is a multiple-time medalist at the World Championships, and a double champion at the 2001 Junior World Championships.

Velichko competed at the 2004 Summer Olympics in Athens, Greece, where she finished seventeenth in the women's event, with a score of 5,016 points.
