= Aurelija Tamašauskaitė =

Lithuanian modern pentathlete (born 1996)

Personal information
- Born: Aurelija Tamašauskaitė; 22 May 1996 (age 30)

Sport
- Sport: Modern pentathlon
Medal record
Representing Lithuania
European Championships
Bronze medal – third place	2022 Székesfehérvár	Team
European Junior Championships
Gold medal – first place	2019 Drzonkow	Individual
Bronze medal – third place	2017 Drzonkow	Individual
Bronze medal – third place	2019 Drzonkow	Mixed Relay

Aurelija Tamašauskaitė (born 22 May 1996) is a Lithuanian modern pentathlete. She began competing in 2011. Tamašauskaitė represented Lithuania at the 2022 European Modern Pentathlon Championships, where she won bronze medal in women's team event.
