= Katalin Partics =

Greek modern pentathlete (born 1976)

Katalin Partics (born October 22, 1976) is a Greek modern pentathlete. She competed in the women's individual modern pentathlon events at the 2000 Summer Olympics, in which she placed 22nd, and the 2004 Summer Olympics, in which she placed 16th.
