= Rustem Sabirkhuzin =

Kazakhstani modern pentathlete

Personal information
- Born: 4 January 1978 (age 48) Ufa, Russian SFSR, Soviet Union
- Height: 1.79 m (5 ft 10 1/2 in)
- Weight: 87 kg (192 lb)

Sport
- Sport: Modern pentathlon
- Coached by: Vadim Chudnovskii
Medal record
Men's modern pentathlon
Representing Russia
World Championships
Gold medal – first place	2004 Moscow	Team
Gold medal – first place	2005 Warsaw	Team
Silver medal – second place	2005 Warsaw	Relay

Rustem Vilevich Sabirkhuzin (Russian: Рустем Вилевич Сабирхузин; born 4 January 1978) is a Kazakh modern pentathlete. He competed at the 2004 and 2012 Summer Olympics. He finished in 10th position at the 2004 Games and in 21st at the 2012 Games.
