= Enrico Dell'Amore =

Italian modern pentathlete (born 1973)

Personal information
- Nationality: Italian
- Born: 3 December 1973 (age 51); Rome, Italy

Sport
- Sport: Modern pentathlon

Enrico Dell'Amore (born 3 December 1973) is an Italian modern pentathlete. He competed in the men's individual event at the 2004 Summer Olympics.
