= Anastasiya Prokopenko =

Belarusian modern pentathlete (born 1985)

Personal information
- Full name: Anastasiya Samusevich-Prokopenko
- Nationality: Belarusian
- Born: 20 September 1985 (age 40) Slutsk, Byelorussia, Soviet Union
- Height: 1.64 m (5 ft 5 in)
- Weight: 60 kg (132 lb)

Sport
- Country: Belarus
- Sport: Modern pentathlon
- Club: SK VS Minsk
- Coached by: Anatoli Tkachenka
Medal record
Women's modern pentathlon
Representing Belarus
Olympic Games
Bronze medal – third place	2008 Beijing	Women's
World Championships
Gold medal – first place	2007 Berlin	Team
Gold medal – first place	2018 Mexico City	Individual
Gold medal – first place	2018 Mexico City	Relay
Gold medal – first place	2019 Budapest	Team
Gold medal – first place	2021 Cairo	Individual
Silver medal – second place	2004 Moscow	Team
Silver medal – second place	2004 Moscow	Relay
Silver medal – second place	2014 Warsaw	Relay
Silver medal – second place	2021 Cairo	Mixed
Bronze medal – third place	2014 Warsaw	Team
Bronze medal – third place	2016 Moscow	Mixed
Bronze medal – third place	2017 Cairo	Individual
Bronze medal – third place	2019 Budapest	Mixed
Bronze medal – third place	2021 Cairo	Team
European Championships
Gold medal – first place	2012 Sofia	Mixed
Gold medal – first place	2017 Minsk	Individual
Gold medal – first place	2021 Nizhny Novgorod	Relay
Silver medal – second place	2019 Bath	Team
Bronze medal – third place	2017 Minsk	Team

Anastasiya Prokopenko, née Samusevich (Belarusian: Настасся Валер’еўна Пракапенка (Самусевіч); Łacinka: Nastassia Samusievič Prakapienka; born 20 September 1985) is a Belarusian modern pentathlete who competed at three Summer Olympics.

== Career ==
In 2018, she was awarded the bronze medal of the women's competition at the 2008 Olympics in Beijing, following the disqualification of Ukraine's Viktoriya Tereshchuk, due to a doping offense. She finished sixth in 2012. Prokopenko also set a world record time of 10:20.90 in the combined running and shooting segment.

Prokopenko also won a team gold medal at the 2007 World Modern Pentathlon Championships in Berlin, Germany, along with her compatriots Tatsiana Mazurkevich and Hanna Vasilionak.

At the 2018 World Modern Pentathlon Championships in Mexico City, Prokopenko won the world title in the women's individual event as well as in the Women's Relay event (together with compatriot Iryna Prasiantsova)
