= Andrea Valentini (pentathlete) =

Italian modern pentathlete (born 1977)

Personal information
- Nationality: Italy
- Born: 10 December 1977 (age 48) Rome, Italy
- Height: 1.80 m (5 ft 11 in)
- Weight: 75 kg (165 lb)

Sport
- Sport: Modern pentathlon
- Club: Gruppo Sportivo Fiamme; Azzurre
- Coached by: Luigi Filipponi
Medal record
Men's modern pentathlon
Representing Italy
World Championships
Bronze medal – third place	2004 Moscow	Team

Andrea Valentini (born December 10, 1977) is an Italian modern pentathlete. He won a bronze medal in the men's team event at the 2004 World Championships in Moscow, Russia. Valentini is a member of the modern pentathlon team for Gruppo Sportivo Fiamme Azzurre, and is coached and trained by Luigi Filipponi.

Valentini first competed for the men's modern pentathlon at the 2004 Summer Olympics in Athens. He displayed a strong performance in the early rounds of the competition, when he achieved a joint second-place finish with Lithuania's Andrejus Zadneprovskis, Latvia's Deniss Čerkovskis, and United States' Vakhtang Iagorashvili in one-touch épée fencing, striking a total of nineteen victories. Valentini recorded the slowest time of 2:18.34, when he finished thirty-second in freestyle swimming, but he quickly moved to the top position with a sixteenth-place finish in show jumping segment. In the end, Valentini successfully finished the event in nineteenth place with a score of 5,084 points.

At the 2008 Summer Olympics in Beijing, Valentini qualified as a 30-year-old for the second time in men's modern pentathlon, along with his teammate Nicola Benedetti. During the competition, Valentini struggled to attain a higher position in the early segments, with poor scores in pistol shooting and in épée fencing. He managed to improve his performance by recording his fastest time of 2:11.70 in freestyle swimming, and by completing the show jumping segment with less obstacle and time penalties. Valentini's best result in the last round was insufficiently enough to reach the top position, finishing only in seventeenth place with a score of 5,288 points.
