= Emily deRiel =

American modern pentathlete (born 1974)

Personal information
- Full name: Emily Ann deRiel
- Nationality: United States
- Born: 12 November 1974 (age 51) Boston, Massachusetts
- Height: 1.78 m (5 ft 10 in)
- Weight: 63 kg (139 lb)

Sport
- Sport: Modern pentathlon
Medal record
Women's modern pentathlon
Representing United States
Olympic Games
Silver medal – second place	2000 Sydney	Individual

Emily Ann deRiel (born November 12, 1974, in Boston, Massachusetts) is a former U.S. modern pentathlete who competed at the 2000 Summer Olympics in Sydney. She won a silver medal in the inaugural women's event, with a score of 5,310 points, just behind Great Britain's Stephanie Cook by an eight-point difference.

She is a graduate of Haverford High School in Haverford Township, Pennsylvania and Yale University.
