= Jeļena Rubļevska =

Latvian modern pentathlete (born 1976)

Personal information
- Born: 23 March 1976 (age 50) Rīga, Latvia
- Height: 172 cm (5 ft 8 in)
- Weight: 59 kg (130 lb)

Sport
- Country: Latvia
- Sport: Modern pentathlon

Achievements and titles
- Olympic finals: Silver (2004)
Medal record
Women's modern pentathlon
Representing Latvia
Olympic Games
Silver medal – second place	2004 Athens	Individual
World Championships
Silver medal – second place	2013 Kaoshiung	Mixed relay
Bronze medal – third place	2005 Warsaw	Individual

Jeļena Rubļevska (born 23 March 1976) is a Latvian modern pentathlete. She won a silver medal at the 2004 Summer Olympics in Athens, Greece, becoming the first woman representing Latvia to win an Olympic medal.

Her score of 5380 at the 2004 Olympics consisted of:

- Shooting—988
- Fencing—1028
- Swimming—1160
- Riding—1116
- Running—1088

Rubļevska has competed in the modern pentathlon at four Olympic games: 2000, 2004, 2008, and 2012.

Her daughter Ieva Maļuka is a Latvian swimmer.
