= Nóra Simóka =

Hungarian modern pentathlete

Personal information
- Born: 10 December 1980 (age 44)

Sport
- Country: Hungary
- Sport: Modern pentathlon

Nóra Simóka (born 10 December 1980) is a Hungarian modern pentathlete. She represented Hungary at the 2000 Summer Olympics held in Sydney, Australia in the women's modern pentathlon and she finished in 23rd place.
