= Steffen Gebhardt =

German modern pentathlete

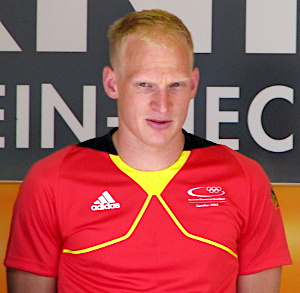
- Gebhardt in 2012

Personal information
- Born: 22 July 1981 (age 44) Neuss, West Germany
- Height: 175 cm (5 ft 9 in) (2012)
- Weight: 75 kg (165 lb) (2012)

Sport
- Sport: Modern pentathlon
Medal record
Men's modern pentathlon
Representing Germany
World Championships
Gold medal – first place	2007 Berlin	Team
Gold medal – first place	2007 Berlin	Relay
Bronze medal – third place	2005 Warsaw	Team

Steffen Gebhardt (born 22 July 1981) is a German modern pentathlete. He competed at the 2004, 2008 and 2012 Summer Olympics.
