= Georgina Harland =

British modern pentathlete (born 1978)

Georgina Harland MBE
Personal information
- Nationality: British
- Born: 14 April 1978 (age 48) Canterbury, Kent

Sport
- Country: Great Britain
- Sport: Modern Pentathlon
- Team: Team Bath
Medal record
Women's modern pentathlon
Representing Great Britain
Olympic Games
Bronze medal – third place	2004 Athens	Individual
World Championships
Gold medal – first place	2004 Moscow	Team
Silver medal – second place	2006 Guatemala	Team
Silver medal – second place	2006 Guatemala	Team Relay
Bronze medal – third place	2001 Millfield	Individual
Bronze medal – third place	2002 San Francisco	Individual
European Championships
Gold medal – first place	2003 Usti Nad Labem	Individual
Gold medal – first place	2007 Riga	Team Relay

Georgina Claire Seccombe MBE (née Harland; born 14 April 1978) is a former modern pentathlete from Great Britain. Having been a reserve for the British team for the 2000 Summer Olympics, she was chosen for the team proper for the 2004 Games in Athens, Greece, winning the bronze medal in the women's individual event. She retired from professional sport at the end of 2008 due to a career ending injury ahead of the 2008 Games.

== Early life ==
Georgina Harland was involved in sport from an early age, having taken up riding with The Pony Club, swimming with the City of Canterbury Swimming Club and cross-country running for Great Britain. She was educated at Wellesley House School and Benenden School both of which are in Kent. Whilst at Loughborough University she began competing in modern pentathlon.

== Career ==
Harland was chosen as a non-travelling reserve for the 2000 Summer Olympics, with Steph Cook and Kate Allenby taking the two British spots in the women's modern pentathlon. She described herself as having been "devastated" at the decision, but supported her friends and training partners through the Games.

She won the 2003 European Champions, which qualified her for the 2004 Summer Olympics as she had finished ahead of fellow Brit Sian Lewis. She went into the Games as world number one, hoping to emulate the gold medal victory of Steph Cook in the previous Olympics. She said that the shooting event was her worst out of the five events. Two weeks prior to the Games she suffered a stress fracture in her right leg, requiring an orthopaedic cast.

In the first round of Olympic competition, the shooting, she scored 156 points out of 200 which left her sitting in 30th place out of 32 competitors. The fencing round saw her move up to 26th after winning 16 of the 31 one on one matches against the other pentathletes. She finished second in the swimming with a time of 2:14:60, moving her further up to 19th overall. After finishing the showjumping as the fourth event, she moved up to fourteenth overall. She mounted a comeback in the final event, the cross-country, and completed the race over thirty seconds faster than anyone else, moving her up to third place and winning the bronze medal. She had started 51 seconds behind the third placed athlete, Claudia Corsini, and needed to overtake twelve athletes during the race.

During the build up to the 2008 Summer Olympics, Harland won the third World Cup event of 2007, which was Harland's first event of the year. However, she suffered an injury prior to the Games and failed to qualify. She retired at the close of the 2008 season. During her professional career, she maintained a top five ranking worldwide between 2001 and 2008.

== Sports administration ==
Harland moved into sports administration after retirement. She was named on the Mission 2012 panel by UK Sport in 2011. As of 2013, she is working for the British Olympic Association. On 20 May 2020, she was announced as Team GB's Chef de Mission for the Beijing 2022 Olympic Winter Games.

Harland was appointed Member of the Order of the British Empire (MBE) in the 2022 Birthday Honours for services to Olympic sport.

== Personal life ==
Harland married Charlie Seccombe, a former hockey coach at Reading and Director of GB&I - Dyson Professional, on 27 August 2011 in Canterbury, Kent.
