= Mary Beth Iagorashvili =

American modern pentathlete (born 1974)

Personal information
- Born: Mary Beth Larsen; July 28, 1974 (age 51) Waukesha, Wisconsin, U.S.
- Home town: Minneapolis, Minnesota
- Height: 5 ft 6 in (1.67 m)
- Weight: 119 lb (54 kg)

Sport
- Country: United States
- Sport: Modern pentathlon
Medal record
Women's modern pentathlon
Representing United States
Pan American Games
Gold medal – first place	1999 Winnipeg	Individual
Bronze medal – third place	2003 Santo Domingo	Individual

Mary Beth Iagorashvili (née Larsen, born July 28, 1974) is a retired American modern pentathlete. She is also the first U.S. female modern pentathlete and one of the twenty-four athletes to participate in the first-ever women's event at the 2000 Summer Olympics in Sydney.

Larsen was a 1994 graduate of the New Mexico Military Institute (NMMI). In 1999, she married Georgian-born modern pentathlete Vakhtang Iagorashvili, who won an individual bronze medal at the 1988 Summer Olympics in Seoul.

Iagorashvili emerged as one of the top favorites to win the women's modern pentathlon in the early 2000s. She won the gold medal at the 1999 Pan American Games in Winnipeg, Manitoba, Canada, and bronze at the 2003 Pan American Games in Santo Domingo, Dominican Republic, which both obtained her qualifying places for the Olympic games. With her husband being ineligible to compete because of citizenship issues, Iagorashvili competed in Sydney for the Olympic Games, and finished fourth in the women's event with a score of 5,129 points. Following her fourth-place finish, Iagorashvili continued to build her success in modern pentathlon, as she became the national champion in 2002. She later competed with her husband at the 2004 Summer Olympics in Athens, after winning medals at the Pan American Games. She finished fifteenth in the women's event with a score of 5,052 points.

After the Olympics, Iagorashvili retired from her sport, and after graduating from Logan College of Chiropractic in December 2001, began her practice in Texas, Minnesota, and Wisconsin.
