= Libor Capalini =

Czech modern pentathlete

Medal record

Men's modern pentathlon

Representing Czech Republic

Olympic Games
Bronze medal – third place	2004 Athens	Individual

World Championships
Silver medal – second place	2004 Moscow	Team
Silver medal – second place	2005 Warsaw	Team
Silver medal – second place	2007 Berlin	Team
Bronze medal – third place	2004 Moscow	Individual
Bronze medal – third place	2005 Warsaw	Relay
Bronze medal – third place	2006 Guatemala City	Team

Libor Capalini (born 30 January 1973 in Hořovice) is a modern pentathlete from the Czech Republic who won the bronze medal in the Modern Pentathlon at the 2004 Summer Olympics in Athens, Greece.
