= Tatsiana Mazurkevich =

Belarusian modern pentathlete

Personal information
- Nationality: Belarus
- Born: 7 September 1983 (age 42)
- Height: 1.67 m (5 ft 5 1/2 in)
- Weight: 54 kg (119 lb)

Sport
- Sport: Modern pentathlon
Medal record
Women's modern pentathlon
Representing Belarus
World Championships
Gold medal – first place	2007 Berlin	Team
Silver medal – second place	2004 Moscow	Team
Silver medal – second place	2004 Moscow	Relay
Bronze medal – third place	2004 Moscow	Individual

Tatsiana Mazurkevich (Belarusian: Таццяна Міхайлаўна Мазуркевіч Елізарава; Łacinka: Tacciana Michajłaŭna Mazurkievič Jelizarava; born September 7, 1983) is a Belarusian modern pentathlete. She competed at the 2004 Summer Olympics in Athens, Greece, where she finished ninth in the women's event, with a score of 5,220 points. Outside her Olympic career, Mazurkevich is also a multiple medalist at the World Modern Pentathlon Championships, winning four medals in overall.
