= Ákos Kállai =

Hungarian modern pentathlete

Personal information
- Nationality: Hungary
- Born: 29 March 1974 (age 52) Budapest, Hungary
- Height: 1.90 m (6 ft 3 in)
- Weight: 78 kg (172 lb)

Sport
- Sport: Modern pentathlon
- Club: Honvéd Steffl Sportegyesület
Medal record
Men's modern pentathlon
Representing Hungary
World Championships
Gold medal – first place	2005 Warsaw	Relay
Gold medal – first place	2006 Guatemala City	Relay
Silver medal – second place	2006 Guatemala City	Team

Ákos Kállai (born 29 March 1974, Budapest) is a modern pentathlete from Hungary. He competed at the 2004 Summer Olympics in Athens, where he finished eighteenth in the men's event, with a score of 5,132 points.

Kállai is a six-time world champion and seven-time European champion for the team and relay events in the men's modern pentathlon. He achieved his best result in 2003, when he won the championship title at the Steffi Cup, in his home turf.
