= Kate Allenby =

British modern pentathlete

Kate Allenby MBE
Personal information
- Full name: Katherine Fiona Allenby
- Born: 16 March 1974 (age 52) Tavistock, Devon, United Kingdom

Achievements and titles
- Olympic finals: 2004 Athens – Individual – 8th 2000 Sydney – Individual – bronze
Medal record
Women's modern pentathlon
Representing Great Britain
Olympic Games
| Bronze medal – third place | 2000 Sydney | Individual |
World Championships
| Gold medal – first place | 2001 Millfield | Team |
| Gold medal – first place | 2001 Millfield | Relay |
| Gold medal – first place | 2003 Pesaro | Team |
| Gold medal – first place | 2004 Moscow | Team |
| Silver medal – second place | 2004 Moscow | Individual |
| Bronze medal – third place | 1999 Budapest | Individual |
| Bronze medal – third place | 2003 Pesaro | Individual |
European Championships
| Gold medal – first place | 1997 Moscow | Individual |
| Bronze medal – third place | 1999 Tampere | Individual |
World Cup Final
| Gold medal – first place | 1998 Teplice | Individual |
| Gold medal – first place | 2004 Darmstadt | Individual |
Junior World Championships
| Silver medal – second place | 1995 | Individual |
| Bronze medal – third place | 1994 | Individual |

Katherine Fiona “Kate” Allenby MBE (born 16 March 1974) is a British modern pentathlete who competed in two Summer Olympics, taking the bronze medal at the 2000 Games and placing in 8th place in 2004. She has won medals at four World Championships, and after retiring from sport, she became a physical education teacher in Bath, England.

== Early life ==
She was born in Tavistock, Devon, but lived in Australia during her childhood. Her father ran three London Marathons and played field hockey at the county level.

Allenby joined The Pony Club and began to compete in tetrathlon, which features all the same events as the modern pentathlon except for the fencing event. Her original inspiration for getting involved in athletics came from Sebastian Coe's victory in the men's 1500 metres at the 1980 Summer Olympics, and she dreamt of competing at the Olympics.

== Career ==
She switched from tetrathlon to modern pentathlon at the age of sixteen after her father suggested she tried fencing. She won the bronze medal at the 1994 Junior World Championship, going one place better during the following year taking the silver medal. Although she initially trained part-time while working as a fitness consultant, she received National Lottery funding in 1997 enabling her to take up full-time training.

In the same year, she claimed her first senior major victory, with individual gold at the European Championships in Moscow. It was the first time in 15 years a British woman had won a major championship title. Allenby then confirmed her status as one of the leading women in her sport by winning her second major title in 1998 at the World Cup Final.

Whilst ranked as the world number three in her sport in 1999, she won the sporting section of the Cosmopolitan Woman of the Year Awards.

Competing for the British team at the 2000 Summer Olympics in Sydney, Allenby won a bronze medal in modern pentathlon with team-mate Steph Cook taking the gold. She decided to continue competing in order to represent Britain once more at the 2004 Summer Olympics.

In 2001, she was part of the British Women's Team that achieved the unique feat of a clean sweep of gold medals in the sport's major championships. Injury saw her miss the 2002 season but she returned to competition in time for the 2003 World Championships in Pesaro, Italy, where she won individual bronze, adding the individual silver medal at the following year's World Championships in Moscow.

At the 2004 Games in Athens she finished eighth in the Modern pentathlon competition. Having been in second place during the swimming event, an unfit horse saw her drop down in the rankings in the show jumping phase. After the final event, the 3000 metres, she congratulated her team-mate Georgina Harland who staged a comeback to take the bronze medal.

Allenby ended her modern pentathlon career by winning her second World Cup Final title in Darmstadt, in her final competition. After retirement she continued to compete in fencing, becoming British champion in 2005. She retired completely from professional sport prior to the 2008 Summer Olympics. In 2009, she was one of a number of athletes to travel to Iraq to take place in a conference in the Kurdistan Autonomous Region in the hopes of kickstarting the sports policy in the area. She has continued to be involved with modern pentathlon.

When London became the host city for the 2012 Summer Olympics, Allenby was chosen to be the director of the fencing discipline for the modern pentathlon event at the Games. The fence element of ModPen was held at the "Copper Box" at Olympic Park, before handing over to the swim element at the Aquatics Centre, and then on to Greenwich Park for the ride, and combined run and shoot and finally the medals ceremony.

== Personal life ==
While competing, she studied for a master's degree in Philosophy at the University of Surrey. After retiring from elite sport she retrained as a teacher and is currently teaching physical education at Paragon Junior School in Bath. She also is on the inspirational speakers circuit.

She was awarded an MBE for services to sport in the 2008 New Year Honours List. In 1997 she was voted onto the British Olympic Association athletes commission and became the first chair of the new British Athletes Commission in 2003. She returned to the BOA Athletes Commission in the run up to the 2012 London Olympics and the Association nominated her to carry the Olympic torch in 2012; she carried it through Bath as part of the torch relay.

She lives in Limpley Stoke, Wiltshire.
