= Kim Raisner =

German modern pentathlete

Personal information
- Nationality: Germany
- Born: 30 December 1972 (age 53) West Berlin, West Germany
- Height: 1.71 m (5 ft 7 1/2 in)
- Weight: 63 kg (139 lb)

Sport
- Sport: Modern pentathlon
- Club: Wasserfreunde Spandau 04 (GER)
- Now coaching: Lena Schöneborn
Medal record
Women's modern pentathlon
Representing Germany
World Championships
| Gold medal – first place | 2005 Warsaw | Relay |

Kim Raisner (born 30 December 1972) is a retired modern pentathlete from Germany and current German modern pentathlon coach. She competed at the 2004 Summer Olympics in Athens, Greece, where she finished fifth in the women's event with a score of 5,312 points. She won the bronze medal in the 1999 world modern pentathlon world championships.

== Coaching ==
Since retirement in 2005, Raisner has coached her national women's modern pentathlon team and worked as a physiotherapist. She was head coach to 2008 Summer Olympics champion Lena Schöneborn.

Raisner was disqualified from the 2020 Summer Olympics after punching a horse which refused to jump for German rider Annika Schleu. She also instructed Schleu herself to hit the horse, allegedly using the words "really hit it". The sport's governing body stated that it 'had reviewed video footage that showed Ms Raisner appearing to strike the horse Saint Boy. Raisner was later required to attend a coach education seminar that included a module on animal welfare and humane treatment.

After the incident, Raisner indicated that her response was proportional and that the outrage was overblown as whips and spurs were allowed saying, "Gerte und Sporen sind Hilfsmittel, die in der Reiterei erlaubt sind" ("Whip and spurs are aids that are permitted in horse riding"). The reaction to Schleu and Raisner's conduct at the Tokyo Olympics later figured in the UIPM's decision to remove horse riding from the discipline of modern pentathlon.

Despite her disqualification at the 2020 Olympics, Raisner returned to coach the German team in Paris at the 2024 Summer Olympics.
