= Tatiana Mouratova =

Russian modern pentathlete

Personal information
- Full name: Tatiana Sergeyevna Mouratova
- Nationality: Russia
- Born: 19 September 1979 (age 46) Moscow, Russia
- Height: 1.63 m (5 ft 4 in)
- Weight: 52 kg (115 lb)

Sport
- Sport: Modern pentathlon
- Club: Dynamo Moskva
Medal record
Women's modern pentathlon
Representing Russia
World Championships
Gold medal – first place	1999 Budapest	Team
Gold medal – first place	2005 Warsaw	Team
Silver medal – second place	1997 Moscow	Team
Silver medal – second place	2001 Millfield	Relay
Silver medal – second place	2003 Pesaro	Team
Silver medal – second place	2005 Warsaw	Relay
Bronze medal – third place	2001 Millfield	Team
Bronze medal – third place	2002 San Francisco	Team
Bronze medal – third place	2004 Moscow	Team
Bronze medal – third place	2006 Guatemala City	Relay
Bronze medal – third place	2007 Berlin	Team

Tatiana Sergeyevna Mouratova (Russian: Татьяна Серге́евна Муратова; born September 19, 1979, in Moscow) is a three-time Olympic modern pentathlete from Russia. She is also a multiple-time medalist at the World Championships, and a double champion at the Open National Championships in her home city, Moscow.

Mouratova achieved her best results, and consistently performed in the women's event at the Olympics, finishing thirteenth in 2000, twenty-seventh in 2004, and thirteenth in 2008.
