= Viktor Horváth =

Hungarian modern pentathlete

Personal information
- Nationality: Hungary
- Born: 26 February 1978 (age 48) Székesfehérvár, Hungary
- Height: 1.74 m (5 ft 8 1/2 in)
- Weight: 71 kg (157 lb)

Sport
- Sport: Modern pentathlon
- Club: Alba Volán
Medal record
Men's modern pentathlon
Representing Hungary
World Championships
Gold medal – first place	2005 Warsaw	Relay
Gold medal – first place	2006 Guatemala City	Relay
Gold medal – first place	2007 Berlin	Individual
Silver medal – second place	2006 Guatemala City	Team
Bronze medal – third place	2007 Berlin	Team

Viktor Horváth (born 26 February 1978, Székesfehérvár) is a modern pentathlete from Hungary. He competed at the 2008 Summer Olympics in Beijing, where he finished nineteenth in the men's event, with a score of 5,272 points.

Horváth also won individual gold medals at the 2007 European Senior Championships in Riga, Latvia, and at the 2007 World Modern Pentathlon Championships in Berlin, Germany.
