= Csilla Füri =

Hungarian modern pentathlete (born 1972)

Personal information
- Nationality: Hungary
- Born: 24 April 1972 (age 54) Budapest, Hungary
- Height: 1.60 m (5 ft 3 in)
- Weight: 55 kg (121 lb)

Sport
- Sport: Modern pentathlon
- Club: Honvéd Steffl Sportegyesület
- Coached by: Tamás Kancsal
Medal record
Women's modern pentathlon
Representing Hungary
World Championships
Gold medal – first place	2002 San Francisco	Team
Gold medal – first place	2003 Pesaro	Team
Silver medal – second place	1995 Basel	Team
Silver medal – second place	2005 Warsaw	Team
Bronze medal – third place	2006 Guatemala City	Team

Csilla Füri (born 24 April 1972) is a retired modern pentathlete from Hungary. She competed at the 2004 Summer Olympics in Athens, Greece, where she finished eleventh in the women's event with a score of 5,144 points.

Füri is a two-time national modern pentathlon champion, and also led her team to win multiple medals at the World Modern Pentathlon Championships, including two golds (2002 in San Francisco, California, U.S., and 2003 in Pesaro, Italy).
