= Claudia Corsini =

Italian modern pentathlete (born 1977)

Personal information
- Nationality: Italy
- Born: 24 December 1977 (age 48) Rome, Italy
- Height: 1.65 m (5 ft 5 in)
- Weight: 59 kg (130 lb)

Sport
- Sport: Modern pentathlon
- Club: SS Kronos
Medal record
Women's modern pentathlon
Representing Italy
World Championships
Gold medal – first place	2005 Warsaw	Individual
Silver medal – second place	2002 San Francisco	Team
Bronze medal – third place	2005 Warsaw	Relay

Claudia Corsini (born December 24, 1977, in Rome) is a two-time Olympic modern pentathlete from Italy. She won a silver medal for the team at the 2002 World Modern Pentathlon Championships in San Francisco, California, and an individual gold at the 2005 World Modern Pentathlon Championships in Warsaw, Poland.

At the 2004 Summer Olympics, Corsini missed out the podium in the women's event, when she finished fourth in the overall results, with a score of 5,324 points. She aimed higher chances of winning an Olympic medal at her second games in Beijing, but her poor performance in the fencing segment landed her to fourteenth place. Shortly after the Olympics, Corsini eventually retired from her sporting career.

== Biography ==
In 2004, she participated in the Athens Olympics, finishing in 4th place. In 2005, she became the new world champion in modern pentathlon, the first Italian to win this title. In the past, Italy had won medals, but never individually.The Italian athlete secured victory right from the first event, winning the shooting competition. She then went on to perform well in fencing, swimming, and horse riding. In the running event, she left all her rivals behind, scoring a total of 5,672 points. In 2006, she won her fifth Italian title as a representative of the Fiamme Azzurre, accumulating 5,552 points, 88 points ahead of Alessia Pieretti. The following year, she won gold in the team event at the European Championships in Riga, alongside Pieretti and Sara Bertoli. She tried again at the Beijing Olympics, but this time she finished well behind the leaders, coming in 14th place.
