= Eric Walther =

German modern pentathlete

Personal information
- Nationality: Germany
- Born: 13 March 1975 (age 51) East Berlin, East Germany
- Height: 1.80 m (5 ft 11 in)
- Weight: 72 kg (159 lb)

Sport
- Sport: Modern pentathlon
- Club: PSV Berlin (GER)
Medal record
Men's modern pentathlon
Representing Germany
World Championships
Gold medal – first place	2002 San Francisco	Relay
Gold medal – first place	2003 Pesaro	Individual
Gold medal – first place	2007 Berlin	Team
Gold medal – first place	2007 Berlin	Relay
Bronze medal – third place	2002 San Francisco	Individual
Bronze medal – third place	2005 Warsaw	Team

Eric Walther (born 13 March 1975 in East Berlin) is a three-time Olympic modern pentathlete from Germany. He is a two-time world champion for the relay events, and also, won an individual gold medal at the 2003 World Modern Pentathlon Championships in Pesaro, Italy.

Walther had achieved his best result in an Olympic level, when he competed at the 2004 Summer Olympics in Athens, and finished seventh for the men's event, with a score of 5,320 points.
