= Steph Cook =

British modern pentathlete

Steph Cook MBE
Personal information
- Full name: Stephanie Jayne Cook
- Nationality: British
- Born: 7 February 1972 (age 54) Irvine, North Ayrshire, Scotland
- Education: Peterhouse, Cambridge; Lincoln College, Oxford
Medal record
Women's modern pentathlon
Representing Great Britain
Olympic Games
Gold medal – first place	2000 Sydney	Individual

Stephanie Jayne Cook, MBE (born 7 February 1972) is a British retired modern pentathlete. She was the Olympic champion at this event in 2000.

Cook was born in Irvine, North Ayrshire, Scotland. She was educated at Bedford High School; The Perse School for Girls; Peterhouse, Cambridge and then Lincoln College, Oxford, where she read medicine.

As an undergraduate at Cambridge, Cook won a Half-Blue for rowing in the 1993 Women's Lightweight Boat Race. She was forced to give up the sport due to a series of stress fractures in a rib.

Cook took up modern pentathlon whilst completing her course in clinical medicine at Oxford. She was president of the Oxford University Modern Pentathlon Association in 1995–1996, and won the women's individual title in the Varsity match against Cambridge in 1997.

Although reported as "having put her medical career on hold", she was supported through her training from 1998 to 2000 by consultant surgeon Mark Whiteley who funded a research job for her in Guildford, during which she published three papers with him. She paid him tribute in 2002 during the TV programme This is Your Life.

Cook won the gold medal in the Sydney 2000 Olympics in the women's modern pentathlon, the first time that the event was included in the games. She went on to win individual World and European titles in 2001 before retiring from the sport. Her particular strength was running.

== Honours ==
In the 2001 New Year Honours, Cook was appointed as a member of the Order of The British Empire for services to modern pentathlon. In 2008, she was awarded an honorary degree (Doctor of Medicine) from the University of Bath.
