= Modern pentathlon at the 2012 Summer Olympics – Men's =

Men's modern pentathlon at the Games of the XXX Olympiad
- Venue: Copper Box (fencing); Aquatics Centre (swimming); Greenwich Park (riding and combined)
- Date: 11 August
- Competitors: 36 from 24 nations
- Winning score: 5928 OR

Medalists
1st place, gold medalist(s)		David Svoboda	Czech Republic
2nd place, silver medalist(s)		Cao Zhongrong	China
3rd place, bronze medalist(s)		Ádám Marosi	Hungary

The men's modern pentathlon at the 2012 Summer Olympics in London was held on 11 August. Three venues were used: the Copper Box (fencing), Aquatics Centre (swimming) and Greenwich Park (horse-riding and combined running and shooting).

David Svoboda from the Czech Republic won the gold medal with an Olympic record-breaking score of 5,926 points. Cao Zhongrong, 2010 Asian Games gold medalist, won China's first ever Olympic medal in modern pentathlon, taking the silver. Meanwhile, Hungary's Ádám Marosi claimed the bronze medal. For the first time in the post-Soviet era, Russia missed out of the medal podium in the men's event, as current world champion Aleksander Lesun and defending champion Andrey Moiseev finished fourth and seventh place, respectively.

== Competition format ==
The modern pentathlon consisted of five events, with all five held in one day. The format was slightly different from the typical modern pentathlon, with two events combined at the end.

- Fencing: A round-robin, one-touch épée competition. Score was based on winning percentage.
- Swimming: A 200 m freestyle race. Score was based on time.
- Horse-riding: A show jumping competition. Score based on penalties for fallen bars, refusals, falls, and being over the time limit.
- Combined running/shooting: A 3 km run with pistol shooting (the athlete must hit five targets in 70 seconds) every 1 km. Starts are staggered (based on points from first three events) so that the first to cross the finish line wins.

== Schedule ==
All times are British Summer Time (UTC+1)

Date	Time	Round
Saturday, 11 August 2012	08:45	Fencing
Saturday, 11 August 2012	13:20	Swimming
Saturday, 11 August 2012	15:20	Riding
Saturday, 11 August 2012	19:00	Combined running/shooting

== Results ==
Thirty-six athletes participated.

Rank	Athlete	Country	Fencing Victories (pts)	Swimming Time (pts)	Riding Time (pts)	Combined Time (pts)	Total
1st place, gold medalist(s)	David Svoboda	Czech Republic	26 (1024)	2:04.84 (1304)	77.28 (1132)	10:33.02 (2468)	5928 (OR)
2nd place, silver medalist(s)	Cao Zhongrong	China	25 (1000)	1:58.93 (1376)	74.62 (1080)	10:38.02 (2448)	5904
3rd place, bronze medalist(s)	Ádám Marosi	Hungary	20 (880)	2:02.08 (1336)	75.94 (1200)	10:45.72 (2420)	5836
4	Aleksander Lesun	Russia	25 (1000)	2:04.29 (1312)	77.61 (1112)	11:05.83 (2340)	5764
5	Steffen Gebhardt	Germany	20 (880)	2:07.08 (1276)	72.11 (1160)	10:37.16 (2452)	5756
6	Thomas Daniel	Austria	17 (808)	2:09.23 (1252)	73.56 (1180)	10:24.02 (2504)	5744
7	Andrey Moiseev	Russia	22 (928)	2:02.71 (1328)	70.65 (1140)	11:05.28 (2340)	5736
8	Justinas Kinderis	Lithuania	15 (760)	2:04.35 (1308)	72.78 (1140)	10:19.34 (2524)	5732
9	Riccardo De Luca	Italy	16 (784)	2:08.29 (1264)	72.09 (1200)	10:32.34 (2472)	5720
10	Nicholas Woodbridge	Great Britain	17 (808)	1:57.32 (1396)	81.22 (1156)	11:01.66 (2356)	5716
11	Jung Jin-Hwa	South Korea	16 (784)	2:00.25 (1360)	70.01 (1160)	10:57.17 (2372)	5676
12	Róbert Kasza	Hungary	20 (880)	2:01.59 (1344)	74.57 (1200)	11:27.85 (2252)	5676
13	Samuel Weale	Great Britain	17 (808)	2:03.40 (1320)	76.68 (1176)	11:00.00 (2360)	5664
14	Óscar Soto	Mexico	16 (784)	2:10.98 (1232)	76.38 (1176)	10:34.42 (2464)	5656
15	Ondřej Polívka	Czech Republic	12 (688)	2:02.71 (1328)	76.14 (1136)	10:25.99 (2500)	5652
16	Stanislau Zhurauliou	Belarus	20 (880)	2:06.80 (1280)	70.07 (1120)	10:58.10 (2368)	5648
17	Christopher Patte	France	16 (784)	2:05.99 (1292)	76.38 (1116)	10:43.96 (2428)	5620
18	Esteban Bustos	Chile	15 (760)	2:10.52 (1236)	68.58 (1160)	10:38.72 (2448)	5604
19	Deniss Čerkovskis	Latvia	23 (952)	2:10.78 (1232)	91.78 (976)	10:46.88 (2416)	5576
20	Nicola Benedetti	Italy	17 (808)	2:18.47 (1140)	84.16 (1084)	10:16.92 (2536)	5568
21	Rustem Sabizkhuzin	Kazakhstan	19 (856)	2:13.21 (1204)	72.42 (1100)	10:49.57 (2404)	5564
22	Shinichi Tomii	Japan	18 (832)	2:01.19 (1348)	88.57 (1088)	11:19.13 (2284)	5552
23	Pavlo Tymoshchenko	Ukraine	13 (712)	2:08.15 (1264)	69.63 (1140)	10:48.37 (2408)	5524
24	Szymon Staśkiewicz	Poland	14 (736)	2:11.54 (1224)	75.21 (1180)	10:56.31 (2376)	5516
25	Arthur Lanigan O'Keeffe	Ireland	14 (736)	2:02.44 (1332)	85.13 (1120)	11:08.69 (2328)	5516
26	Stefan Köllner	Germany	16 (784)	2:11.71 (1220)	70.47 (1120)	10:59.16 (2364)	5488
27	Edward Fernon	Australia	14 (736)	2:13.10 (1204)	87.40 (1152)	10:48.19 (2408)	5480
28	Yasser Hefny	Egypt	17 (808)	2:05.90 (1292)	80.39 (1080)	11:25.53 (2260)	5440
29	Pavel Iliashenko	Kazakhstan	15 (760)	2:06.62 (1244)	96.94 (1036)	10:49.80 (2404)	5432
30	Dzmitry Meliakh	Belarus	17 (808)	2:03.67 (1316)	78.50 (1028)	11:33.18 (2228)	5380
31	Andrei Gheorghe	Guatemala	15 (760)	2:13.89 (1196)	77.04 (1112)	11:15.58 (2300)	5368
32	Dennis Bowsher	United States	12 (688)	2:05.15 (1300)	81.36 (1076)	10:25.09 (2260)	5324
33	Amro El-Geziry	Egypt	18 (832)	1:55.70 (1412)	111.42 (856)	11:42.44 (2192)	5292
34	Hwang Woo-Jin	South Korea	14 (736)	2:01.14 (1348)	146.83 (736)	12:08.88 (2088)	4908
35	Dmytro Kirpulyanskyy	Ukraine	17 (808)	2:04.83 (1304)	DNF (580)	11:18.80 (2288)	4740
36	Wang Guan	China	12 (688)	2:12.13 (1216)	DNS (0)	DNS (0)	1904

== Records ==
For the first time in Olympic history, the men's modern pentathlon has broken multiple Olympic records in the every sporting discipline, with the exception of horse-riding.

Broken Olympic records during the 2012 Summer Olympics
Total	David Svoboda (CZE)	5928
Fencing	David Svoboda (CZE)	=26V–9D
Swimming	Amro El Geziry (EGY)	1:55.70
Running	Nicola Benedetti (ITA)	9:23.63 (WR)
Combined	Nicola Benedetti (ITA)	10:16.92
Shooting - 1 session of 5 shots	Ondřej Polívka (CZE)	9.3
Shooting - 3 session of 15 shots	Ondřej Polívka (CZE)	33.6
