= Czech Republic at the 2012 Summer Olympics =

- IOC code: CZE
- NOC: Czech Olympic Committee
- Website: www.olympic.cz (in Czech and English)

in London
- Competitors: 133 in 19 sports
- Flag bearers: Petr Koukal (opening); Barbora Špotáková (closing)
- Medals Ranked 19th: Gold 4 Silver 4 Bronze 3 Total 11

Summer Olympics appearances (overview)
- 1996; 2000; 2004; 2008; 2012; 2016; 2020; 2024; 2028

Other related appearances
- Bohemia (1900–1912); Czechoslovakia (1924–1992)

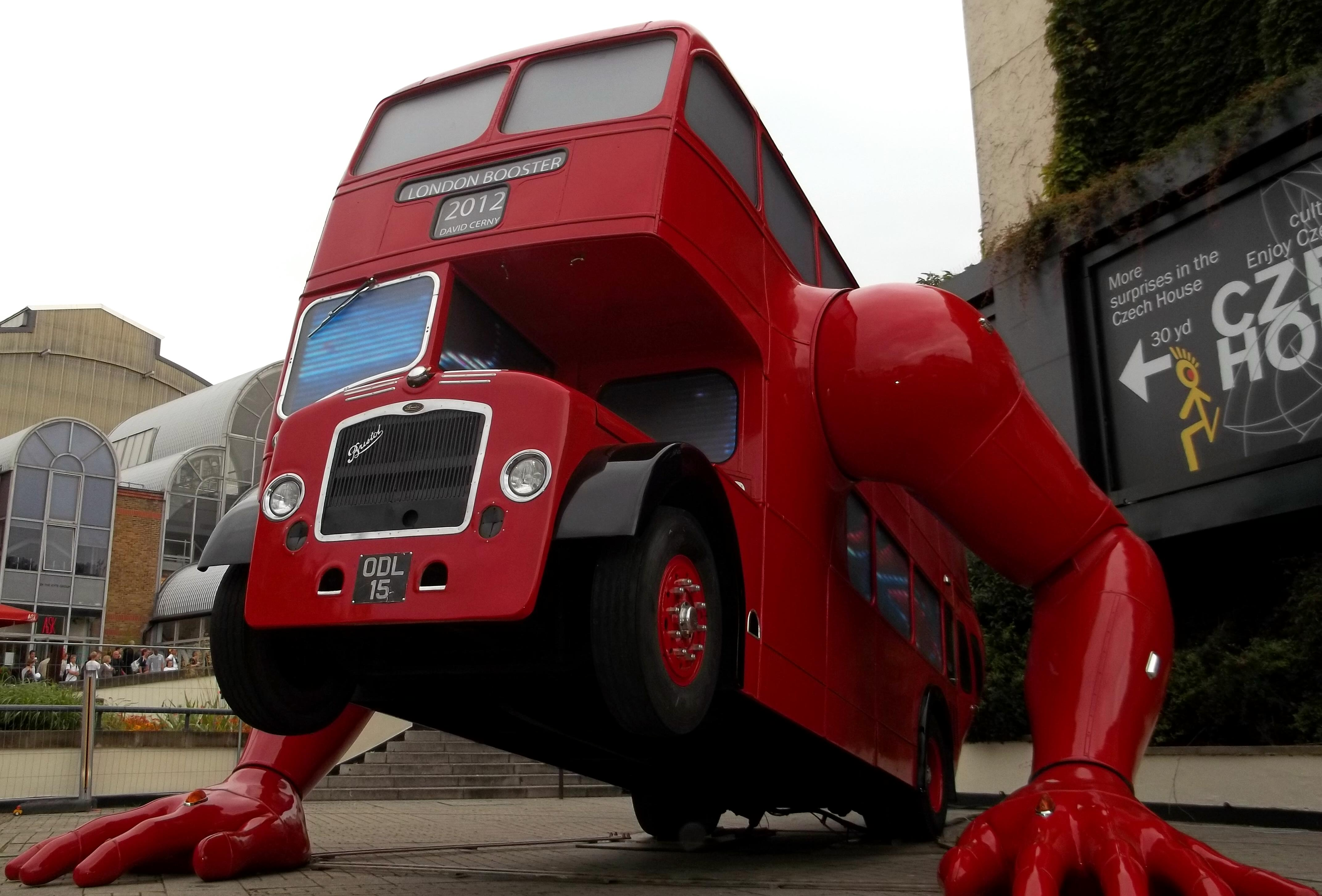
The London Booster, a moving sculpture outside Czech House

Czech Republic competed at the 2012 Summer Olympics in London, United Kingdom, from 27 July to 12 August 2012. This was the nation's fifth appearance at the Summer Olympics after gaining its independence from the former Czechoslovakia. The Czech Olympic Committee sent a total of 133 athletes to the Games, 68 men and 65 women, to compete in 19 sports.

Czech Republic left London with a total of 11 medals (4 gold, 3 silver, and 4 bronze), the same total achieved in Atlanta. This was in stark contrast with the zero medal tally of the neighbouring Austria, a nation of roughly comparable size. Finishing the nineteenth position in the medal standings was the second best performance for the Czech Republic in the post-Czechoslovak era.

Among the nation's medalists were Barbora Špotáková, who successfully defended her Olympic title in women's javelin throw, and rower Ondřej Synek, who managed to repeat his silver medal in men's single sculls. Three Czech athletes won Olympic gold medals for the first time in history: single sculls rower Miroslava Knapková, modern pentathlete David Svoboda, and mountain biker Jaroslav Kulhavý. Several Czech athletes, however, missed out of medal standings in the finals, including rifle shooter and defending champion Kateřina Emmons, and javelin thrower Vítězslav Veselý.

For the first time in its history, the Czech House (located in the Business Design Centre in borough of Islington) had become accessible to the public (i.e. not only the team members and VIPs), attracting over 78,000 visitors during the Olympics. In a brief comparison of selected national centres, AP news agency even awarded this project an imaginary "gold medal". A moving sculpture by David Černý named London Booster (a life-sized London double-decker bus doing push-ups with humanoid arms) was a major feature outside the Czech House. Meanwhile, Czech presentation relied heavily on eccentricity. For example, the official outfit, in which Czech athletes paraded during the opening ceremonies (and some also entered podiums), featured bright blue Wellington boots (a joke on the stereotypically unstable British weather).

== Medalists ==
Medal	Name	Sport	Event	Date
Gold	Miroslava Knapková	Rowing	Women's single sculls	4 August
Gold	Barbora Špotáková	Athletics	Women's javelin throw	9 August
Gold	David Svoboda	Modern pentathlon	Men's event	11 August
Gold	Jaroslav Kulhavý	Cycling	Men's cross-country	12 August
Silver	Vavřinec Hradilek	Canoeing	Men's slalom K-1	1 August
Silver	Ondřej Synek	Rowing	Men's single sculls	3 August
Silver	Andrea Hlaváčková; Lucie Hradecká	Tennis	Women's doubles	5 August
Silver	Zuzana Hejnová	Athletics	Women's 400 m hurdles	8 August
Bronze	Adéla Sýkorová	Shooting	Women's 50 m rifle 3 positions	4 August
Bronze	Josef Dostál; Daniel Havel; Jan Štěrba; Lukáš Trefil	Canoeing	Men's K-4 1000 m	9 August
Bronze	Vítězslav Veselý	Athletics	Men's javelin throw	11 August

Medals by sport
Sport	1st place, gold medalist(s)	2nd place, silver medalist(s)	3rd place, bronze medalist(s)	Total
Athletics	1	1	1	3
Canoeing	0	1	1	2
Cycling	1	0	0	1
Modern pentathlon	1	0	0	1
Rowing	1	1	0	2
Shooting	0	0	1	1
Tennis	0	1	0	1
Total	4	4	3	11

Medals by date
Day	Date	1st place, gold medalist(s)	2nd place, silver medalist(s)	3rd place, bronze medalist(s)	Total
5	August 1	0	1	0	1
7	August 3	0	1	0	1
8	August 4	1	0	1	2
9	August 5	0	1	0	1
12	August 8	0	1	0	1
13	August 9	1	0	1	2
15	August 11	1	0	1	2
16	August 12	1	0	0	1
Total		4	4	3	11

Medals by gender
Gender	1st place, gold medalist(s)	2nd place, silver medalist(s)	3rd place, bronze medalist(s)	Total	Percentage
Male	2	2	2	6	54.54%
Female	2	2	1	5	45.45%
Mixed	0	0	0	0	0.00%
Total	4	4	3	3	100%

Multiple medalists
Name	Sport	1st place, gold medalist(s)	2nd place, silver medalist(s)	3rd place, bronze medalist(s)	Total
—N/a	—N/a	0	0	0	0

== Competitors ==
The Czech Olympic Committee selected a team of 133 athletes, 68 men and 65 women, to compete in 19 sports; this was the nation's second-largest team sent to the Olympics, tying the record (one athlete and two sports less) set by Beijing. Women's basketball was the only team-based sport in which the Czech Republic had its representation in these Olympic Games. There was only a single competitor in boxing, trampoline gymnastics, weightlifting, and wrestling.

The Czech team included five past Olympic champions, three of them defending (rifle shooter Kateřina Emmons, trap shooter David Kostelecký, and javelin thrower Barbora Špotáková). Finn sailor Michael Maier, at age 48, was the oldest athlete of the team, while swimmer Jan Micka was the youngest at age 17. Slalom canoer and double gold medalist Štěpánka Hilgertová, who had participated at every Olympic games since 1992, made her sixth appearance as the most experienced athlete.

Other notable Czech athletes featured decathlete and former Olympic champion Roman Šebrle, mountain biker Kateřina Nash, who competed at both Summer and Winter Olympic games, javelin thrower and defending world champion Vítězslav Veselý, and high jumper and former bronze medalist Jaroslav Bába. Badminton player and cancer survivor Petr Koukal was the nation's flag bearer at the opening ceremony.

The following is the list of number of competitors participating in the Games:

Sport	Men	Women	Total
Athletics	14	17	31
Badminton	1	1	2
Basketball	0	12	12
Boxing	1	0	1
Canoeing	10	1	11
Cycling	7	3	10
Gymnastics	1	2	3
Judo	3	0	3
Modern pentathlon	2	1	3
Rowing	9	3	12
Sailing	3	1	4
Shooting	7	3	10
Swimming	2	5	7
Synchronized swimming	0	2	2
Table tennis	0	2	2
Tennis	2	6	8
Triathlon	2	2	4
Volleyball	2	4	6
Weightlifting	1	0	1
Wrestling	1	0	1
Total	68	65	133

== Athletics ==
Czech athletes have so far achieved qualifying standards in the following athletics events (up to a maximum of 3 athletes in each event at the 'A' Standard, and 1 at the 'B' Standard):

Key

- Note – Ranks given for track events are within the athlete's heat only
- Q = Qualified for the next round
- q = Qualified for the next round as a fastest loser or, in field events, by position without achieving the qualifying target
- NR = National record
- N/A = Round not applicable for the event
- Bye = Athlete not required to compete in round

Men
Track & road events

Athlete	Event	Heat		Semifinal		Final	
Athlete	Event	Result	Rank	Result	Rank	Result	Rank
Pavel Maslák	200 m	20.67	4	Did not advance			
Pavel Maslák	400 m	44.91	2 Q	45.15	5	Did not advance	
Jakub Holuša	800 m	1:46.87	4	Did not advance			
Josef Prorok	400 m hurdles	50.33	7	Did not advance			
Jan Kreisinger	Marathon	—N/a				2:25:03	67

Field events

Athlete	Event	Qualification		Final	
Athlete	Event	Distance	Position	Distance	Position
Roman Novotný	Long jump	6.96	38	Did not advance	
Štěpán Wagner	Long jump	7.50	30	Did not advance	
Jaroslav Bába	High jump	2.21	21	Did not advance	
Jan Kudlička	Pole vault	5.50	=9 q	5.65	8
Antonín Žalský	Shot put	19.62	23	Did not advance	
Petr Frydrych	Javelin throw	75.46	34	Did not advance	
Jakub Vadlejch	Javelin throw	77.61	25	Did not advance	
Vítězslav Veselý	Javelin throw	88.34	1 Q	83.34	3rd place, bronze medalist(s)
Lukáš Melich	Hammer throw	75.88	9 q	77.17	6

Combined events – Decathlon

Athlete	Event	100 m	LJ	SP	HJ	400 m	110H	DT	PV	JT	1500 m	Final	Rank
Roman Šebrle	Result	11.54	DNS	—	—	—	—	—	—	—	—	DNF	
Roman Šebrle	Points	744	0	—	—	—	—	—	—	—	—	DNF	

Women
Track & road events

Athlete	Event	Heat		Quarterfinal		Semifinal		Final	
Athlete	Event	Result	Rank	Result	Rank	Result	Rank	Result	Rank
Kateřina Čechová	100 m	Bye		11.43	5	Did not advance			
Lenka Masná	800 m	2:08.68	5	—N/a		Did not advance			
Tereza Čapková	1500 m	4:12.15	12	—N/a		Did not advance			
Lucie Škrobáková	100 m hurdles	13.01	3 Q	—N/a		12.81	5	Did not advance	
Zuzana Hejnová	400 m hurdles	53.96	1 Q	—N/a		53.62	2 Q	53.38 SB	2nd place, silver medalist(s)
Denisa Rosolová	400 m hurdles	55.42	5 q	—N/a		54.87	3 q	55.27	7
Jitka Bartoničková; Zuzana Bergrová; Tereza Čapková; Zuzana Hejnová; Lenka Masná; Denisa Rosolová	4 × 400 m relay	3:26.20	4 q	—N/a				3:27.77	7
Lucie Pelantová	20 km walk	—N/a						1:33:35	35
Ivana Sekyrová	Marathon	—N/a						2:37:14	67

Field events

Athlete	Event	Qualification		Final	
Athlete	Event	Distance	Position	Distance	Position
Oldřiška Marešová	High jump	1.80	29	Did not advance	
Jiřina Ptáčníková	Pole vault	4.55	12 q	4.45	6
Věra Cechlová	Discus throw	55.00	34	Did not advance	
Jarmila Klimešová	Javelin throw	59.90	14	Did not advance	
Barbora Špotáková	Javelin throw	66.19	1 Q	69.55 SB	1st place, gold medalist(s)
Kateřina Šafránková	Hammer throw	66.16	31	Did not advance	

Combined events – Heptathlon

Athlete	Event	100H	HJ	SP	200 m	LJ	JT	800 m	Final	Rank
Eliška Klučinová	Result	14.01	1.80	12.93	25.00	6.13	45.65	2:16.08	6109	18
Eliška Klučinová	Points	977	978	723	887	890	776	878	6109	18

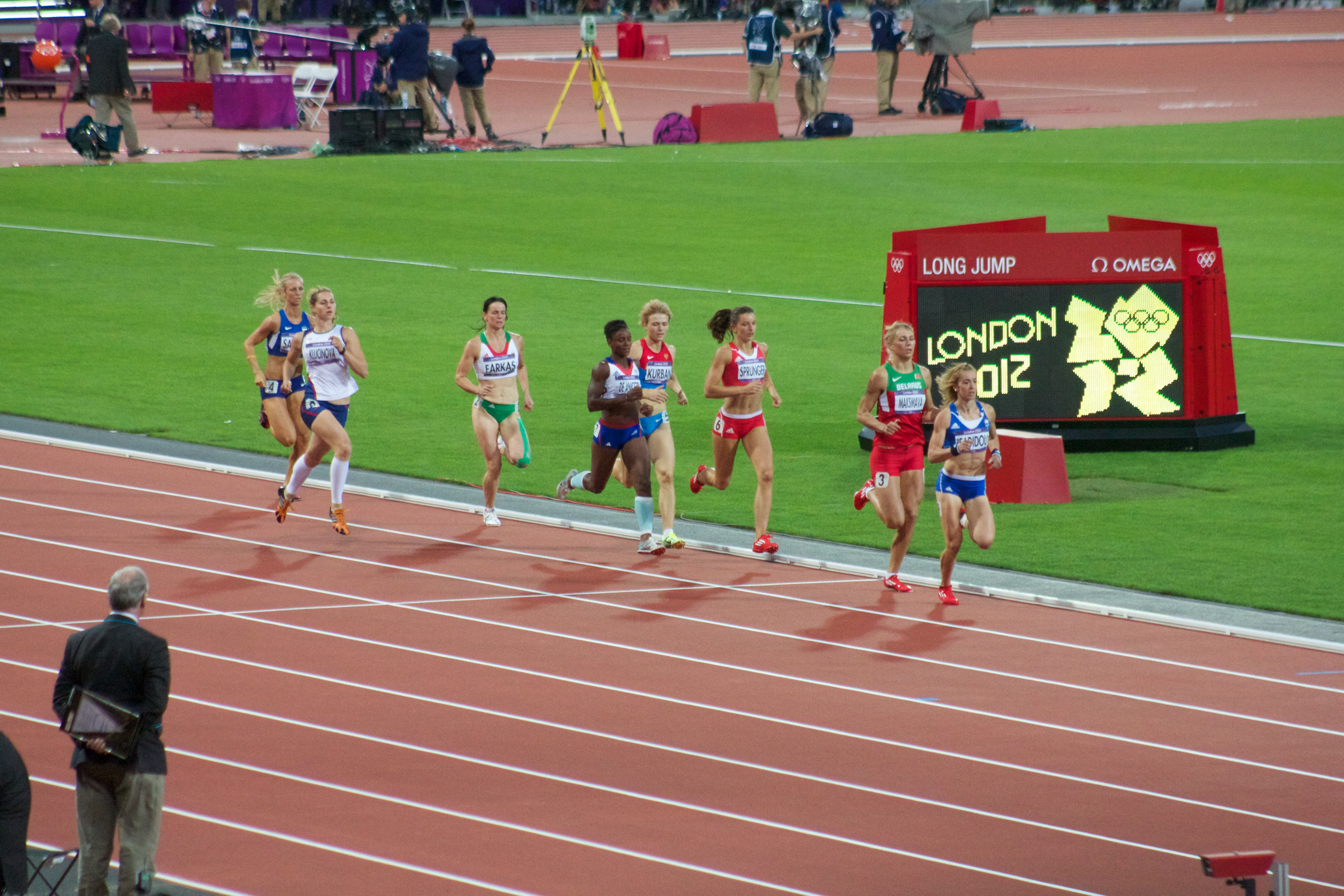
Eliška Klučinová (second from left) during the 800 m run in women's heptathlon

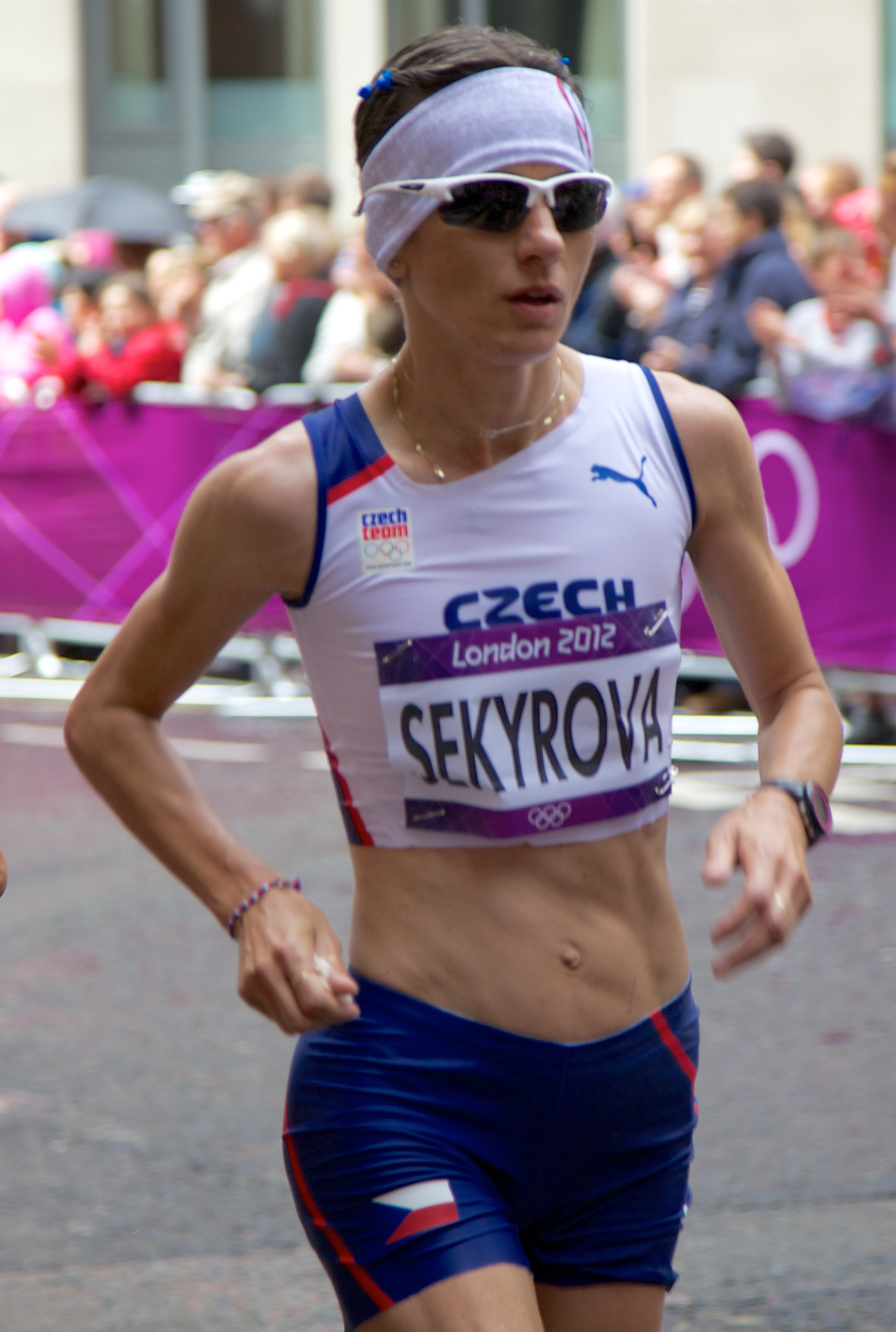
Ivana Sekyrová on course of the women's marathon

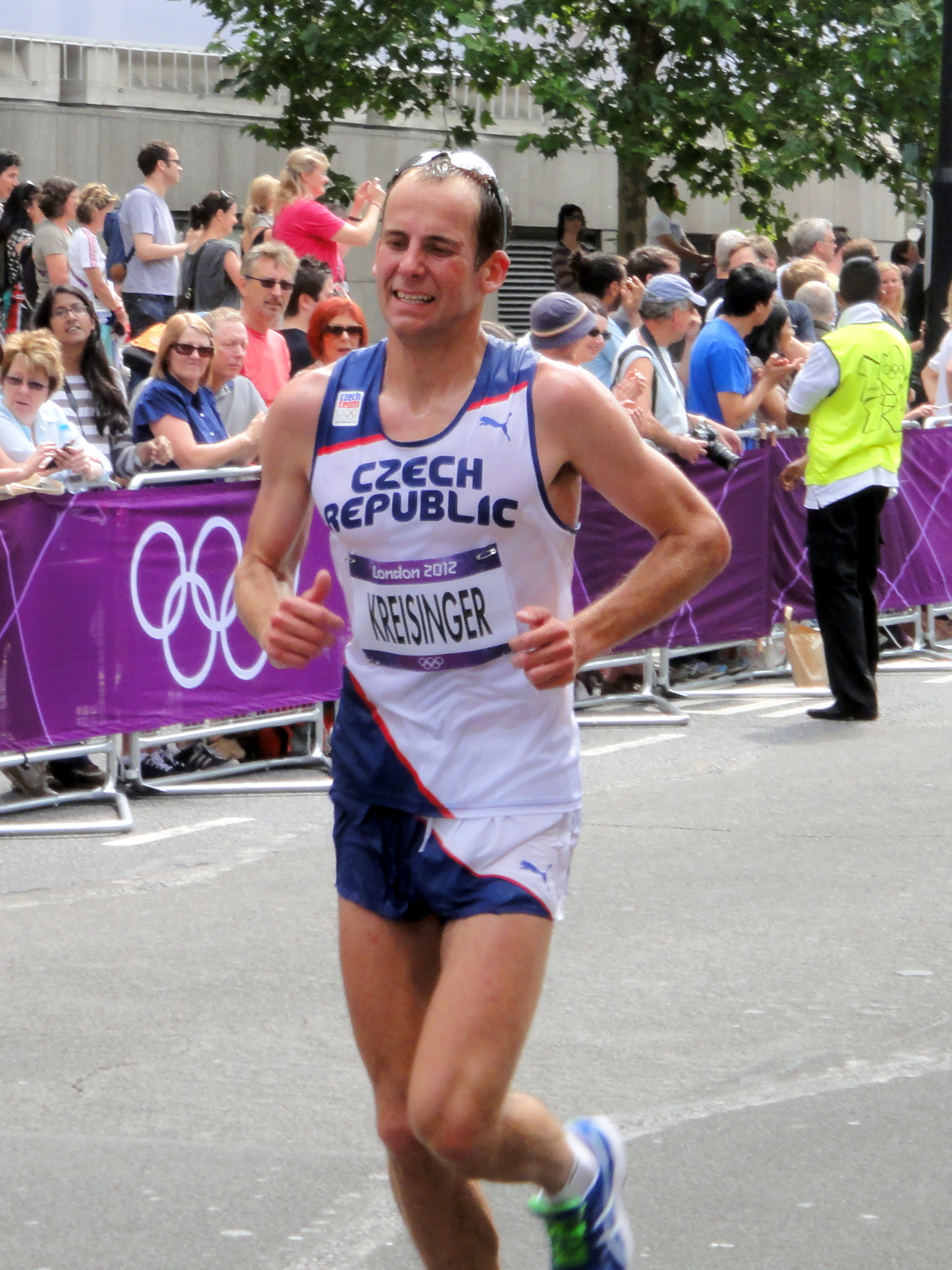
Jan Kreisinger on course of the men's marathon

== Badminton ==
Athlete	Event	Group stage			Round of 16	Quarterfinal	Semifinal	Final / BM	
Athlete	Event	Opposition Score	Opposition Score	Rank	Opposition Score	Opposition Score	Opposition Score	Opposition Score	Rank
Petr Koukal	Men's singles	Hidayat (INA); L 8–21, 8–21	Abián (ESP); L 17–21, 21–16, 16–21	3	Did not advance				
Kristína Gavnholt	Women's singles	Schenk (GER); L 18–21, 14–21	Griga (UKR); W 21–13, 15–21, 21–15	2	Did not advance				

== Basketball ==
Czech Republic has qualified a women's team.

- Women's team – 1 team of 12 players

=== Women's tournament ===
Roster

The following is the Czech Republic roster in the women's basketball tournament of the 2012 Summer Olympics.

Czech Republic women's national basketball team – 2012 Summer Olympics roster
Players
Coaches

Pos.	No.	Name	Age – Date of birth	Height	Club	Ctr.
F	4	Jana Veselá	28 – 31 December 1983	1.94 m (6 ft 4 in)	Homend Antakya	(Turkey)
F	5	Michaela Zrůstová	25 – 4 April 1987	1.86 m (6 ft 1 in)	Frisco SIKA Brno	(Czech Republic)
PG	6	Kateřina Bartoňová	22 – 17 January 1990	1.74 m (5 ft 9 in)	VS Prague	(Czech Republic)
SF	7	Kateřina Zohnová	27 – 7 November 1984	1.79 m (5 ft 10 in)	USO Mondeville	(France)
C	8	Ilona Burgrová	28 – 15 March 1984	1.95 m (6 ft 5 in)	ZVVZ USK Praha	(Czech Republic)
G	9	Hana Horáková	32 – 11 September 1979	1.79 m (5 ft 10 in)	UMMC Ekaterinburg	(Russia)
C	10	Alena Hanušová	21 – 29 May 1991	1.90 m (6 ft 3 in)	Frisco SIKA Brno	(Czech Republic)
SG	11	Kateřina Elhotová	22 – 14 October 1989	1.80 m (5 ft 11 in)	ZVVZ USK Praha	(Czech Republic)
G	12	Lenka Bartáková	21 – 17 May 1991	1.75 m (5 ft 9 in)	VS Prague	(Czech Republic)
C	13	Petra Kulichová	27 – 13 September 1984	1.98 m (6 ft 6 in)	Good Angels Košice	(Slovakia)
G	14	Tereza Pecková	25 – 10 July 1987	1.90 m (6 ft 3 in)	Frisco SIKA Brno	(Czech Republic)
F	15	Eva Vítečková	30 – 26 January 1982	1.90 m (6 ft 3 in)	ZVVZ USK Praha	(Czech Republic)

Head coach

- (Czech Republic) Lubor Blažek

Legend

- Club – describes last
  club before the tournament
- Age – describes age
  on 28 July 2012

Group play

Pos	Team	Pld	W	L	PF	PA	PD	Pts	Qualification
1	United States	5	5	0	462	279	+183	10	Quarterfinals
2	Turkey	5	4	1	343	316	+27	9	Quarterfinals
3	China	5	3	2	346	363	−17	8	Quarterfinals
4	Czech Republic	5	2	3	346	332	+14	7	Quarterfinals
5	Croatia	5	1	4	324	379	−55	6	
6	Angola	5	0	5	243	395	−152	5	

Source: FIBA archive
Rules for classification: 1) points; 2) head-to-head points; 3) head-to-head goal average; 4) head-to-head number of points scored.

28 July 2012
09:00

Report

China	66–57	Czech Republic
Scoring by quarter: 20–16, 16–13, 15–15, 15–13
Pts: Ma Zengyu 16; Rebs: Chen Nan 8 Asts: Miao Lijie 8		Pts: Vítečková 14; Rebs: Horáková 9 Asts: three players 3

Basketball Arena, London
Referees: Jorge Vazquez (PUR), Vaughan Mayberry (AUS), Carole Delaune (FRA)

30 July 2012
11:15

Report

Czech Republic	57–61	Turkey
Scoring by quarter: 8–13, 13–20, 18–12, 18–16
Pts: Veselá 19; Rebs: three players 6 Asts: Bartoňová, Elhotová 4		Pts: three players 11; Rebs: Yılmaz 13; Asts: Vardarlı 4

Basketball Arena, London
Referees: Pablo Estévez (ARG), Shoko Sugruro (JPN), Samir Abaakil (MAR)

1 August 2012
20:00

Report

Croatia	70–89	Czech Republic
Scoring by quarter: 19–22, 20–23, 21–12, 10–32
Pts: Mandir 20; Rebs: Mandir 6 Asts: Mandir 3		Pts: Elhotová 20; Rebs: Horáková 10; Asts: Veselá 7

Basketball Arena, London
Referees: Cristiano Maranho (BRA), Guerrino Cerebuch (ITA), Carole Delauné (FRA)

3 August 2012
22:15

Report

Czech Republic	61–88	United States
Scoring by quarter: 26–24, 12–24, 9–22, 14–18
Pts: Zrůstová 15; Rebs: Pecková 6 Asts: Bartoňová 3		Pts: Taurasi 18; Rebs: Charles 14; Asts: Bird 9

Basketball Arena, London
Referees: Elena Chernova (RUS), Marcos Benito (BRA), Vitalis Gode (KEN)

5 August 2012
11:15

Report

Angola	47–82	Czech Republic
Scoring by quarter: 18–23, 7–17, 10–18, 12–24
Pts: Mauricio 18; Rebs: Manuel 12; Asts: Eusébio, Guadalupe 2		Pts: Zrůstová 20; Rebs: Horáková 9 Asts: Elhotová 4

Basketball Arena, London
Referees: Rabah Noujaim (LIB), Vaughan Mayberry (AUS), Vitalis Gode (KEN)

Quarter-final

7 August 2012
22:15

Report

France	71–68	Czech Republic
Scoring by quarter: 16–12, 12–16, 13–23, 30–17
Pts: Dumerc 23; Rebs: Gruda 7 Asts: Dumerc 6		Pts: Vítečková 17; Rebs: Horáková 7 Asts: Horáková 5

Basketball Arena, London
Referees: Marcos Benito (BRA), Felicia Grinter (USA), Rabah Noujaim (LIB)

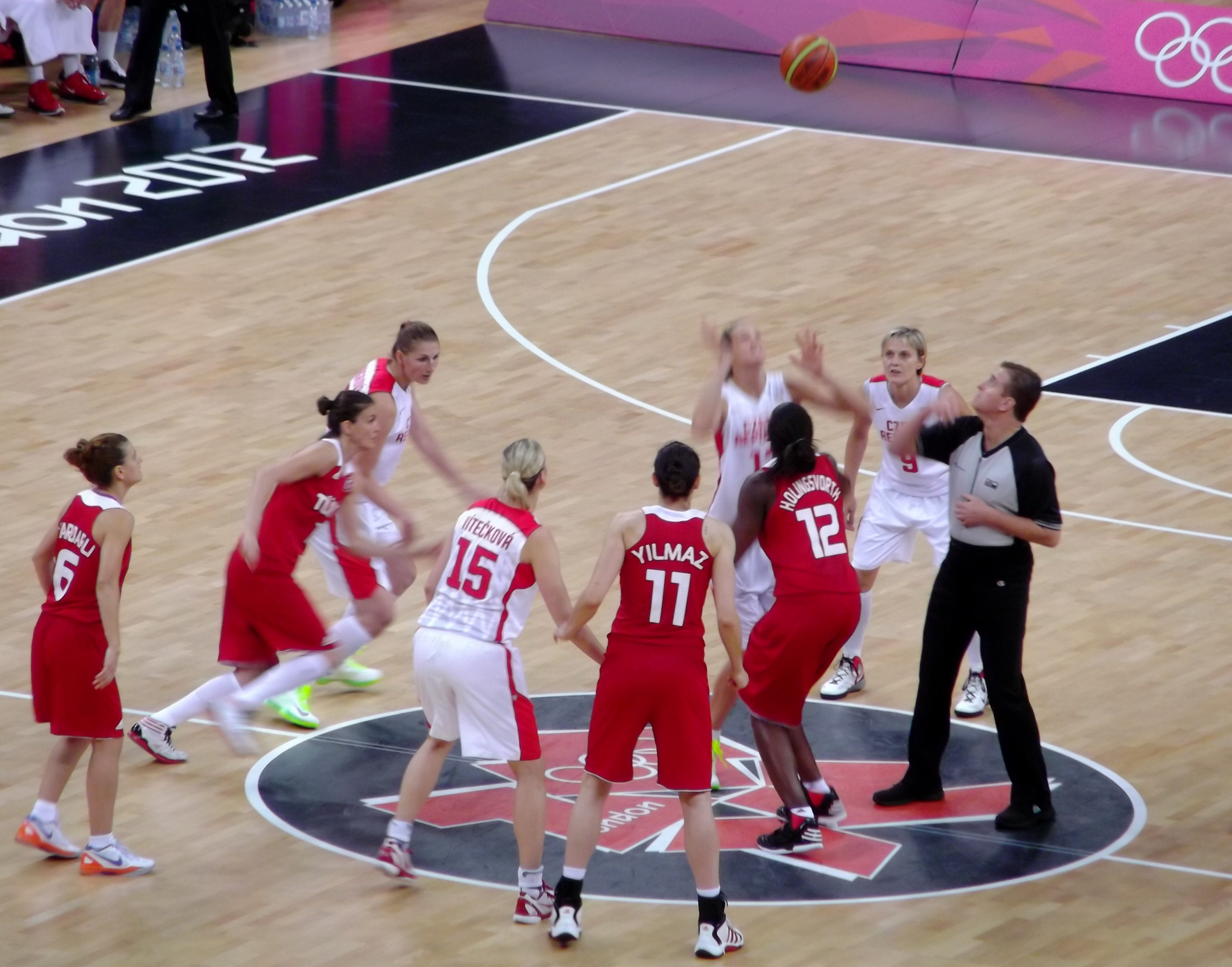
Czech Republic (in white) versus Turkey

== Boxing ==
Men

Athlete	Event	Round of 32	Round of 16	Quarterfinals	Semifinals	Final	
Athlete	Event	Opposition Result	Opposition Result	Opposition Result	Opposition Result	Opposition Result	Rank
Zdeněk Chládek	Light welterweight	Mönkh-Erdene (MGL); L 12–20	Did not advance				

== Canoeing ==
=== Slalom ===
Czech Republic has qualified boats for all slalom events.

Athlete	Event	Preliminary						Semifinal		Final	
Athlete	Event	Run 1	Rank	Run 2	Rank	Best	Rank	Time	Rank	Time	Rank
Vavřinec Hradilek	Men's K-1	87.44	2	87.66	2	87.44	3 Q	99.58	8 Q	94.78	2nd place, silver medalist(s)
Stanislav Ježek	Men's C-1	94.09	4	206.82	16	94.09	9 Q	104.37	7 Q	105.73	5
Stanislav Ježek; Vavřinec Hradilek	Men's C-2	104.00	6	150.87	11	104.00	8 Q	115.50	9	Did not advance	
Ondřej Štěpánek; Jaroslav Volf	Men's C-2	106.91	8	DNS		106.91	9 Q	112.22	7	Did not advance	
Štěpánka Hilgertová	Women's K-1	101.50	3	100.75	3	100.75	5 Q	114.10	9 Q	109.16	4

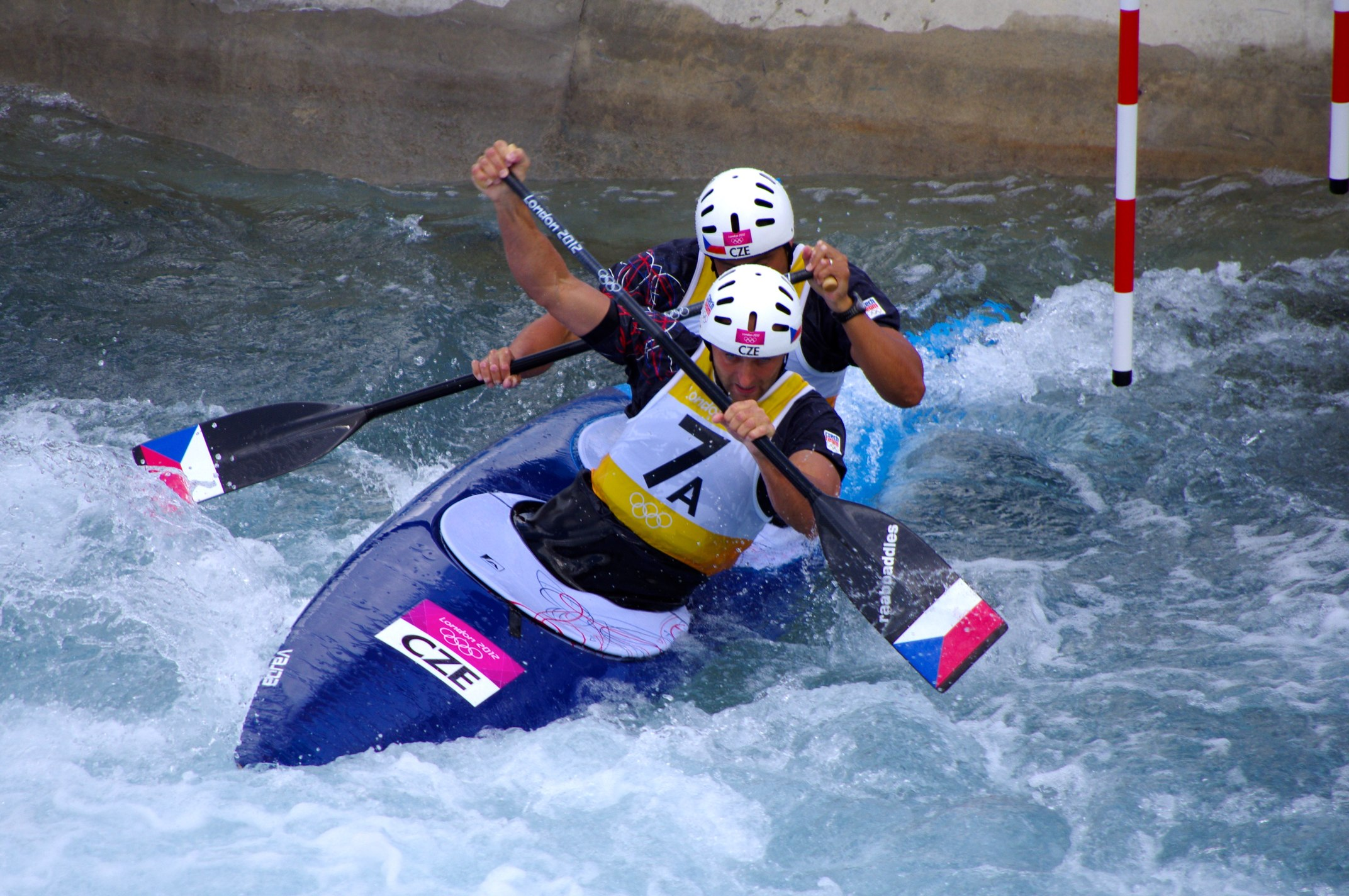
Jaroslav Volf and Ondřej Štěpánek in the C-2 semifinal

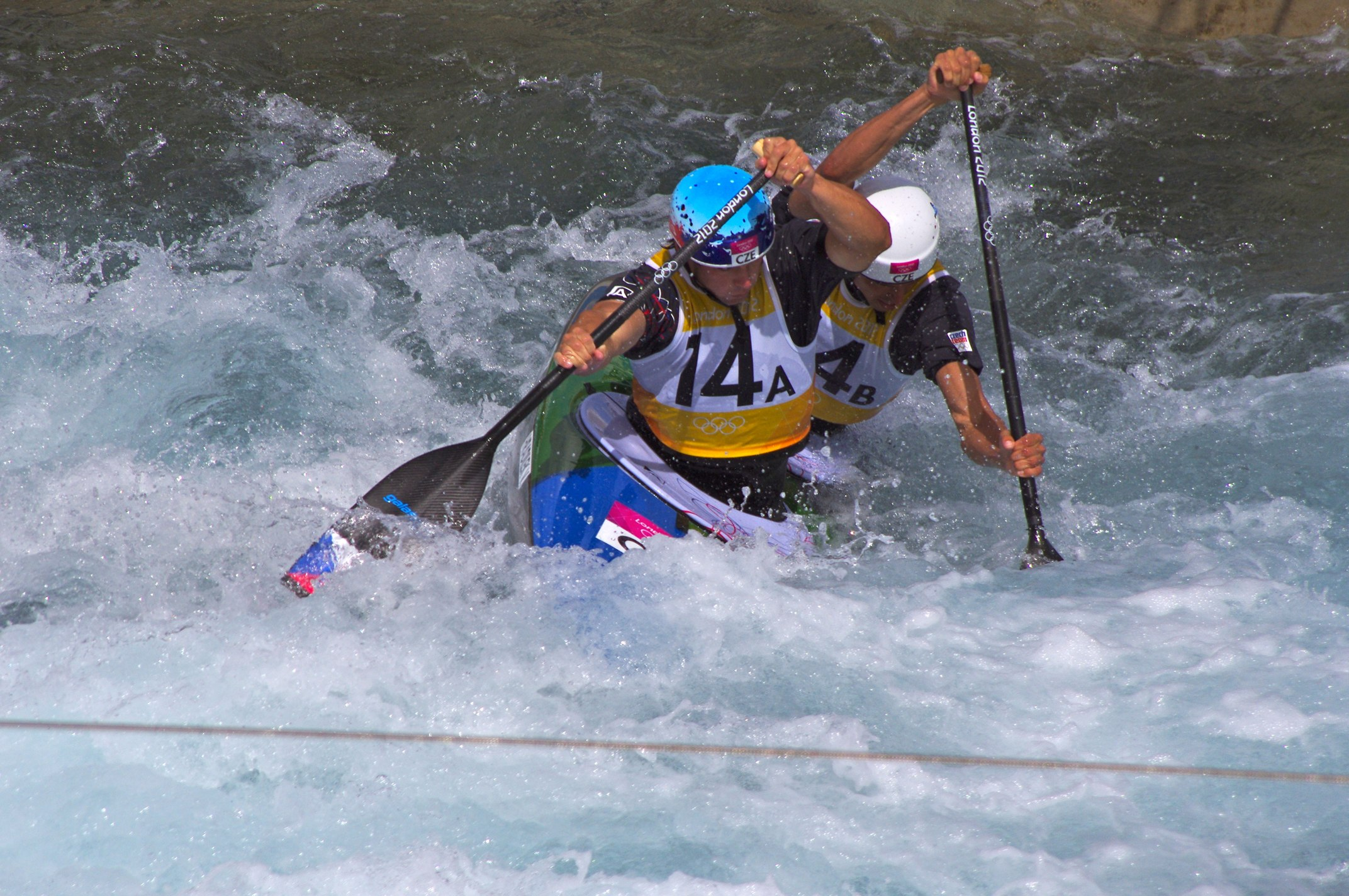
Vavřinec Hradilek and Stanislav Ježek in the C-2 semifinal

=== Sprint ===
Czech Republic has qualified boats for the following events.

Athlete	Event	Heats		Semifinals		Final	
Athlete	Event	Time	Rank	Time	Rank	Time	Rank
Filip Dvořák; Jaroslav Radoň	Men's C-2 1000 m	3:38.711	4 Q	3:37.839	2 FA	3:37.601	5
Josef Dostál; Daniel Havel; Jan Štěrba; Lukáš Trefil	Men's K-4 1000 m	2:54.267	2 Q	2:54.303	3 FA	2:55.850	3rd place, bronze medalist(s)

Qualification Legend: FA = Qualify to final (medal); FB = Qualify to final B (non-medal)

== Cycling ==
=== Road ===
Athlete	Event	Time	Rank
Jan Bárta	Men's road race	5:46:37	75
Roman Kreuziger	Men's road race	5:46:05	15

=== Track ===
Sprint

Athlete	Event	Qualification		Round 1	Repechage 1	Round 2	Repechage 2	Quarterfinals	Semifinals	Final	
Athlete	Event	Time Speed (km/h)	Rank	Opposition Time Speed (km/h)	Opposition Time Speed (km/h)	Opposition Time Speed (km/h)	Opposition Time Speed (km/h)	Opposition Time Speed (km/h)	Opposition Time Speed (km/h)	Opposition Time Speed (km/h)	Rank
Pavel Kelemen	Men's sprint	10.311; 96.828	13	Canelón (VEN); W REL	Bye	Watkins (USA); L	Förstemann (GER); Esterhuizen (RSA); L	Did not advance		9th place final Nakagawa (JPN); Esterhuizen (RSA); Canelón (VEN); L	10

Keirin

Athlete	Event	1st round	Repechage	2nd round	Final
Athlete	Event	Rank	Rank	Rank	Rank
Denis Špička	Men's keirin	5 R	6	Did not advance	17

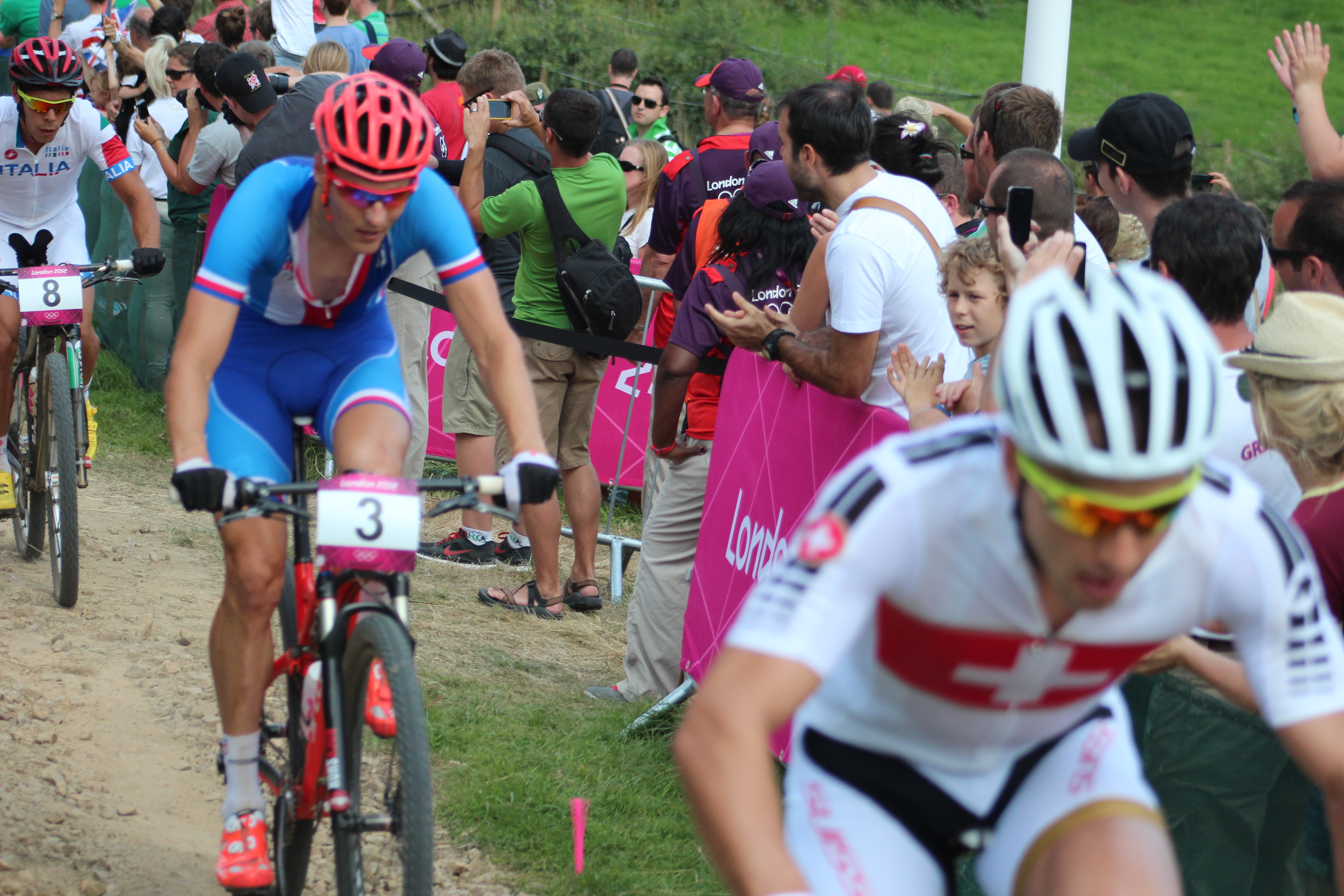
Jaroslav Kulhavý (in blue) and Swiss Nino Schurter making pace atop men's MTB cross country race

=== Mountain biking ===
Athlete	Event	Time	Rank
Ondřej Cink	Men's cross-country	1:32:16	14
Jaroslav Kulhavý	Men's cross-country	1:29:07	1st place, gold medalist(s)
Jan Škarnitzl	Men's cross-country	1:31:48	12
Kateřina Nash	Women's cross-country	1:36:22	14

=== BMX ===
Athlete	Event	Seeding		Semifinal		Final	
Athlete	Event	Result	Rank	Points	Rank	Result	Rank
Aneta Hladíková	Women's BMX	40.846	10	16	5	Did not advance	
Romana Labounková	Women's BMX	41.096	11	17	6	Did not advance	

== Gymnastics ==
=== Artistic ===
Men

Athlete	Event	Qualification								Final							
Athlete	Event	Apparatus						Total	Rank	Apparatus						Total	Rank
Athlete	Event	F	PH	R	V	PB	HB	Total	Rank	F	PH	R	V	PB	HB	Total	Rank
Martin Konečný	All-around	14.266	12.900	13.166	14.866	13.733	14.100	83.031	34	Did not advance							

Women

Athlete	Event	Qualification						Final					
Athlete	Event	Apparatus				Total	Rank	Apparatus				Total	Rank
Athlete	Event	F	V	UB	BB	Total	Rank	F	V	UB	BB	Total	Rank
Kristýna Pálešová	All-around	12.966	13.800	14.133	9.700	50.599	47	Did not advance					

=== Trampoline ===
Athlete	Event	Qualification		Final	
Athlete	Event	Score	Rank	Score	Rank
Zita Frydrychová	Women's	76.560	15	Did not advance	

== Judo ==
Czech Republic qualified 3 judokas.

Athlete	Event	Round of 64	Round of 32	Round of 16	Quarterfinals	Semifinals	Repechage	Final / BM	
Athlete	Event	Opposition Result	Opposition Result	Opposition Result	Opposition Result	Opposition Result	Opposition Result	Opposition Result	Rank
Jaromír Ježek	Men's 73 kg	Bye	Smith (SAM); W 0100–0000	Wang K-c (KOR); L 0001–0010	Did not advance				
Jaromír Musil	Men's 81 kg	—N/a	Toma (MDA); L 0001–1000	Did not advance					
Lukáš Krpálek	Men's 100 kg	—N/a	Bye	Anai (JPN); W 1001–0000	Khaibulaev (RUS); L 0011–1000	Did not advance	Grol (NED); L 0000–1010	Did not advance	7

== Modern pentathlon ==
Czech Republic has qualified three athletes in modern pentathlon.

Athlete	Event	Fencing (épée one touch)			Swimming (200 m freestyle)			Riding (show jumping)			Combined: shooting/running (10 m air pistol)/(3000 m)			Total points	Final rank
Athlete	Event	Results	Rank	MP points	Time	Rank	MP points	Penalties	Rank	MP points	Time	Rank	MP points	Total points	Final rank
Ondřej Polívka	Men's	12–23	=34	688	2:02.71	=10	1328	64	15	1136	10:25.99	4	2500	5652	15
David Svoboda	Men's	26–9	1	1024 OR	2:04.84	17	1304	68	16	1132	10:33.02	6	2468	5928 OR	1st place, gold medalist(s)
Natálie Dianová	Women's	17–18	=19	808	2:13.78	7	1196	144	28	1056	12:33.61	23	1988	5048	22

== Rowing ==
Czech Republic has so far qualified boats for the following events

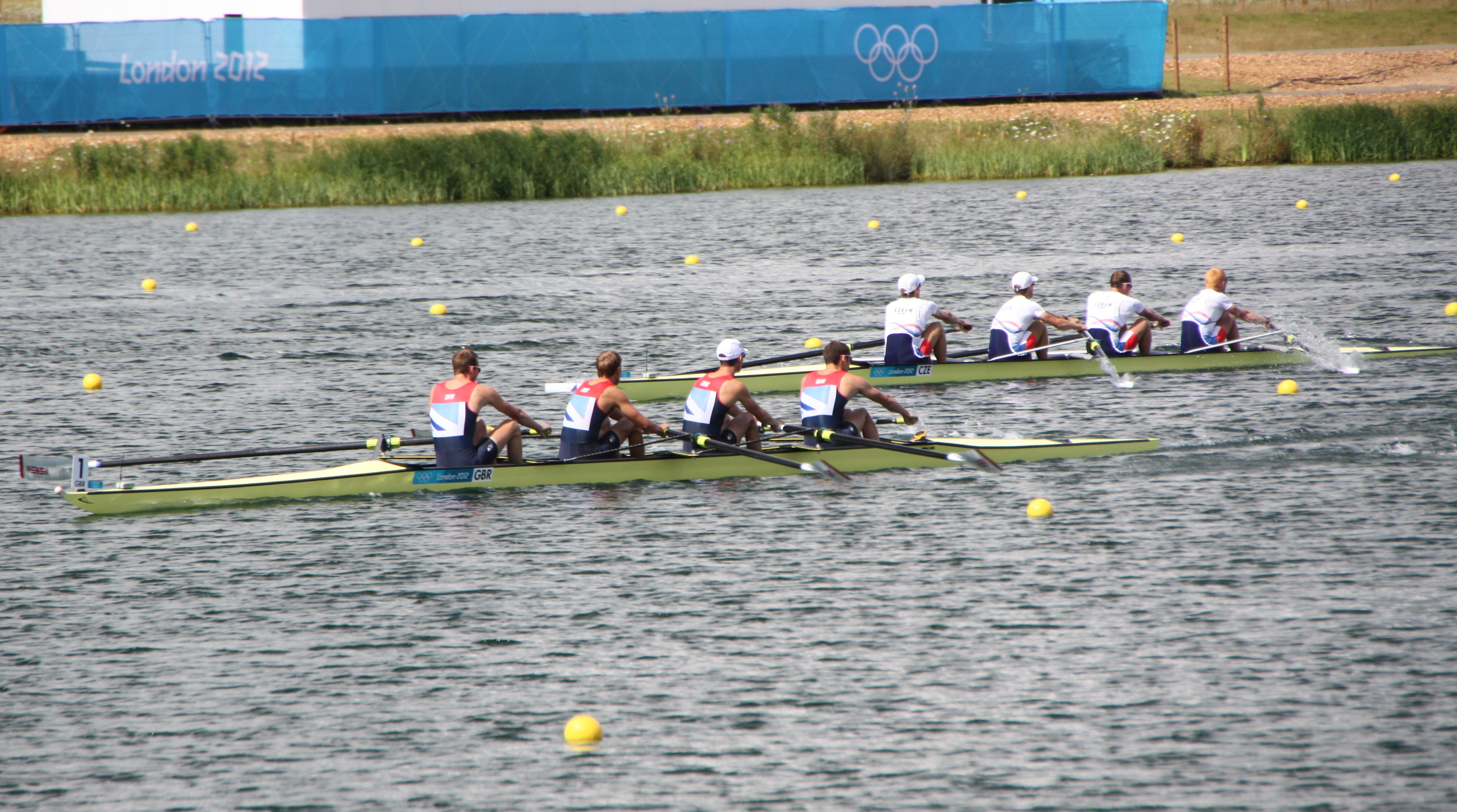
Men's lightweight coxless four (right) in heat 2

Men

Athlete	Event	Heats		Repechage		Quarterfinals		Semifinals		Final	
Athlete	Event	Time	Rank	Time	Rank	Time	Rank	Time	Rank	Time	Rank
Ondřej Synek	Single sculls	6:53.23	1 QF	—N/a		6:53.32	1 SA/B	7:16.58	1 FA	6:59.37	2nd place, silver medalist(s)
Milan Bruncvík; Michal Horváth; Matyáš Klang; Jakub Podrazil	Four	5:54.37	4 R	6:04.56	4	—N/a		Did not advance			13
Jiří Kopáč; Jan Vetešník; Ondřej Vetešník; Miroslav Vraštil Jr.	Lightweight four	5:52.69	4 R	6:02.23	3 SA/B	—N/a		6:06.85	6 FB	6:11.49	11

Women

Athlete	Event	Heats		Repechage		Quarterfinals		Semifinals		Final	
Athlete	Event	Time	Rank	Time	Rank	Time	Rank	Time	Rank	Time	Rank
Miroslava Knapková	Single sculls	7:24.17	1 QF	—N/a		7:35.35	1 SA/B	7:42.57	1 FA	7:54.37	1st place, gold medalist(s)
Jitka Antošová; Lenka Antošová	Double sculls	7:05.05	5 R	7:11.68	3 FA	—N/a				7:24.93	7

Qualification Legend: FA=Final A (medal); FB=Final B (non-medal); FC=Final C (non-medal); FD=Final D (non-medal); FE=Final E (non-medal); FF=Final F (non-medal); SA/B=Semifinals A/B; SC/D=Semifinals C/D; SE/F=Semifinals E/F; QF=Quarterfinals; R=Repechage

== Sailing ==
Czech Republic has so far qualified 1 boat for each of the following events

Men

Athlete	Event	Race											Net points	Final rank
Athlete	Event	1	2	3	4	5	6	7	8	9	10	M*	Net points	Final rank
Karel Lavický	RS:X	30	29	32	34	~~BFD~~	34	36	31	DNF	31	EL	296	36
Viktor Teplý	Laser	29	27	31	34	32	25	11	34	~~37~~	11	EL	234	28
Michal Maier	Finn	19	18	21	10	18	~~23~~	18	20	23	15	EL	162	21

Women

Athlete	Event	Race											Net points	Final rank
Athlete	Event	1	2	3	4	5	6	7	8	9	10	M*	Net points	Final rank
Veronika Fenclová	Laser Radial	~~23~~	4	7	6	21	2	17	6	12	12	18	105	9

M = Medal race; EL = Eliminated – did not advance into the medal race;

== Shooting ==
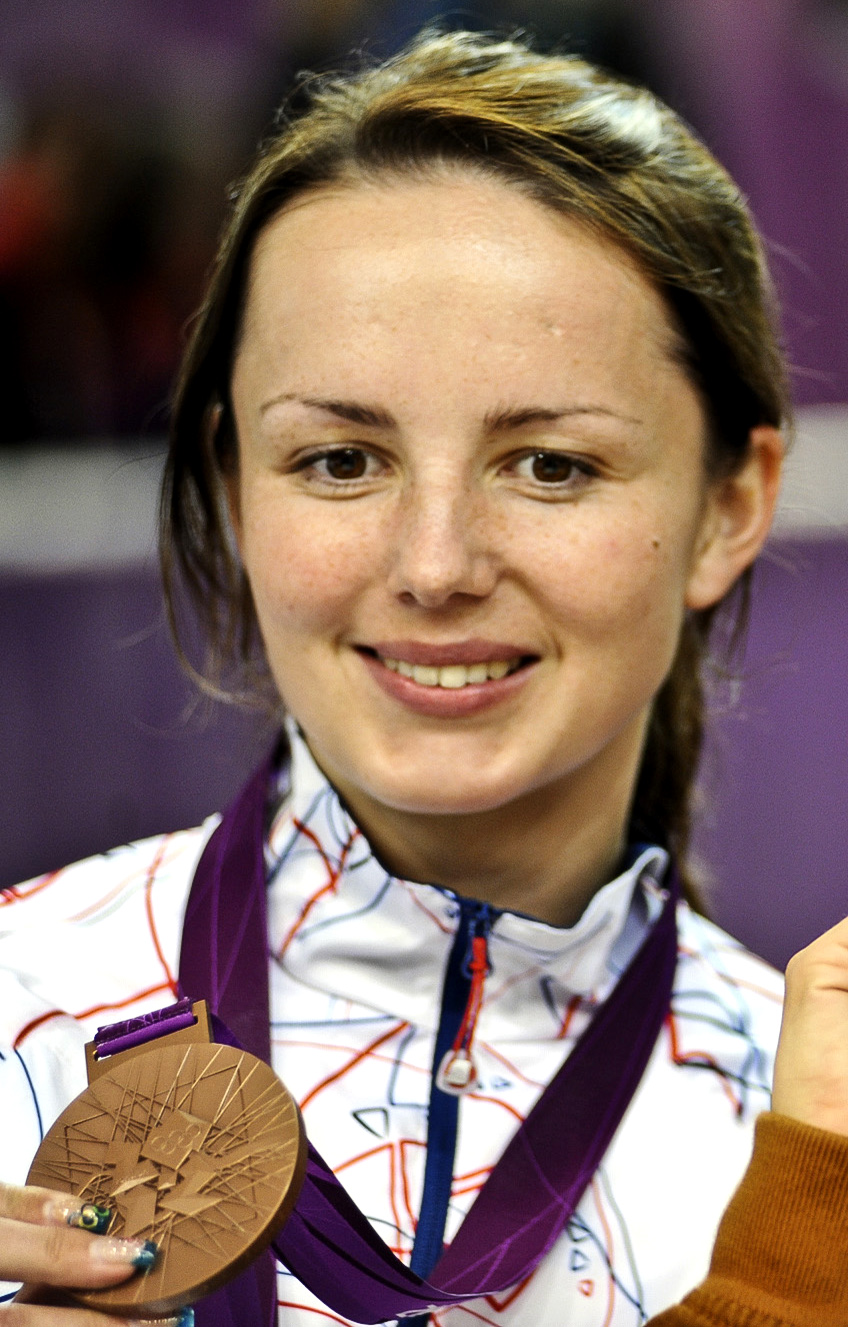
Adéla Sýkorová won the bronze in the women's rifle three positions

Men

Athlete	Event	Qualification		Final	
Athlete	Event	Points	Rank	Points	Rank
Václav Haman	50 m rifle 3 positions	1153	34	Did not advance	
Václav Haman	50 m rifle prone	588	41	Did not advance	
Václav Haman	10 m air rifle	590	33	Did not advance	
David Kostelecký	Trap	120	14	Did not advance	
Jiří Lipták	Trap	119	18	Did not advance	
Martin Podhráský	25 m rapid fire pistol	583	7	Did not advance	
Martin Strnad	25 m rapid fire pistol	580	9	Did not advance	
Jan Sychra	Skeet	120	6 Q	143	6
Jakub Tomeček	Skeet	117	19	Did not advance	

Women

Athlete	Event	Qualification		Final	
Athlete	Event	Points	Rank	Points	Rank
Kateřina Emmons	50 m rifle 3 positions	576	32	Did not advance	
Kateřina Emmons	10 m air rifle	397	8 Q	500.3	4
Lenka Marušková	25 m pistol	582	13	Did not advance	
Lenka Marušková	10 m air pistol	385	7 Q	482.6	8
Adéla Sýkorová	50 m rifle 3 positions	584	4 Q	683.0	3rd place, bronze medalist(s)
Adéla Sýkorová	10 m air rifle	392	31	Did not advance	

== Swimming ==
Czech swimmers have so far achieved qualifying standards in the following events (up to a maximum of 2 swimmers in each event at the Olympic Qualifying Time (OQT), and potentially 1 at the Olympic Selection Time (OST)):

Men

Athlete	Event	Heat		Semifinal		Final	
Athlete	Event	Time	Rank	Time	Rank	Time	Rank
Jan Micka	1500 m freestyle	15:29.34	24	—N/a		Did not advance	
Martin Verner	100 m freestyle	49.49	23	Did not advance			

Women

Athlete	Event	Heat		Semifinal		Final	
Athlete	Event	Time	Rank	Time	Rank	Time	Rank
Simona Baumrtová	100 m backstroke	59.99 NR	10 Q	1:00.02	10	Did not advance	
Simona Baumrtová	200 m backstroke	2:10.03	12 Q	2:10.18	14	Did not advance	
Petra Chocová	100 m breaststroke	1:08.59	24	Did not advance			
Martina Moravčíková	200 m breaststroke	2:28.54	26	Did not advance			
Jana Pechanová	10 km open water	—N/a				1:58:52.8	9
Barbora Závadová	200 m individual medley	2:17.54	32	Did not advance			
Barbora Závadová	400 m individual medley	4:41.84	15	—N/a		Did not advance	

== Synchronized swimming ==
Czech Republic has qualified 2 quota places in synchronized swimming.

Athlete	Event	Technical routine		Free routine (preliminary)			Free routine (final)		
Athlete	Event	Points	Rank	Points	Total (technical + free)	Rank	Points	Total (technical + free)	Rank
Soňa Bernardová; Alžběta Dufková	Duet	85.800	14	86.040	171.840	14	Did not advance		

== Table tennis ==
Athlete	Event	Preliminary round	Round 1	Round 2	Round 3	Round 4	Quarterfinals	Semifinals	Final / BM	
Athlete	Event	Opposition Result	Opposition Result	Opposition Result	Opposition Result	Opposition Result	Opposition Result	Opposition Result	Opposition Result	Rank
Dana Hadačová	Women's singles	Bye	Miao (AUS); L 2–4	Did not advance						
Iveta Vacenovská	Women's singles	Bye		Komwong (THA); W 4–1	Wu Jd (GER); L 2–4	Did not advance				

== Tennis ==
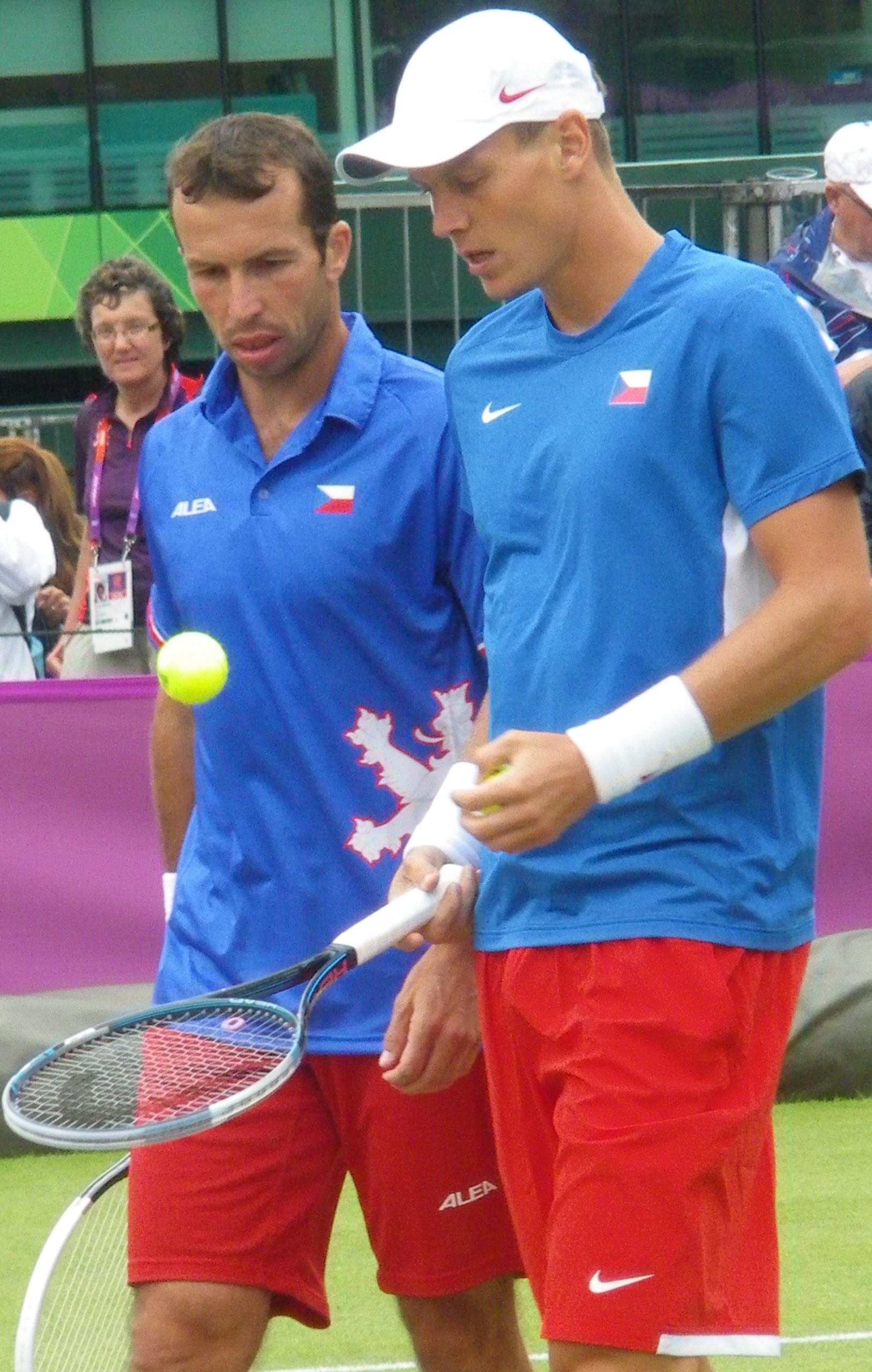
Radek Štěpánek and Tomáš Berdych during their first match in men's doubles.

Men

Athlete	Event	Round of 64	Round of 32	Round of 16	Quarterfinals	Semifinals	Final / BM	
Athlete	Event	Opposition Score	Opposition Score	Opposition Score	Opposition Score	Opposition Score	Opposition Score	Rank
Tomáš Berdych	Singles	Darcis (BEL); L 4–6, 4–6	Did not advance					
Radek Štěpánek	Singles	Davydenko (RUS); L 4–6, 3–6	Did not advance					
Tomáš Berdych; Radek Štěpánek	Doubles	—N/a	Bracciali / Seppi (ITA); W 4–6, 7–6^{(7–5)}, 6–4	Melo / Soares (BRA); L 6–1, 4–6, 22–24	Did not advance			

Women

Athlete	Event	Round of 64	Round of 32	Round of 16	Quarterfinals	Semifinals	Final / BM	
Athlete	Event	Opposition Score	Opposition Score	Opposition Score	Opposition Score	Opposition Score	Opposition Score	Rank
Petra Cetkovská	Singles	Kerber (GER); L 1–6, 0–3^{r}	Did not advance					
Petra Kvitová	Singles	Bondarenko (UKR); W 6–4, 5–7, 6–4	Peng (CHN); W 7–5, 2–6, 6–1	Pennetta (ITA); W 6–3, 6–0	Kirilenko (RUS); L 6–7^{(3–7)}, 3–6	Did not advance		
Lucie Šafářová	Singles	Robson (GBR); L 6–7^{(4–7)}, 4–6	Did not advance					
Klára Zakopalová	Singles	Schiavone (ITA); L 3–6, 6–3, 4–6	Did not advance					
Petra Cetkovská; Lucie Šafářová	Doubles	—N/a	Errani / Vinci (ITA); L 2–6, 3–6	Did not advance				
Andrea Hlaváčková; Lucie Hradecká	Doubles	—N/a	Babos / Szávay (HUN); W 6–1, 6–7^{(5–7)}, 6–2	Li / Zhang (CHN); W 6–3, 6–1	C-j Chuang / S-w Hsieh (TPE); W 6–3, 6–4	Huber / L Raymond (USA); W 6–1, 7–6^{(7–2)}	S. Williams / V. Williams (USA); L 4–6, 4–6	2nd place, silver medalist(s)

Mixed

Athlete	Event	Round of 16	Quarterfinals	Semifinals	Final / BM	
Athlete	Event	Opposition Score	Opposition Score	Opposition Score	Opposition Score	Rank
Radek Štěpánek; Lucie Hradecká	Doubles	Murray / Robson (GBR); L 5–7, 7–6^{(9–7)}, [7–10]	Did not advance			

== Triathlon ==
Czech Republic has qualified the following athletes.

Athlete	Event	Swim (1.5 km)	Trans 1	Bike (40 km)	Trans 2	Run (10 km)	Total Time	Rank
Jan Čelůstka	Men's	17:25	0:40	58:49	0:29	32:54	1:50:17	30
Přemysl Švarc	Men's	18:08	0:41	59:37	0:29	33:13	1:52:08	45
Vendula Frintová	Women's	19:30	0:42	1:05:27	0:32	35:57	2:02:08	15
Radka Vodičková	Women's	19:18	0:41	1:05:40	0:34	36:21	2:02:34	20

== Volleyball ==
=== Beach ===
Athlete	Event	Preliminary round	Standing	Round of 16	Quarterfinals	Semifinals	Final / BM	
Athlete	Event	Opposition Score	Standing	Opposition Score	Opposition Score	Opposition Score	Opposition Score	Rank
Petr Beneš; Přemysl Kubala	Men's	Pool B Gavira – Herrera (ESP); L 0–2 (23–25, 16–21) Asahi – Shiratori (JPN); W 2–1 (17–21, 21–12, 15–7); Dalhausser – Rogers (USA); L 0–2 (13–21, 15–21); Lucky Losers; Erdmann – Matysik (GER); L 1–2 (21–15, 19–21, 13–15)	3	Did not advance				17
Lenka Háječková; Hana Klapalová	Women's	Pool A Holtwick – Semmler (GER); L 0–2 (16–21, 18–21); Rigobert – Li Yuk Lo (MRI); W 2–0 (21–10, 21–11); Juliana – Larissa (BRA); L 0–2 (12–21, 18–21); Lucky Losers; Meppelink – van Gestel (NED); L 0–2 (17–21, 17–21)	3	Did not advance				17
Kristýna Kolocová; Markéta Sluková	Women's	Pool C D. Schwaiger – S. Schwaiger (AUT); W 1–2 (10–21, 21–13, 15–13); May-Treanor – Walsh Jennings (USA); L 0–2 (14–21, 19–21); Cook – Hinchley (AUS); W 2–1 (21–16, 18–21, 15–10)	2 Q	Antonelli – Antunes (BRA); W 2–1 (21–16, 20–22, 15–9)	Kessy – Ross (USA); L 0–2 (23–25, 18–21)	Did not advance		5

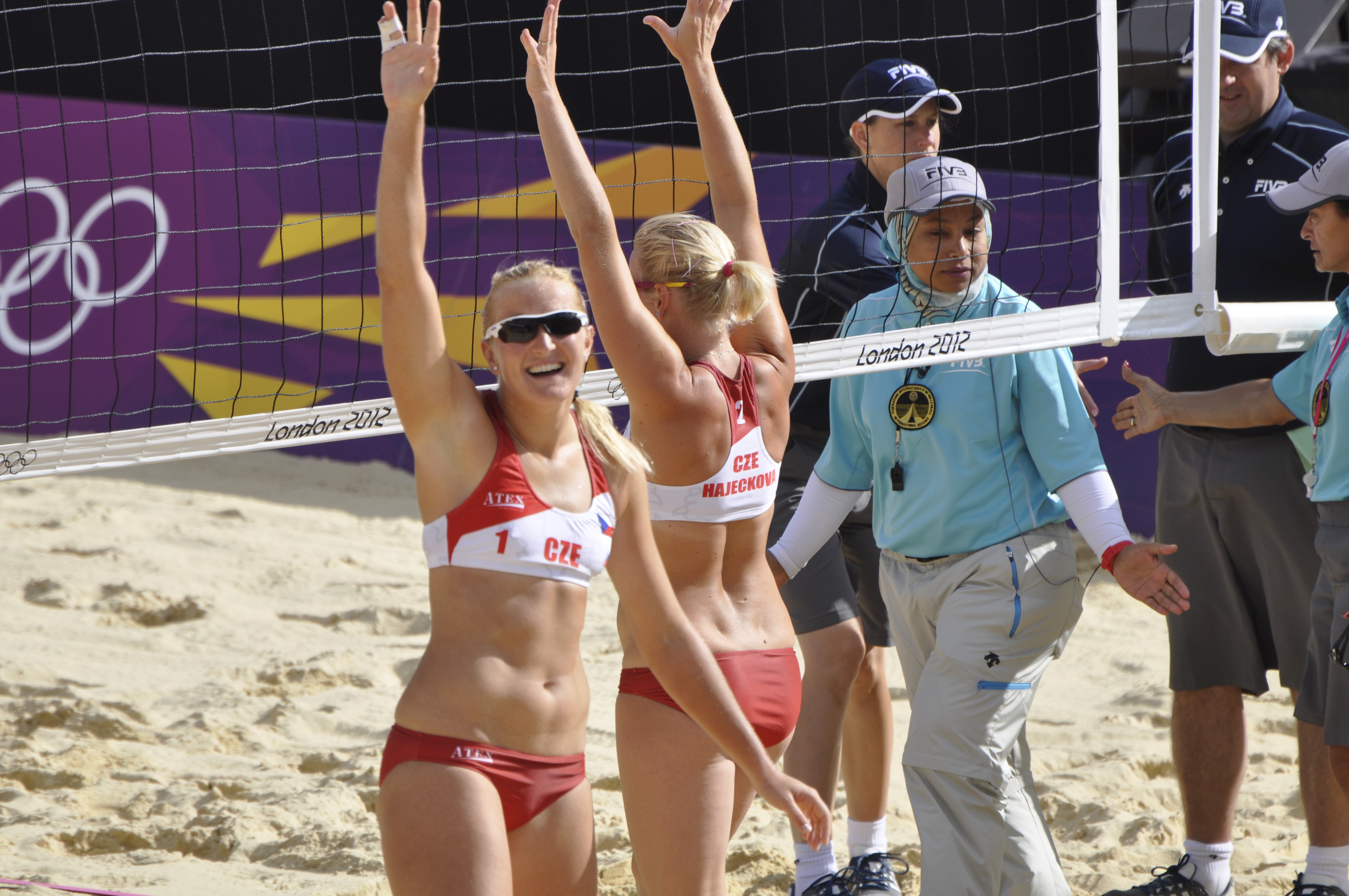
Klapalová and Háječková in their second match

== Weightlifting ==
Czech Republic has qualified the following quota places.

Athlete	Event	Snatch		Clean & jerk		Total	Rank
Athlete	Event	Result	Rank	Result	Rank	Total	Rank
Jiří Orság	Men's +105 kg	187	9	239	5	426	7

== Wrestling ==
Czech Republic has qualified 1 quota.

Key:

- VT - Victory by Fall.
- PP - Decision by Points - the loser with technical points.
- PO - Decision by Points - the loser without technical points.

Men's Greco-Roman

Athlete	Event	Qualification	Round of 16	Quarterfinal	Semifinal	Repechage 1	Repechage 2	Final / BM	
Athlete	Event	Opposition Result	Opposition Result	Opposition Result	Opposition Result	Opposition Result	Opposition Result	Opposition Result	Rank
David Vála	96 kg	Bye	Estrada (CUB); L 1–3 ^{PP}	Did not advance					12
