= Stanislau (given name) =

Stanislau (Belarusian: Станіслаў), also transliterated as Stanislaŭ or Stanisłaŭ, is the Belarusian-language form of the given name Stanislav. It may refer to:

- Stanislau Bazhkou (born 1991), Belarusian cyclist
- Stanislau Bulak-Balakhovich (1883 – 1940), Belarusian general
- Stanislau Drahun (born 1988), Belarusian professional footballer
- Stanislaus Katczinsky, All Quiet on the Western Front character
- Stanislau Neviarouski (born 1981), Belarusian former swimmer
- Stanislau Tsivonchyk (born 1985), Belarusian pole vaulter
- Stanislau Shcharbachenia (born 1985), Belarusian rower
- Stanislau Shushkevich (1934–2022), Belarusian politician and scientist.
- Stanislau Zhurauliou (born 1988), Belarusian modern pentathlete

== See also ==
- Stanislau
