= 2014 World Modern Pentathlon Championships =

International sports competition

2014 World Championships
- Location: Warsaw, Poland
- Dates: 1–7 September

The 2014 World Modern Pentathlon Championships was held in Warsaw, Poland from September 1 to September 7, 2014. The event included pistol shooting, fencing, 200m swimming, show jumping and a 3 km run.

== Medal summary ==
=== Men's events ===
Event	Gold	Silver	Bronze
Individual	Aleksander Lesun (RUS)	Amro El Geziry (EGY)	Jan Kuf (CZE)
Team	Hungary; Róbert Kasza; Bence Demeter; Ádám Marosi	France; Valentin Belaud; Valentin Prades; Christopher Patte	China; Guo Jianli; Han Jiahao; Su Haihang
Relay	France; Valentin Belaud; Valentin Prades	Belarus; Stanislau Zhurauliou; Raman Pinchuk	South Korea; Lee Woo-jin; Hwang Woo-jin

=== Women's events ===
Event	Gold	Silver	Bronze
Individual	Samantha Murray (GBR)	Chen Qian (CHN)	Liang Wanxia (CHN)
Team	China; Chen Qian; Liang Wanxia; Wang Wei	Great Britain; Freyja Prentice; Samantha Murray; Kate French	Belarus; Tatsiana Yelizarova; Anastasiya Prokopenko; Katsiaryna Arol
Relay	China; Qian Chen; Wanxia Liang	Belarus; Anastasiya Prokopenko; Katsiaryna Arol	Italy; Camilla Lontano; Lavinia Bonessio

=== Mixed events ===
Event	Gold	Silver	Bronze
Relay	Lithuania; Justinas Kinderis; Laura Asadauskaitė	Great Britain; Joseph Evans; Kate French	Poland; Szymon Staśkiewicz; Oktawia Nowacka

== Medal table ==
	Nation	(gold) Gold	(silver) Silver	(bronze) Bronze	Total
1	China	2	1	2	5
2	Great Britain	1	2	0	3
3	France	1	1	0	2
4	Hungary	1	0	0	1
4	Lithuania	1	0	0	1
4	Russia	1	0	0	1
7	Belarus	0	2	1	3
8	Egypt	0	1	0	1
9	South Korea	0	0	1	1
9	Italy	0	0	1	1
9	Poland	0	0	1	1
9	Czech Republic	0	0	1	1
	TOTAL	7	7	7	21

== See also ==
- Union Internationale de Pentathlon Moderne (UIPM)
