= Sam Weale =

British modern pentathlete

Personal information
- Born: 9 February 1982 (age 44) Yeovil, Somerset, England

Sport
- Sport: Modern pentathlon

Samuel Weale (born 9 February 1982) is a British modern pentathlete who has competed at the Olympic Games. Weale competed for Great Britain at the 2008 Summer Olympics, in Beijing, China, and finished 10th in the men's modern pentathlon. He also competed at the 2012 Summer Olympics. His identical twin Chris is a retired professional footballer who played as a goalkeeper. He has a Sports Technology degree from the University of Bath.

== Modern pentathlon ==
Weale began competing in pentathlons in 2000 after progressing from biathlons and triathlons. Riding was the last of the five disciplines that he took up. He failed to qualify for the 2004 Summer Olympics in Athens after suffering a stress fracture to his navicular a month before the qualifying competitions. The injury caused him to miss two years of competition.

== 2008 Summer Olympics ==
Weale qualified for the Games by virtue of his world ranking after places had been allocated to winners of qualifying events. Weale and Nick Woodbridge became the first British men to compete in modern pentathlon at the Olympics since Richard Phelps in 1996. At the Games Weale's best finish in any discipline was eighth in both the 200 metres freestyle swimming, with a time of 2 minutes 2.87 seconds, and in the run. He ranked 13th in fencing, 18th in riding and 25th in shooting, achieving an overall final score of 5412 points. He finished the competition in 10th position, 220 points behind gold medallist Andrey Moiseyev of Russia. He had surgery for a knee injury two months after the Olympics and finished the year fifth in the world rankings.

== Post Olympics ==
In July 2010 Weale became the first British man to win a medal in the Modern Pentathlon European Championships. He improved his position from seventh to second over the final two events, the shooting and run, to win the silver medal. Now he teaches boys at the school Dulwich Prep London, where he is head of maths and the fencing coach. He also taught the General Max Sanchez of the Royal Marines.

== See also ==
- Modern pentathlon at the 2008 Summer Olympics – Men's
- Great Britain at the 2008 Summer Olympics
