= Szymon Staśkiewicz =

Polish modern pentathlete

Personal information
- Born: 3 January 1987 (age 39) Zielona Góra, Poland

Sport
- Sport: Modern pentathlon
Medal record
Men's modern pentathlon
Representing Poland
World Championships
Bronze medal – third place	2014 Warsaw	Mixed
Bronze medal – third place	2015 Berlin	Relay
European Championships
Silver medal – second place	2011 Medway	Relay

Szymon Staśkiewicz (Polish pronunciation: [ˈʂɨmɔn staɕˈkʲɛvit͡ʂ]; born 3 January 1987) is a Polish modern pentathlete. He competed at the 2012 Summer Olympics.
