= David Svoboda =

Czech modern pentathlete

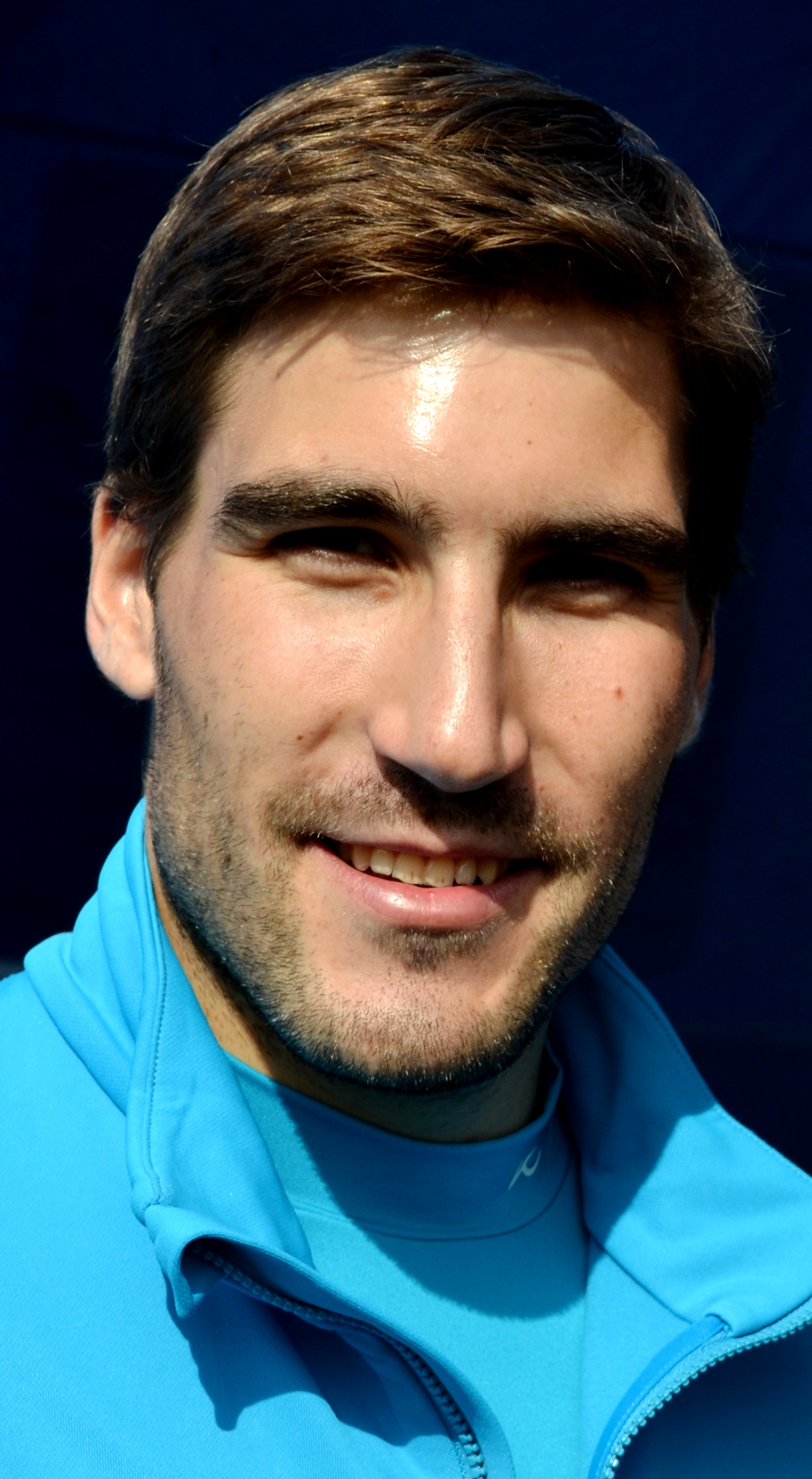
- Svoboda in 2013

Personal information
- Born: 19 March 1985 (age 41) Prague, Czech Republic
Medal record
Men's modern pentathlon
Representing Czech Republic
Olympic Games
Gold medal – first place	2012 London	Individual
World Championships
Gold medal – first place	2009 London	Relay
Silver medal – second place	2007 Berlin	Team
Silver medal – second place	2008 Budapest	Individual
Silver medal – second place	2009 London	Individual
Silver medal – second place	2009 London	Team
Silver medal – second place	2010 Chengdu	Team
Bronze medal – third place	2005 Warsaw	Relay
Bronze medal – third place	2007 Berlin	Relay
European Championships
Gold medal – first place	2010 Debrecen	Individual
Silver medal – second place	2009 Lipsk	Team
Silver medal – second place	2010 Debrecen	Team
Bronze medal – third place	2008 Moscow	Team
Bronze medal – third place	2011 Medway	Team
Bronze medal – third place	2012 Sofia	Mixed Relay
- Updated on 24 August 2012

David Svoboda (Czech pronunciation: [ˈdavɪt ˈsvoboda]; born 19 March 1985) is a retired Czech athlete who competed in the modern pentathlon. At the 2012 London Olympics, Svoboda won the gold medal in the Olympic pentathlon. At the 2008 Olympics, Svoboda placed 28th in the pentathlon.

David is the twin brother of professional triathlete Tomáš Svoboda.

== Working in the Czech Olympic Committee ==
=== Statement on the participation of Russian athletes at the 2024 Olympics ===
On March 29, 2023, he caused outrage and a media storm with his comments on Czech TV on the dispute over the participation of Russian and Belarusian athletes at the 2024 Olympic Games in Paris in connection with Russian aggression in Ukraine. He was invited to an interview on Studio ČT24 as the Czech Olympic Committee Sportsmen's Commission chairman. In his answers, he questioned Russian war crimes in Ukraine.

Several personalities criticized his statements, for example, Dominik Hašek, who declared on Twitter that Svoboda supported Russian propaganda and crimes, including the genocide of Ukrainian children, and must bear the consequences for this. Vavřinec Hradilek and Lukáš Rohan, members of the Czech Olympic Committee Sportsmen's Commission, distanced themselves from his opinions and declared that Svoboda's opinion is not the commission's. Journalist Jiří X. Doležal even commented that he should be stripped of his functions and uniform and tried for questioning genocide under Section 405 of the Czech Criminal Code. Defense Minister Jana Černochová joined the criticism, distancing herself from Svoboda's statements on behalf of the entire defense department, inviting him to the interview and showing him 200 photos of killed Ukrainian athletes.

Svoboda apologized for his statements and publicly asked for forgiveness, for which he drew criticism from people who welcomed his original statement. He resigned from his position in the commission, saying that "the dual role of a soldier and a representative of athletes in the commission does not go together." The director of DUKLA Army Sports Center, Pavel Benc, announced that Svoboda would receive a written reprimand because he neglected the obligation of a professional soldier "to behave even outside of duty in such a way as not to endanger the seriousness and credibility of the armed forces."
