= Nick Woodbridge =

British modern pentathlete

Personal information
- Born: 1 July 1986 (age 40) Wellington, Shropshire, England

Sport
- Sport: Modern pentathlon

Nicholas Lloyd Woodbridge (born 1 July 1986) is a British modern pentathlete. The modern pentathlon includes the disciplines of shooting, swimming, fencing, equestrian, and cross country running. Woodbridge competed for Great Britain at the 2008 Summer Olympics, in Beijing, China, and finished 25th in the men's modern pentathlon. He also competed at the 2012 Summer Olympics. where he finished in 10th place despite being ranked 3rd in the world. In 2013 he achieved his best career result when he took the silver medal in the World Championships.

== Modern Pentathlon ==
Woodbridge began swimming with Wellington Swimming Club and joined Telford Athletics Club. He rode horses from the age of three and bought his own horse aged 11. In order to compete in Pony Club tetrathlons he learnt how to shoot and by 13 he was also fencing with Much Wenlock Fencing Club.

In 1999 he competed in his first pentathlon at the National Championships, finishing third. In 2000 he won the National Championships and joined the Great Britain team for the first time. He won gold at the 2004 World Youth Championships in Bulgaria under the guidance of Gary Hollywood (National Youth Academy Coach) and took two medals in World Cup events and a top-20 finish at the 2006 World Championships whilst still a junior.

He achieved the best result of his career to date when he won bronze at the 2011 World Cup Final in London, which was the London 2012 test event for modern pentathlon. He had made a piece of history by becoming the first British male pentathlete to win a World Cup Final medal. That propelled him from 30th in the senior world rankings to 10th – his first appearance in the top10.

He started 2012 as the highest-ranked British male pentathlete in the world in 11th and has since climbed to 9th after two 6th places in the first two World Cups of 2012 in Charlotte, USA and Rio de Janeiro, Brazil.

== 2008 Summer Olympics ==
Woodbridge qualified for the 2008 Olympics after the Australian Olympic Committee were forced to deselect Alex Parygin. Parygin had qualified for the Games by winning the Oceania Championships in Tokyo in 2007 however the show-jumping discipline was not contested at the event due to an outbreak of equine influenza. The British team challenged his inclusion, taking their case to the Court of Arbitration for Sport and when Parygin was withdrawn his place at the Games went to Woodbridge who was the highest-ranked pentathlete not previously qualified.

Woodbridge and Sam Weale became the first British men to compete in modern pentathlon at the Olympics since Richard Phelps in 1996. At the Games Woodbridge set a personal best of 1 minute 55.96 seconds in the 200 m freestyle swimming discipline. This was the second fastest time of anyone in the swimming and faster than the previous Olympic record. He finished 12th in the riding, 20th in the run, 29th in fencing and 35th in shooting earning a final overall score of 5168 points. He finished in 25th position, 464 points behind gold medallist Andrey Moiseyev of Russia.

== See also ==
- Modern pentathlon at the 2008 Summer Olympics – Men's
- Great Britain at the 2008 Summer Olympics
