= Jan Kreisinger =

Czech long-distance runner

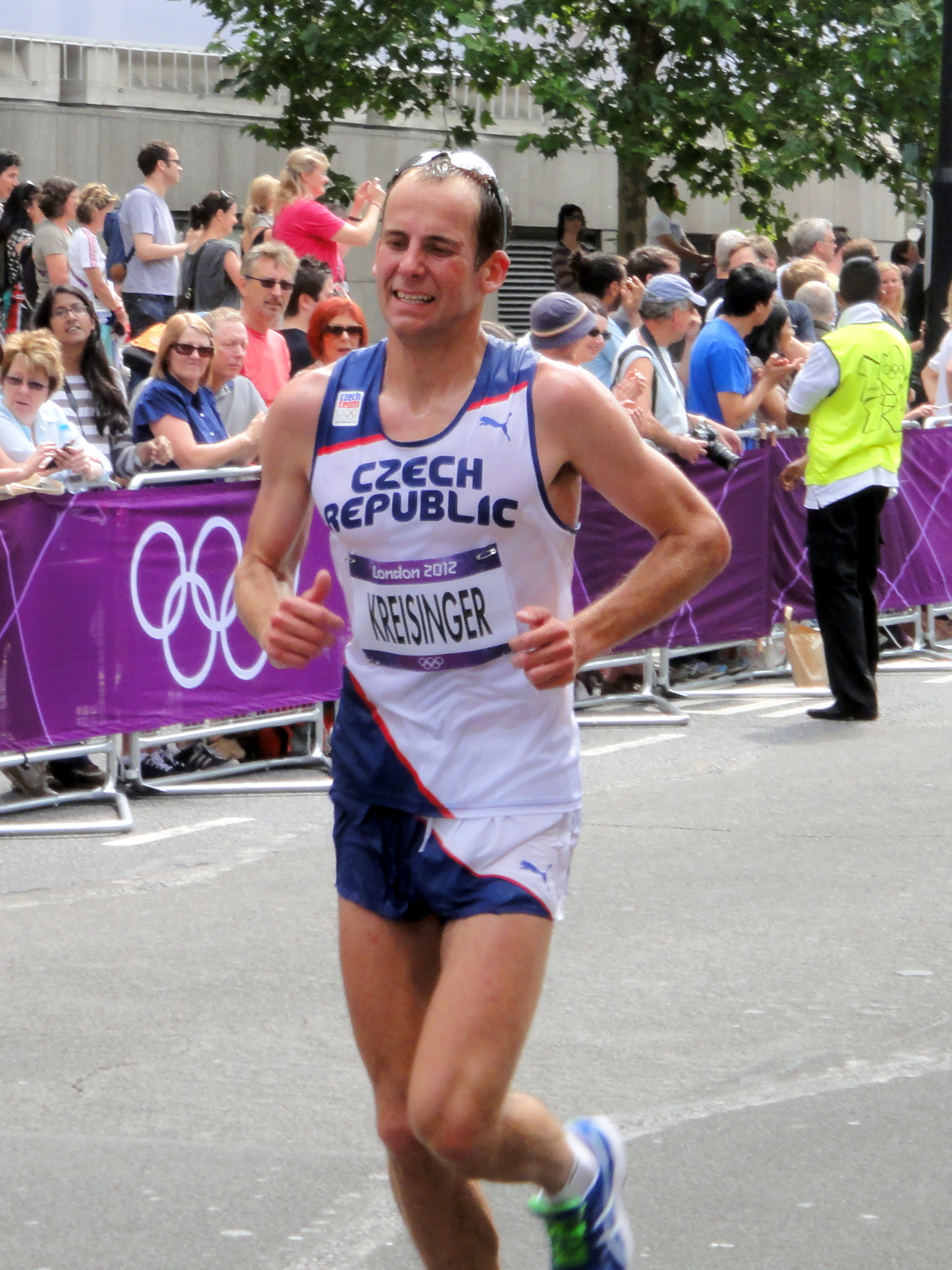
- Kreisinger in the marathon at the 2012 Olympics in London

Personal information
- Born: 16 September 1984 (age 41) Žatec, Czechoslovakia
- Height: 1.86 m (6 ft 1 in)
- Weight: 70 kg (150 lb)

Sport
- Country: Czech Republic
- Sport: Athletics
- Event: Marathon

Jan Kreisinger (Czech pronunciation: [ˈjan ˈkrajsɪŋɡr̩]; born 6 September 1984) is a Czech long-distance runner. At the 2012 Summer Olympics, he competed in the Men's marathon, finishing in 67th place.
