= Stanislau Zhurauliou =

Belarusian modern pentathlete

Personal information
- Nationality: Belarus
- Born: 14 April 1988 (age 38) Homel, Belarus
- Height: 1.90 m (6 ft 3 in)
- Weight: 77 kg (170 lb)

Sport
- Sport: Modern pentathlon
- Club: Dynamo Minsk
- Coached by: Vasili Gulevich

Stanislau Zhurauliou (Belarusian: Станіслаў Жураўлёў; born April 14, 1988, in Homel) is a modern pentathlete from Belarus. He competed at the 2012 Summer Olympics in London, England, where he finished sixteenth in the men's event, with a score of 5,648 points.

Zhurauliou also won a silver medal at the 2012 UIPM World Cup in Rostov-on-Don, Russia. He currently works as a firefighter in a local department.
