= 2023 Modern Pentathlon World Cup =

- Sport: Modern pentathlon
- Hosts: (Egypt) Cairo (Turkey) Ankara(2 times) (Hungary) Budapest (Bulgaria) Sofia
- Duration: 6 March – 4 June

Seasons
- ← 2022 2024 →

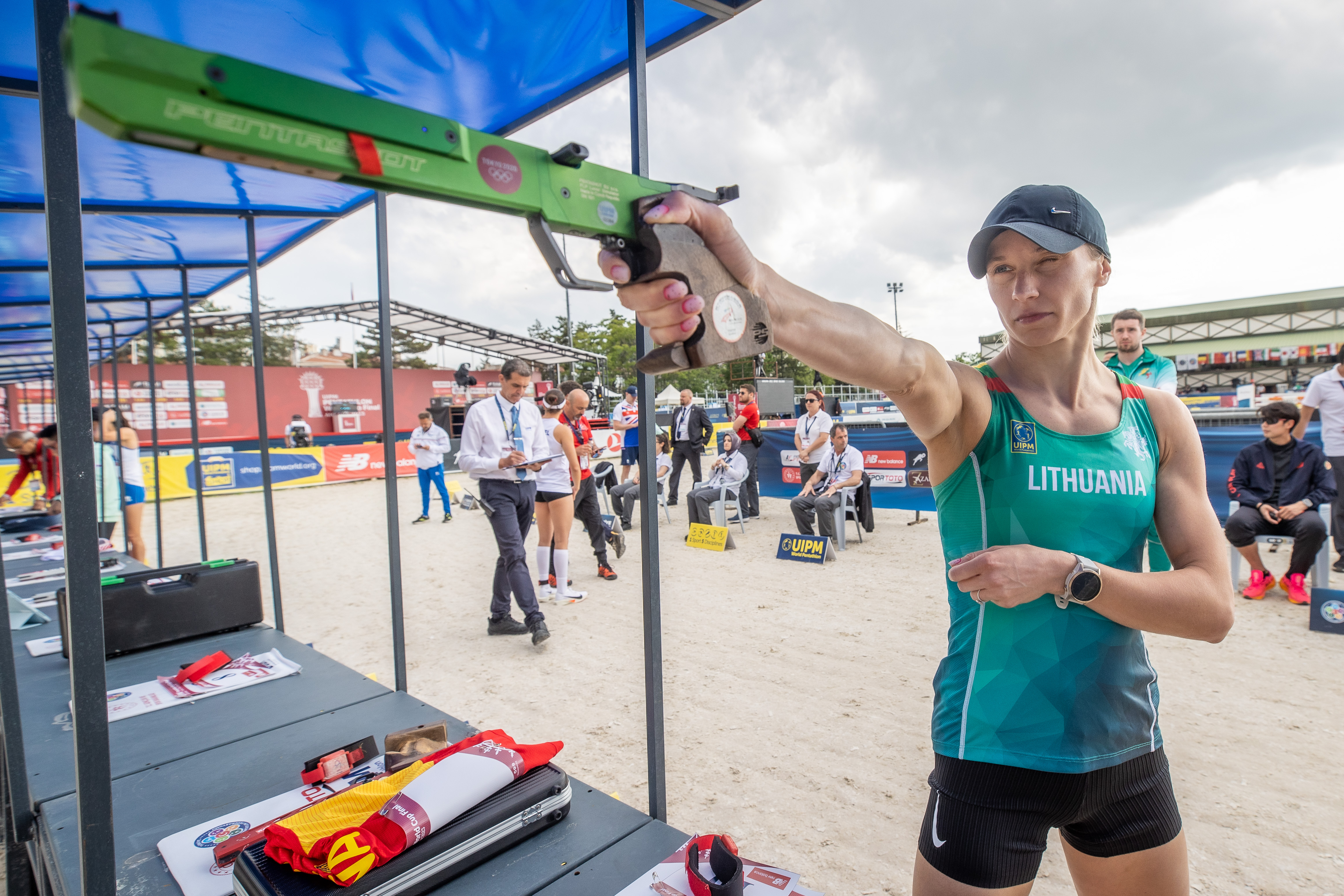
World Cup Final - Gintarė Venčkauskaitė-Juškienė.

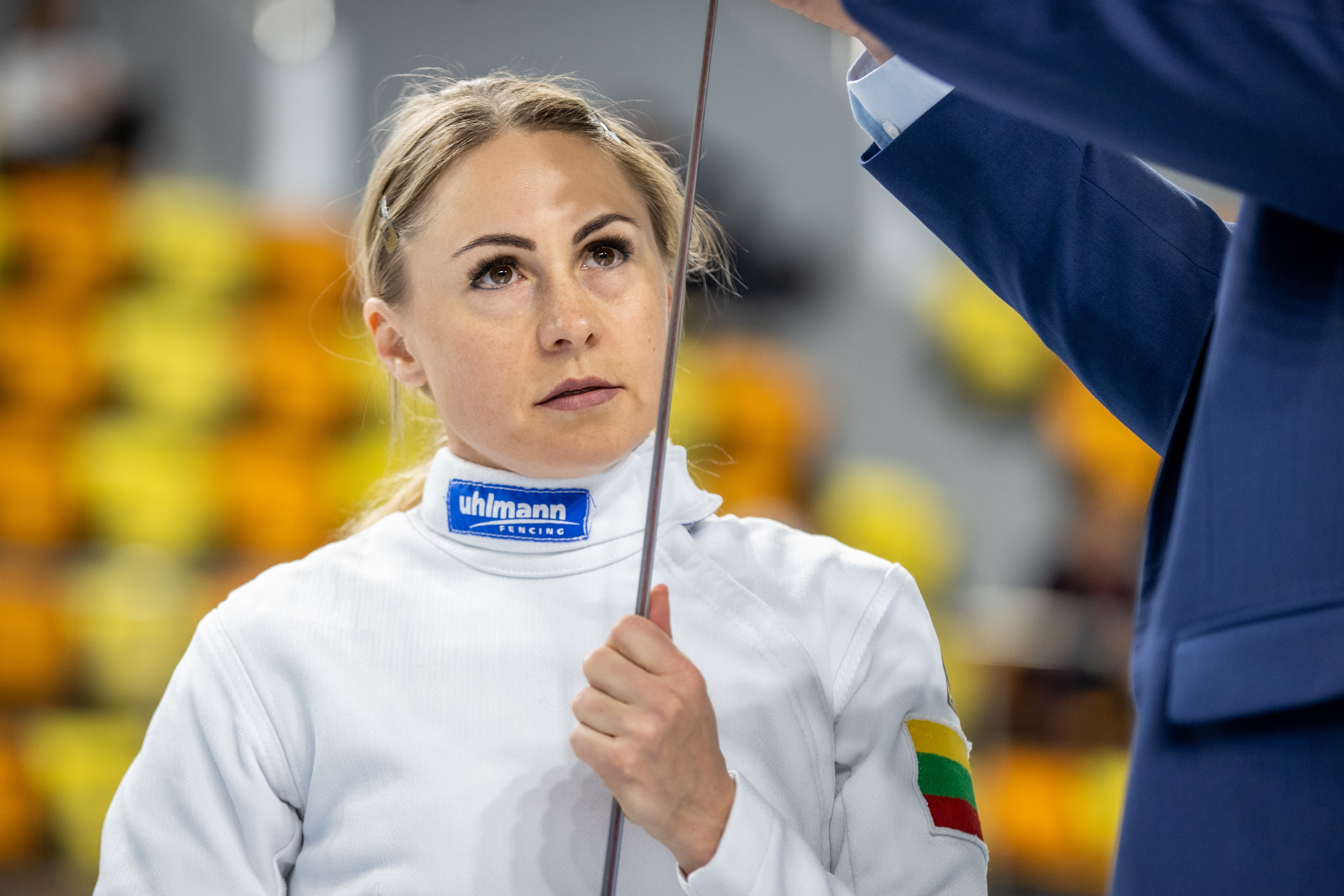
World Cup Final - Laura Asadauskaitė-Zadneprovskienė.

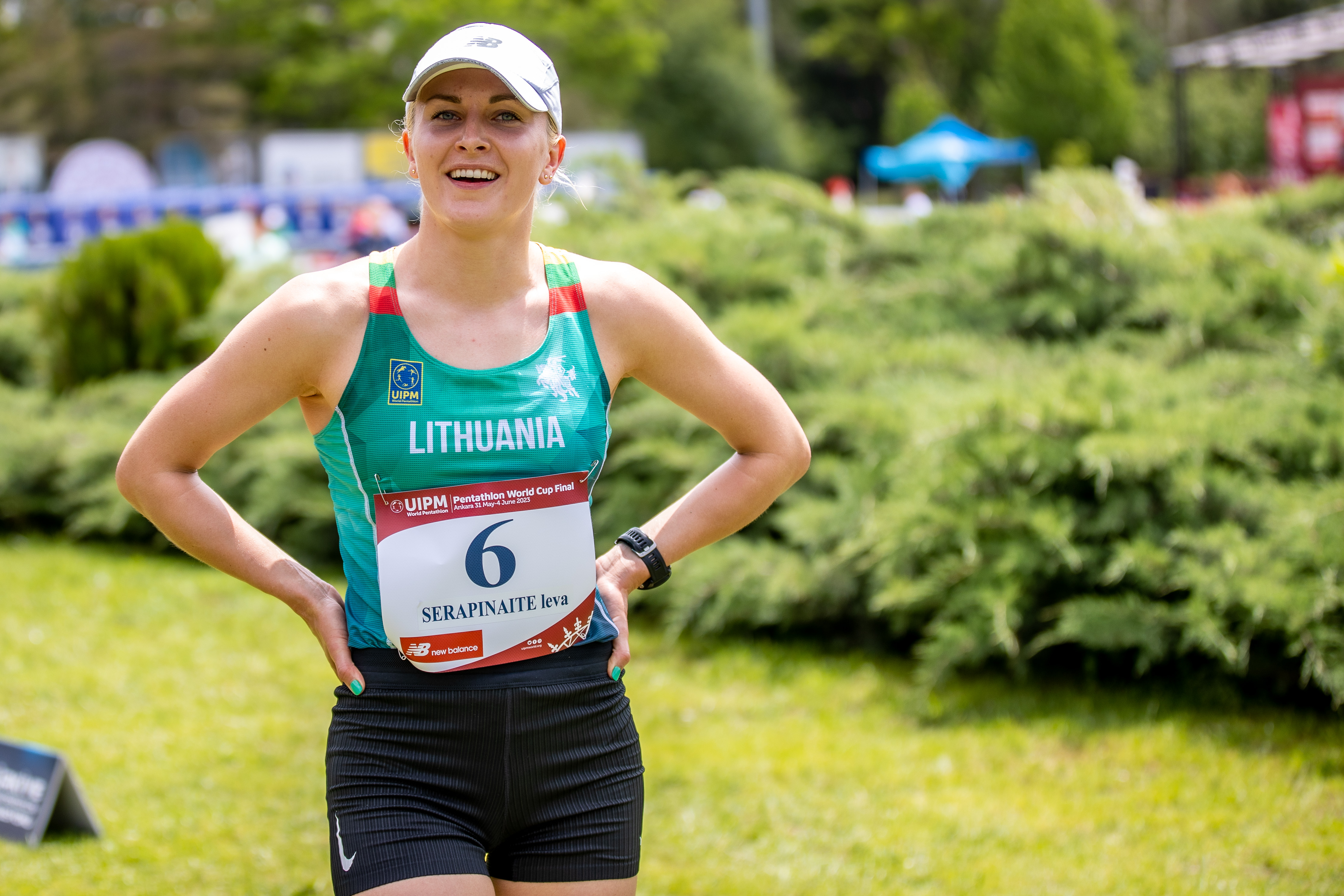
World Cup Final - Ieva Serapinaitė.

The 2023 Modern Pentathlon World Cup was the annual edition of the Modern Pentathlon World Cup in the Olympic modern pentathlon format, governed by the UIPM.

== Calendar ==
The calendar for the 2023 ISSF World Cup include 5 stages.

Date	Location	Ref.
6–12 March	Cairo, Egypt	
10–16 April	Ankara, Turkey	
24–30 April	Budapest, Hungary	
8–15 May	Sofia, Bulgaria	
30 May – 4 June	Ankara, Turkey	

== Results ==
=== Men's individual ===
Stage	Venue	1st place, gold medalist(s)	2nd place, silver medalist(s)	3rd place, bronze medalist(s)
1	(Egypt) Cairo	Ahmed El-Gendy (EGY)	Csaba Bőhm (HUN)	Martin Vlach (CZE)
2	(Turkey) Ankara	Mohanad Shaban (EGY)	Jun Woong-tae (KOR)	Ahmed El-Gendy (EGY)
3	(Hungary) Budapest	Jun Woong-tae (KOR)	Mohanad Shaban (EGY)	Martin Vlach (CZE)
4	(Bulgaria) Sofia	Valentin Prades (FRA)	Taishu Sato (JPN)	Marvin Dogue (GER)
5	(Turkey) Ankara	Mohanad Shaban (EGY)	Joe Choong (GBR)	Emiliano Hernández (MEX)

=== Women's individual ===
Stage	Venue	1st place, gold medalist(s)	2nd place, silver medalist(s)	3rd place, bronze medalist(s)
1	(Egypt) Cairo	Michelle Gulyás (HUN)	Elodie Clouvel (FRA)	Salma Abdelmaksoud (EGY)
2	(Turkey) Ankara	Ieva Serapinaitė (LTU)	Rebecca Langrehr (GER)	Mariana Arceo (MEX)
3	(Hungary) Budapest	Blanka Guzi (HUN)	Michelle Gulyás (HUN)	Salma Abdelmaksoud (EGY)
4	(Bulgaria) Sofia	Kerenza Bryson (GBR)	Seong Seung-min (KOR)	Ieva Serapinaitė (LTU)
5	(Turkey) Ankara	Elena Micheli (ITA)	İlke Özyüksel (TUR)	Marie Oteiza (FRA)

=== Mixed team relay ===
Stage	Venue	1st place, gold medalist(s)	2nd place, silver medalist(s)	3rd place, bronze medalist(s)
1	(Egypt) Cairo	Lithuania; Titas Puronas; Gintarė Venčkauskaitė	Mexico; Manuel Padilla; Mariana Arceo	South Korea; Kim Soeng-jin; Jang Hae-un
2	(Turkey) Ankara	Turkey; Buğra Ünal; İlke Özyüksel	Mexico; Manuel Padilla; Mariana Arceo	Great Britain; Myles Pillage; Jessica Varley
3	(Hungary) Budapest	South Korea; Seo Chang-wan; Kim Sun-woo	Mexico; Manuel Padilla; Mariana Arceo	France; Jean-Baptiste Mourcia; Rebecca Castaudi
4	(Bulgaria) Sofia	Great Britain; Charles Brown; Kerenza Bryson	Mexico; Emiliano Hernández; Catherine Mayran Oliver	France; Jean-Baptiste Mourcia; Jessye Gomesse
5	(Turkey) Ankara	South Korea; Jun Woong-tae; Kim Sun-woo	France; Christopher Patte; Rebecca Castaudi	Hungary; Balázs Szép; Blanka Bauer

== Medal table ==
Rank	Nation	Gold	Silver	Bronze	Total
1	South Korea (KOR)	3	2	1	6
2	Egypt (EGY)	3	1	3	7
3	Hungary (HUN)	2	2	1	5
4	Great Britain (GBR)	2	1	1	4
5	Lithuania (LTU)	2	0	1	3
6	France (FRA)	1	2	3	6
7	Turkey (TUR)	1	1	0	2
8	Italy (ITA)	1	0	0	1
9	Mexico (MEX)	0	4	2	6
10	Germany (GER)	0	1	1	2
11	Japan (JPN)	0	1	0	1
12	Czech Republic (CZE)	0	0	2	2
Totals (12 entries)		15	15	15	45
