= 2024 in modern pentathlon =

This topic lists the modern pentathlon sports for the 2024 season.

== Biathle/Triathle ==
=== World & Continental Championships ===
- May 5–12: 2024 Pan American Open Championships (Obstacle Triathle - U15/U17/U19) in (Cuba) Varadero
- July 2–5: 2024 Biathle/Triathle European Championships in (Portugal) Funchal
- October 10–13: 2024 UIPM Biathle/Triathle World Championships in (Egypt) Port Said

=== UIPM Biathle/Triathle National Tour ===
- April 5: B/T NT #1 in (Peru) Lima
- June 23–24: B/T NT #2 in (Egypt) Alexandria
- June 26–30: B/T NT #3 in (Kazakhstan) Burabay
- June 29–30: B/T NT #4 in (Moldova) Chişinău
- September 6–7: B/T NT #5 in (Egypt) Port Said

== Modern pentathlon ==
=== World Championships ===
- June 9–16: 2024 World Modern Pentathlon Championships in (China) Zhengzhou
- June 24–30: 2024 World Junior Modern Pentathlon Championships in (Egypt) Alexandria
- August 21–25: 2024 FISU World University Modern Pentathlon Championships in (Lithuania) Kaunas
- September 9–15: 2024 World U17 Modern Pentathlon Championships in (Portugal) Caldas da Rainha
- September 23–29: 2024 World U19 Modern Pentathlon Championships in (Lithuania) Druskininkai
- December 4–8: 2024 World U15 Modern Pentathlon Championships in Guatemala City

=== Continental Championships ===
- April 10–15: 2024 Asian Senior & U19 Modern Pentathlon Championships in (South Korea) Hwaseong
- June 24–30: 2024 African Senior & Junior Modern Pentathlon Championships in (Egypt) Alexandria
- July 2–7: 2024 European U17 Modern Pentathlon Championships in (Turkey) Istanbul
- July 8–14: 2024 European Modern Pentathlon Championships in (Hungary) Budapest
- July 23–28: 2024 European U19 Modern Pentathlon Championships in (Spain) Barcelona
- August 13–18: 2024 European Junior & U15 Modern Pentathlon Championships in (Bulgaria) Sofia
- September 2–7: 2024 European U24 Modern Pentathlon Championships in (Poland) Drzonków
- October 3–6: 2024 South & Pan American Senior & Junior Modern Pentathlon Championships in (Brazil) São Paulo

=== 2024 Modern Pentathlon World Cup ===
- March 5–10: MPWC #1 in (Egypt) Cairo
  - Winners: (Egypt) Ahmed El-Gendy (m) / (Hungary) Michelle Gulyás (w)
  - Mixed team relay winners: (Mexico) Duilio Carrillo & Mariana Arceo
- April 16–21: MPWC #2 in (Turkey) Ankara #1
  - Winners: (South Korea) Seo Chang-wan (m) / (United Kingdom) Kerenza Bryson (w)
  - Mixed team relay winners: (Kazakhstan) Pavel Ilyashenko & Yelena Potapenko
- April 23–28: MPWC #3 in (Hungary) Budapest
  - Winners: (Egypt) Mohamed Elgendy (m) / (Authorised Neutral Athletes) Mariya Gnedtchik (w)
  - Mixed team relay winners: (Mexico) Manuel Padilla & Mayan Oliver
- May 8–13: MPWC #4 in (Bulgaria) Sofia
  - Winners: (France) Pierre Dejardin (m) / (Hungary) Blanka Guzi (w)
  - Mixed team relay winners: (Egypt) Haydy Morsy & Mohanad Shaban
- May 22–26: MPWC #5 (final) in (Turkey) Ankara #2
  - Winners: (Hungary) Csaba Bőhm (m) / (Lithuania) Gintarė Venčkauskaitė (w)
  - Mixed team relay winners: (Hungary) Balázs Szép & Michelle Gulyás

=== Other events ===
- January 24–28: UIPM Challenger in (Egypt) Cairo
  - Winners: (Egypt) Mohamed El-Gendy (m) / (Turkey) İlke Özyüksel (w)
- February 7–12: Hungarian Open Indoor Championships in (Hungary) Budapest
  - Winners: (United Kingdom) Charles Brown (men) / Egypt (men team)
- February 24–25: Open Trophee Christophe Ruer in (France) Perpignan
  - Winners: (France) Melvin Perrier (m) / (France) Louison Cazaly (w)
- March 1–3: National Ranking Competition U19 & U17 in (Poland) Drzonków
  - Winners: (France) Mathis Rochat (m) / (Poland) Adrianna Kapała (w)
- April 20–21: Trophy Vila Sant Boi in (Spain) Sant Boi de Llobregat
- April 20–21: European Cup U15, U17 & U19 in (Spain) Sant Boi de Llobregat
- May 18–19: Queen D. Leonor International Cup Junior, U17 & U19 in (Portugal) Caldas da Rainha
- June 20–24: Central Asian Cup/Kyrgyzstan Open Championship in Bishkek
- October 2–6: Yuri Khorishko Memorial in (Kyrgyzstan) Bishkek

== Laser-run ==
=== World & Continental Championships ===
- May 5–12: 2024 Pan American Open Championships (Obstacle Laser Run - U15/U17/U19) in (Cuba) Varadero
- June 7–9: 2024 UIPM Laser Run World Championships in (China) Zhengzhou
- July 6–7: 2024 Laser Run European Championships in (Portugal) Funchal

=== UIPM Global Laser Run City Tour ===
- March 1: GLRCT #1 in (Egypt) Alexandria
- March 2: GLRCT #2 in Kuwait City
- March 9: GLRCT #3 in (Lithuania) Šiauliai
- April 26: GLRCT #4 in (Egypt) Cairo
- May 1: GLRCT #5 in (Lithuania) Telšiai
- May 11: GLRCT #6 in (Afghanistan) Kabul
- June 15–16: GLRCT #7 in (Malaysia) Kuala Lumpur
- August 21–24: GLRCT #8 in (Kazakhstan) Kokshetau
- September 7–8: GLRCT #9 in (Czech Republic) Kopřivnice
- September 22: GLRCT #10 in (Moldova) Ungheni
- September 28: GLRCT #11 in (Moldova) Chişinău
- October 2: GLRCT #12 in (North Macedonia) Skopje
- November 8: GLRCT #13 in (Egypt) Qalyub
- November 9: GLRCT #14 in (Peru) Lima

=== Other events ===
- June 1–2: Laser Run Riga/Riga Open in (Latvia) Riga

== Masters ==
- June 1–2: French Open Masters Championships in (France) Argelers
- October 10–12: Open Moldovan Masters Championships in (Moldova) Chişinău
