= 2024 Modern Pentathlon World Cup =

- Sport: Modern pentathlon
- Hosts: (Egypt) Cairo (Turkey) Ankara(2 times) (Hungary) Budapest (Bulgaria) Sofia
- Duration: 5 March – 26 May

Seasons
- ← 2023 2025 →

The 2024 Modern Pentathlon World Cup is the annual edition of the Modern Pentathlon World Cup in the Olympic modern pentathlon format, governed by the UIPM.

== Calendar ==
The calendar for the 2024 ISSF World Cup includes 5 stages.

Date	Location	Ref.
5–10 March	Cairo, Egypt	
16–21 April	Ankara, Turkey	
23–28 April	Budapest, Hungary	
8–13 May	Sofia, Bulgaria	
22–26 May	Ankara, Turkey	

== Results ==
=== Men's individual ===
Stage	Venue	1st place, gold medalist(s)	2nd place, silver medalist(s)	3rd place, bronze medalist(s)
1	(Egypt) Cairo	Ahmed El-Gendy (EGY)	Moutaz Mohamed (EGY)	Kamil Kasperczak (POL)
2	(Turkey) Ankara	Seo Chang-wan (KOR)	Moutaz Mohamed (EGY)	Ahmed El-Gendy (EGY)
3	(Hungary) Budapest	Mohamed Elgendy (EGY)	Balázs Szép (HUN)	Mohanad Shaban (EGY)
4	(Bulgaria) Sofia	Pierre Dejardin (FRA)	Mohanad Shaban (EGY)	Mohamed Elgendy (EGY)
5	(Turkey) Ankara	Csaba Bőhm (HUN)	Valentin Prades (FRA)	Ahmed El-Gendy (EGY)

=== Women's individual ===
Stage	Venue	1st place, gold medalist(s)	2nd place, silver medalist(s)	3rd place, bronze medalist(s)
1	(Egypt) Cairo	Michelle Gulyás (HUN)	Kim Sun-woo (KOR)	Kerenza Bryson (GBR)
2	(Turkey) Ankara	Kerenza Bryson (GBR)	Seong Seung-min (KOR)	Malak Ismail (EGY)
3	(Hungary) Budapest	Mariya Gnedtchik (ANA)	Seong Seung-min (KOR)	Elena Micheli (ITA)
4	(Bulgaria) Sofia	Blanka Guzi (HUN)	Jessica Varley (GBR)	Malak Ismail (EGY)
5	(Turkey) Ankara	Gintarė Aleksandravičė (LIT)	Mariya Gnedtchik (ANA)	İlke Özyüksel (TUR)

=== Mixed team relay ===
Stage	Venue	1st place, gold medalist(s)	2nd place, silver medalist(s)	3rd place, bronze medalist(s)
1	(Egypt) Cairo	Mexico; Duilio Carrillo; Mariana Arceo	Kazakhstan; Temirlan Abdraimov; Lyudmila Yakovleva	South Korea; Seo Chang-wan; Seong Seung-min
2	(Turkey) Ankara	Kazakhstan; Pavel Ilyashenko; Yelena Potapenko	Egypt; Moutaz Mohamed; Amira Kandil	Italy; Federico Alessandro; Aurora Tognetti
3	(Hungary) Budapest	Mexico; Manuel Padilla; Mayan Oliver	France; Brice Loubet; Louison Cazaly	Hungary; Gergely Regős; Blanka Guzi
4	(Bulgaria) Sofia	Egypt; Mohanad Shaban; Haydy Morsy	China; Bailiang Chen; Yewen Gu	Mexico; Duilio Carrillo; Catherine Mayran Oliver
5	(Turkey) Ankara	Hungary; Balázs Szép; Michelle Gulyás	Egypt; Ahmed Hamed; Salma Abdelmaksoud	South Korea; Jun Woong-tae; Seong Seung-min

== Medal table ==
Rank	Nation	Gold	Silver	Bronze	Total
1	Hungary (HUN)	4	1	1	6
2	Egypt (EGY)	3	5	6	14
3	Mexico (MEX)	2	0	1	3
4	South Korea (KOR)	1	3	2	6
5	France (FRA)	1	2	0	3
6	Great Britain (GBR)	1	1	1	3
7	Authorised Neutral Athletes (ANA)	1	1	0	2
7	Kazakhstan (KAZ)	1	1	0	2
9	Lithuania (LIT)	1	0	0	1
10	China (CHN)	0	1	0	1
11	Italy (ITA)	0	0	2	2
12	Poland (POL)	0	0	1	1
12	Turkey (TUR)	0	0	1	1
Totals (13 entries)		15	15	15	45
