= Emma Whitaker =

British modern pentathlete (born 2001)

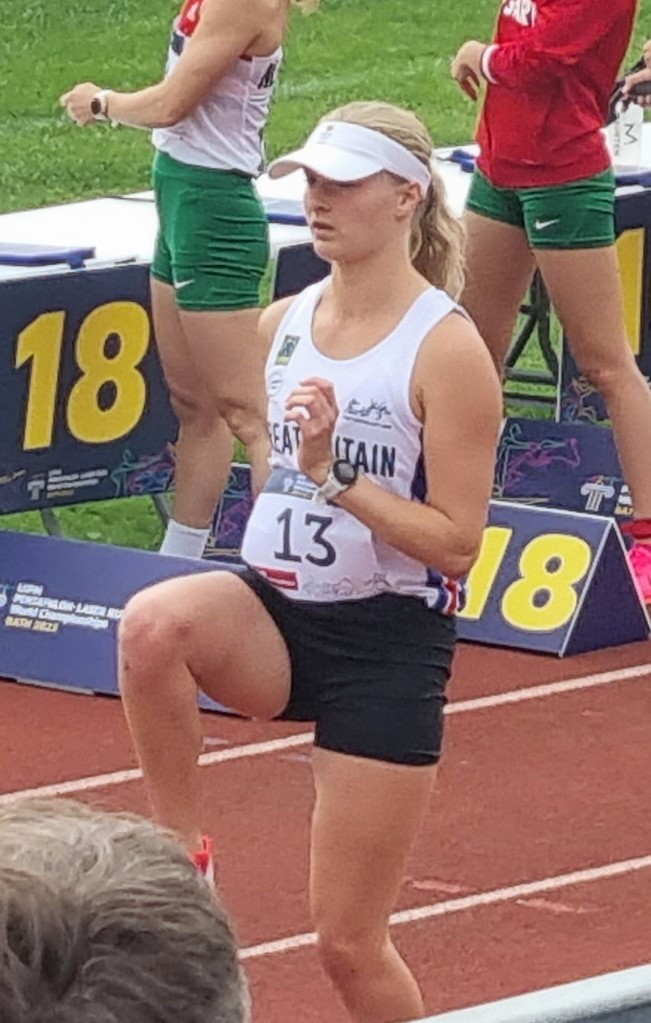
- 2023 World Championships

Personal information
- Nationality: British
- Born: 5 May 2001 (age 25)
- Education: University of Bath

Sport
- Country: Great Britain
- Sport: Modern pentathlon
Medal record
Women's modern pentathlon
Representing Great Britain
World Championships
Silver medal – second place	2025 Kaunas	Team
Bronze medal – third place	2026 Guiyang	Team
European Championships
Gold medal – first place	2024 Budapest	Relay
Silver medal – second place	2024 Budapest	Team
Silver medal – second place	2025 Madrid	Individual
Bronze medal – third place	2024 Budapest	Individual
Bronze medal – third place	2026 Istanbul	Mixed relay
Junior World Championships
Gold medal – first place	2022 Zielona Góra	Mixed relay

Emma Whitaker (born 5 May 2001) is a British modern pentathlete.

== Early life ==
She is from Bolton-le-Sands, Lancashire and was educated at the University of Bath. She had a sporting upbringing and took part in running and horse-riding as a member of Lancaster and Morecambe athletics club and a local the pony club with her sister.

== Career ==
Alongside Charles Brown she won gold at the UIPM 2022 Pentathlon Junior World Championships in the mixed relay in Zielona Góra.

She placed tenth overall at the 2023 World Modern Pentathlon Championships in Bath, England.

She narrowly missed winning a World Cup medal in Sofia, Bulgaria in May 2024 despite starting the final from 16th place following the fencing ranking round.

In March 2025, she won the Indian event at the Viwa Hungarian Indoor Open. Whitaker won the individual silver medal at the 2025 European Modern Pentathlon Championships in Madrid, Spain in July 2025, finishing two seconds behind France’s Rebecca Castaudi. The British team had a fifth place finish.

Alongside Olivia Green and Charlie Follett, she won the team silver medal at the 2025 World Modern Pentathlon Championships in Kaunas, Lithuania.

Alongside Ross Charlton, she won the bronze medal in the mixed relay at the 2026 European Modern Pentathlon Championships in Istanbul.
