= Charlie Follett =

British modern pentathlete (born 1997)

Personal information
- Nationality: British
- Born: 8 April 1997 (age 29)
- Education: University of Bath

Sport
- Country: Great Britain
- Sport: Modern pentathlon
Medal record
Women's modern pentathlon
Representing Great Britain
World Championships
Gold medal – first place	2022 Alexandria	Team
Silver medal – second place	2025 Kaunas	Team
European Championships
Gold medal – first place	2022 Székesfehérvár	Individual
Gold medal – first place	2022 Székesfehérvár	Team
European Junior Championships
Gold medal – first place	2018 El Prat de Llobregat	Relay

Charlie Follett (born 8 April 1997) is a British modern pentathlete.

== Early life ==
From North Somerset, she attended Backwell School. In 2011, she won silver at the British junior modern pentathlon championships. She later attended the University of Bath.

== Career ==
At age 21, Follett finished ninth in the Indian competition at the European Junior Modern Pentathlon Championships in El Prat de Llobregat, in 2018. At the same event, she won the women's relay gold medal with Zoe Davidson. Alongside Davidson, she finished fourth in the relay at the 2019 European Modern Pentathlon Championships.

A fractured kneecap in 2020 caused Follett to miss an entire season. She recovered to win individual and team gold at the 2022 European Modern Pentathlon Championships in Székesfehérvár, Hungary.

She won team gold at the 2022 World Modern Pentathlon Championships in Alexandria, Egypt alongside Olivia Green and Jessica Varley.

Follett was selected for the 2023 European Games in Kraków, but had to withdraw due to injury.
