= 2017 in modern pentathlon =

This article lists the main modern pentathlon events and their results for 2017.

== 2018 YOG qualification events ==
- August 9 – 12: YOG 2018 Continental Qualifier - Europe (Tetrathlon) in (Portugal) Mafra
  - Youth Individual winners: (Italy) Giorgio Malan (m) / (Hungary) Michelle Gulyás (f)
  - Youth Men's Team winners: Italy (Riccardo Testarmata, Stefano Frezza, & Giorgio Malan)
  - Youth Women's Team winners: Italy (Maria Lea Lopez, Alice Rinaudo, & Beatrice Mercuri)
- August 30 – September 3: YOG 2018 Continental Qualifier - Pan America (Tetrathlon) in Mérida
  - Youth Individual winners: (Mexico) Sergio Flores (m) / (Mexico) Melissa Mireles (f)
  - Youth Men's Team winners: Mexico (Sergio Flores, Alexis Vazquez, & Jesus Avalos)
  - Youth Women's Team winners: Mexico (Melissa Mireles, Catherine Mayran Oliver, & Alejandra García)
- September 11 – 17: YOG 2018 Qualifier - Asia / Oceania (Tetrathlon) in (Japan) Gotemba
  - Youth Individual winners: (South Korea) SHIN Hyo-seop (m) / (China) YUAN Xin (f)
  - Youth Men's Team winners: South Korea (SHIN Hyo-seop, KIM Jun-young, & MOON Ju-seong)
  - Youth Women's Team winners: China (YUAN Xin, XIE Linzhi, & GU Yewen)
- December 5 & 6: YOG 2018 Continental Qualifier – Africa (Tetrathlon) in Lagos
  - Youth Individual winners: (South Africa) Rhys Poovan (m) / (South Africa) Alida van der Merwe (f)
  - Youth Men's Team winners: South Africa (Rhys Poovan, Luke Bradley, & Alexander Schliemann)
  - Youth Women's Team winners: Nigeria (Evelyn Nmor, Ayomide Bello, & Happy Kegbe) (default)

== World modern pentathlon championships ==
- July 17 – 24: 2017 World Youth "A" (U19) Modern Pentathlon Championships in (Czech Republic) Prague
  - Youth Individual winners: (South Korea) KIM Woo-cheol (m) / (Russia) Adelina Ibatullina (f)
  - Youth Team Relay winners: Egypt (Ahmed Elgendy & Mohanad Shaban) (m) / Italy (Maria Lea Lopez & Beatrice Mercuri) (f)
  - Youth Mixed Team Relay winners: Italy (Elena Micheli & Giorgio Malan)
  - Youth Men's Team winners: South Korea (KIM Woo-cheol, KANG Seong-hyeon, & KIM Kyoung-hwan)
  - Youth Women's Team winners: Italy (Elena Micheli, Alice Rinaudo, & Beatrice Mercuri)
- August 7 – 14: 2017 World Junior Modern Pentathlon Championships in Székesfehérvár
  - Junior Individual winners: (Italy) Daniele Colasanti (m) / (South Korea) Kim Sun-woo (f)
  - Junior Team Relay winners: South Korea (SO Hyun-seok & SEO Chang-wan) (m) / Hungary (Anna ZS. Toth & Eszter Varga) (f)
  - Junior Mixed Team Relay winners: Russia (Nikolai Matveev & Xeina Fralcova)
  - Junior Men's Team winners: Italy (Gianluca Micozzi, Daniele Colasanti, & Matteo Cicinelli)
  - Junior Women's Team winners: Italy (Elena Micheli, Irene Prampolini, & Aurora Tognetti)
- August 21 – 29: 2017 World Modern Pentathlon Championships in (Egypt) Cairo
  - Individual winners: (South Korea) Jung Jin-hwa (m) / (Russia) Gulnaz Gubaydullina (f)
  - Team Relay winners: South Korea (Jun Woong-tae & Hwang Woo-jin) (m) / Germany (Annika Schleu & Lena Schöneborn) (f)
  - Mixed Team Relay winners: Germany (Ronja Steinborn & Alexander Nobis)
- September 10 – 16: 2017 CISM World Modern Pentathlon Championships in (Poland) Drzonków
  - Individual winners: (Hungary) Ádám Marosi (m) / (Lithuania) Lina Batuleviciute (f)
  - Mixed Team Relay winners: France (Élodie Clouvel & Valentin Belaud)
  - Men's Team winners: Hungary (Ádám Marosi, Soma Tomaschof, & Róbert Kasza)
  - Women's Team winners: Russia (Ekaterina Khuraskina, Sofia Serkina, & Svetlana Lebedeva)

== Continental modern pentathlon championships ==
- June 8 – 11: 2017 Pan American and NORCECA Modern Pentathlon Championships in (Dominican Republic) Santo Domingo
  - Individual winners: (Mexico) Manuel Padilla (m) / (Mexico) Tamara Vega (f)
  - Men's Team winners: Mexico (Manuel Padilla, Melchor Silva, & Alvaro Sandoval)
  - Women's Team winners: Mexico (Tamara Vega, Priscila Espinoza, & Mayan Oliver)
- June 24 – July 1: 2017 European Junior Modern Pentathlon Championships in (Spain) Barcelona
  - Junior Individual winners: (Czech Republic) Marek Grycz (m) / (Italy) Irene Prampolini (f)
  - Junior Team Relay winners: Russia (Ivan Tarasov & Andrei Zuev) (m) / Germany (Rebecca Langrehr & Anna Matthes) (f)
  - Junior Mixed Team Relay winners: France (Lisa Riff & Jean-Baptiste Mourcia)
  - Junior Men's Team winners: Russia (Danila Glavatskikh, Serge Baranov, & Alexander Lifanov)
  - Junior Women's Team winners: Russia (Veronika Efimova, Xeina Fralcova, & Sofia Serkina)
- July 17 – 24: 2017 European Modern Pentathlon Championships in (Belarus) Minsk
  - Individual winners: (Russia) Aleksander Lesun (m) / (Belarus) Anastasiya Prokopenko (f)
  - Team Relay winners: Czech Republic (Ondřej Polívka & Martin Bilko) (m) / Germany (Annika Schleu & Lena Schöneborn) (f)
  - Mixed Team Relay winners: Russia (Kirill Belyakov & Gulnaz Gubaydullina)
- August 30 – September 3: 2017 European Youth "A" (U19) Modern Pentathlon Championships (Tetrathlon) in (Portugal) Caldas da Rainha
  - Youth Individual winners: (France) Jean-Baptiste Mourcia (m) / (Italy) Maria Lea Lopez (f)
  - Youth Mixed Team Relay winners: Italy (Elena Micheli & Giorgio Malan)
  - Youth Men's Team winners: France (Jean-Baptiste Mourcia, Ugo Fleurot, & Xavier Dufour)
  - Youth Women's Team winners: Italy (Maria Lea Lopez, Elena Micheli, & Alice Rinaudo)
- August 30 – September 3: 2017 Pan American Junior Modern Pentathlon Championships in Mérida
  - Junior Individual winners: (Mexico) Emiliano Hernandez (m) / (Argentina) Juliana Borgarucci (f)
  - Junior Men's Team winners: Mexico (Emiliano Hernandez, Damian Garza, & Luis Cruz)
- September 12 – 17: 2017 Asia-Oceania Modern Pentathlon Championships in (Japan) Gotemba
  - Individual winners: (China) LUO Shuai (m) / (Japan) Rena Shimazu (f)
  - Mixed Team Relay winners: South Korea (Kim Sun-woo & Jung Jin-hwa)
  - Men's Team winners: China (LUO Shuai, ZHANG Linbin, & LI Shuhuan)
  - Women's Team winners: China (ZHENG Lishan, WEI Danni, & ZHONG Xiuting)
- October 14 – 20: 2017 European U24 Modern Pentathlon Championships in (Poland) Drzonków
  - U24 Individual winners: (Belarus) Yaraslau Radziuk (m) / (Poland) Natalia Dominiak (f)
  - U24 Mixed Team Relay winners: Hungary (Sarolta Simon & Norbert Horvath)
  - U24 Men's Team winners: Belarus (Yaraslau Radziuk, Pavel Yeusiyevich, & Ivan Ivanov)
  - U24 Women's Team winners: Hungary (Sarolta Simon, Anna ZS. Toth, & Karolina Palkovics)
- December 14 – 18: 2017 South American Modern Pentathlon Championships in (Bolivia) Cochabamba
  - Individual winners: (Chile) Esteban Bustos (m) / (Argentina) Iryna Khokhlova (f)
  - Mixed Team Relay winners: Brazil (William Muinhos & Priscila Oliveira)
  - Men's Team winners: Argentina (Emmanuel Zapata, Leandro Silva, & Sergio Villamayor)
  - Women's Team winners: Argentina (Iryna Khokhlova, Ayelen Zapata, & Pamela Zapata)

== 2017 Modern Pentathlon World Cup ==
- February 20 – 27: MPWC #1 in (United States) Los Angeles
  - Individual winners: (Hungary) Bence Demeter (m) / (Germany) Lena Schöneborn (f)
  - Mixed Team Relay winners: South Korea (Jung Jin-hwa & Yang Soo-jin)
- March 21 – 26: MPWC #2 in (Egypt) Cairo
  - Individual winners: (Ukraine) Pavlo Tymoshchenko (m) / (United Kingdom) Kate French (f)
  - Mixed Team Relay winners: Belarus (Iryna Prasiantsova & Kiril Kasyanik)
- May 3 – 8: MPWC #3 in Kecskemét
  - Individual winners: (France) Valentin Prades (m) / (Lithuania) Laura Asadauskaitė (f)
  - Mixed Team Relay winners: Hungary (Bence Demeter & Sarolta Kovács)
- May 24 – 29: MPWC #4 in (Poland) Drzonków
  - Individual winners: (South Korea) Jun Woong-tae (m) / (Italy) Alice Sotero (f)
  - Mixed Team Relay winners: Ireland (Natalya Coyle & Arthur Lanigan-O'Keeffe)
- June 21 – 25: MPWC #5 (final) in (Lithuania) Vilnius
  - Individual winners: (France) Valentin Prades (m) / (Hungary) Tamara Alekszejev (f)
  - Mixed Team Relay winners: Ireland (Natalya Coyle & Arthur Lanigan-O'Keeffe)
  - Men's Team winners: France (Valentin Prades, Alexandre Henrard, & Valentin Belaud)
  - Women's Team winners: Germany (Annika Schleu, Lena Schöneborn, & Ronja Steinborn)
