= Katharina Jurt =

Swiss modern pentathlete (born 2005)

Personal information
- Nationality: Swiss
- Born: 15 December 2005 (age 20)

Sport
- Country: Switzerland
- Sport: Modern pentathlon
Medal record
Women's modern pentathlon
Representing Switzerland
European Championships
Gold medal – first place	2025 Madrid	Relay
Gold medal – first place	2026 Istanbul	Relay
Silver medal – second place	2026 Istanbul	Team
World Junior Championships
Gold medal – first place	2026 Kaunas	Team
Silver medal – second place	2026 Kaunas	Individual
Silver medal – second place	2026 Kaunas	Relay

Katharina Jurt (born 15 December 2005) is a Swiss modern pentathlete.

== Career ==
From Bern, she is sister of international modern pentathlete Anna Jurt, daughter of marathon runner, Barbara and twin sister of fellow modern pentathlete Florina Jurt.

Katharina won a gold medal in the women’s relay at the UIPM 2023 U19 Pentathlon World Championships, competing alongside her twin sister Florina. She was also a medalist competing individually that year at the UIPM 2023 Laser Run World Championships in Bath, England.

Jurt won gold in the mixed relay laser run, alongside Alexandre Dällenbach, at the 2023 World Modern Pentathlon Championships in Bath, England.

Jurt and her twin sister Florina won the gold medal in the relay at the 2025 European Modern Pentathlon Championships in Madrid.

In July 2026, she was the silver medallist in the individual and gold medalist in the team event at the 2026 World Junior Modern Pentathlon Championships in Kaunas. Competing in August alongside her sister Anna, she won the gold medal in the relay at the 2026 European Modern Pentathlon Championships in Istanbul. Katharina, Anna, and their sister Florina also combined for the team silver medal at the championships.
