= Florina Jurt =

Swiss modern pentathlete (born 2005)

Personal information
- Nationality: Swiss
- Born: 16 December 2005 (age 20)

Sport
- Country: Switzerland
- Sport: Modern pentathlon
Medal record
Women's modern pentathlon
Representing Switzerland
European Championships
Gold medal – first place	2025 Madrid	Relay
Silver medal – second place	2026 Istanbul	Team
World Junior Championships
Gold medal – first place	2026 Kaunas	Team
Silver medal – second place	2026 Kaunas	Relay

Florina Jurt (born 16 December 2005) is a Swiss modern pentathlete.

== Career ==
From Bern, she is sister of international modern pentathlete Anna Jurt, daughter of marathon runner, Barbara and twin sister of fellow modern pentathlete Katharina Jurt. She won a gold medal in the women’s relay at the UIPM 2023 U19 Pentathlon World Championships, competing alongside her twin sister Katharina. She was also a medalist competing individually that year at the UIPM 2023 Laser Run World Championships in Bath, England.

Jurt and her sister Katharina won the gold medal in the relay at the 2025 European Modern Pentathlon Championships in Madrid.

In April 2026, Jurt set a new world record in the Obstacle discipline with a time of 27.68sec at the UIPM 2026 Pentathlon World Cup Cairo. In July 2026, she was a gold medalist in the team event at the 2026 World Junior Modern Pentathlon Championships in Kaunas. Competing in August alongside her sisters Anna and Katharina, she won the silver medal in the team event at the 2026 European Modern Pentathlon Championships in Istanbul.
