= Rebecca Castaudi =

French modern pentathlete (born 2001)

Personal information
- Nationality: French
- Born: 5 July 2001 (age 25) Abidjan, Ivory Coast

Sport
- Sport: Modern pentathlon
Medal record
Women's modern pentathlon
Representing France
European Championships
Gold medal – first place	2025 Madrid	Individual
Silver medal – second place	2025 Madrid	Team
Junior World Championships
Gold medal – first place	2021 Alexandria	Individual
Gold medal – first place	2022 Zielona Góra	Individual
Gold medal – first place	2022 Zielona Góra	Relay

Rebecca Castaudi (born 5 July 2001) is a French modern pentathlete. She won the gold medal at the 2025 European Modern Pentathlon Championships.

== Career ==
She was a member of the CREPS (Centre De Ressources, D'expertise Et De Performance Sportives) in Aix-en-Provence in 2020 before joining her at the French national training centre in Paris a year later.

A two-time individual World Junior Champion in 2021 and 2022, she added a third junior world title by winning the gold medal in the junior women's relay in 2022 alongside Jessye Gomesse. She also made her senior debut in competition in 2022.

Castaudi won the gold medal at the 2025 European Modern Pentathlon Championships finishing ahead of Emma Whitaker of Great Britain and Blanka Bauer of Hungary.

== Personal life ==
Born in Abidjan, she holds French, Italian, and Ivorian citizenship. She started pentathlon in Saint-Denis at the age of nine years-old, where she lived with her parents. She later boarded at a school in Noyon, Oise. She donated shoes to the school after she won the European Championships in 2025. She is member of Bataillon de Joinville. She is dyslexic.
