= 2026 World Junior Modern Pentathlon Championships =

- Location: Kaunas, Lithuania
- Dates: 22–29 July

The 2026 World Junior Modern Pentathlon Championships was held from 22 to 29 July 2026 in Kaunas, Lithuania.

== Medal table ==
* Host nation (Lithuania)

Rank	Nation	Gold	Silver	Bronze	Total
1	Egypt	2	4	5	11
2	Hungary	2	1	1	4
3	Czech Republic	2	0	1	3
4	Switzerland	1	2	0	3
4	Ukraine	1	2	0	3
6	Italy	1	1	0	2
6	Turkey	1	1	0	2
8	France	1	0	2	3
8	Germany	1	0	2	3
10	Poland	1	0	0	1
10	South Africa	1	0	0	1
12	Great Britain	0	2	2	4
13	Lithuania*	0	1	0	1
14	South Korea	0	0	1	1
Totals (14 entries)		14	14	14	42

== Medal summary ==
=== Men's junior modern pentathlon ===
Event	Gold		Silver		Bronze	
Individual	Matteo Bovenzi (ITA)	1608	Danylo Sych (UKR)	1596	Mohamed Hassan (EGY)	1589
Team	Ukraine; Danylo Sych; Oleg Rybak; Maksym Kovalchuk	4626	Egypt; Mohamed Hassan; Omar Amer; Sief Soliman	4672	Czech Republic; Dan Vorlíček; Matěj Kornel; Tobias Raška	4625
Relay	Czech Republic; Matyáš Štegmann; Dan Vorlíček	1483	Ukraine; Oleg Rybak; Danylo Sych	1468	France; Florent Schoen; Étienne Clergeau	1449

=== Women's junior modern pentathlon ===
Event	Gold		Silver		Bronze	
Individual	Małgorzata Karbownik (POL)	1473	Katharina Jurt (SUI)	1465	Ganah El-Gindy (EGY)	1463
Team	Switzerland; Katharina Jurt; Florina Jurt; Vivienne Meyer	4360	Egypt; Zeina Amer; Ganah El-Gindy; Jan Attia	4326	Hungary; Orsolya Varga; Blanka Bauer; Diána Rajncsák	4291
Relay	Egypt; Zeina Amer; Jan Attia	1352	Switzerland; Katharina Jurt; Florina Jurt	1333	France; Coline Flavin; Mathilde Derval	1314

=== Mixed junior modern pentathlon ===
Event	Gold		Silver		Bronze	
Relay	France; Ernest Brugot; Coline Flavin	1410	Lithuania; Liutauras Valeika; Gustė Pečiulytė	1406	Egypt; Mohamed Hassan; Ganah El-Gindy	1396

=== Men's U17 modern pentathlon ===
Event	Gold		Silver		Bronze	
Individual	Benedek Kántor (HUN)	1536	Momen Abdelmgeed (EGY)	1532	Mohamed Abodakika (EGY)	1531
Team	Egypt; Mohamed Mohamed; Momen Abdelmgeed; Mohamed Abodakika	4574	Hungary; Benedek Kántor; Milán Mitró; Botond Birta	4569	Germany; Luis Thieke; Valentin Rovinolo; Leif Rhinow	4552
Relay	Germany; Valentin Rovinolo; Luis Thieke	1378	Italy; Tommaso Tuccime; Riccardo Spagnolini	1373	South Korea; Shin Hyun-kyu; Kim Dong-won	1350

=== Women's U17 modern pentathlon ===
Event	Gold		Silver		Bronze	
Individual	Tatiana Thomatos (RSA)	1463	Tulya Kesebir (TUR)	1461	Jemima Chetwood (GBR)	1432
Team	Hungary; Virág Plébán; Jázmin Balzsay; Gréta Kertai	4262	Great Britain; Jemima Chetwood; Ava Chappell; Cecilia Huepfl	4209	Germany; Charlotte Cuffee; Edda Strauss; Elena Gutierrez Steinhauer	4172
Relay	Turkey; Tuana Özgür; Tulya Kesebir	1249	Egypt; Ghazl Mahmoud; Mariam Abdelnaser	1229	Great Britain; Kiki Fletcher; Ava Chappell	1228

=== Mixed U17 modern pentathlon ===
Event	Gold		Silver		Bronze	
Relay	Czech Republic; Teodor Raška; Klára Josková	1341	Great Britain; Kruze Frampton; Pollyanna Warman	1331	Egypt; Momen Abdelmgeed; Mariam Abdelnaser	1324
