= Jean-Baptiste Mourcia =

French modern pentathlete (born 1999)

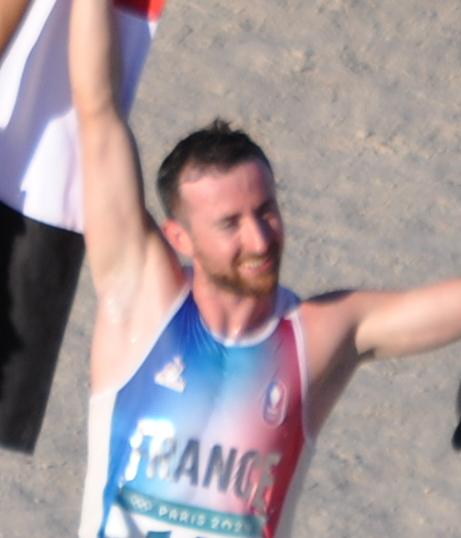
- Mourcia in 2024

Personal information
- Born: 30 September 1999 (age 27) Pertuis, France

Sport
- Country: France
- Sport: Modern pentathlon
Medal record
Men's modern pentathlon
Representing France
European Championships
Silver medal – second place	2025 Madrid	Team
Silver medal – second place	2026 Istanbul	Team
Bronze medal – third place	2022 Székesfehérvár	Relay
Bronze medal – third place	2025 Madrid	Individual

Jean-Baptiste Mourcia (born 30 September 1999) is a French modern pentathlete. He was a bronze medalist at the 2022 European Championships and competed at the 2024 Paris Olympics.

== Early life ==
He competed as a regional level swimmer but discovered modern pentathlon in 2013, at the Aix Université Club.

== Career ==
He became junior world champion in 2019.

He was bronze medalist at the 2022 European Modern Pentathlon Championships in Hungary.

He finished third in the mixed relay legs in Budapest and Sofia during the 2023 Modern Pentathlon World Cup. He also had a fourth place finish at the World Championships in the men's relay with Ugo Fleurot.

He competed at the 2024 Summer Olympics in Paris and qualified for the final.
