= Malak Ismail =

Egyptian modern pentathlete

Personal information
- Nationality: Egyptian
- Born: 9 June 2005 (age 21)

Sport
- Sport: Modern pentathlon
Medal record
Women's modern pentathlon
Representing Egypt
World Championships
Gold medal – first place	2023 Bath	Relay
Silver medal – second place	2024 Zhengzhou	Mixed relay
Bronze medal – third place	2025 Kaunas	Relay
World Relay Championships
Gold medal – first place	2025 Alexandria	Relay

Malak Ismail (born 9 June 2005) is an Egyptian modern pentathlete. She was a gold medalist at the 2023 World Modern Pentathlon Championships and competed at the 2024 Olympic Games.

== Career ==
She was a gold medalist in the relay at the 2023 World Junior Modern Pentathlon Championships alongside Farida Khalil in Druskininkai, Lithuania.

She won gold at the 2023 World Modern Pentathlon Championships in the women's relay alongside Amira Kandil in the women's relay in Bath, England.

In September 2023, at the age of 18, she earned a quota spot for Egypt for the 2024 Olympic Games at the International Modern Pentathlon Union African and Oceania Championships in Cairo.

In April 2024, she finished third at the World Cup event in Ankara. The following month, she also finished third at the World Cup event in Sofia, Bulgaria.

She won a silver medal at the 2024 World Modern Pentathlon Championships in China in the mixed relay alongside Mohamed El-gendy, in June 2024.

She competed at the 2024 Summer Olympics in Paris in August 2024, qualifying for the final.
