= 2022 World Modern Pentathlon Championships =

2022 World Championships
- Location: Alexandria, Egypt
- Dates: 23–31 July
- Competitors: 170 from 35 nations

The 2022 World Modern Pentathlon Championships was held from 23 to 31 July 2022 in Alexandria, Egypt. 170 athletes from 35 countries competed in the championships.

Originally championships were meant to be held in China, but due COVID-19 restriction championships been moved to Egypt.

== Schedule ==
| Date | Round |
|---|---|
| 24 July | Men's Relay |
| 25 July | Women's Relay |
| 26 July | Men's qualification |
| 27 July | Women's qualification |
| 27 July | Men's Fencing Ranking Round |
| 28 July | Men's semi final A |
| 28 July | Men's semi final B |
| 28 July | Women's Fencing Ranking Round |
| 29 July | Women's semi final A |
| 29 July | Women's semi final B |
| 30 July | Men's Final |
| 30 July | Women's Final |
| 31 July | Mixed Relay |

== Medal table ==
* Host nation (Egypt)

| Rank | Nation | Gold | Silver | Bronze | Total |
|---|---|---|---|---|---|
| 1 | South Korea | 2 | 1 | 1 | 4 |
| 2 | Great Britain | 2 | 1 | 0 | 3 |
| 3 | Egypt* | 1 | 2 | 0 | 3 |
| 4 | France | 1 | 0 | 0 | 1 |
| 4 | Italy | 1 | 0 | 0 | 1 |
| 6 | Hungary | 0 | 2 | 2 | 4 |
| 7 | Mexico | 0 | 1 | 0 | 1 |
| 8 | Turkey | 0 | 0 | 2 | 2 |
| 9 | Czech Republic | 0 | 0 | 1 | 1 |
| 9 | Germany | 0 | 0 | 1 | 1 |
| Totals (10 entries) | | 7 | 7 | 7 | 21 |

== Medal summary ==
=== Men ===
| Event | Gold | | Silver | | Bronze | |
|---|---|---|---|---|---|---|
| Individual | Joseph Choong; Great Britain | 1514 | Mohamed Elgendy; Egypt | 1512 | Balázs Szép; Hungary | 1507 |
| Team | France; Christopher Patte; Valentin Prades; Valentin Belaud | 4491 | Hungary; Balázs Szép; Bence Demeter; Csaba Bohm | 4479 | Germany; Marvin Dogue; Pele Uibel; Patrick Dogue | 4417 |
| Relay | South Korea; Jung Jin-hwa; Jun Woong-tae | 1427 | Egypt; Eslam Hamad; Ahmed Hamed | 1419 | Czech Republic; Matouš Tůma; Filip Houška | 1408 |

=== Women ===
| Event | Gold | | Silver | | Bronze | |
|---|---|---|---|---|---|---|
| Individual | Elena Micheli; Italy | 1416 | Michelle Gulyás; Hungary | 1412 | İlke Özyüksel; Turkey | 1405 |
| Team | Great Britain; Charlie Follett; Olivia Green; Jessica Varley | 4161 | South Korea; Kim Sun-woo; Seong Seung-min; Jang Hae-un | 3987 | Hungary; Michelle Gulyás; Sarolta Simon; Blanka Guzi | 3815 |
| Relay | Egypt; Haydy Morsy; Amira Kandil | 1298 | Mexico; Mariana Arceo; Mayan Oliver | 1291 | South Korea; Kim Se-hee; Kim Sun-woo | 1260 |

=== Mixed ===
| Event | Gold | | Silver | | Bronze | |
|---|---|---|---|---|---|---|
| Relay | South Korea; Kim Sun-woo; Jun Woong-tae | 1393 | Great Britain; Joseph Choong; Jessica Varley | 1380 | Turkey; Bugra Ünal; İlke Özyüksel | 1376 |
