= Matěj Lukeš =

Czech modern pentathlete (born 2002)

- Lukeš in 2026

Personal information
- Born: 12 April 2002 (age 24)

Sport
- Sport: Modern pentathlon
Medal record
Men's modern pentathlon
Representing Czech Republic
World Championships
Gold medal – first place	2026 Guiyang	Individual
Silver medal – second place	2025 Alexandria	Men relay
Bronze medal – third place	2025 Kaunas	Individual
Bronze medal – third place	2024 Zhengzhou	Team
European Championships
Bronze medal – third place	2025 Madrid	Team

Matěj Lukeš (born 12 April 2002) is a Czech modern pentathlete. He became world champion at the 2026 World Modern Pentathlon Championships.

== Career ==
He started training in swimming from the age of five years-old and initially competed in triathlon. He started fencing at the age of 15 years-old and began riding horses as a teenager. He trains in athletics at the Stadion Juliska in Prague.

He won the bronze medal in the team event at the 2025 European Modern Pentathlon Championships in Madrid in July 2025, having placed eleventh in the individual competition. He then won the bronze medal the following month in the individual competition at the 2025 World Modern Pentathlon Championships in Kaunas, Lithuania.

Having taken the lead at the top of the world rankings, he won the gold medal in the individual competition at the 2026 World Modern Pentathlon Championships in Guiyang, China, having moving from sixth place to first in the final discipline. In doing so, he became the first Czech male athlete to win the title since 2002, and just the second overall.

== Personal life ==
As of 2026, he is in a relationship with fellow modern pentathlete Laura Heredia.
