= 2023 World Modern Pentathlon Championships =

2023 World Championships
- Venue: National Training Centre; University of Bath
- Location: Bath, Somerset, United Kingdom
- Dates: 19–28 August
- Competitors: Laser run: 560; Pentathlon:196

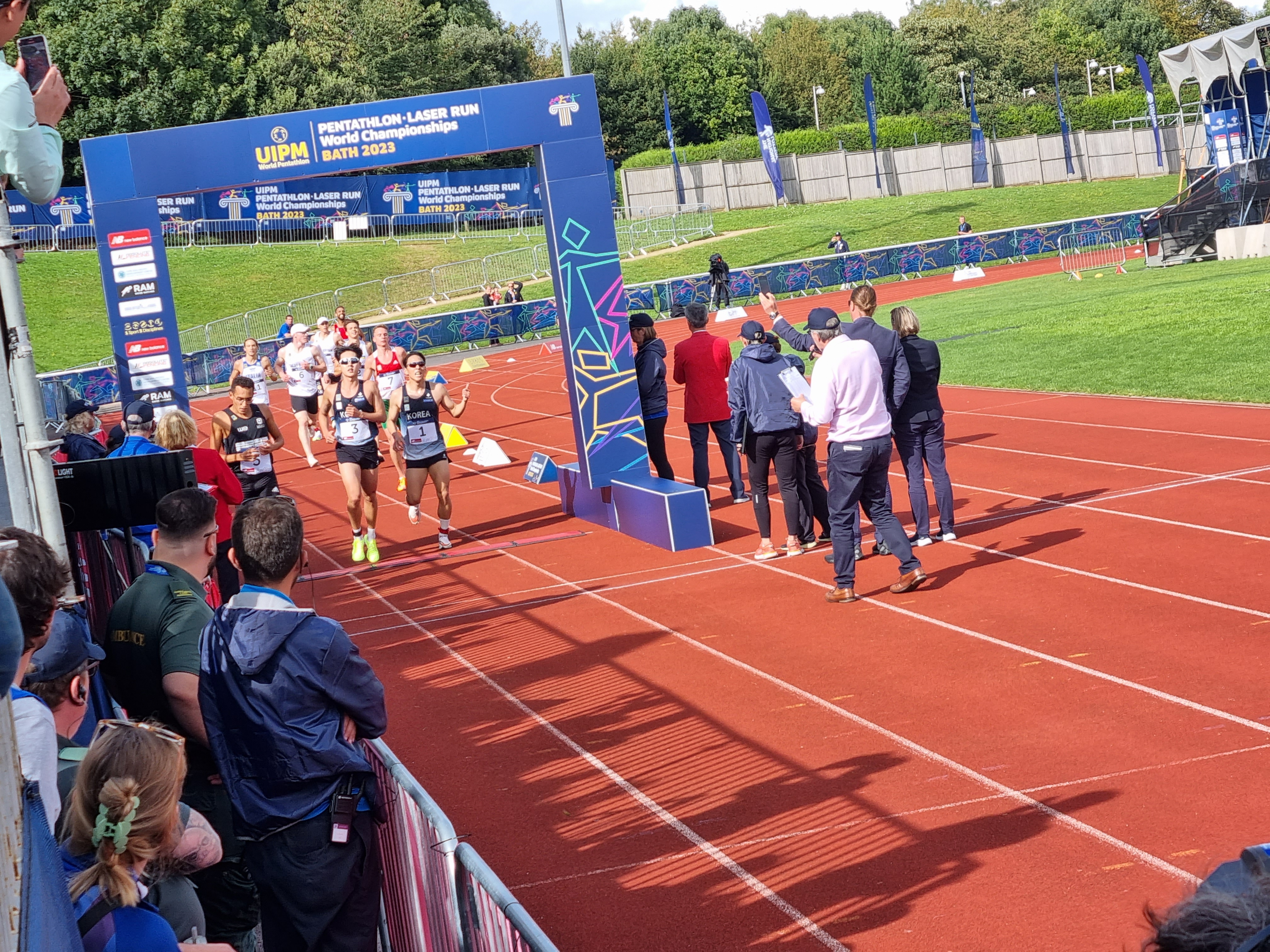
Men's Semi Final B finish

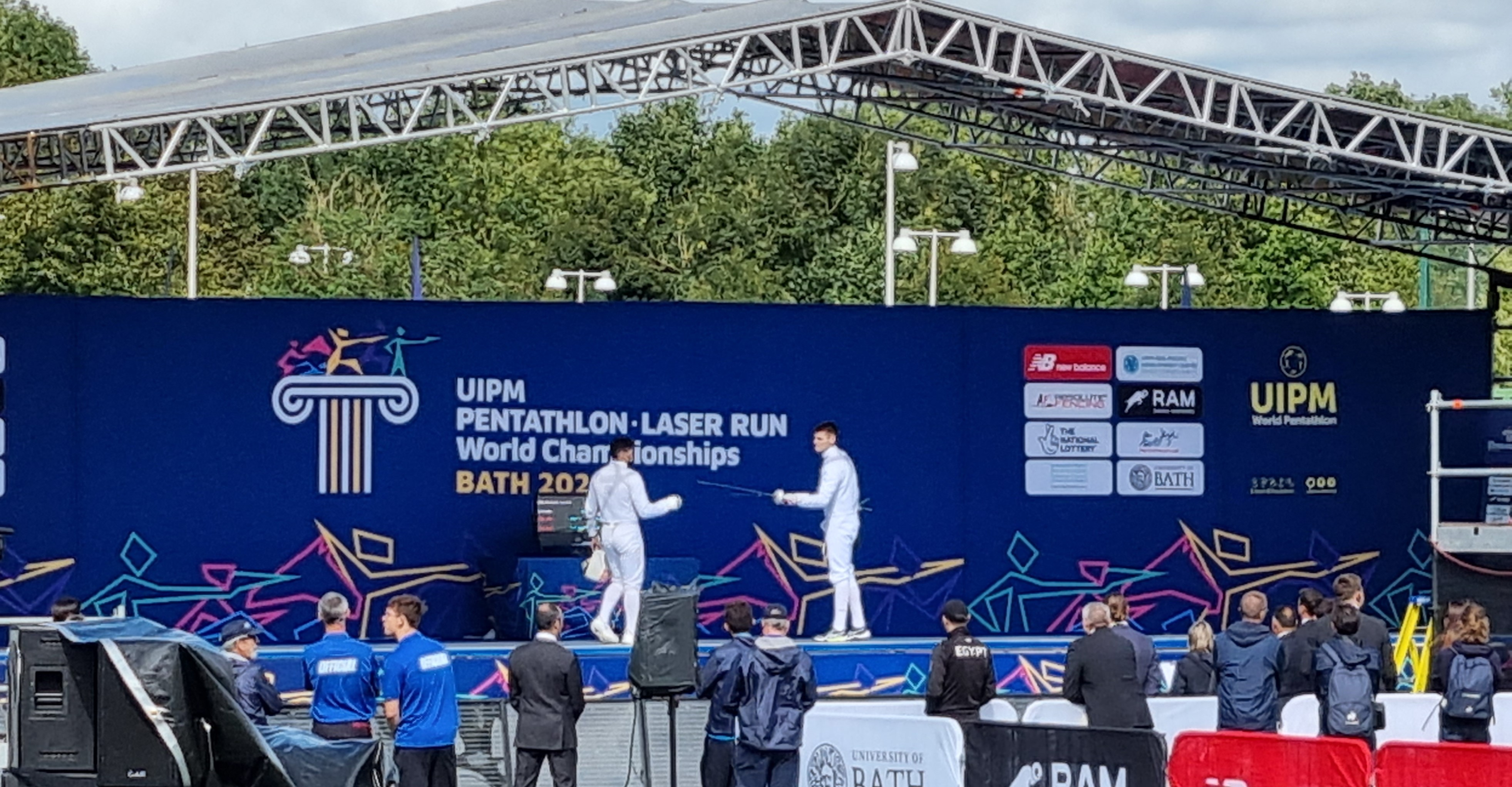
Men's Fencing Hasam Eslam (EGY) vs Titas Puronas (LTU).

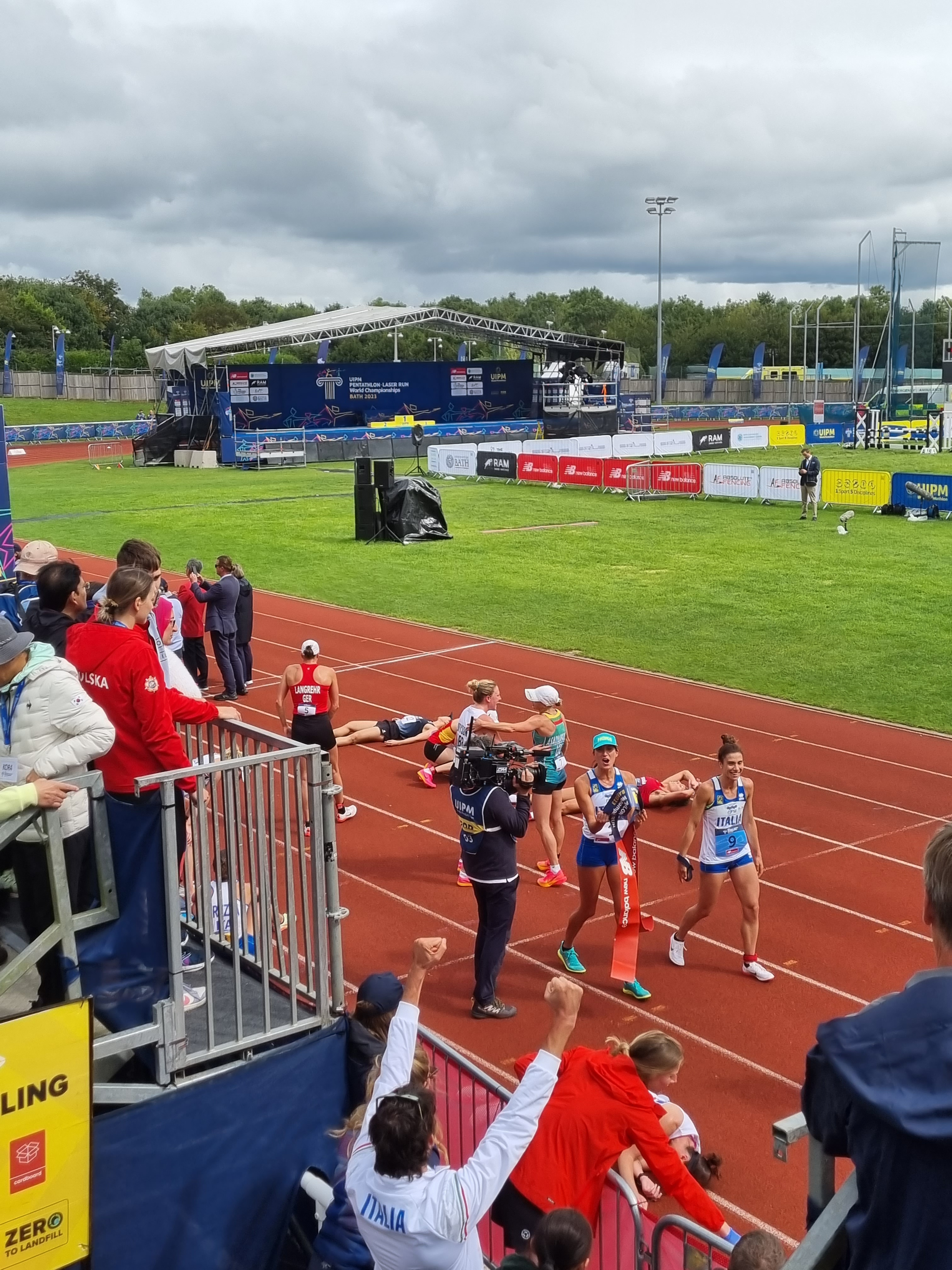
Women's Final finish

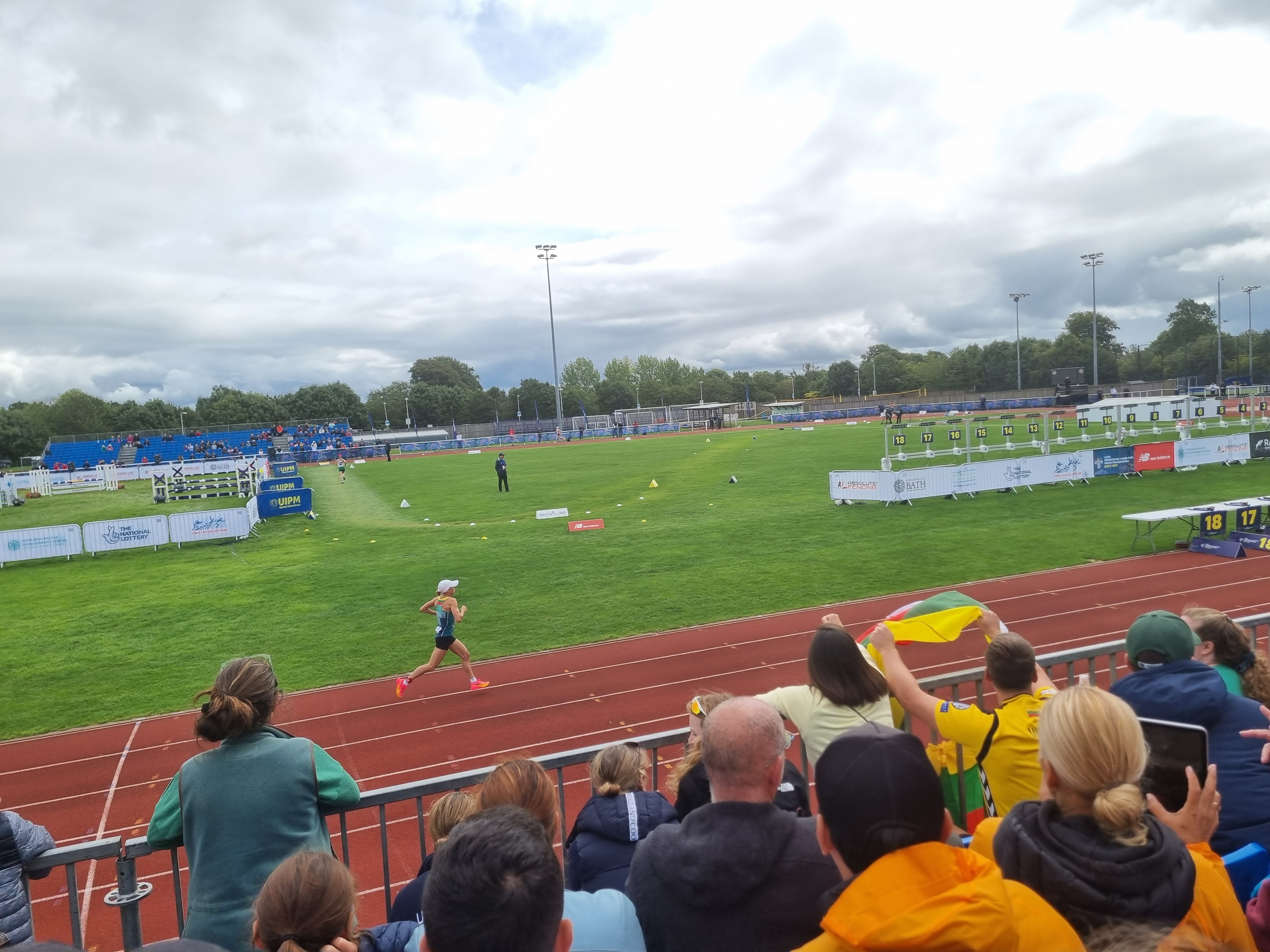
Lithuanian fans supporting Laura Asadauskaitė

The 2023 World Modern Pentathlon Championships were held from 19 to 28 August 2023 in Bath, United Kingdom.

Top 3 finishers in men's and women's pentathlon events qualified for 2024 Summer Olympics.

== Schedule ==
Date	Event
19 August	Women's Laser Run
20 August	Men's Laser Run
21 August	Mixed Laser Run Relay, Para-Laser Run
22 August	Men's Relay, Women's Relay
23 August	Women's Qualification
24 August	Men's Qualification
25 August	Women's Semi-Final
26 August	Men's Semi-Final
27 August	Men's Final, Women's Final
28 August	Mixed Relay

== Medal table ==
* Host nation (Great Britain)

Rank	Nation	Gold	Silver	Bronze	Total
1	Egypt	4	0	1	5
2	Lithuania	3	0	1	4
3	Italy	2	2	0	4
4	Great Britain*	1	2	3	6
5	Switzerland	1	1	0	2
6	Spain	1	0	0	1
7	Mexico	0	2	1	3
8	France	0	2	0	2
9	South Korea	0	1	2	3
10	Hungary	0	1	1	2
11	Canada	0	1	0	1
12	China	0	0	1	1
12	Czech Republic	0	0	1	1
12	Kuwait	0	0	1	1
Totals (14 entries)		12	12	12	36

== Modern Pentathlon ==
=== Men ===
Event	Gold		Silver		Bronze	
Individual	Joseph Choong; Great Britain	1523	Emiliano Hernández; Mexico	1518	Mohanad Shaban; Egypt	1514
Team	Egypt; Ahmed El-Gendy; Mohamed El-Gendy; Mohanad Shaban	4530	Great Britain; Charles Brown; Joseph Choong; Myles Pillage	4450	South Korea; Jun Woong-tae; Jung Jin-hwa; Lee Ji-hun	4450
Relay	Egypt; Ahmed Hamed; Moutaz Mohamed	1467	Hungary; Gergely Regős; Balázs Szép	1463	South Korea; Lee Ji-hun; Seo Chang-wan	1462

=== Women ===
Event	Gold		Silver		Bronze	
Individual	Elena Micheli; Italy	1429	Alice Sotero; Italy	1420	Kerenza Bryson; Great Britain	1419
Team	Italy; Alessandra Frezza; Elena Micheli; Alice Sotero	4221	Great Britain; Kerenza Bryson; Olivia Green; Jessica Varley	4207	Hungary; Luca Barta; Blanka Bauer; Michelle Gulyás	3537
Relay	Egypt; Malak Ismail; Amira Kandil	1315	Italy; Beatrice Mercuri; Aurora Tognetti	1309	Mexico; Mariana Arceo; Mayan Oliver	1290

=== Mixed ===
Event	Gold		Silver		Bronze	
Relay	Egypt; Mohanad Shaban; Salma Abdelmaksoud	1413	South Korea; Jun Woong-tae; Kim Sun-woo	1395	Czech Republic; Marek Grycz; Lucie Hlaváčková	1386

== Laser Run ==
Event	Gold		Silver		Bronze	
Men's individual	Pau Salomo; Spain	10:00.45	Alexandre Dällenbach; Switzerland	10:02.79	Luo Shuai; China	10:07.47
Men's Team	Lithuania; Titas Puronas; Paulius Vagnorius; Danielius Jevensaper	31:45.08	France; Mohamed-Kamis Mtir; William Atger; Audric Lambolez	32:16.12	Great Britain; Alex Bigg; Samuel Curry; Guy Anderson	33:11.56
Women's individual	Elzbieta Adomaitytė; Lithuania	11:39.00	Devan Wiebe; Canada	11:48.20	Alexandra Bousfield; Great Britain	12:05.50
Women's Team	Lithuania; Elzbieta Adomaitytė; Anastasija Chafizova; Neda Doroševaitė	36:58.80	France; Victoria Michon; Marine Bonneaud; Nelly Gaucher	44:04.10	Kuwait; Haya Al-Fares; Qairawan Al-Bathali; Shouq Al-Sabah	49:43.00
Mixed relay	Switzerland; Katharina Jurt; Alexandre Dällenbach	12:14.73	Mexico; Tamara Vega; Lorenzo Macías	12:20.94	Lithuania; Elzbieta Adomaitytė; Titas Puronas	12:27.27

== Participating countries ==
560 laser run athletes from 33 countries and 196 pentathletes from 39 countries competed at the championships.

Country	Men's Laser Run		Men's Pentathlon		Women's Laser run		Women's Pentathlon		Mixed relays	
Country	Elite	Age categories	Ind.	Relay	Elite	Age categories	Ind.	Relay	Laser run	Pentathlon
Afghanistan		X								
Argentina			4				1			
Australia		X			3	X				
Austria		X	1			X				
Bolivia			1				1			X
Brazil			1							
Bulgaria			1							
Canada	1		1		2		2	X		
Chile			2							
China	1		4	X			4	X		X
Chinese Taipei			4	X			3	X		X
Croatia			1							
Czech Republic			4	X	1		3			X
Ecuador			1				1			X
Egypt	1	X	4	X	1	X	4	X		X
Estonia		X	1			X	1			X
France	5	X	4	X	4	X	4			X
Germany	3	X	4	X	2	X	3		X	X
Great Britain	3	X	4	X	3	X	4	X		X
Greece		X			1	X	2			
Guatemala		X								
Hong Kong		X			1	X				
Hungary		X	4	X		X	4	X		X
India	1	X			2	X			X	
Ireland						X	3			
Israel							1			
Italy			4	X			4	X		
Japan			1				2	X		X
Kazakhstan			3	X			1			X
Kuwait	1	X			3				X	
Kyrgyzstan			2	X						
Latvia		X				X				
Lithuania	4		1		3		4		X	
Mexico			4	X			4	X	X	X
Monaco	3	X			1	X			X	
New Zealand		X	1				2			X
Pakistan		X								
Philippines	1	X			1	X			X	
Poland			3				3			X
Portugal	1	X			1	X			X	
Romania		X								
Sierra Leone	3				2					
Singapore			1							
South Africa		X				X				
South Korea		X	4	X			4	X		X
Spain	1	X				X	1			X
Sweden			1				1			
Switzerland	1		1		1		2	X		
Turkey			1				3			X
Ukraine			4	X			1			X
United States			4		2		4	X		X
Uzbekistan							1			
