= 2026 European Modern Pentathlon Championships =

2026 European Championships
- Location: Istanbul, Turkey
- Dates: 3–9 August

The 2026 European Modern Pentathlon Championships was held from 3 to 9 August 2026 in Istanbul, Turkey.

== Medal summary ==
Turkey's İlke Özyüksel won the women's individual title, giving the host nation a gold medal on the final day. Russia's Egor Gromadskii won the men's individual title.

=== Men's events ===
Event	Gold		Silver		Bronze	
Individual	Egor Gromadskii (RUS)	1606	Botond Tamás (HUN)	1599	Giorgio Malan (ITA)	1592
Team	Hungary; Botond Tamás; Balázs Szép; Mihály Koleszár	4733	France; Valentin Belaud; Jean-Baptiste Mourcia; Ugo Fleurot	4705	Ukraine; Maksym Aharushev; Yuriy Kovalchuk; Oleksandr Tovkai	4668
Relay	France; Émilien Maire; Diego Lavillat	1517	Lithuania; Jonas Kalaminskas; Paulius Vagnorius	1499	Czech Republic; Marek Grycz; Matouš Tůma	1489

=== Women's events ===
Event	Gold		Silver		Bronze	
Individual	İlke Özyüksel (TUR)	1493	Anastasiya Arol (BLR)	1488	Blanka Guzi (HUN)	1485
Team	Hungary; Blanka Guzi; Blanka Bauer; Rita Erdős	4360	Switzerland; Katharina Jurt; Anna Jurt; Florina Jurt	4355	Belarus; Anastasiya Arol; Mariya Gnedtchik; Viyaleta Hureyeva	4313
Relay	Switzerland; Katharina Jurt; Anna Jurt	1364	Hungary; Diána Rajncsák; Orsolya Varga	1356	Russia; Viktoriia Sazonova; Amina Tagirova	1332

=== Mixed events ===
Event	Gold		Silver		Bronze	
Relay	Hungary; Mihály Koleszár; Blanka Guzi	1444	Russia; Andrey Bobrov; Yana Soloveva	1442	Great Britain; Ross Charlton; Emma Whitaker	1432

=== Medal table ===
* Host nation (Turkey)

Rank	Nation	Gold	Silver	Bronze	Total
1	Hungary	3	2	1	6
2	Russia	1	1	1	3
3	France	1	1	0	2
3	Switzerland	1	1	0	2
5	Turkey*	1	0	0	1
6	Belarus	0	1	1	2
7	Lithuania	0	1	0	1
8	Czech Republic	0	0	1	1
8	Great Britain	0	0	1	1
8	Italy	0	0	1	1
8	Ukraine	0	0	1	1
Totals (11 entries)		7	7	7	21
