= 2025 European Modern Pentathlon Championships =

2025 European Championships
- Location: Madrid, Spain
- Dates: 21–27 July

The 2025 European Modern Pentathlon Championships was held from 21 to 27 July 2025 in Madrid, Spain. This was the first European championships to include obstacle course in modern pentathlon.

== Medal summary ==
=== Men's events ===
Event	Gold		Silver		Bronze	
Individual	Yuriy Kovalchuk; Ukraine	1588	Mihály Koleszár; Hungary	1582	Jean-Baptiste Mourcia; France	1577
Team	Hungary; Mihály Koleszár; András Gáll; Balázs Szép	4712	France; Jean-Baptiste Mourcia; Ugo Fleurot; Mathis Rochat	4693	Czech Republic; Matěj Lukeš; Marek Grycz; Matouš Tůma	4640
Relay	Czech Republic; Marek Grycz; Matouš Tůma	1631	Ukraine; Yuriy Kovalchuk; Danylo Sych	1620	Spain; Pau Salomó; Iván Liberal	1615

=== Women's events ===
Event	Gold		Silver		Bronze	
Individual	Rebecca Castaudi; France	1481	Emma Whitaker; Great Britain	1479	Blanka Bauer; Hungary	1477
Team	Hungary; Blanka Bauer; Blanka Guzi; Noémi Eszes	4364	France; Rebecca Castaudi; Coline Flavin; Louison Cazaly	4338	Italy; Aurora Tognetti; Alice Rinaudo; Valentina Martinescu	4280
Relay	Switzerland; Florina Jurt; Katharina Jurt	1462	Czech Republic; Kateřina Váňová; Lucie Hlaváčková	1440	Hungary; Noémi Eszes; Emma Mészáros	1428

=== Mixed events ===
Event	Gold		Silver		Bronze	
Relay	Hungary; Blanka Guzi; Mihály Koleszár	1567	Italy; Valentina Martinescu; Matteo Bovenzi	1536	France; Léo Bories; Coline Flavin	1490

=== Medal table ===
* Host nation (Spain)

Rank	Nation	Gold	Silver	Bronze	Total
1	Hungary	3	1	2	6
2	France	1	2	2	5
3	Czech Republic	1	1	1	3
4	Ukraine	1	1	0	2
5	Switzerland	1	0	0	1
6	Italy	0	1	1	2
7	Great Britain	0	1	0	1
8	Spain*	0	0	1	1
Totals (8 entries)		7	7	7	21
