= 2021 European Modern Pentathlon Championships =

2021 European Championships
- Location: Nizhny Novgorod, Russia
- Dates: 5–11 July

The 2021 European Modern Pentathlon Championships were held from 5 to 11 July 2021 in Nizhny Novgorod, Russia.

== Medal summary ==
=== Men's events ===
Event	Gold		Silver		Bronze	
Individual	Bence Kardos; Hungary	1476	Brice Loubet; France	1461	Bence Demeter; Hungary	1456
Team	Hungary; Bence Kardos; Bence Demeter; Richárd Bereczki	4380	France; Brice Loubet; Pierre Dejardin; Christopher Patte	4352	Belarus; Ivan Khamtsou; Yauheni Arol; Artem Evstigneev	4288
Relay	Italy; Giuseppe Mattia Parisi; Roberto Micheli	1495	Belarus; Yaroslav Radziuk; Ilya Palazkov	1485	Russia; Kiril Beliakov; Alexander Lifanov	1476

=== Women's events ===
Event	Gold		Silver		Bronze	
Individual	Ieva Serapinaitė; Lithuania	1376	Blanka Guzi; Hungary	1369	Sarolta Simon; Hungary	1361
Team	Hungary; Blanka Guzi; Sarolta Simon; Kamilla Réti	4010	Russia; Gulnaz Gubaydullina; Adelina Ibatullina; Sophia Kozlova	3900	Italy; Francesca Tognetti; Aurora Tognetti; Irene Prampolini	3845
Relay	Belarus; Volha Silkina; Anastasiya Prokopenko	1430	Poland; Marta Kobecka; Natalia Dominiak	1391	Russia; Uliana Batashova; Anna Buriak	1382

=== Mixed events ===
Event	Gold		Silver		Bronze	
Relay	Russia; Anastasia Chistiakova; Kiril Beliakov	1455	Lithuania; Ieva Serapinaitė; Justinas Kinderis	1436	Italy; Irene Prampolini; Valerio Grasselli	1409

=== Medal table ===
* Host nation (Russia)

Rank	Nation	Gold	Silver	Bronze	Total
1	Hungary	3	1	2	6
2	Russia*	1	1	2	4
3	Belarus	1	1	1	3
4	Lithuania	1	1	0	2
5	Italy	1	0	2	3
6	France	0	2	0	2
7	Poland	0	1	0	1
Totals (7 entries)		7	7	7	21
