= Balázs Szép =

Hungarian modern pentathlete (born 1999)

Personal information
- Born: 18 November 1999 (age 26)

Sport
- Country: Hungary
- Sport: Modern pentathlon
Medal record
Men's modern pentathlon
Representing Hungary
World Championships
Gold medal – first place	2024 Zhengzhou	Team
Silver medal – second place	2024 Zhengzhou	Individual
Silver medal – second place	2023 Bath	Relay
Silver medal – second place	2022 Alexandria	Team
Bronze medal – third place	2022 Alexandria	Individual
European Championships
Gold medal – first place	2022 Székesfehérvár	Team
Gold medal – first place	2025 Madrid	Team
Gold medal – first place	2026 Istanbul	Team
Silver medal – second place	2022 Székesfehérvár	Individual

Balázs Szép (born 18 October 1999) is a Hungarian modern pentathlete.

== Career ==
A member of Újpest Torna Egylet, he began competing internationally for Hungary in 2022. He won bronze in the individual event and silver in the team event at the 2022 World Modern Pentathlon Championships in Alexandria, Egypt. He then won silver in the men's relay at the 2023 World Modern Pentathlon Championships in Bath, England.

He won silver in the men's individual leg of the 2024 Modern Pentathlon World Cup in Budapest in April 2024. Alongside Michelle Gulyas, he won the mixed relay title at the UIPM Modern Pentathlon World Cup Final 2024 in Ankara.

He won silver in the individual and gold in the team event at the 2024 World Modern Pentathlon Championships in June 2024 in Zhengzhou, China. He competed at the 2024 Summer Olympics in 2024.
