= Aurora Tognetti =

Italian modern pentathlete (born 1998)

Personal information
- Born: 16 September 1998 (age 28)

Sport
- Sport: Modern pentathlon
Medal record
Women's modern pentathlon
Representing Italy
World Championships
Gold medal – first place	2025 Kaunas	Team
Silver medal – second place	2023 Bath	Relay
Bronze medal – third place	2025 Kaunas	Individual
European Championships
Bronze medal – third place	2021 Nizhny Novgorod	Team
Bronze medal – third place	2025 Madrid	Team

Aurora Tognetti (born 16 September 1998) is an Italian modern pentathlete.

== Career ==
From Rome, she is a member of Centro Sportivo Carabinieri. Tognetti started training in modern pentathlon at a young age. She won a bronze medal in the mixed relay at the 2014 Summer Youth Olympic Games in Nanjing, China, having been a flag bearer for Italy in the opening ceremony at the Games.

At the 2021 European Modern Pentathlon Championships in Nizhny Novgorod, she won the team bronze with Francesca Tognetti and Irene Prampolini. At the 2023 World Modern Pentathlon Championships she won the relay silver together with Beatrice Mercuri in Bath, England.

In July 2025, she won the team bronze medal at the 2025 European Modern Pentathlon Championships in Madrid, alongside Valentina Martinescu and Alice Rinaudo. The following month, she won the bronze medal in the individual and team gold at the 2025 World Modern Pentathlon Championships in Kaunas, Lithuania.
