= 2018 in modern pentathlon =

This article lists the main modern pentathlon events and their results for 2018.

== Youth Olympic Games ==
- October 11 – 16: Modern pentathlon at the 2018 Summer Youth Olympics
  - Youth Individual winners: (Egypt) Ahmed El-Gendy (m) / (Egypt) Salma Abdelmaksoud (f)
  - Youth Mixed Team Relay winners: (China) GU Yewen & (Egypt) Ahmed El-Gendy

== Other multi-sport events (Modern Pentathlon) ==
- June 6 – 8: 2018 ODESUR Modern Pentathlon Championships in (Bolivia) Cochabamba
  - Individual winners: (Chile) Esteban Bustos (m) / (Argentina) Iryna Khokhlova (f)
  - Mixed Team Relay winners: Brazil (Maria Guimarães Ieda Chaves & Victor Aguiar)
  - Men's Team winners: Argentina (Sergio Villamayor, Emmanuel Zapata, & Leandro Silva)
  - Women's Team winners: Argentina (Iryna Khokhlova, Ayelen Zapata, & Pamela Zapata)
- July 19 – 25: Modern pentathlon at the 2018 Central American and Caribbean Games
  - Individual winners: (Guatemala) Charles Fernandez (m) / (Mexico) Mayan Oliver (f)
  - Team Relay winners: Cuba (Lester Ders & Raidel Orama) (m) / Mexico (Mayan Oliver & Tamara Vega) (f)
  - Mixed Team Relay winners: Guatemala (Charles Fernandez & Sofia Cabrera)
- August 30 – September 2: Modern pentathlon at the 2018 Asian Games
  - Individual winners: (South Korea) Jun Woong-tae (m) / (China) ZHANG Mingyu (f)

== World modern pentathlon championships ==
- April 7 – 16: 2018 World Youth "A" (U19) Modern Pentathlon Championships (Tetrathlon) in (Portugal) Caldas da Rainha
  - Youth Individual winners: (Egypt) Ahmed El-Gendy (m) / (Italy) Alice Rinaudo (f)
  - Youth Team Relay winners: South Korea (MOON Ju-seong & LEE Min-seo) (m) / Italy (Alice Rinaudo & Maria Lea Lopez) (f)
  - Youth Mixed Team Relay winners: Egypt (Salma Abdelmaksoud & Ahmed El-Gendy)
  - Youth Men's Team winners: Egypt (Ahmed El-Gendy, Alyeldin Sewilam, & Mohanad Shaban)
  - Youth Women's Team winners: Italy (Alice Rinaudo, Beatrice Mercuri, & Maria Lea Lopez)
- July 4 – 8: 2018 World University Modern Pentathlon Championships in (Hungary) Budapest
  - Individual winners: (France) Brice Loubet (m) / (Italy) Elena Micheli (f)
  - Mixed Team Relay winners: Poland (Marta Kobecka & Lukasz Gutkowski)
  - Team winners: Egypt (Sherif Rashad, Sherif Nazeir, Haydy Morsy, & Ahmed El-Gendy)
- July 29 – August 6: 2018 World Junior Modern Pentathlon Championships in Kladno
  - Junior Individual winners: (Egypt) Ahmed El-Gendy (m) / (Italy) Elena Micheli (f)
  - Junior Team Relay winners: Czech Republic (Marek Grycz & Martin Vlach) (m) / Guatemala (Sophia Hernandez & Sofia Cabrera) (f)
  - Junior Mixed Team Relay winners: Russia (Kseniia Fraltsova & Serge Baranov)
  - Junior Men's Team winners: Hungary (Bence Kardos, Illés Szabó, & Balint Bernath)
  - Junior Women's Team winners: Italy (Elena Micheli, Maria Lea Lopez, & Aurora Tognetti)
- September 6 – 15: 2018 World Modern Pentathlon Championships in Mexico City
  - Individual winners: (United Kingdom) James Cooke (m) / (Belarus) Anastasiya Prokopenko (f)
  - Team Relay winners: France (Alexandre Henrard & Valentin Belaud) (m) / Belarus (Anastasiya Prokopenko & Iryna Prasiantsova) (f)
  - Mixed Team Relay winners: Germany (Fabian Liebig & Rebecca Langrehr)
  - Men's Team winners: France (Valentin Prades, Valentin Belaud, & Brice Loubet)
  - Women's Team winners: Hungary (Sarolta Kovács, Zsófia Földházi, & Tamara Alekszejev)
- September 25 – 30: 2018 CISM World Modern Pentathlon Championships in (Hungary) Budapest
  - Individual winners: (Germany) Patrick Dogue (m) / (Russia) Ekaterina Khuraskina (f)
  - Mixed Team Relay winners: China (ZHANG Linbin & WANG Wei)
  - Men's Team winners: France (Alexandre Henrard, Valentin Belaud, & Christopher Patte)
  - Women's Team winners: Russia (Ekaterina Khuraskina, Alise Fakhrutdinova, & Gulnaz Gubaydullina)

== Continental modern pentathlon championships ==
- May 24 – 27: 2018 Asia-Oceania U19 Modern Pentathlon Championships (Tetrathlon) in (Thailand) Chonburi
  - U19 Individual winners: (South Korea) MOON Ju-seong (m) / (South Korea) LEE Hwa-young (f)
  - U19 Mixed Team Relay winners: South Korea (LEE Hwa-young & MOON Ju-seong)
  - U19 Men's Team winners: Kazakhstan (Temirlan Abdraimov, Eduard Gerber, & Adil Ibragimov)
  - U19 Women's Team winners: Kazakhstan (Sofya Prizhennikova, Lyudmila Yakovleva, & Darya Kuzmina)
- June 10 – 18: 2018 European U19 Modern Pentathlon Championships (Tetrathlon) in Drzonków
  - U19 Individual winners: (Italy) Giorgio Malan (m) / (Switzerland) Anna Jurt (f)
  - U19 Team Relay winners: Poland (Igor Powroznik & Kamil Kasperczak) (m) / Hungary (Lilla Dallos & Anna Turbucz) (f)
  - U19 Mixed Team Relay winners: Russia (Egor Gromadskii & Iuliia Sergeeva)
  - U19 Men's Team winners: Hungary (Csaba Bohm, József Tamas, & Bálint Katona)
  - U19 Women's Team winners: Italy (Alice Rinaudo, Beatrice Mercuri, & Maria Lea Lopez)
- June 10 – 18: 2018 European U17 Modern Pentathlon Championships in Drzonków
  - U17 Individual winners: (Hungary) Mihály Koleszár (m) / (Poland) Paulina Myrda (f)
  - U17 Team Relay winners: Russia (Ivan Swhalupin & Ilya Gusev) (m) / Poland (Ewa Pydyszewska & Paulina Myrda) (f)
  - U17 Mixed Team Relay winners: Belarus (Maksim Fiadotka & Katsiaryna Etsina)
  - U17 Men's Team winners: Hungary (Mihály Koleszár, András Gáll, & Bence Szakaly)
  - U17 Women's Team winners: Hungary (Lili Basa, Melinda Zóra Deák, & Reka Marschall)
- June 15 – 18: 2018 Pan American U19 Modern Pentathlon Championships (Tetrathlon) in (United States) San Antonio
  - U19 Individual winners: (Mexico) Alexis Vazquez (m) / (Mexico) Catherine Mayran Oliver (f)
  - U19 Men's Team winners: Mexico (Alexis Vazquez, Lorenzo Macias, & Benjamín Gallegos)
  - U19 Women's Team winners: Mexico (Catherine Mayran Oliver, Melissa Mireles, & Itzel Rosales)
- June 17 – 23: 2018 European Junior Modern Pentathlon Championships in (Spain) El Prat de Llobregat
  - Junior Individual winners: (Belarus) Ivan Khamtsou (m) / (Turkey) İlke Özyüksel (f)
  - Junior Team Relay winners: Belarus (Yauheni Arol & Ivan Khamtsou) (m) / Great Britain (Charlie Follett & Zoe Davison) (f)
  - Junior Mixed Team Relay winners: Russia (Serge Baranov & Kseniia Fraltsova)
  - Junior Men's Team winners: Russia (Serge Baranov, Andrei Zuev, & Sergey Kolbasenko)
  - Junior Women's Team winners: Hungary (Blanka Guzi, Michelle Gulyás, & Eszter Kalincsak)
- July 17 – 23: 2018 European Modern Pentathlon Championships in Székesfehérvár
  - Individual winners: (France) Valentin Prades (m) / (France) Marie Oteiza (f)
  - Team Relay winners: France (Brice Loubet & Simon Casse) (m) / Belarus (Iryna Prasiantsova & Volha Silkina) (f)
  - Men's Team winners: France (Valentin Prades, Christopher Patte, & Valentin Belaud)
  - Women's Team winners: Hungary (Tamara Alekszejev, Sarolta Kovács, & Zsófia Földházi)
- September 18 – 23: 2018 European U24 Modern Pentathlon Championships in Drzonków
  - U24 Individual winners: (Poland) Łukasz Gutkowski (m) / (Lithuania) Ieva Serapinaitė (f)
  - U24 Mixed Team Relay winners: Poland (Marta Kobecka & Łukasz Gutkowski)
  - U24 Men's Team winners: Ukraine (Vladyslav Rydvanskyi, Oleksandr Pinchuk, & Oleksandr Tovkai)
  - U24 Women's Team winners: Belarus (Tatsiana Rahachova, Mikhalina Hrynkevich, & Viktoryia Astrouskaya)
- November 27 – December 2: 2018 Pan American Modern Pentathlon Championships in (Peru) Lima
  - Individual winners: (Argentina) Emmanuel Zapata (m) / (Cuba) Leydi Moya (f)
  - Team Relay winners: Brazil (Felipe Nascimento & Danilo Fagundes) (m) / Cuba (Leydi Moya & Eliani Cámara) (f)
  - Mixed Team Relay winners: Cuba (Jose Ricardo Figueroa & Leydi Moya)
  - Men's Team winners: Argentina (Emmanuel Zapata, Vicente Lima, & Leandro Silva)
  - Women's Team winners: Mexico (Mayan Oliver, Tamara Vega, & Priscila Espinoza)

== 2018 Modern Pentathlon World Cup ==
- February 28 – March 4: MPWC #1 in (Egypt) Cairo
  - Individual winners: (France) Christopher Patte (m) / (France) Élodie Clouvel (f)
  - Mixed Team Relay winners: Italy (Gloria Tocchi & Gianluca Micozzi)
- March 27 – 31: MPWC #2 in (United States) Los Angeles
  - Individual winners: (South Korea) LEE Ji-hun (m) / (Russia) Gulnaz Gubaydullina (f)
  - Mixed Team Relay winners: Italy (Alessandra Frezza & Riccardo De Luca)
- May 3 – 7: MPWC #3 in Kecskemét
  - Individual winners: (South Korea) Jun Woong-tae (m) / (Australia) Chloe Esposito (f)
  - Mixed Team Relay winners: Hungary (Bence Demeter & Sarolta Kovács)
- May 23 – 27: MPWC #4 in (Bulgaria) Sofia
  - Individual winners: (Republic of Ireland) Arthur Lanigan-O'Keeffe (m) / (United Kingdom) Kate French (f)
  - Mixed Team Relay winners: Czech Republic (Jan Kuf & Eliska Pribylova)
- June 21 – 24: MPWC #5 (final) in (Kazakhstan) Astana
  - Individual winners: (South Korea) Jung Jin-hwa (m) / (Australia) Chloe Esposito (f)
  - Mixed Team Relay winners: Italy (Alice Sotero & Riccardo De Luca)
