= Brice Loubet =

French modern pentathlete

Personal information
- Nationality: French
- Born: 29 May 1995 (age 31)

Sport
- Country: France
- Sport: Modern pentathlon
Medal record
World Championships
Gold medal – first place	2018 Mexico City	Team
European Championships
Gold medal – first place	2018 Székesfehérvár	Relay
Silver medal – second place	2019 Bath	Team
Silver medal – second place	2021 Nizhny Novgorod	Individual
Silver medal – second place	2021 Nizhny Novgorod	Team
Bronze medal – third place	2017 Minsk	Team

Brice Loubet (born 29 May 1995) is a French modern pentathlete.

He participated at the 2018 World Modern Pentathlon Championships, winning a medal.
