= Olivia Green =

British modern pentathlete (born 1999)

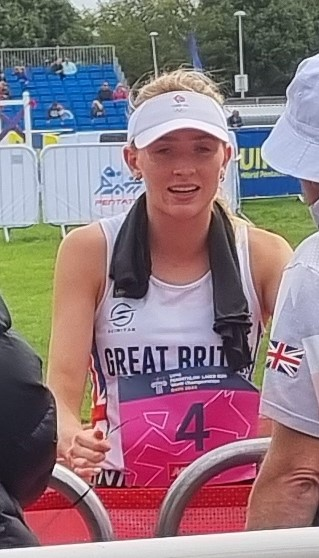
- Olivia Green in 2023

Personal information
- Born: 25 November 1999 (age 26)

Sport
- Country: Great Britain
- Sport: Modern pentathlon
Medal record
Women's modern pentathlon
Representing Great Britain
World Championships
Gold medal – first place	2022 Alexandria	Team
Silver medal – second place	2023 Bath	Team
Silver medal – second place	2025 Kaunas	Team
European Games
Bronze medal – third place	2023 Kraków-Małopolska	Individual
World Junior Championships
Bronze medal – third place	2019 Drzonków	Team
Bronze medal – third place	2019 Drzonków	Mixed relay
European Under-24 Championships
Gold medal – first place	2021 Drzonków	Individual
Gold medal – first place	2021 Drzonków	Team
Bronze medal – third place	2021 Drzonków	Mixed relay
European Junior Championships
Silver medal – second place	2019 Drzonków	Women's relay
Bronze medal – third place	2019 Drzonków	Team

Olivia Green (born 25 November 1999) is a British modern pentathlete. She won an individual bronze medal at the 2023 European Games and was part of the gold medal winning women's team at the 2022 World Modern Pentathlon Championships. Green was also individual European Under-24 champion in 2021.

== Career ==
Having been a part of the Great Britain set-up since she was aged in her early teens and still a pupil at Hulme Grammar School, Green won a silver medal in the women's relay and bronze in the team event at the 2019 European Junior Modern Pentathlon Championships in Drzonków, Poland.

Later that year she returned to the Polish city and claimed bronze in both the team and mixed relay events as well as coming 11th in the individual competition.

Stepping up into senior level, Green made her individual Modern Pentathlon World Cup debut at an event in Budapest, Hungary in March 2021. At the same event she won a gold medal alongside Joe Choong in the mixed relay.

In November 2021, again in Drzonków, Green was on top of the podium as she took gold in both the individual and team contests along with a bronze medal in the mixed relay at the 2021 European Under-24 Modern Pentathlon Championships.

She won a gold medal in the women's team event at the 2022 World Modern Pentathlon Championships in Alexandria, Egypt, as well as placing fifth in the individual standings.

In July 2023, Green won a bronze medal at the European Games in Poland which secured Great Britain a quota place for the 2024 Summer Olympics in Paris.

A month later she won a silver medal in the women's team competition at the 2023 World Modern Pentathlon Championships held in Bath, England.

Despite being responsible for obtaining one of the quota places, Green was not named in the Great Britain team for the Olympics with the places going to defending champion Kate French and 2023 World Championship bronze medalist Kerenza Bryson instead.

At the 2025 World Modern Pentathlon Championships in Kaunas, Lithuania, she finished sixth in the individual event and won a silver medal in the team competition.

== Personal life ==
Green attended the University of Bath receiving a sports scholarship funded by alumni during her studies. She graduated in 2022 with a BSc in Sport and Exercise Science. Green is the girlfriend of 2020 Olympic men's modern pentathlon champion Joe Choong.
