= 2025 World Modern Pentathlon Championships =

Sporting event

UIPM 2025 Pentathlon World Championships
- Venue: Žalgiris Arena
- Location: Kaunas, Lithuania
- Dates: 26–30 August
- Competitors: 166 from 32 nations

Champions
- Men: Moutaz Mohamed; Egypt
- Women: Farida Khalil; Egypt

The 2025 World Modern Pentathlon Championships was held from 26 to 30 August 2025 in Kaunas, Lithuania. This is the first-ever Olympic sport world championship hosted in independent Lithuania, and it is also the first Pentathlon World Championships to be held primarily indoors.

== Format changes ==
This edition is particularly notable as it follows major structural changes to the sport. As of 2025, obstacle course racing has replaced equestrian show jumping, following UIPM’s reform to ensure the modern pentathlon's continued inclusion in the Olympic program. The 2025 championships will thus showcase the fully integrated new format, which includes fencing, obstacle racing, swimming, and laser-run events.

Laser run events and pentathlon relays were excluded from the championships, as these disciplines now have their own separate world championships from 2025.

For the first time, those who finish in the top six in each of the women’s and men’s individual categories at the World Championships will be rewarded with prize money.

== Venue ==
Žalgiris Arena, main venue of the event.

Žalgiris Arena is a main venue for the event. The venue is fully equipped to accommodate all five disciplines: fencing, obstacle racing, swimming, and laser-run—held under one roof—and is capable of seating 12,000–15,000 spectators, featuring state-of-the-art AV technology.

== Schedule ==
The events schedule at the championships will be as follows:

Date	Event
26 August	Men's Qualification
27 August	Women's Qualification; Men's Fencing Round
28 August	Men's Semi-finals; Women's Fencing Round
29 August	Women's Semi-Finals
30 August	Men's Final, Women's Final

== Medal table ==
* Host nation (Lithuania)

Rank	Nation	Gold	Silver	Bronze	Total
1	Egypt	2	0	2	4
2	France	1	1	0	2
3	Italy	1	0	1	2
4	Great Britain	0	1	0	1
4	Hungary	0	1	0	1
4	Ukraine	0	1	0	1
7	Czech Republic	0	0	1	1
Totals (7 entries)		4	4	4	12

== Results ==
=== Men ===
Event	Gold		Silver		Bronze	
Individual	Moutaz Mohamed; Egypt	1579	Mathis Rochat; France	1562	Matěj Lukeš; Czech Republic	1547
Team	France; Mathis Rochat; Ugo Fleurot; Léo Bories	4594	Ukraine; Yuriy Kovalchuk; Danylo Sych; Roman Popov	4573	Egypt; Moutaz Mohamed; Mohanad Shaban; Mohamed Hassan	4559

=== Women ===
Event	Gold		Silver		Bronze	
Individual	Farida Khalil; Egypt	1457	Blanka Guzi; Hungary	1445	Aurora Tognetti; Italy	1432
Team	Italy; Aurora Tognetti; Valentina Martinescu; Maria Beatrice Mercuri	4229	Great Britain; Olivia Green; Emma Whitaker; Charlie Follett	4209	Egypt; Farida Khalil; Malak Ismail; Jana Attia	4198

== Honorary guests ==
- Prince Albert II of Monaco, serving as the Honorary President of the Union Internationale de Pentathlon Moderne (UIPM), is planned to attend final stages of the 2025 World Modern Pentathlon Championships in Kaunas, Lithuania.
- Gitanas Nausėda, the President of the Republic of Lithuania, served as the official patron of the 2025 World Modern Pentathlon Championships held in Kaunas.

== Sustainability ==
Organizers implemented various environmental initiatives include a tree-planting campaign to offset CO₂ emissions, applying circular economy principles (waste reduction, material recycling, avoiding single-use products), and partnering with sustainable vendors.

== Participanting countries ==
Participating nations

A total of 166 competitors from the national teams of the following 32 countries competed

- Argentina (4)
- Austria (2)
- Bulgaria (1)
- Chile (2)
- Czech Republic (7)
- Ecuador (4)
- Egypt (13)
- Estonia (2)
- France (7)
- Georgia (1)
- Germany (10)
- Great Britain (6)
- Guatemala (11)
- Hungary (10)
- Italy (7)
- Japan (1)
- Kazakhstan (1)
- Kuwait (1)
- Lebanon (1)
- Lithuania (13)
- Mexico (11)
- Poland (8)
- Saudi Arabia (2)
- South Africa (2)
- South Korea (6)
- Spain (5)
- Sweden (2)
- Switzerland (4)
- Turkey (2)
- Ukraine (8)
- United States (8)
- Uzbekistan (2)
