= Ahmed El-Gendy =

Egyptian modern pentathlete

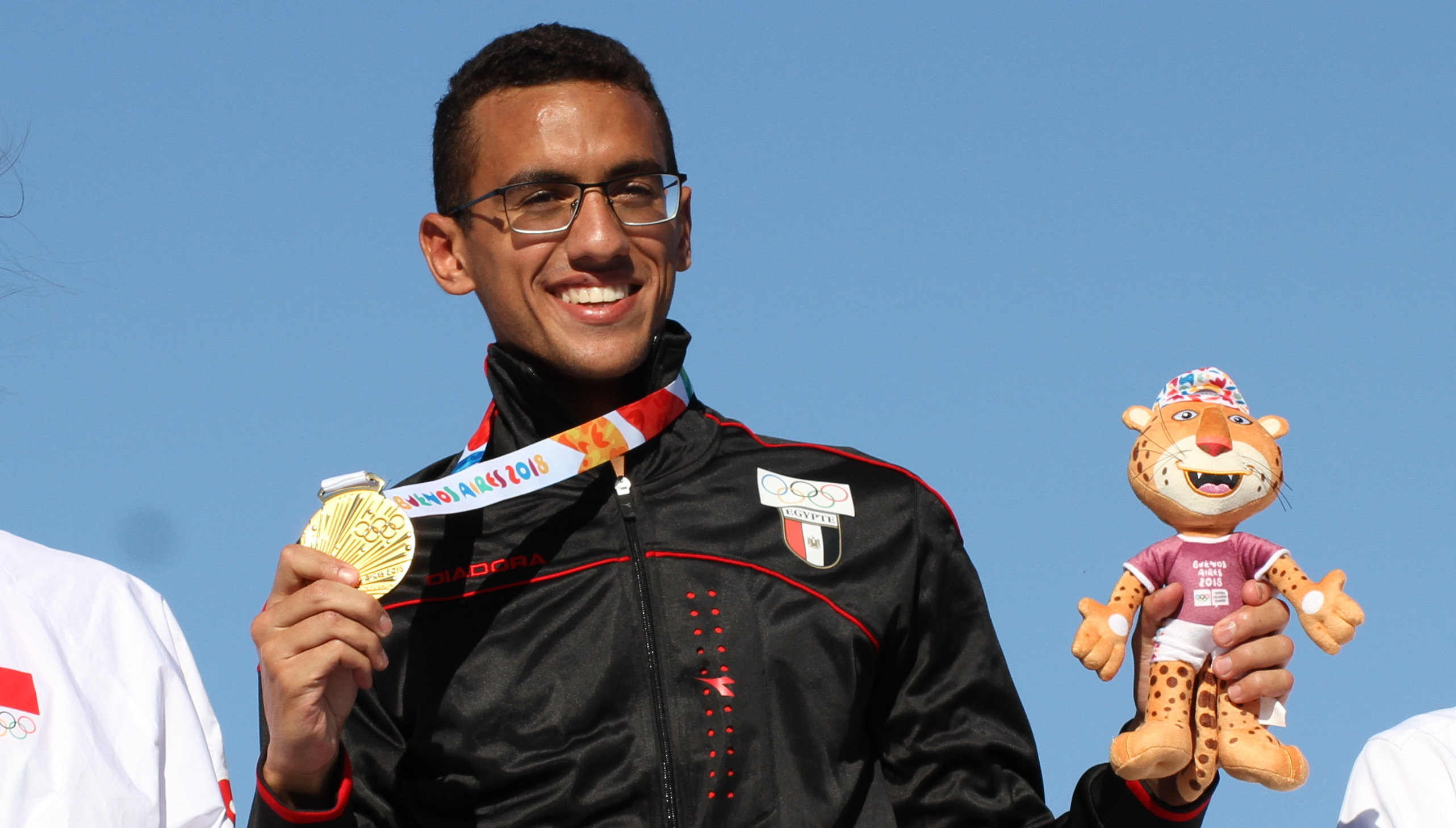
- El-Gendy in 2018

Personal information
- Nationality: Egyptian
- Born: 1 March 2000 (age 26) Cairo, Egypt

Sport
- Sport: Modern pentathlon
Medal record
Men's modern pentathlon
Representing Egypt
Olympic Games
| Gold medal – first place | 2024 Paris | Individual |
| Silver medal – second place | 2020 Tokyo | Individual |
World Championships
| Gold medal – first place | 2023 Bath | Team |
| Bronze medal – third place | 2021 Cairo | Individual |
| Bronze medal – third place | 2021 Cairo | Team |
World Junior Championships
| Gold medal – first place | 2018 Kladno | Individual |
| Silver medal – second place | 2019 Drzonków | Individual |
| Gold medal – first place | 2021 Alexandria | Individual |
Summer Youth Olympics
| Gold medal – first place | 2018 Buenos Aires | Individual |
Mixed modern pentathlon
Representing Mixed-NOCs
Summer Youth Olympics
| Gold medal – first place | 2018 Buenos Aires | Mixed |

Ahmed El-Gendy (Arabic: أحمد الجندي; born 1 March 2000) is an Egyptian modern pentathlete. He won the silver medal in the men's event at the 2020 Summer Olympics. He also competed in the 2018 Summer Youth Olympics and won gold for Egypt. He also won the gold medal for Egypt in the 2024 Summer Olympics breaking both the Olympic and world records with a score of 1555 points. He is the first athlete from Africa to win medals, including an Olympic gold medal, in modern pentathlon.

At the 2020 Summer Olympics, El-Gendy was ranked 13th after the fencing, swimming, and riding events, trailing leader and eventual gold medalist Joe Choong by 50 points, meaning he started the final laser-run 50 seconds after Choong. He made up that entire deficit during the laser-run, and briefly led during the final 800 metres; ultimately he finished second, just under five seconds behind Choong. He was the official flag bearer of his country in Paris 2024 with female weightlifter Sara Ahmed and Fencer Mohamed El-Sayed (fencer). He has also trained in Smouha SC in Alexandria for the Olympics.

Olympic Games
| Preceded by Hedaya Malak; Alaaeldin Abouelkassem | Flagbearer for Egypt (with Sara Ahmed); París 2024 | Succeeded by Incumbent |
