= Anna Jurt =

Swiss modern pentathlete (born 2001)

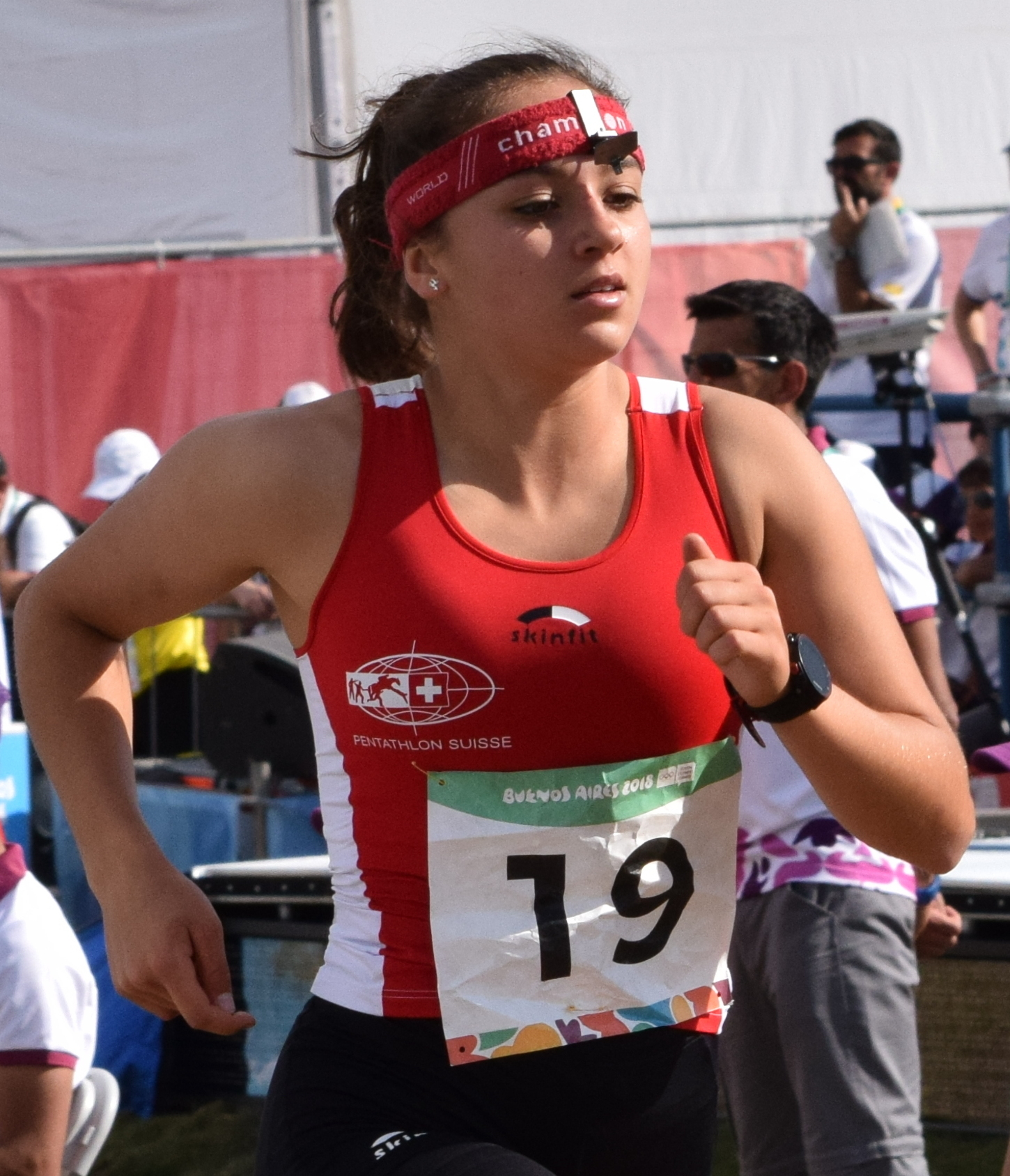

Personal information
- Nationality: Swiss
- Born: 28 December 2001 (age 24)

Sport
- Country: Switzerland
- Sport: Modern pentathlon
Medal record
Women's modern pentathlon
Representing Switzerland
European Championships
Gold medal – first place	2026 Istanbul	Relay
Silver medal – second place	2024 Budapest	Individual
Silver medal – second place	2026 Istanbul	Team

Anna Jurt (born 28 December 2001) is a Swiss modern pentathlete. She won a silver medal at the 2024 European Modern Pentathlon Championships in the individual event held in Budapest, Hungary.
