= Haydy Morsy =

Egyptian modern pentathlete

Haydy Morsy OLY
Personal information
- Nationality: Egyptian
- Born: 20 September 1999 (age 26)

Sport
- Country: Egypt
- Sport: Modern pentathlon
Medal record
Women's modern pentathlon
Representing Egypt
World Championships
Gold medal – first place	2022 Alexandria	Relay
Silver medal – second place	2017 Cairo	Mixed relay
Silver medal – second place	2024 Zhengzhou	Relay

Haydy Adil Muhammad Kamal Morsy (born 20 September 1999) is an Egyptian modern pentathlete. She competed in the 2016 Summer Olympics at the age of 16, finishing in 35th place among the 35-woman field. Morsy won the 2019 African modern pentathlon championship, qualifying for the 2020 Summer Olympics.
