= Blanka Bauer =

Hungarian modern pentathlete (born 2005)

- Bauer in 2023

Personal information
- Born: 18 July 2005 (age 21)

Sport
- Sport: Modern pentathlon
Medal record
Women's modern pentathlon
Representing Hungary
World Championships
Gold medal – first place	2024 Zhengzhou	Team
Gold medal – first place	2025 Kaunas	Team
European Championships
Gold medal – first place	2025 Madrid	Team
Gold medal – first place	2026 Istanbul	Team
Bronze medal – third place	2025 Madrid	Individual

Blanka Bauer (born 18 July 2005) is a Hungarian modern pentathlete.

== Career ==
A member of Újpesti TE, Bauer won the gold medal in the team event at the 2024 World Modern Pentathlon Championships alongside Blanka Guzi and Rita Erdős. She also finished tenth in the individual competition at the Championships in Zhengzhou, China.

The following year, she placed fourth in the individual competition at the 2025 Junior World Championships in Székesfehérvár, Hungary. Bauer won the individual bronze medal and gold in the team event at the 2025 European Modern Pentathlon Championships in Madrid. She won the team gold medal and placed seventeenth in the individual at the 2025 World Modern Pentathlon Championships in Kaunas, Lithuania.

After suffering a lumbar vertebrae injury, she returned to competition in the second half of 2026 having been unable to train for seven months. In July, she came sixth individually at the Junior European Championships in Barcelona, and won a gold medal in the team event with Emma Mészáros and Diána Rajncsáki. Bauer won gold in the team event and placed fourth in the individual at the 2026 European Modern Pentathlon Championships in Istanbul.

== Personal life ==
She is a student at the University of Veterinary Medicine in Budapest.
