= Elena Micheli =

Italian modern pentathlete (born 1999)

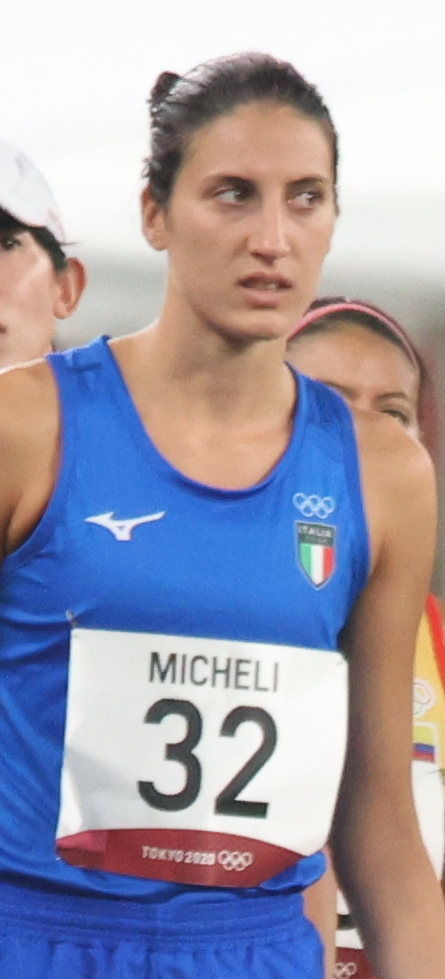
- Elena Micheli at the 2020 Summer Olympic Games

Personal information
- Born: 29 April 1999 (age 27)

Sport
- Country: Italy
- Sport: Modern pentathlon
- Club: C.S. Carabinieri
Medal record
Women's modern pentathlon
Representing Italy
World Championships
Gold medal – first place	2022 Alexandria	Individual
Gold medal – first place	2023 Bath	Individual
Gold medal – first place	2023 Bath	Team
Silver medal – second place	2019 Budapest	Individual
European Championships
Gold medal – first place	2024 Budapest	Team

Elena Micheli (born 29 April 1999) is an Italian modern pentathlete. She won the gold medal in the women's individual event at the World Modern Pentathlon Championships in 2022 and 2023.

== Career ==
Micheli won the gold medal in the women's individual event at the 2022 World Modern Pentathlon Championships held in Alexandria, Egypt. She also won the silver medal in the women's individual event at the 2019 World Modern Pentathlon Championships held in Budapest, Hungary. She represented Italy in the women's event at the 2020 Summer Olympics in Tokyo, Japan.

== Achievements ==
Year	Competition	Venue	Rank	Event	Time	Notes
2021	Olympic Games	(Japan) Tokyo	33rd	Individual	1049 pts	
