= Blanka Guzi =

Hungarian modern pentathlete

- Guzi in 2026

Personal information
- Nationality: Hungarian
- Born: 15 May 1999 (age 27)

Sport
- Country: Hungarian
- Sport: Modern pentathlon
Medal record
Women's modern pentathlon
Representing Hungary
World Championships
Gold medal – first place	2024 Zhengzhou	Team
Gold medal – first place	2026 Guiyang	Individual
Silver medal – second place	2021 Cairo	Team
Silver medal – second place	2024 Zhengzhou	Individual
Silver medal – second place	2025 Kaunas	Individual
Bronze medal – third place	2022 Alexandria	Team
Bronze medal – third place	2026 Guiyang	Mixed relay
World Relay Championships
Silver medal – second place	2025 Alexandria	Relay
European Games
Bronze medal – third place	2023 Kraków-Małopolska	Team
European Championships
Gold medal – first place	2021 Nizhny Novgorod	Team
Gold medal – first place	2025 Madrid	Team
Gold medal – first place	2025 Madrid	Mixed relay
Gold medal – first place	2026 Istanbul	Team
Gold medal – first place	2026 Istanbul	Mixed relay
Silver medal – second place	2021 Nizhny Novgorod	Individual
Bronze medal – third place	2022 Székesfehérvár	Team
Bronze medal – third place	2023 Kraków	Team
Bronze medal – third place	2024 Budapest	Relay
Bronze medal – third place	2026 Istanbul	Individual

Blanka Guzi (born 15 May 1999) is a Hungarian modern pentathlete. She is a three-time medallist in the World Championships team event, as well as a silver medal winner in the individual event.

== Early life ==
From Kistokaj, Guzi went to school in Miskolc. She played Handball before taking up modern pentathlon and became a member of the Miskolc Swimming Pentathlon Club and Herman Ottó Gimnázium. Guzi won individual silver and team gold at her first major international competition, the 2018 Junior European Championships.

== Career ==
Guzi won bronze in the junior competition at the Laser Run World Championships in Dublin in 2018, and won gold at the same event in 2019 in Hungary.

She won silver in the individual and gold in the team event at the 2021 European Modern Pentathlon Championships in Russia. That year, she won silver in the team event at the 2021 World Modern Pentathlon Championships in Cairo.

Guzi was a bronze medalist at the 2022 World Modern Pentathlon Championships in the women's team event in Alexandria, Egypt. That year, she was a medalist at the 2022 European Modern Pentathlon Championships in Hungary.

She won the 2023 Modern Pentathlon World Cup individual event in Budapest. Guzi was a bronze medalist at the 2023 European Games in Kraków in the women's team event.

Guzi had success at the 2024 Modern Pentathlon World Cup, winning a bronze medal in the Mixed team relay alongside Gergely Regős, in Budapest, and gold in the individual in Sofia, Bulgaria.

Guzi won the individual silver medal at the 2025 World Modern Pentathlon Championships in Kaunas, Lithuania.

Guzi won the individual bronze medal and the gold medal in the team event at the 2026 European Modern Pentathlon Championships in Istanbul.

== Personal life ==
In 2023, Guzi moved to Budapest and became a member of Diósgyőri VTK.
