= Jessica Varley =

British modern pentathlete (born 1995)

Jess Varley
Personal information
- Full name: Jessica Varley
- Nationality: British
- Born: 12 March 1995 (age 31)

Sport
- Country: Great Britain
- Sport: Modern pentathlon
Medal record
Women's modern pentathlon
Representing Great Britain
World Championships
Gold medal – first place	2022 Alexandria	Team
Silver medal – second place	2022 Alexandria	Mixed relay
Silver medal – second place	2023 Bath	Team
European Games
Bronze medal – third place	2023 Kraków-Małopolska	Mixed relay

Jessica Varley (born 12 March 1995) is a British modern pentathlete.

== Early life ==
Varley attended Oundle School and trained for the modern pentathlon at the Peterborough Athletic Club, Burghley Pony Club, Stamford Fencing Club and Oundle and District Swimming Club. She later studied at the University of Bath.

== Career ==
Varley won individual gold, team relay silver and mixed relay silver at the Laser Run World Championships in 2018 in Dublin.

She won a silver medal at the 2022 World Cup Final in Ankara. She subsequently rose to a world ranking of four. She won team gold and mixed relay silver, alongside Joe Choong at the 2022 World Modern Pentathlon Championships in Alexandria, Egypt.

She was a bronze medalist in the Mixed relay at the 2023 European Games alongside Sam Curry, in Kraków. She was a silver medalist in the team competition at the 2023 World Modern Pentathlon Championships in Bath, England.

Varley suffered a fractured spine after a horse riding accident in 2023. She recovered to win a World Cup silver medal in Sofia, Bulgaria in May 2024.
