= İlke Özyüksel =

Turkish modern pentathlete (born 1997)

İlke Özyüksel OLY
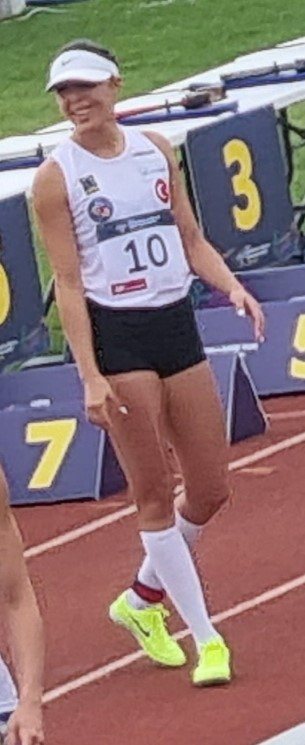
- Özyüksel in 2023

Personal information
- Full name: İlke Özyüksel Mihrioğlu
- Nationality: Turkish
- Born: 26 February 1997 (age 29) Ankara, Turkey
- Education: Ankara University
- Height: 1.67 m (5 ft 6 in)
- Weight: 53 kg (117 lb)

Sport
- Country: Turkey
- Sport: Modern Pentathlon
- Club: Altınordu S.K.
Medal record
Women's modern pentathlon
Representing Turkey
World Championships
Bronze medal – third place	2022 Alexandria	Individual
Bronze medal – third place	2022 Alexandria	Mixed relay
UIPM World Cup
Silver medal – second place	2019 Székesfehérvár	Individual
Bronze medal – third place	2018 Cairo	Individual
Bronze medal – third place	2017 Drzonków	Individual
Bronze medal – third place	2017 Cairo	Individual
European Championships
Gold medal – first place	2026 Istanbul	Individual
Bronze medal – third place	2017 Minsk	Individual
Bronze medal – third place	2016 Sofia	Individual
European Junior Championships
Gold medal – first place	2018 El Prat de Llobregat	Individual
Bronze medal – third place	2017 Barcelona	Individual
Silver medal – second place	2016 Drzonków	Individual
UIPM Youth "A" World Championships
Gold medal – first place	2015 Buenos Aires	Individual
European Youth "B" Championships
Gold medal – first place	2013 Minsk	Individual
Silver medal – second place	2012 Warsaw	Individual

İlke Özyüksel Mihrioğlu (born 26 February 1997) is a Turkish Olympian modern pentathlete. She won the bronze medal in the women's individual event at the 2022 World Modern Pentathlon Championships held in Alexandria, Egypt.

== Personal life ==
İlke Özyüksel was born to a retired worker father and a school counselor mother in Ankara on 26 February 1997. Her mother had lost her sight at the age of 15 due to ocular hypertension. Despite her visual impairment, she finished her higher education as the highest-ranked student.

İlke became very sick two weeks after her birth. In the beginning, it was thought that she had cancer. However, a Turkish physician working in the United States, who was in Turkey for a three-day conference, diagnosed her with Infantile hemangioma, which can be fatal if not treated. She underwent a laser therapy, and could get her health again. She was operated five times on vascular disease.

She graduated from Ankara University's Department of Physical Education.

Her father died from cancer by mid 2019.

== Sports career ==
At the age of only nine, Özyüksel became champion at the World Championships for Cadets. In 2014, she decided to quit pentathlon upon suggestions of her coach. However, the Federation insisted in her career, and sent her for training to Hungary, where she stayed eleven months. After she broke a world record there, she became unwelcome by the Hungarian coach, and had to return home ahead of schedule. After her return, the Federation set up a 10-member team including a psychologist, a dietitian, a masseur and a physician, to prepare her for the Olympics. She trained eight hours a day for four and half months.

She won the gold medal at the UIPM 2015 Youth "A" World Championships held in Buenos Aires, Argentina. At the same competition, she set two world records for youth, in overall with 1,065 points and in combined with a time of 11:55.00 and 585 points. She earned a quota spot at the 2016 Summer Olympics in Rio de Janeiro, Brazil. She is the first ever Olympic modern pentathlon participant from Turkey. At the 2017 European Championships in Minsk, Belarus, she took the bronze medal. In the Stage 4 of 2017 World Cup held in Drzonków, Poland, she won the bronze medal, and set a world record for juniors in combined with a time of 11:57.53 and 583 points. Özyüksel captured the gold medal at the 2018 Modern Pentathlon Junior European Championships held in El Prat de Llobregat, Spain. She broke the world record with a total of 1,376 points competing in the five events of fencing, swimming, riding and shootin events. She set world records in the running and the shooting events at the 2019 European Modern Pentathlon Championships held in Bath, United Kingdom.

In 2019, she received the "Mustafa V. Koç Sports Award" worth of ₺ 250,000 (approx. USD 47,000). The prize was established jointly by the Koç Holding and the Turkish Olympic Committee in commemoration of the late Mustafa Vehbi Koç (1960–2016).

A short movie focusing on her life and career named 'Ilke' is released in 2019.

Özyüksel participated at the Tokyo Olympics and finished fifth.

She is a member of Altınordu Sports Club.

She captured the gold medal in the individual event at the 2026 European Modern Pentathlon Championships in Istanbul, Turkey.

== Records ==
World Records
Event	Record	Competition	Location	Date
Overall	1,065 points	UIPM Youth "A" World Championships Final	(Argentina) Buenos Aires	31 August 2015
Combined	11:55.00; 585 points	UIPM Youth "A" World Championships Final	(Argentina) Buenos Aires	31 August 2015
Combined	11:57.53; 583 points	2017 World Cup Stage 4 Final	(Poland) Drzonków	28 May 2017

== Results ==
=== Olympic Games ===
Rank Event Year Location Result

5 Women's Individual Pentathlon 2021 Tokyo, JPN 1350 pts

34 Women's Individual Pentathlon 2016 Rio de Janeiro, BRA 978 pts

Youth Olympic Games

Rank Event Year Location Result

5 Women's Individual Pentathlon 2014 Nanjing, CHN 1024 pts

=== UIPM World Championships ===
Rank Event Year Location Result

3 Women's Individual Pentathlon 2022 Alexandria, EGY 1405 pts

6 Women's Individual Pentathlon 2024 Zhengzhou, CHN 1396 pts

7 Women's Individual Pentathlon 2023 Bath, GBR 1400 pts

10 Women's Individual Pentathlon 2019 Budapest, HUN 1317 pts

10 Women's Individual Pentathlon 2018 Mexico City, MEX 1297 pts

10 Women's Individual Pentathlon 2017 Cairo, EGY 1249 pts

30 Women's Individual Pentathlon 2021 Cairo, EGY 1229 pts

32 Women's Individual Pentathlon 2015 Berlin, GER 966 pts

35 Women's Individual Pentathlon 2016 Moscow, RUS 984 pts

=== World Cup Final ===
Rank Event Year Location Result

2 Women's Individual Pentathlon 2023 Ankara, TUR 1374 pts

3 Women's Individual Pentathlon 2024 Ankara, TUR 1400 pts

11 Women's Individual Pentathlon 2022 Ankara, TUR 1341 pts

17 Women's Individual Pentathlon 2019 Tokyo, JPN 1300 pts

19 Women's Individual Pentathlon 2016 Sarasota, FL, USA 1278 pts

22 Women's Individual Pentathlon 2021 Szekesfehervar, HUN 1322 pts

35 Women's Individual Pentathlon 2018 Astana, KAZ 454 pts

=== World Cup ===
Rank Event Year Location Result

2 Women's Individual Pentathlon 2019 Szekesfehervar, HUN 1394 pts

2 Women's Individual Pentathlon 2017 Cairo, EGY 1326 pts

3 Women's Individual Pentathlon 2022 Albena, BUL 1385 pts

3 Women's Individual Pentathlon 2018 Cairo, EGY 1325 pts

3 Women's Individual Pentathlon 2017 Drzonkow, POL 1341 pts

4 Women's Individual Pentathlon 2020 Cairo, EGY 1342 pts

5 Women's Individual Pentathlon 2024 Budapest, HUN 1401 pts

5 Women's Individual Pentathlon 2016 Rio de Janeiro, BRA 1307 pts

6 Women's Individual Pentathlon 2022 Ankara, TUR 1360 pts

6 Women's Individual Pentathlon 2018 Sofia, BUL 1336 pts

6 Women's Individual Pentathlon 2017 Los Angeles, CA, USA 1307 pts

8 Women's Individual Pentathlon 2023 Budapest, HUN 1393 pts

8 Women's Individual Pentathlon 2021 Sofia, BUL 1330 pts

10 Women's Individual Pentathlon 2024 Cairo, EGY 1378 pts

10 Women's Individual Pentathlon 2019 Prague, CZE 1339 pts

12 Women's Individual Pentathlon 2016 Rome, ITA 1332 pts

13 Women's Individual Pentathlon 2018 Los Angeles, CA, USA 1291 pts

13 Women's Individual Pentathlon 2017 Kecskemet, HUN 1295 pts

16 Women's Individual Pentathlon 2021 Budapest, HUN 1313 pts

21 Women's Individual Pentathlon 2019 Sofia, BUL 1276 pts

23 Women's Individual Pentathlon 2019 Cairo, EGY 1270 pts

28 Women's Individual Pentathlon 2016 Cairo, EGY 1245 pts

33 Women's Individual Pentathlon 2015 Kecskemet, HUN 988 pts

34 Women's Individual Pentathlon 2015 Cairo, EGY 973 pts

36 Women's Individual Pentathlon 2021 Sofia, BUL 707 pts

=== World Cup - Best Achievement ===
Year Individual

2024 1 x 5th

2023 1 x 8th

2022 1 x 3rd

2021 1 x 8th

2020 1 x 4th

2019 1 x 2nd

2018 1 x 3rd

2017 1 x 2nd

2016 1 x 5th

2015 1 x 33rd

Note:Results in Non-Olympic events are not included in the above section.

=== Award ===
Giants of Sports Awards Athlete of the Year (2020).

Mustafa Vehbi Koc Sports Award (2019).

=== Family ===
Husband, Harun Mihrioglu.

=== Education ===
Physical Education at Ankara University (TUR) and International Relations at Anadolu University (TUR). She has also received a Master's degree in Sport Management from Gazi University (TUR).

=== Occupation ===
Athlete, teacher.

=== Club ===
She is a member of Istanbul Karaburun Su ve Doğa SK. In fencing, she is coached by her spouse Harun Mihrioğlu.
