= Mohanad Shaban =

Egyptian modern pentathlete

Personal information
- Nationality: Egyptian
- Born: 2 July 2000 (age 26)

Sport
- Sport: Modern pentathlon
Medal record
Men's modern pentathlon
Representing Egypt
World Championships
Gold medal – first place	2023 Bath	Team
Gold medal – first place	2023 Bath	Mixed relay
Silver medal – second place	2026 Guiyang	Team
Bronze medal – third place	2023 Bath	Individual
Bronze medal – third place	2025 Kaunas	Team
World Relay Championships
Gold medal – first place	2025 Alexandria	Mixed relay
World Junior Championships
Gold medal – first place	2019 Drzonków	Relay

Mohanad Shaban (born 2 July 2000) is an Egyptian modern pentathlete. He won the 2023 Modern Pentathlon World Cup Final and qualified for 2024 Summer Olympics.
