= Drzonków =

- District of Zielona Góra
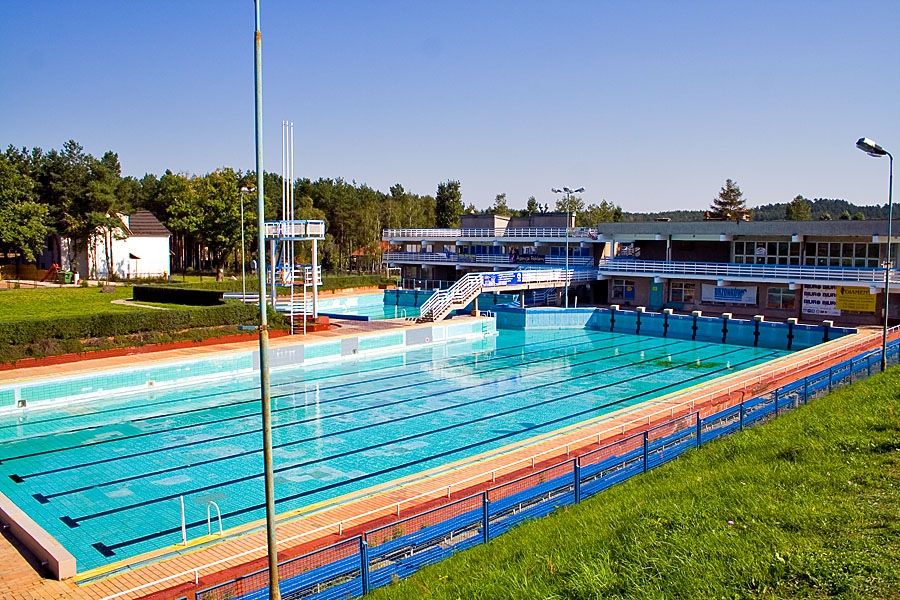
- Swimming pool in Drzonków

- Location within Poland Location within Lubusz Voivodeship
- Coordinates: 51°53′N 15°34′E
- Country: Poland
- Voivodeship: Lubusz
- County/City: Zielona Góra

Population
  - Total: 1,484
- Time zone: UTC+1 (CET)
  - Summer (DST): UTC+2 (CEST)
- Postal code: 66-004
- Website: http://www.drzonkow.net

Drzonków [ˈdʐɔnkuf] is a district of the city of Zielona Góra, in western Poland, located in the southeastern part of the city. It was a separate village until 2014.

Drzonków has a population of 1,484.
