= Michelle Gulyás =

Hungarian modern pentathlete (born 2000)

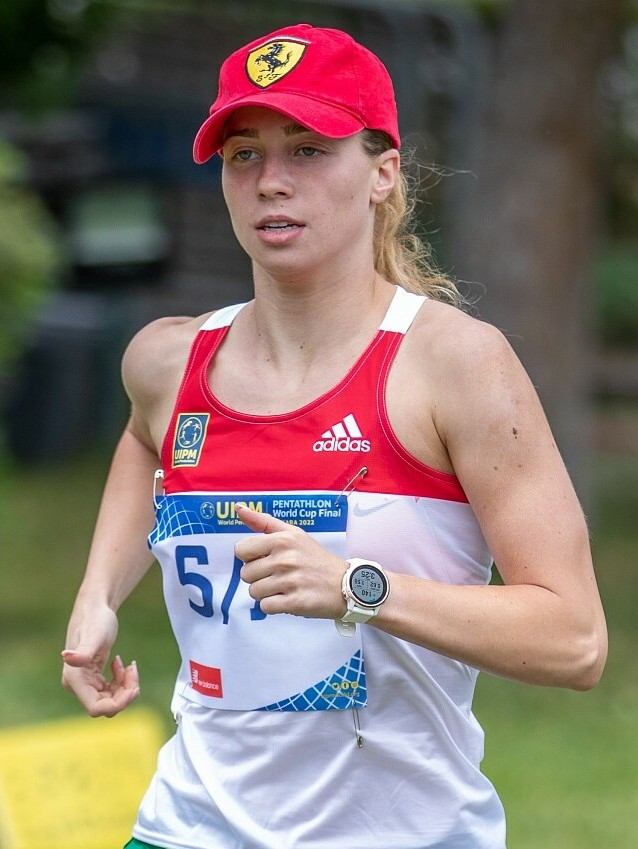
- Gulyás at the 2022 Modern Pentathlon World Cup Final

Personal information
- Nationality: Hungarian
- Born: 24 October 2000 (age 25) London, United Kingdom

Sport
- Country: Hungary
- Sport: Modern pentathlon
- Club: KSI (–2020); UTE (2020–)
Medal record
Women's modern pentathlon
Representing Hungary
Olympic Games
Gold medal – first place	2024 Paris	Individual
World Championships
Silver medal – second place	2018 Mexico City	Mixed relay
Silver medal – second place	2021 Cairo	Team
Silver medal – second place	2022 Alexandria	Individual
Bronze medal – third place	2021 Cairo	Individual
Bronze medal – third place	2022 Alexandria	Team
Bronze medal – third place	2023 Bath	Team
European Games
Bronze medal – third place	2023 Kraków-Małopolska	Team
European Championships
Silver medal – second place	2022 Székesfehérvár	Individual
Bronze medal – third place	2022 Székesfehérvár	Team
Bronze medal – third place	2023 Kraków	Team
Summer Youth Olympics
Bronze medal – third place	2018 Buenos Aires	Individual
World Junior Championships
Bronze medal – third place	2018 Kladno	Team
European Junior Championships
Gold medal – first place	2018 El Prat de Llobregat	Team

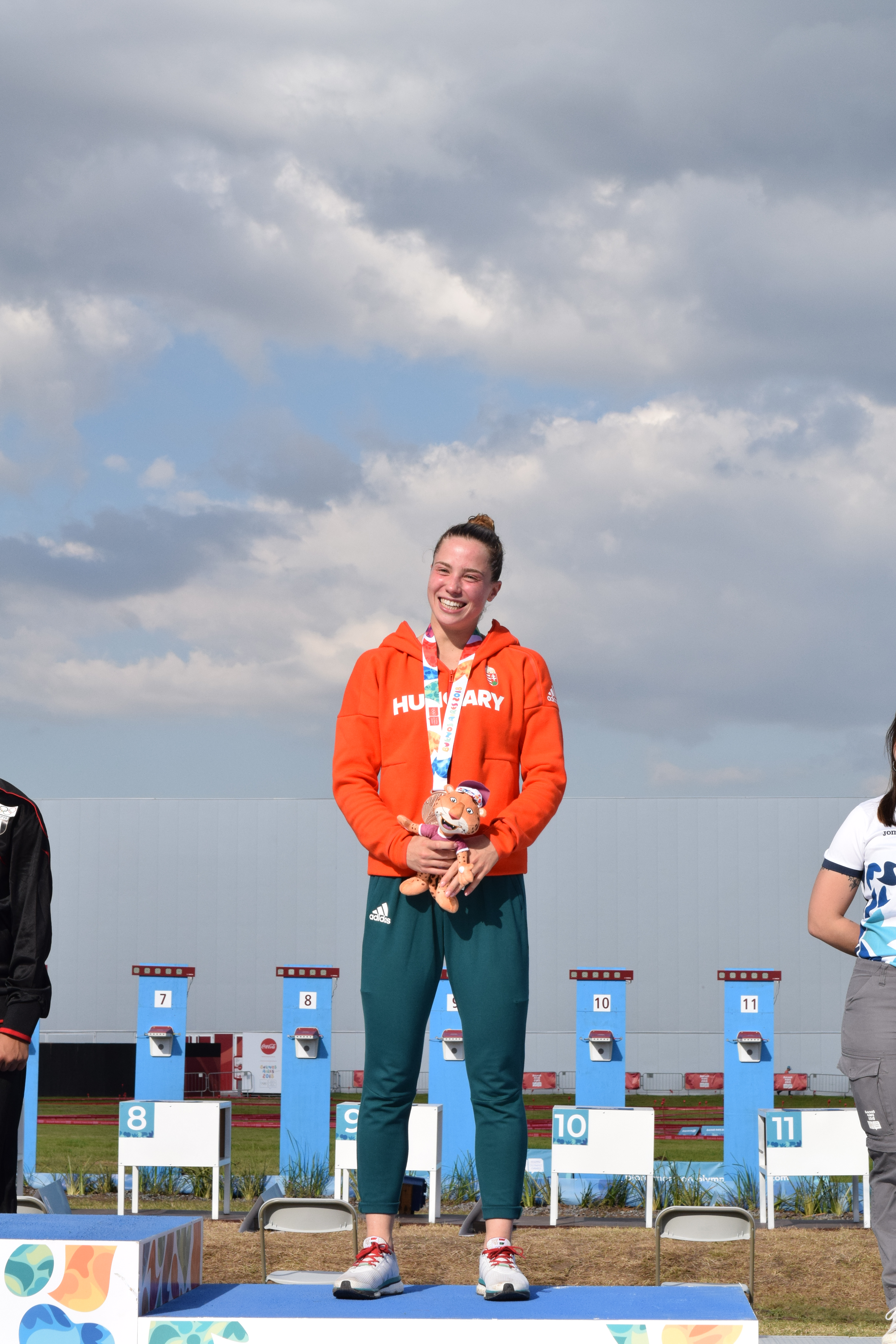
Gulyás at the 2018 Summer Youth Olympics

Michelle Gulyás (born 24 October 2000) is a Hungarian modern pentathlete and a criminal detective of the Hungarian Police. She won the women's event at the 2024 Summer Olympics, setting a new world record with 1461 points.

She participated at the 2018 World Modern Pentathlon Championships, winning a silver medal in the mixed relay.

At the 2021 World Modern Pentathlon Championships, she won two medals, one bronze in the individual, and one silver in the team competition.

She won the silver medal in the women's individual event at the 2022 World Modern Pentathlon Championships held in Alexandria, Egypt.

== Achievements ==
Year	Competition	Venue	Rank	Event	Time	Notes
Representing Hungary
2021	World Championships	(Egypt) Cairo	3rd	Individual	1339 pts	
2021	Olympic Games	(Japan) Tokyo	12th	Individual	1049 pts	
2022	World Championships	(Egypt) Alexandria	2nd	Individual	1412 pts	
2022	European Championships	(Hungary) Székesfehérvár	3rd	Individual	1383 pts	
2023	European Games	(Poland) Kraków	7th	Individual	1415 pts	
2023	World Championships	(United Kingdom) Bath	18th	Individual	1097 pts	
2024	World Championships	(China) Zhengzhou	18th	Individual	1130 pts	
2024	Olympic Games	(France) Paris	1st	Individual	1461 pts	WR OR
