= Modern pentathlon at the 2024 Summer Olympics – Qualification =

This article details the qualifying phase for modern pentathlon at the 2024 Summer Olympics. Thirty-six athletes for each gender must qualify for the Games, with only a maximum of two each per National Olympic Committee (NOC). Qualification methods are similarly applied to both men's and women's events.

The host nation France has been guaranteed one quota place automatically, while two invitational positions are distributed by the UIPM once the rest of the qualifiers are announced and thereby decided.

One place will be awarded to the winner of the 2023 UIPM World Cup final. Twenty places are determined by the continental championships: one each from Africa and Oceania, five from Asia, eight from Europe, and five from the Americas with a maximum of one quota per NOC (two winners each from NORCECA and South America, and the highest-ranked from the 2023 Pan American Games).

Three places have been reserved for the highest-ranked modern pentathletes at the 2023 and 2024 UIPM World Championships, respectively. The remaining six will be awarded based on the UIPM World Rankings of June 17, 2024, unless a reallocation of unused berths has been invoked before the deadline.

== Qualification summary ==
NOC	Men	Women	Total
Argentina	1	0	1
Australia	0	1	1
Brazil	0	1	1
Bulgaria	1	0	1
Chile	1	0	1
China	2	1	3
Cuba	1	0	1
Czech Republic	2	2	4
Ecuador	1	1	2
Egypt	2	2	4
France	2	2	4
Germany	2	2	4
Great Britain	2	2	4
Guatemala	1	1	2
Hungary	2	2	4
Italy	2	2	4
Japan	1	1	2
Kazakhstan	1	1	2
Latvia	1	0	1
Lithuania	0	2	2
Mexico	2	2	4
Poland	2	2	4
South Korea	2	2	4
Spain	0	1	1
Sweden	0	1	1
Switzerland	1	1	2
Thailand	1	0	1
Turkey	1	1	2
Ukraine	2	1	3
United States	0	1	1
Uzbekistan	0	1	1
Total: 31 NOCs	36	36	72

== Men's events ==
Event	Date	Venue	Places	Qualified modern pentathlete
2023 UIPM World Cup Final	May 31 – June 4, 2023	(Turkey) Antalya	1	Mohanad Shaban (EGY)
2023 European Games	June 25 – July 1, 2023	(Poland) Kraków	8	Giorgio Malan (ITA); Joe Choong (GBR); Csaba Böhm (HUN); Valentin Prades (FRA); Marvin Dogue (GER); Łukasz Gutkowski (POL); Oleksandr Tovkai (UKR); Alexandre Dallenbach (SUI)
2023 UIPM World Championships	August 21–28, 2023	(United Kingdom) Bath	1	Emiliano Hernández (MEX)
2023 African & Oceania Championships	August 30 – September 1, 2023	(Egypt) Cairo	1	Ahmed El-Gendy (EGY)
2023 African & Oceania Championships	August 30 – September 1, 2023	(Egypt) Cairo	1	~~Rhys Lanskey (AUS)~~
2022 Asian Games	September 20–24, 2023	(China) Hangzhou	5	Jun Woong-tae (KOR); Li Shuhuan (CHN); Taishu Sato (JPN); Georgiy Boroda-Dudochkin (KAZ); Phurit Yohuang (THA)
2023 Pan American Games	October 21–27, 2023	(Chile) Santiago	1	Duilio Carrillo (MEX)
2023 Pan American Games	October 21–27, 2023	(Chile) Santiago	2	Marcos Rojas Jiménez (CUB); Andrés Fernández (GUA)
2023 Pan American Games	October 21–27, 2023	(Chile) Santiago	2	Andrés Torres (ECU); Franco Serrano (ARG)
2024 UIPM World Championships	June 9–16, 2024	(China) Zhengzhou	1	Balázs Szép (HUN)
2024 UIPM World Rankings	June 17, 2024	—	12	Seo Chang-wan (KOR); Kamil Kasperczak (POL); Jean-Baptiste Mourcia (FRA); Luo Shuai (CHN); Charlie Brown (GBR); Martin Vlach (CZE); Matteo Cicinelli (ITA); Fabian Liebig (GER); Marek Grycz (CZE); Todor Mihalev (BUL); Buğra Ünal (TUR); Vladyslav Chekan (UKR)
Re-allocation of unused Universality Places		—	2	Esteban Bustos (CHI); Pāvels Švecovs (LAT)
Total			36	

== Women's events ==
Event	Date	Venue	Places	Qualified modern pentathlete
2023 UIPM World Cup Final	May 31 – June 4, 2023	(Turkey) Antalya	1	Elena Micheli (ITA)
2023 European Games	June 25 – July 1, 2023	(Poland) Kraków	8	Alice Sotero (ITA); Laura Heredia (ESP); ~~Olivia Green (GBR)~~; Laura Asadauskaitė (LTU); Marie Oteiza (FRA); Michelle Gulyás (HUN); Annika Schleu (GER); Lucie Hlaváčková (CZE)
2023 UIPM World Championships	August 21–28, 2023	(United Kingdom) Bath	1	Kerenza Bryson (GBR)
2023 African & Oceania Championships	August 30 – September 1, 2023	(Egypt) Cairo	1	Malak Ismail (EGY)
2023 African & Oceania Championships	August 30 – September 1, 2023	(Egypt) Cairo	1	Genevieve van Rensburg (AUS)
2022 Asian Games	September 20–24, 2023	(China) Hangzhou	5	Zhang Mingyu (CHN); Kim Sun-woo (KOR); Misaki Uchida (JPN); Yelena Potapenko (KAZ); Alise Fakhrutdinova (UZB)
2023 Pan American Games	October 21–27, 2023	(Chile) Santiago	1	Mayan Oliver (MEX)
2023 Pan American Games	October 21–27, 2023	(Chile) Santiago	2	Sophia Hernández (GUA); Jessica Davis (USA)
2023 Pan American Games	October 21–27, 2023	(Chile) Santiago	2	Isabela Abreu (BRA); Sol Naranjo (ECU)
2024 UIPM World Championships	June 9–16, 2024	(China) Zhengzhou	2	Seong Seung-min (KOR); Blanka Guzi (HUN)
2024 UIPM World Rankings	June 17, 2024	—	11	İlke Özyüksel (TUR); Salma Abdelmaksoud (EGY); Gintarė Venčkauskaitė (LTU); Élodie Clouvel (FRA); Kate French (GBR); Mariana Arceo (MEX); Marlena Jawaid (SWE); Anna Maliszewska (POL); Valeriya Permykina (UKR); Rebecca Langrehr (GER); Natalia Dominiak (POL)
Re-allocation of unused Universality Places	—	—	2	Veronika Novotná (CZE); Anna Jurt (SUI)
Total			36	
