= Modern pentathlon at the 2020 Summer Olympics – Qualification =

This article details the qualifying phase for modern pentathlon at the 2020 Summer Olympics (postponed to 2021 due to the COVID-19 pandemic). Thirty-six athletes per male and female gender must qualify for the Games, with only a maximum of two each per NOC. Qualification methods are similarly applied to both men's and women's events.

Host nation Japan has been guaranteed one quota place automatically, while two invitational positions are distributed by the UIPM once the rest of the qualifiers are announced and thereby decided.

The initial distribution of berths to the athletes based on competition results occur between February and September 2019. One place will be handily awarded to the winner of the 2019 UIPM World Cup final. Twenty places are determined by the continental championships: one each from Africa and Oceania, five from Asia, eight from Europe, and five from the Americas with a maximum of one quota per NOC (two winners each from NORCECA and South America, and the highest-ranked from the 2019 Pan American Games in Lima, Peru).

Three places have been reserved to the highest-ranked athletes at each of the 2019 and 2020 UIPM World Championships. The remaining six will be awarded based on the pentathlon's world rankings, unless a reallocation of unused berths have been invoked before the deadline.

== Qualification summary ==
NOC	Men	Women	Total
Argentina	1		1
Australia	1	1	2
Austria	1		1
Belarus	1	2	3
Brazil		1	1
Chile	1		1
China	2	2	4
Cuba	1	1	2
Czech Republic	2		2
Ecuador		1	1
Egypt	2	2	4
France	2	2	4
Germany	2	2	4
Great Britain	2	2	4
Guatemala	1		1
Hungary	2	2	4
Ireland		1	1
Italy		2	2
Japan	1	2	3
Kazakhstan	1	1	2
Latvia	1		1
Lithuania	1	2	3
Mexico	2	2	4
Poland	2	1	3
ROC	1	2	3
South Korea	2	2	4
Spain	1		1
Turkey		1	1
Ukraine	1		1
United States	1	1	2
Uzbekistan	1	1	2
Total: 31 NOCs	36	36	72

== Men's ==
Individual athletes may qualify in any of the following methods, ensuring that an NOC may enter up to a maximum of two in each event. If more than two athletes are eligible to compete, a non-selected quota has been redistributed.

Event	Date	Venue	Places	Qualified athletes
2019 UIPM World Cup Final	27–30 June 2019	(Japan) Tokyo	1	Joe Choong (GBR)
African Championships	23 February 2019	(Egypt) Cairo	0	~~Sherif Nazeir (EGY)~~
2019 Pan American Games	July 27–30, 2019	(Peru) Lima	2	Charles Fernández (GUA); Lester Ders (CUB)
2019 Pan American Games	July 27–30, 2019	(Peru) Lima	2	Esteban Bustos (CHI); Sergio Villamayor (ARG)
2019 Pan American Games	July 27–30, 2019	(Peru) Lima	1	Amro El-Geziry (USA)
European Championships	August 6–11, 2019	(United Kingdom) Bath	7	Jamie Cooke (GBR); Valentin Prades (FRA); Martin Vlach (CZE); Łukasz Gutkowski (POL); ~~Bence Demeter (HUN)~~; Justinas Kinderis (LTU); Alexander Lifanov (ROC); Patrick Dogue (GER)
2019 UIPM World Championships	3–9 September 2019	(Hungary) Budapest	2	Valentin Belaud (FRA); Jun Woong-tae (KOR)
Asia & Oceania Championships	11–21 November 2019	(China) Kunming	4	~~Lee Ji-hun (KOR)~~; Luo Shuai (CHN); Pavel Ilyashenko (KAZ); Shohei Iwamoto (JPN); Alexander Savkin (UZB)
Asia & Oceania Championships	11–21 November 2019	(China) Kunming	1	Edward Fernon (AUS)
2021 UIPM World Championships	8–14 June 2021	(Egypt) Cairo	2	Ádám Marosi (HUN); Ahmed El-Gendy (EGY)
Pentathlon World Ranking	14 June 2021	—	8	Fabian Liebig (GER); Ilya Palazkov (BLR); Pavlo Tymoshchenko (UKR); Jan Kuf (CZE); Sebastian Stasiak (POL); Aleix Heredia (ESP); ~~Zhang Linbin (CHN)~~; Pāvels Švecovs (LAT); ~~Arthur Lanigan-O'Keeffe (IRL)~~; Alvaro Sandoval (MEX)
Reallocation (World Ranking)	—	—	6	Ahmed Hamed (EGY); Jung Jin-hwa (KOR); Róbert Kasza (HUN); Li Shuhan (CHN); Gustav Gustenau (AUT); Duilio Carrillo (MEX)
Total			36	

== Women's ==
Individual athletes may qualify in any of the following methods, ensuring that an NOC may enter up to a maximum of two in each event. If more than two athletes are eligible to compete, a non-selected quota has been redistributed.

Event	Date	Venue	Places	Qualified athletes
2019 UIPM World Cup Final	27–30 June 2019	(Japan) Tokyo	1	Laura Asadauskaitė (LTU)
African Championships	23 February 2019	(Egypt) Cairo	1	Haydy Morsy (EGY)
2019 Pan American Games	July 27–30, 2019	(Peru) Lima	2	Mariana Arceo (MEX); Samantha Achterberg (USA)
2019 Pan American Games	July 27–30, 2019	(Peru) Lima	2	Maria Ieda Guimarães (BRA); Marcela Cuaspud (ECU)
2019 Pan American Games	July 27–30, 2019	(Peru) Lima	1	Leydi Moya (CUB)
European Championships	August 6–11, 2019	(United Kingdom) Bath	6	Kate French (GBR); ~~Iryna Prasiantsova (BLR)~~; Annika Schleu (GER); Natalya Coyle (IRL); Gintarė Venčkauskaitė (LTU); Marie Oteiza (FRA); ~~Adelina Ibatullina (ROC)~~; Sarolta Kovács (HUN)
2019 UIPM World Championships	3–9 September 2019	(Hungary) Budapest	2	Volha Silkina (BLR); Elena Micheli (ITA)
Asia & Oceania Championships	11–21 November 2019	(China) Kunming	5	Kim Se-hee (KOR); Natsumi Tomonaga (JPN); Alise Fakhrutdinova (UZB); Zhang Mingyu (CHN); Yelena Potapenko (KAZ)
Asia & Oceania Championships	11–21 November 2019	(China) Kunming	1	~~Rebecca Jamieson (NZL)~~ (Note: New Zealand declined its quota spot in February 2020.); Marina Carrier (AUS)
2021 UIPM World Championships	8–14 June 2021	(Egypt) Cairo	3	Anastasiya Prokopenko (BLR); Élodie Clouvel (FRA); Michelle Gulyas (HUN)
Pentathlon World Ranking	14 June 2021	—	7	Joanna Muir (GBR); Mayan Oliver (MEX); Gulnaz Gubaydullina (ROC); ~~Janine Kohlmann (GER)~~; Anna Maliszewska (POL); İlke Özyüksel (TUR); Rena Shimazu (JPN); Kim Sun-woo (KOR)
Reallocation (World Ranking)	—	—	5	Zhang Xiaonan (CHN); Amira Kandil (EGY); Rebecca Langrehr (GER); Alice Sotero (ITA); Uliana Batashova (ROC)
Total			36	
