= Modern pentathlon at the 2023 European Games – Men's individual =

Men's individual modern pentathlon at the 2023 European Games
- Venue: AWF Sports Centre
- Location: Kraków, Poland
- Date: 26 June (qualification); 27–28 June (semifinals); 1 July (final)
- Competitors: 59 from 22 nations
- Winning total: 1534

Medalists
gold medal	Giorgio Malan	Italy
silver medal	Joe Choong	Great Britain
bronze medal	Csaba Bőhm	Hungary

The men's individual modern pentathlon competition at the 2023 European Games in Kraków was held from 26 June to 1 July 2023.

== Results ==
=== Qualification ===
==== Qualification A ====
Rank	Athlete	Nation	Fencing Victories (pts)	Swimming Time (pts)	Laser run Time (pts)	Total	Notes
1	Buğra Ünal	Turkey	15 (215)	2:05.95 (299)	10:17.7 (683)	1197	Q
2	Sebastian Stasiak	Poland	15 (215)	2:04.90 (301)	10:20.0 (680)	1196	Q
3	Mihály Koleszár	Hungary	18 (236)	2:02.30 (306)	10:46.1 (654)	1196	Q
4	Martin Vlach	Czech Republic	12 (194)	2:06.30 (298)	9:56.2 (704)	1196	Q
5	Giorgio Malan	Italy	10 (180)	1:56.75 (317)	10:01.2 (699)	1196	Q
6	Marvin Dogue	Germany	15 (215)	2:05.64 (299)	10:18.5 (682)	1196	Q
7	Maksym Aharushev	Ukraine	15 (215)	2:04.84 (301)	10:20.5 (680)	1196	Q
8	Myles Pillage	Great Britain	16 (222)	1:53.72 (323)	10:50.3 (650)	1195	Q
9	Oleksandr Tovkai	Ukraine	13 (201)	1:59.33 (312)	10:18.4 (682)	1195	Q
10	Valentin Prades	France	19 (243)	2:02.91 (305)	10:53.7 (647)	1195	Q
11	Bence Demeter	Hungary	15 (215)	2:01.62 (307)	10:28.1 (672)	1194	Q
12	Pāvels Švecovs	Latvia	22 (264)	2:01.27 (308)	11:18.2 (622)	1194	Q
13	Joe Choong	Great Britain	18 (236)	1:56.94 (317)	10:59.4 (641)	1194	Q
14	Pau Salomo	Spain	14 (208)	2:08.23 (294)	10:08.6 (692)	1194	Q
15	Ugo Fleurot	France	15 (215)	1:59.40 (312)	10:33.9 (667)	1194	Q
16	Kamil Kasperczak	Poland	15 (215)	2:04.62 (301)	10:23.9 (677)	1193	Q
17	Pele Uibel	Germany	17 (229)	2:08.47 (294)	10:31.4 (669)	1192	Q
18	Marek Grycz	Czech Republic	11 (187)	1:59.40 (312)	10:12.9 (688)	1187	Q
19	Aleix Heredia	Spain	20 (250)	2:11.74 (287)	10:58.4 (642)	1179	
20	Gaga Khijakadze	Georgia	18 (236)	2:11.86 (287)	10:48.4 (652)	1175	
21	Todor Mihalev	Bulgaria	14 (208)	2:04.96 (301)	10:40.4 (660)	1169	
22	Lukas Gaudiešius	Lithuania	12 (194)	1:59.67 (311)	11:11.7 (629)	1134	
23	Radoslav Stoychev	Bulgaria	11 (187)	2:19.08 (272)	10:53.5 (647)	1106	
24	Dora Nusretoğlu	Turkey	10 (180)	1:59.03 (312)	11:28.8 (612)	1104	
25	Filippos Sechidis	Greece	7 (159)	2:04.11 (302)	11:09.2 (631)	1092	
26	Paulius Vagnorius	Lithuania	7 (159)	2:14.70 (281)	11:02.3 (638)	1078	
27	Giorgi Tskhadadze	Georgia	5 (145)	2:15.71 (279)	10:56.2 (644)	1068	
28	Tiitus Ämmälä	Finland	11 (187)	2:16.55 (277)	12:29.2 (551)	1015	
29	Gianluca Micozzi	Italy	10 (180)	2:14.69 (281)	DNS (0)	461	

==== Qualification B ====
Rank	Athlete	Nation	Fencing Victories (pts)	Swimming Time (pts)	Laser run Time (pts)	Total	Notes
1	Daniel Ławrynowicz	Poland	19 (243)	2:04.12 (302)	10:54.0 (646)	1191	Q
2	Charles Brown	Great Britain	14 (208)	1:57.40 (316)	10:33.7 (667)	1191	Q
3	Christopher Patte	France	15 (215)	2:04.50 (301)	10:26.2 (674)	1190	Q
4	Valentin Belaud	France	16 (222)	2:04.49 (302)	10:34.5 (666)	1190	Q
5	Csaba Bőhm	Hungary	12 (194)	1:59.30 (312)	10:16.6 (684)	1190	Q
6	Christian Zillekens	Germany	15 (215)	2:07.52 (295)	10:20.9 (680)	1190	Q
7	Patrick Dogue	Germany	18 (236)	2:03.94 (303)	10:49.9 (651)	1190	Q
8	Pavlo Tymoshchenko	Ukraine	16 (222)	2:08.18 (294)	10:27.4 (673)	1189	Q
9	Jan Kuf	Czech Republic	21 (257)	2:05.96 (299)	11:07.4 (633)	1189	Q
10	Alexandre Dällenbach	Switzerland	15 (215)	1:55.57 (319)	10:45.6 (655)	1189	Q
11	Carl Robert Kallaste	Estonia	20 (250)	2:09.01 (292)	10:54.0 (646)	1188	Q
12	Łukasz Gutkowski	Poland	18 (236)	2:04.75 (301)	10:49.5 (651)	1188	Q
13	Yuriy Kovalchuk	Ukraine	17 (229)	2:00.49 (310)	10:51.9 (649)	1188	Q
14	Ondřej Polívka	Czech Republic	18 (236)	2:06.45 (298)	10:49.0 (651)	1185	Q
15	Balázs Szép	Hungary	13 (201)	2:04.85 (301)	10:17.9 (683)	1185	Q
16	Matteo Cicinelli	Italy	13 (201)	1:58.25 (314)	10:31.1 (669)	1184	Q
17	Roberto Micheli	Italy	12 (194)	1:59.94 (311)	10:21.5 (679)	1184	Q
18	Vital Müller	Switzerland	17 (229)	2:01.42 (308)	11:02.8 (638)	1175	Q
19	Tolga Topaklı	Turkey	15 (215)	2:06.20 (298)	10:52.2 (648)	1161	
20	Gustav Gustenau	Austria	15 (215)	1:59.01 (312)	11:13.8 (627)	1154	
21	Samuel Curry	Great Britain	14 (208)	2:00.48 (310)	11:08.2 (632)	1150	
22	Titas Puronas	Lithuania	10 (180)	2:12.41 (286)	10:19.7 (681)	1147	
23	Daniel Steinbock	Sweden	12 (194)	2:03.98 (303)	10:55.3 (645)	1142	
24	Emil Grozdanov	Bulgaria	10 (180)	2:08.59 (293)	10:36.5 (664)	1137	
25	Cristian Chamizo	Spain	12 (194)	2:05.23 (300)	10:59.7 (641)	1135	
26	Kıvanç Taşyaran	Turkey	8 (166)	2:15.06 (280)	10:16.2 (684)	1130	
27	Duarte Taleigo	Portugal	16 (222)	2:05.39 (300)	11:32.5 (608)	1130	
28	Valentin Samsonov	Moldova	8 (166)	2:01.53 (307)	10:46.4 (654)	1127	
29	Denis Kolev	Bulgaria	11 (187)	2:06.05 (298)	11:04.7 (636)	1121	
30	Nojus Chmieliauskas	Lithuania	9 (173)	2:12.98 (285)	10:52.4 (648)	1106	

=== Semifinals ===
==== Semifinal A ====
Rank	Athlete	Nation	Fencing RR+BR Victories (pts)	Swimming Time (pts)	Laser run Time (pts)	Total	Notes
1	Oleksandr Tovkai	Ukraine	22+1 (237)	2:03.25 (304)	10:35.8 (665)	1206	Q
2	Ugo Fleurot	France	17+1 (212)	2:00.92 (309)	10:17.4 (683)	1204	Q
3	Alexandre Dällenbach	Switzerland	20+0 (225)	1:56.13 (318)	10:39.8 (661)	1204	Q
4	Marvin Dogue	Germany	22+3 (241)	2:07.49 (296)	10:34.9 (666)	1203	Q
5	Giorgio Malan	Italy	19+3 (226)	1:59.10 (312)	10:38.3 (662)	1200	Q
6	Myles Pillage	Great Britain	21+0 (230)	1:58.32 (314)	10:45.7 (655)	1199	Q
7	Marek Grycz	Czech Republic	15+0 (200)	2:02.84 (305)	10:08.5 (692)	1197	Q
8	Valentin Prades	France	25+0 (250)	2:07.79 (295)	10:48.0 (652)	1197	Q
9	Joe Choong	Great Britain	22+0 (235)	1:59.62 (311)	10:49.2 (651)	1197	Q
10	Mihály Koleszár	Hungary	15+2 (204)	2:02.89 (305)	10:18.8 (682)	1191	
11	Bence Demeter	Hungary	13+3 (196)	2:02.86 (305)	10:16.6 (684)	1185	
12	Daniel Ławrynowicz	Poland	15+1 (202)	2:05.65 (299)	10:18.2 (682)	1183	
13	Martin Vlach	Czech Republic	12+0 (185)	2:08.45 (294)	9:57.1 (703)	1182	
14	Buğra Ünal	Turkey	13+0 (190)	2:07.22 (296)	10:07.0 (693)	1179	
15	Pele Uibel	Germany	15+1 (202)	2:09.43 (292)	10:33.0 (667)	1161	
16	Kamil Kasperczak	Poland	15+0 (200)	2:04.69 (301)	10:50.6 (650)	1151	
17	Maksym Aharushev	Ukraine	9+1 (172)	2:07.56 (295)	10:22.4 (678)	1145	
18	Carl Robert Kallaste	Estonia	16+1 (207)	2:13.75 (283)	11:21.7 (619)	1109	

==== Semifinal B ====
Rank	Athlete	Nation	Fencing RR+BR Victories (pts)	Swimming Time (pts)	Laser run Time (pts)	Total	Notes
1	Csaba Bőhm	Hungary	19+0 (220)	1:58.70 (313)	10:21.6 (679)	1212	Q
2	Charles Brown	Great Britain	17+3 (216)	2:01.39 (308)	10:14.4 (686)	1210	Q
3	Łukasz Gutkowski	Poland	21+1 (232)	2:06.28 (298)	10:20.6 (680)	1210	Q
4	Matteo Cicinelli	Italy	18+2 (219)	1:59.15 (312)	10:21.8 (679)	1210	Q
5	Patrick Dogue	Germany	25+0 (250)	2:07.94 (295)	10:36.2 (664)	1209	Q
6	Valentin Belaud	France	19+2 (224)	2:06.34 (298)	10:13.4 (687)	1209	Q
7	Christopher Patte	France	19+1 (222)	2:04.06 (302)	10:15.4 (685)	1209	Q
8	Roberto Micheli	Italy	16+1 (207)	2:00.09 (310)	10:08.9 (692)	1209	Q
9	Balázs Szép	Hungary	13+1 (192)	2:03.36 (304)	9:50.8 (710)	1206	Q
10	Christian Zillekens	Germany	15+1 (202)	2:06.92 (297)	9:58.7 (702)	1201	
11	Jan Kuf	Czech Republic	18+0 (215)	2:06.31 (298)	10:19.7 (681)	1194	
12	Yuriy Kovalchuk	Ukraine	13+1 (192)	2:00.99 (309)	10:12.0 (688)	1189	
13	Ondřej Polívka	Czech Republic	17+0 (210)	2:07.63 (295)	10:22.1 (678)	1183	
14	Pāvels Švecovs	Latvia	21+2 (234)	2:02.00 (306)	10:59.8 (641)	1181	
15	Sebastian Stasiak	Poland	17+0 (210)	2:08.66 (293)	10:29.3 (671)	1174	
16	Vital Müller	Switzerland	16+1 (207)	2:02.63 (305)	10:55.7 (645)	1157	
17	Pavlo Tymoshchenko	Ukraine	15+1 (202)	2:08.04 (294)	10:53.1 (647)	1143	
18	Pau Salomo	Spain	13+0 (190)	2:09.15 (292)	10:40.7 (660)	1142	

=== Final ===
Rank	Athlete	Nation	Fencing RR+BR Victories (pts)	Riding (pts)	Swimming Time (pts)	Laser run Time (pts)	Total
1st place, gold medalist(s)	Giorgio Malan	Italy	19+0 (220)	(298)	1:58.03 (314)	9:58.0 (702)	1534
2nd place, silver medalist(s)	Joe Choong	Great Britain	22+1 (237)	(292)	2:01.52 (307)	10:05.7 (695)	1531
3rd place, bronze medalist(s)	Csaba Bőhm	Hungary	19+4 (228)	(293)	2:01.48 (308)	9:59.0 (701)	1530
4	Myles Pillage	Great Britain	21+0 (230)	(286)	1:56.18 (318)	10:10.9 (690)	1524
5	Valentin Prades	France	25+1 (254)	(286)	2:06.24 (298)	10:22.8 (678)	1516
6	Marvin Dogue	Germany	22+1 (237)	(300)	2:04.92 (301)	10:23.8 (677)	1515
7	Valentin Belaud	France	19+2 (224)	(286)	2:06.09 (298)	9:54.7 (706)	1514
8	Łukasz Gutkowski	Poland	21+1 (232)	(300)	2:05.48 (300)	10:25.1 (675)	1507
9	Christopher Patte	France	19+0 (220)	(272)	2:03.11 (304)	9:57.0 (703)	1499
10	Patrick Dogue	Germany	25+1 (252)	(279)	2:05.97 (299)	10:35.5 (665)	1495
11	Charles Brown	Great Britain	17+1 (212)	(280)	2:00.98 (309)	10:08.7 (692)	1493
12	Oleksandr Tovkai	Ukraine	22+1 (237)	(272)	2:02.17 (306)	10:24.5 (676)	1491
13	Alexandre Dällenbach	Switzerland	20+0 (225)	(283)	1:57.44 (316)	10:38.6 (662)	1486
14	Ugo Fleurot	France	17+1 (212)	(293)	2:00.53 (309)	10:32.8 (668)	1482
15	Marek Grycz	Czech Republic	15+0 (200)	(286)	2:02.88 (305)	10:18.8 (682)	1473
16	Roberto Micheli	Italy	16+0 (205)	(279)	1:59.31 (312)	10:24.6 (676)	1472
17	Balázs Szép	Hungary	13+2 (194)	(286)	2:05.30 (300)	10:25.6 (675)	1455
18	Matteo Cicinelli	Italy	18+1 (217)	(227)	2:05.98 (299)	10:44.7 (656)	1399

=== Team standings ===
Rank	Nation	Athlete	Reached level	Points	Team points
1st place, gold medalist(s)	Great Britain	Joe Choong	F	1531	4548
1st place, gold medalist(s)	Great Britain	Myles Pillage	F	1524	4548
1st place, gold medalist(s)	Great Britain	Charles Brown	F	1493	4548
2nd place, silver medalist(s)	France	Valentin Prades	F	1516	4529
2nd place, silver medalist(s)	France	Valentin Belaud	F	1514	4529
2nd place, silver medalist(s)	France	Christopher Patte	F	1499	4529
3rd place, bronze medalist(s)	Italy	Giorgio Malan	F	1534	4405
3rd place, bronze medalist(s)	Italy	Roberto Micheli	F	1472	4405
3rd place, bronze medalist(s)	Italy	Matteo Cicinelli	F	1399	4405
4	Germany	Marvin Dogue	F	1515	4211
4	Germany	Patrick Dogue	F	1495	4211
4	Germany	Christian Zillekens	SF	1201	4211
5	Hungary	Csaba Bőhm	F	1530	4176
5	Hungary	Balázs Szép	F	1455	4176
5	Hungary	Mihály Koleszár	SF	1191	4176
6	Poland	Łukasz Gutkowski	F	1507	3864
6	Poland	Daniel Ławrynowicz	SF	1183	3864
6	Poland	Sebastian Stasiak	SF	1174	3864
7	Czech Republic	Marek Grycz	F	1473	3850
7	Czech Republic	Jan Kuf	SF	1194	3850
7	Czech Republic	Ondřej Polívka	SF	1183	3850
8	Ukraine	Oleksandr Tovkai	F	1491	3825
8	Ukraine	Yuriy Kovalchuk	SF	1189	3825
8	Ukraine	Maksym Aharushev	SF	1145	3825
9	Turkey	Buğra Ünal	SF	1179	3470
9	Turkey	Tolga Topaklı	Q	1161	3470
9	Turkey	Kıvanç Taşyaran	Q	1130	3470
10	Spain	Pau Salomo	SF	1142	3456
10	Spain	Aleix Heredia	Q	1179	3456
10	Spain	Cristian Chamizo	Q	1135	3456
11	Bulgaria	Todor Mihalev	Q	1169	3427
11	Bulgaria	Emil Grozdanov	Q	1137	3427
11	Bulgaria	Denis Kolev	Q	1121	3427
12	Lithuania	Titas Puronas	Q	1147	3387
12	Lithuania	Lukas Gaudiešius	Q	1134	3387
12	Lithuania	Nojus Chmieliauskas	Q	1106	3387
