= Modern pentathlon at the 2024 Summer Olympics – Men's =

Men's modern pentathlon events at the Olympics

Men's modern pentathlon at the Games of the XXXIII Olympiad
- Venues: Parc des Expositions de Villepinte (fencing); Palace of Versailles (swimming, riding and laser run)
- Dates: 8 to 10 August 2024
- Competitors: 36 from 24 nations

Medalists
1st place, gold medalist(s)		Ahmed El-Gendy	Egypt
2nd place, silver medalist(s)		Taishu Sato	Japan
3rd place, bronze medalist(s)		Giorgio Malan	Italy

The men's modern pentathlon at the 2024 Summer Olympics in Paris was from 8 to 10 August 2024. Two venues were used: Parc des Expositions de Villepinte (fencing) and Palace of Versailles (swimming, horse-riding, and combined running & shooting). Egypt's Ahmed El-Gendy won the gold medal with a world-record total score of 1555 points.

== Schedule ==
All times are Central European Summer Time (UTC+2)

Date	Time	Round
Thursday, 8 August 2024	11:00	Fencing (Ranking Round)
Friday, 9 August 2024	13:00	Riding (Semifinal A)
Friday, 9 August 2024	13:40	Fencing (Bonus Round) (Semifinal A)
Friday, 9 August 2024	14:10	Swimming (Semifinal A)
Friday, 9 August 2024	14:40	Laser Run (Semifinal A)
Friday, 9 August 2024	17:00	Riding (Semifinal B)
Friday, 9 August 2024	17:40	Fencing (Bonus Round) (Semifinal B)
Friday, 9 August 2024	18:10	Swimming (Semifinal B)
Friday, 9 August 2024	18:40	Laser Run (Semifinal B)
Saturday, 10 August 2024	17:30	Riding (Final)
Saturday, 10 August 2024	18:10	Fencing (Bonus Round) (Final)
Saturday, 10 August 2024	18:40	Swimming (Final)
Saturday, 10 August 2024	19:10	Laser run (Final)

== Results ==
36 athletes participated, with the top 9 from each semifinal advancing to the final.

Key

♦ The highest mark recorded in each event is highlighted in yellow with a diamond symbol.

=== Semifinal A ===
Rank	Athlete	Country	Swimming Time (pts)	Fencing RR+BR Victories (pts)	Riding Time (pts)	Laser run Time (pts)	Total
1	Ahmed Elgendy	Egypt	1:59.76 (311)	24+0 (245)	72.86 (267)	10:07.61 (693)	1516 Q
2	Alexandre Dallenbach	Switzerland	1:58.28 (314)	21+0 (230)	63.87 (300)	10:34.14 (666)	1510 Q
3	Emiliano Hernández	Mexico	2:04.82 (301)	17+5 (220)	63.37 (293)	10:05.89 (695)	1509 Q
4	Matteo Cicinelli	Italy	1:59.90 (311)	19+0 (220)	56.99 (293)	10:16.62 (684)	1508 Q
5	Pāvels Švecovs	Latvia	2:02.17 (306)	23+0 (240)	59.74 (300)	10:40.68 (660)	1506 Q
6	Fabian Liebig	Germany	2:03.81 (303)	17+0 (210)	58.15 (300)	10:09.13 (691)	1504 Q
7	Jean-Baptiste Mourcia	France	2:09.07 (292)	16+1 (207)	59.28 (293)	9:48.28 (712)	1504 Q
8	Csaba Bőhm	Hungary	1:59.50 (311)	13+2 (194)	61.51 (300)	10:04.64 (696)	1501 Q
9	Valentin Prades	France	2:07.25 (296)	20+5 (235)	57.21 (293)	10:24.18 (676)	1500 Q
10	Martin Vlach	Czech Republic	2:07.93 (295)	12+1 (187)	60.29 (300)	9:47.46 (713 OR)	1495
11	Luo Shuai	China	2:06.75 (297)	17+0 (210)	58.74 (286)	9:58.62 (702)	1495
12	Todor Mihalev	Bulgaria	2:06.85 (297)	20+0 (225)	58.20 (293)	10:24.04 (676)	1491
13	Buğra Ünal	Turkey	2:07.24 (296)	20+0 (225)	58.25 (283)	10:23.26 (677)	1481
14	Marek Grycz	Czech Republic	2:00.60 (309)	10+0 (175)	59.73 (286)	10:16.03 (684)	1454
15	Duilio Carrillo	Mexico	2:07.39 (296)	14+0 (195)	61.91 (279)	10:17.52 (683)	1453
16	Georgiy; Boroda-Dudochkin	Kazakhstan	2:08.28 (294)	10+1 (177)	59.49 (300)	10:19.91 (681)	1452
17	Andrés Torres	Ecuador	1:59.70 (311)	16+1 (207)	54.63 (283)	11:29.63 (611)	1412
18	Phurit Yohuang	Thailand	2:02.18 (306)	12+1 (187)	84.66 (245)	11:03.33 (637)	1375

=== Semifinal B ===
Rank	Athlete	Country	Swimming Time (pts)	Fencing RR+BR Victories (pts)	Riding Time (pts)	Laser run Time (pts)	Total
1	Taishu Sato	Japan	2:04.93 (301)	21+1 (232)	61.80 (300)	10:18.02 (682)	1515 Q
2	Jun Woong-tae	South Korea	1:59.90 (311)	22+1 (237)	58.58 (286)	10:19.14 (681)	1515 Q
3	Giorgio Malan	Italy	1:59.82 (311)	18+2 (219)	60.45 (293)	10:12.46 (688)	1511 Q
4	Łukasz Gutkowski	Poland	2:06.21 (298)	20+1 (227)	61.51 (300)	10:20.74 (680)	1505 Q
5	Seo Chang-wan	South Korea	2:00.79 (309)	20+0 (225)	58.71 (300)	10:31.53 (669)	1503 Q
6	Marvin Dogue	Germany	2:07.95 (295)	20+4 (233)	56.96 (286)	10:11.78 (689)	1503 Q
7	Balázs Szép	Hungary	2:03.81 (303)	18+0 (215)	59.53 (293)	10:12.10 (688)	1499 Q
8	Joseph Choong	Great Britain	1:58.71 (313)	14+4 (203)	57.86 (286)	10:05.18 (695)	1497 Q
9	Mohanad Shaban	Egypt	2:04.72 (301)	20+0 (225)	59.55 (286)	10:15.82 (685)	1497 Q
10	Charlie Brown	Great Britain	2:02.45 (306)	14+0 (195)	62.47 (300)	10:07.85 (693)	1494
11	Vladyslav Chekan	Ukraine	2:02.82 (305)	15+0 (200)	60.93 (300)	10:19.49 (681)	1486
12	Li Shuhuan	China	2:09.53 (291)	19+1 (222)	65.26 (291)	10:23.61 (677)	1481
13	Andrés Fernández	Guatemala	1:59.23 (312)	15+0 (200)	57.14 (286)	10:36.88 (664)	1462
14	Franco Serrano	Argentina	2:02.56 (305)	15+1 (202)	56.58 (286)	10:40.88 (660)	1453
15	Marcos Rojas Jiménez	Cuba	2:01.96 (307)	10+0 (175)	67.56 (279)	10:41.65 (659)	1420
16	Esteban Bustos	Chile	2:09.70 (291)	13+1 (192)	72.56 (281)	10:46.96 (654)	1418
17	Oleksandr Tovkai	Ukraine	2:00.93 (309)	24+2 (249)	EL (0)	10:36.41 (664)	1222
18	Kamil Kasperczak	Poland	2:12.73 (285)	20+0 (225)	64.48 (292)	DNF (0)	802

=== Final ===
Rank	Athlete	Country	Swimming Time (pts)	Fencing RR+BR Victories (pts)	Riding Time (pts)	Laser run Time (pts)	Total
1st place, gold medalist(s)	Ahmed Elgendy	Egypt	1:59.30 (312)	24+0 (245)	55.71 (300)	10:02.47 (698)	1555 WR
2nd place, silver medalist(s)	Taishu Sato	Japan	2:04.21 (302)	21+1 (232)	59.21 (300)	9:52.85 (708)	1542
3rd place, bronze medalist(s)	Giorgio Malan	Italy	1:59.23 (312)	18+0 (215)	61.97 (300)	9:51.70 (709)	1536
4	Emiliano Hernández	Mexico	2:03.39 (304)	17+6 (222)	60.54 (286)	9:40.80 (720 WBT)	1532
5	Matteo Cicinelli	Italy	1:59.06 (312)	19+0 (220)	58.86 (293)	9:58.23 (702)	1527
6	Jun Woong-tae	South Korea	1:59.41 (312)	22+3 (241)	66.55 (287)	10:14.33 (686)	1526
7	Seo Chang-wan	South Korea	2:01.53 (307)	20+2 (229)	61.06 (286)	10:02.33 (698)	1520
8	Marvin Dogue	Germany	2:07.00 (296)	20+0 (225)	52.65 (293)	9:54.76 (706)	1520
9	Joseph Choong	Great Britain	1:57.52 (315)	14+2 (199)	61.07 (293)	9:48.09 (712)	1519
10	Balázs Szép	Hungary	2:05.83 (299)	18+0 (215)	56.59 (300)	9:55.29 (705)	1519
11	Jean-Baptiste Mourcia	France	2:10.05 (290)	16+0 (205)	58.67 (300)	9:43.94 (717)	1512
12	Fabian Liebig	Germany	2:04.18 (302)	17+0 (210)	56.43 (300)	10:05.62 (695)	1507
13	Csaba Bőhm	Hungary	1:58.94 (313)	13+0 (190)	56.91 (286)	9:44.87 (716)	1505
14	Alexandre Dallenbach	Switzerland	1:57.64 (315)	21+1 (232)	59.98 (293)	10:40.55 (660)	1500
15	Łukasz Gutkowski	Poland	2:05.28 (300)	20+0 (225)	59.94 (286)	10:19.70 (681)	1492
16	Valentin Prades	France	2:07.07 (296)	20+1 (227)	59.17 (272)	10:25.43 (675)	1452
17	Pāvels Švecovs	Latvia	2:03.71 (303)	23+0 (240)	57.47 (279)	11:10.97 (630)	1452
18	Mohanad Shaban	Egypt	2:05.35 (300)	20+1 (227)	EL	10:46.68 (654)	1181
