= Modern pentathlon at the 2020 Summer Olympics – Men's =

Men's modern pentathlon events at the Olympics

Men's modern pentathlon at the Games of the XXXII Olympiad
- Venues: Musashino Forest Sport Plaza (fencing); Tokyo Stadium (swimming, riding and laser run)
- Dates: 5 and 7 August 2021
- Competitors: 36 from 26 nations
- Winning total: 1482 OR

Medalists
1st place, gold medalist(s)		Joe Choong	Great Britain
2nd place, silver medalist(s)		Ahmed El-Gendy	Egypt
3rd place, bronze medalist(s)		Jun Woong-tae	South Korea

The men's modern pentathlon at the 2020 Summer Olympics in Tokyo was held on 5 and 7 August 2021. Two venues were used: Musashino Forest Sport Plaza (fencing) and Tokyo Stadium (swimming, horse-riding and combined running and shooting).

== Schedule ==
All times are Japan Standard Time (UTC+9)

Date	Time	Round
Thursday, 5 August 2021	13:00	Fencing (Ranking Round)
Saturday, 7 August 2021	14:30	Swimming
Saturday, 7 August 2021	15:45	Fencing (Bonus Round)
Saturday, 7 August 2021	17:15	Riding
Saturday, 7 August 2021	19:30	Laser run

== Results ==
Thirty-six athletes participated.

Key

♦ The highest mark recorded in each event is highlighted in yellow with a diamond symbol.

Rank	Athlete	Country	Swimming Time (pts)	Fencing RR+BR Victories (pts)	Riding Time (pts)	Laser run Time (pts)	Total
1st place, gold medalist(s)	Joe Choong	Great Britain	1:54.87 (321)	25+1 (252)^{♦}	75.37 (286)	11:17.53 (623)	1482 OR
2nd place, silver medalist(s)	Ahmed El-Gendy	Egypt	1:57.13 (316)	18+1 (209)	82.54 (284)	10:32.47 (668)	1477
3rd place, bronze medalist(s)	Jun Woong-tae	South Korea	1:57.23 (316)	21+0 (226)	84.76 (289)	11:01.84 (639)	1470
4	Jung Jin-hwa	South Korea	1:57.85 (315)	23+1 (239)	80.20 (293)	11:21.95 (619)	1466
5	Martin Vlach	Czech Republic	2:07.19 (296)	16+0 (196)	80.78 (300)^{♦}	10:30.13 (670)^{♦} OR	1462
6	Ádám Marosi	Hungary	1:59.50 (311)	20+0 (220)	83.06 (297)	11:07.43 (633)	1461
7	Valentin Prades	France	2:00.73 (309)	19+3 (217)	82.05 (270)	10:38.89 (662)	1458
8	Jan Kuf	Czech Republic	2:02.32 (306)	23+0 (238)	86.07 (294)	11:23.76 (617)	1455
9	James Cooke	Great Britain	1:53.80 (323)	18+0 (208)	80.41 (293)	11:12.30 (628)	1452
10	Alexander Lifanov	ROC	2:05.60 (299)	25+1 (251)	79.02 (279)	11:19.18 (621)	1450
11	Valentin Belaud	France	2:04.13 (302)	18+4 (212)	78.16 (293)	11:05.74 (635)	1442
12	Łukasz Gutkowski	Poland	2:00.59 (309)	19+1 (215)	81.31 (278)	11:02.50 (638)	1440
13	Sebastian Stasiak	Poland	2:04.59 (301)	18+0 (208)	79.65 (286)	10:55.95 (645)	1440
14	Pāvels Švecovs	Latvia	1:59.83 (311)	22+2 (234)	81.97 (285)	11:40.67 (600)	1430
15	Pavlo Tymoshchenko	Ukraine	2:06.84 (297)	22+1 (233)	80.23 (293)	11:36.58 (604)	1427
16	Gustav Gustenau	Austria	1:56.93 (317)	18+2 (210)	80.11 (300)^{♦}	11:47.97 (593)	1420
17	Ilya Palazkov	Belarus	2:01.15 (308)	24+0 (244)	83.21 (262)	11:35.78 (605)	1419
18	Justinas Kinderis	Lithuania	2:02.84 (305)	24+2 (246)	99.13 (247)	11:22.82 (618)	1416
19	Fabian Liebig	Germany	2:03.02 (304)	16+0 (196)	74.32 (279)	11:08.69 (632)	1411
20	Patrick Dogue	Germany	2:04.27 (302)	11+1 (167)	79.76 (300)^{♦}	11:00.99 (640)	1409
21	Luo Shuai	China	2:04.08 (302)	18+0 (208)	82.65 (249)	10:54.13 (646)	1405
22	Li Shuhuan	China	2:09.27 (292)	16+0 (196)	82.14 (284)	11:08.89 (632)	1404
23	Aleix Heredia	Spain	2:07.78 (295)	16+4 (200)	70.14 (286)	11:34.52 (606)	1387
24	Ahmed Hamed	Egypt	2:06.58 (297)	16+0 (196)	80.20 (279)	11:25.85 (615)	1387
25	Amro El Geziry	United States	1:52.96 (325)^{♦} OR	16+2 (198)	83.38 (290)	12:35.32 (545)	1358
26	Róbert Kasza	Hungary	2:00.61 (309)	15+2 (192)	92.49 (271)	11:58.88 (582)	1354
27	Charles Fernández	Guatemala	1:58.16 (314)	13+1 (179)	137.04 (219)	11:06.56 (634)	1346
28	Shohei Iwamoto	Japan	2:03.75 (303)	12+1 (173)	80.69 (279)	11:52.87 (588)	1343
29	Pavel Ilyashenko	Kazakhstan	2:06.99 (297)	15+1 (191)	89.64 (270)	12:10.28 (570)	1328
30	Sergio Villamayor	Argentina	2:10.34 (290)	11+0 (166)	89.33 (270)	11:42.61 (598)	1324
31	Ed Fernon	Australia	2:10.85 (289)	9+3 (157)	85.17 (288)	12:05.89 (575)	1309
32	Alexander Savkin	Uzbekistan	2:06.64 (297)	7+0 (142)	77.29 (279)	11:55.96 (585)	1303
33	Duilio Carrillo	Mexico	2:04.08 (302)	17+0 (202)	EL (0)	11:31.68 (609)	1113
34	Esteban Bustos	Chile	2:05.24 (300)	18+0 (208)	EL (0)	11:52.66 (588)	1096
35	Álvaro Sandoval	Mexico	2:02.52 (305)	11+1 (167)	EL (0)	11:26.30 (614)	1086
36	Lester Ders	Cuba	2:01.45 (308)	10+0 (160)	EL (0)	11:46.41 (594)	1062

== Records ==
Broken Olympic records during the 2020 Summer Olympics
Swimming	Amro El Geziry (USA)	1:52.96 (325 pts)
Laser run	Martin Vlach (CZE)	10:30.13 (670 pts)
Total	Joe Choong (GBR)	1482 pts
