= Laser Run World Championships =

The UIPM Laser Run World Championships is the premier laser run world championship competition organised by the International Modern Pentathlon Union (UIPM). The competition has been held annually since 2015, with cancellations in 2020 due to COVID-19

== Venues ==
Year	Date	Location
2015	25 September	Perpignan, France
2016	1 September	Lisbon, Portugal
2017	13 October	Cape Town, South Africa
2018	29 September	(Republic of Ireland) Dublin, Ireland
2019	2 September	Budapest, Hungary
2020	cancelled: Xiamen cancelled: Weiden	China; Germany
2021	8 June	Cairo, Egypt
2022	22 September	Lisbon, Portugal
2023	19 August	Bath, United Kingdom
2024	6 June	Zhengzhou, China
2025	12–13 December	Mossel Bay, South Africa
2026	30 October – 1 November	Funchal, Portugal
2027	9–11 December	Jaipur, India

== Champions ==
=== Men's championship ===
Year	Gold	Silver	Bronze
2015	Alexandre Henrard (FRA)	Christopher Patte (FRA)	Valentin Belaud (FRA)
2016	Ondřej Polívka (CZE)	Pieter Oosthuizen (RSA)	Tiago Sousa (POR)
2017	Pieter Oosthuizen (RSA)	Alexandre Dallenbach (SUI)	Khuanchai Khosinklang (THA)
2018	Bence Kardos (HUN)	Tom O'Brien (IRL)	David Kindl (CZE)
2019	Richárd Bereczki (HUN)	Joan Gispert (ESP)	Tamás Fröhlich (HUN)
2021	Amro El Geziry (USA)	Abdelrahman Hussein (EGY)	Ahmed Elsawy (EGY)
2022	Łukasz Gutkowski (POL)	Titas Puronas (LTU)	Paulius Vagnorius (LTU)
2023	Pau Salomó (ESP)	Alexandre Dallenbach (SUI)	Luo Shuai (CHN)
2024	Luo Shuai (CHN)	Lorenzo Macías (MEX)	Liu Zhenfeng (CHN)
2025	Alexandre Dällenbach (SUI)	Todor Mihalev (BUL)	Florian Barenthaler (AUT)
2026	Sam Cobb (GBR)	Florian Bärenthaler (AUT)	Roberto Micheli (ITA)

=== Men's team ===
Year	Gold	Silver	Bronze
2015	France (FRA)	Spain (ESP)	France-2 (FRA)
2016	Portugal (POR)	not awarded	not awarded
2017	South Africa (RSA)	not awarded	not awarded
2018	France (FRA)	not awarded	not awarded
2019	Hungary (HUN)	Thailand (THA)	Portugal (POR)
2021	Egypt (EGY)	not awarded	not awarded
2022	Lithuania (LTU)	France (FRA)	Portugal (POR)
2023	China (CHN)	France (FRA)	Kuwait (KUW)
2025	France (FRA)	South Africa (RSA)	United Arab Emirates (UAE)
2026	Bulgaria (BUL)	Kazakhstan (KAZ)	France (FRA)

=== Women's championship ===
Year	Gold	Silver	Bronze
2015	Anastasiya Prokopenko (BLR)	Eevi Bengs (FIN)	Donna Vakalis (CAN)
2016	Barbora Kodedová (CZE)	Nina Waldner (AUT)	Cogan Juliette (FRA)
2017	Eevi Bengs (FIN)	Suzie Cave (GBR)	Menard Charlotte (FRA)
2018	Jessica Varley (GBR)	Kate Coleman-Lenehan (IRL)	Barbora Rajnoch (CZE)
2019	Kamilla Réti (HUN)	Sarolta Simon (HUN)	Pinelopi Nika (GRE)
2021	Claire Green (USA)	Phaelon French (USA)	Pinelopi Nika (GRE)
2022	Pinelopi Nika (GRE)	Aranka Chalupníková (CZE)	Wiktoria Wierzba (POL)
2023	Elzbieta Adomaitytė (LTU)	Devan Wiebe (CAN)	Alexandra Bousfield (GBR)
2024	Wu Xiyao (CHN)	Ma Yujuan (CHN)	Sun Wanting (CHN)
2025	Julia Dale (MON)	Aranka Chalupníková (CZE)	Tara Schwulst (RSA)
2026	Irene Prampolini (ITA)	Edith López (MEX)	Aurora Tognetti (ITA)

=== Women's team ===
Year	Gold	Silver	Bronze
2017	South Africa (RSA)	not awarded	not awarded
2018	Ireland (IRL)	not awarded	not awarded
2019	Hungary (HUN)	not awarded	not awarded
2021	Greece (GRE)	Egypt (EGY)	not awarded
2022	France (FRA)	Portugal (POR)	Portugal-2 (POR)
2023	Lithuania	France	Kuwait
2024	China (CHN)	Philippines (PHI)	China-2 (CHN)
2025	South Africa (RSA)	South Africa (RSA)	not awarded
2026	Mexico (MEX)	Germany (GER)	not awarded

=== Mixed relay ===
Year	Gold	Silver	Bronze
2015	Belarus; Anastasiya Prokopenko; Mikalai Hayanouski	France; Élodie Clouvel; Alexandre Henrard	United States; Margaux Isaksen; Lucas Schrimsher
2016	Czech Republic; Barbora Kodedová; Ondřej Polívka	Spain; Andrea Vidal; Raúl Blanco	Austria; Nina Waldner; Manfred Waldner
2017	South Africa; Kelly Vroon; Pieter Oosthuizen	Finland; Eevi Bengs; Tiitus Ämmälä	Thailand; Sanruthai Aransiri; Khuanchai Khosinklang
2018	Hungary; Blanka Guzi; Bence Kardos	Great Britain; Jessica Varley; Harry Lane	Ireland; Kate Coleman-Lenehan; Tom O'Brien
2019	Poland; Oktawia Nowacka; Łukasz Gutkowski	Hungary; Kamilla Réti; Richárd Bereczki	Egypt; Sondos Aboubakr; Ahmed Hamed
2021	Egypt; Maya Mohammed; Muhammed Husam	Afghanistan; Habiba Qasemi; Ramin Ahmadi	Germany; Vera Oettinger; Pierre Jander
2022	Poland; Wiktoria Wierzba; Łukasz Gutkowski	France; Célie Lesnard; Florian Gerbe	Portugal; Sara Monteiro; Octavio Vicente
2023	Switzerland; Katharina Jurt; Alexandre Dallenbach	Mexico; Tamara Vega; Lorenzo Macías	Lithuania; Elzbieta Adomaitytė; Titas Puronas
2024	China; Wu Xiyao; Liu Zhenfeng	Mexico; Lorenzo Macías; Mariana Arceo	Philippines; Shyra Aranzado; Samuel German
2025	Monaco; Julia Dale; Geoffrey Delusier	South Africa; Tara Schwulst; Jan Meyer	Lebanon; Marina Fenianos; Ahmad Shamas
2026	France; Suane Annequin; Antoine Pailler	Great Britain; Natalie Hatfield; Sam Cobb	South Africa; Lané van Rooyen; André Theron
