= 2019 European Modern Pentathlon Championships =

- Venue: University of Bath
- Location: Bath, United Kingdom
- Dates: 6–11 August

The 2019 European Modern Pentathlon Championships was held in Bath, England from 6 to 11 August 2019. The event was to be the 27th edition of the competition, and the third held in Great Britain.

The event was a direct qualification event for the 2020 Summer Olympics, with the eight highest finishers in the men's and women's individual events gaining quota places for their National Olympic Committee at the 2020 Games.

== Medal summary ==
=== Men's events ===
Event	Gold	Silver	Bronze
Individual	(United Kingdom) Jamie Cooke	(France) Valentin Prades	(Czech Republic) Martin Vlach
Team	Great Britain; Joe Choong; Jamie Cooke; Tom Toolis	France; Valentin Belaud; Brice Loubet; Valentin Prades	Czech Republic; Jan Kuf; Ondřej Polívka; Martin Vlach
Relay	Great Britain; Myles Pillage; Oliver Murray	Ukraine; Vladyslav Radvynskyi; Andriy Fedechko	Hungary; István Málits; Richárd Bereczki

=== Women's events ===
Event	Gold	Silver	Bronze
Individual	(Lithuania) Laura Asadauskaitė	(United Kingdom) Kate French	(Belarus) Iryna Prasiantsova
Team	Great Britain; Kate French; Joanna Muir; Francesca Summers	Belarus; Iryna Prasiantsova; Anastasiya Prokopenko; Volha Silkina	Lithuania; Laura Asadauskaitė; Ieva Serapinaitė; Gintarė Venčkauskaitė
Relay	Russia; Anastasia Petrova; Ekaterina Khuraskina	Italy; Irene Prampolini; Beatrice Mercuri	Hungary; Luca Barta; Kamilla Réti

=== Mixed events ===
Event	Gold	Silver	Bronze
Relay	Great Britain; Myles Pillage; Kerenza Bryson	Czech Republic; David Kindl; Eliška Přibylová	Italy; Valerio Grasselli; Irene Prampolini

=== Medal table ===
* Host nation (Great Britain)

Rank	Nation	Gold	Silver	Bronze	Total
1	Great Britain*	5	1	0	6
2	Lithuania	1	0	1	2
3	Russia	1	0	0	1
4	France	0	2	0	2
5	Czech Republic	0	1	2	3
6	Belarus	0	1	1	2
6	Italy	0	1	1	2
8	Ukraine	0	1	0	1
9	Hungary	0	0	2	2
Totals (9 entries)		7	7	7	21

== Olympic Qualifiers ==
The following pentathletes secured qualification for the 2020 Olympic Games:

Men	Women
Jamie Cooke (GBR); Valentin Prades (FRA); Martin Vlach (CZE); Łukasz Gutkowski (POL); Bence Demeter (HUN); Justinas Kinderis (LTU); Alexander Lifanov (RUS); Patrick Dogue (GER)	Kate French (GBR); Iryna Prasiantsova (BLR); Annika Schleu (GER); Natalya Coyle (IRL); Marie Oteiza (FRA); Gintarė Venčkauskaitė (LTU); Adelina Ibatullina (RUS); Sarolta Kovacs (HUN)
