= Veronika Novotná =

Czech modern pentathlete (born 2000)

Personal information
- Born: 11 November 2000 (age 25) Příbram, Czech Republic

Sport
- Country: Czech Republic
- Sport: Modern pentathlon
Medal record
Women's modern pentathlon
Representing Czech Republic
European Championships
Bronze medal – third place	2022 Székesfehérvár	Relay

Veronika Novotná (born 11 November 2000) is a Czech modern pentathlete. She was a bronze medalist at the 2022 European Championships and competed at the 2024 Paris Olympics.

== Life ==
Novotná was born on 11 November 2000 in Příbram. She was a swimmer at PK Příbram before focusing on modern pentathlon.

== Career ==
Novotná won silver at the 2022 Pentathlon World Cup Albena in Bulgaria in May 2022. She won bronze at the 2022 European Modern Pentathlon Championships in the women's relay alongside Karolina Křenková.

She reached the final of the 2024 World Modern Pentathlon Championships in Budapest. She placed fourth in the mixed relay at the 2024 European Championships in July 2024.

She qualified to compete at the 2024 Summer Olympics through her world ranking. In August 2024, she competed at the Games in Paris.
