= Modern pentathlon at the 2023 European Games – Mixed relay =

"European Games in Kraków"

Mixed relay modern pentathlon at the 2023 European Games
- Venue: AWF Sports Centre
- Location: Kraków, Poland
- Date: 29 June
- Competitors: 28 from 14 nations
- Teams: 14
- Winning total: 1406

Medalists
gold medal	Karolína Křenková; Martin Vlach	Czech Republic
silver medal	Kamilla Réti; Mihály Koleszár	Hungary
bronze medal	Jessica Varley; Samuel Curry	Great Britain

The mixed relay modern pentathlon competition at the 2023 European Games in Kraków was held on 29 June 2023.

== Results ==
Rank	Nation	Athlete	Fencing RR+BR Victories (pts)	Riding (pts)	Swimming Time (pts)	Laser run Time (pts)	Total
1st place, gold medalist(s)	Czech Republic	Karolína Křenková; Martin Vlach	14+1 (224)	(300)	1:59.10 (312)	12:10.3 (570)	1406
2nd place, silver medalist(s)	Hungary	Kamilla Réti; Mihály Koleszár	16+0 (236)	(293)	2:01.50 (307)	12:15.9 (565)	1401
3rd place, bronze medalist(s)	Great Britain	Jessica Varley; Samuel Curry	13+1 (217)	(300)	2:00.21 (310)	12:12.7 (568)	1395
4	Turkey	İlke Özyüksel; Buğra Ünal	13+3 (221)	(293)	1:58.10 (314)	12:15.6 (565)	1393
5	Spain	Andrea Medina; Aleix Heredia	14+1 (224)	(290)	2:00.74 (309)	12:30.2 (550)	1373
6	Ukraine	Iryna Khokhlova; Yuriy Kovalchuk	13+1 (217)	(272)	1:59.09 (312)	12:10.3 (570)	1371
7	Poland	Natalia Dominiak; Daniel Ławrynowicz	8+1 (182)	(293)	1:57.68 (315)	12:05.0 (575)	1365
8	Sweden	Marlena Jawaid; Daniel Steinbock	15+2 (233)	(286)	1:57.56 (315)	12:56.8 (524)	1358
9	Germany	Cicelle Leh; Christian Zillekens	13+0 (215)	(264)	2:00.99 (309)	12:18.1 (562)	1350
10	Georgia	Kristina Tchitadze; Gaga Khijakadze	12+0 (208)	(290)	2:05.84 (299)	13:00.4 (520)	1317
11	Switzerland	Lea Egloff; Vital Müller	14+1 (224)	(300)	2:02.24 (306)	13:52.9 (468)	1298
12	Bulgaria	Ralitsa Miteva; Denis Kolev	9+0 (187)	(0)	2:00.19 (310)	12:41.5 (539)	1036
13	Greece	Ariadni Naskari; Filippos Sechidis	13+0 (215)	(0)	2:10.33 (290)	13:42.5 (478)	983
14	Estonia	Johanna Maria Jõgisu; Carl Robert Kallaste	12+2 (212)	(293)	2:03.62 (303)	DNS (0)	808
