= 2019 World Modern Pentathlon Championships =

2019 World Championships
- Location: Budapest, Hungary
- Dates: 2–9 September

The 2019 World Modern Pentathlon Championships were held in Budapest, Hungary from 2 to 9 September 2019.

The 59th edition of the championships, and the 23rd in which the men's and women's events have been combined, the individual competitions also operate as a direct qualification event for the Modern pentathlon at the 2020 Summer Olympics, with three quota places available in each event

== Medal table ==
* Host nation (Hungary)

Rank	Nation	Gold	Silver	Bronze	Total
1	Belarus (BLR)	2	0	1	3
2	South Korea (KOR)	1	1	2	4
3	France (FRA)	1	1	0	2
4	Germany (GER)	1	0	1	2
5	Egypt (EGY)	1	0	0	1
5	Mexico (MEX)	1	0	0	1
7	Great Britain (GBR)	0	2	2	4
8	Hungary (HUN)*	0	2	0	2
9	Italy (ITA)	0	1	0	1
10	Russia (RUS)	0	0	1	1
Totals (10 entries)		7	7	7	21

== Medal summary ==
=== Men ===
Event	Gold		Silver		Bronze	
Individual	Valentin Belaud; France	1468	Joseph Choong; Great Britain	1453	Jun Woong-tae; South Korea	1452
Team	South Korea; Jun Woong-tae; Jung Jin-hwa; Lee Ji-hun	4309	Hungary; Bence Demeter; Róbert Kasza; Ádám Marosi	4272	Great Britain; Joe Choong; James Cooke; Thomas Toolis	4258
Relay	Germany; Patrick Dogue; Alexander Nobis	1506	South Korea; Jun Woong-tae; Jung Jin-hwa	1482	Russia; Danil Kalimullin; Aleksander Lesun	1475

=== Women ===
Event	Gold		Silver		Bronze	
Individual	Volha Silkina; Belarus	1368	Elena Micheli; Italy	1357	Kate French; Great Britain	1357
Team	Belarus; Volha Silkina; Anastasiya Prokopenko; Iryna Prasiantsova	4007	Great Britain; Kate French; Joanna Muir; Francesca Summers	3991	Germany; Rebecca Langrehr; Janine Kohlmann; Annika Schleu	3933
Relay	Mexico; Mariana Arceo; Mayan Oliver	1338	Hungary; Luca Barta; Kamilla Réti	1329	South Korea; Jeong Mi-na; Kim Un-ju	1326

=== Mixed ===
Event	Gold		Silver		Bronze	
Relay	Egypt; Eslam Hamad; Salma Abdelmaksoud	1463	France; Valentin Belaud; Élodie Clouvel	1454	Belarus; Ilya Palazkov; Anastasiya Prokopenko	1448

== Olympic qualification ==
The individual events at the 2019 Championships doubled as a direct Olympic Games qualifier event. The following athletes achieved qualification for the Modern pentathlon event in Tokyo 2020 by achieving a top three finish in their respective individual event:

2020 Summer Olympics Qualification
Men	Women
Valentin Belaud (FRA); Jun Woong-tae (KOR)	Volha Silkina (BLR); Elena Micheli (ITA)
* Joseph Chung and Kate French, both Great Britain, achieved a top three finishing position to qualify for Tokyo 2020. In both cases, however, the athlete had already previously qualified, and so their quota is vacated, and added to the quotas to be awarded on world ranking points at the end of the qualification period.
