= Maksym Aharushev =

Ukrainian modern pentathlete (born 2000)

Personal information
- Nationality: Ukrainian
- Born: 27 January 2000 (age 26) Kyiv, Ukraine
- Height: 177 cm (5 ft 10 in)
- Weight: 67 kg (148 lb)

Sport
- Country: Ukraine
- Sport: Modern pentathlon
- Club: Armed Forces of Ukraine
- Team: Kyiv, Ukraine
- Coached by: Victoria Tereshchuk
Medal record
Men's modern pentathlon
Representing Ukraine
World Championships
Silver medal – second place	2024 Zhengzhou	Relay
European Championships
Bronze medal – third place	2022 Székesfehérvár	Individual
Bronze medal – third place	2026 Istanbul	Team

Maksym Aharushev (Ukrainian: Максим Агарушев; born 27 January 2000) is a Ukrainian modern pentathlete. He is bronze medallist of the 2022 European Championships. Together with Oleksandr Tovkai, he won a silver medal in men's relay at the 2024 World Championships in Zhengzhou.

Aharushev competed at the 2023 European Games where he finished 17th in the semifinal A.

Aharushev studied logistics management and transport safety at the East Ukrainian National University.
