= Adelina Ibatullina =

Russian modern pentathlete (born 1999)

Personal information
- Born: 26 January 1999 (age 27) Ufa, Russia

Sport
- Country: Russia
- Sport: Modern pentathlon
- Club: CSKA Moscow
- Coached by: Yevgeny Zinkovsky
Medal record
Representing Russia
European Championships
Silver medal – second place	2021 Nizhny Novgorod	Team

Adelina Ibatullina (Russian: Аделина Ибатуллина; born 26 January 1999) is a Russian modern pentathlete.

== Personal life ==
Adelina Ibatullina was born on 26 January 1999, in Ufa, and she is Bashkir. She has been a vegetarian since 2014.

== Career ==
Ibatullina competed at the 2014 Youth Olympics and finished sixth individually. She also competed with Radion Khripchenko from Kyrgyzstan in the mixed relay, and they finished seventh. She then won the gold medal at the 2017 U19 World Championships.

Ibatullina won the gold medal at the 2019 Russian Championships in the individual event and in the team event with the Moscow team. She competed at the 2019 European Championships where she finished eleventh and qualified a spot to the 2020 Olympic Games. She won the individual gold medal at the 2019 European Junior Championships. At the 2019 Junior World Championships, she won three gold medals: in individual pentathlon, in the relay with Kseniia Fraltsova, and in the team event. She also competed at the 2019 World Championships at the senior level where she finished nineteenth in her qualification group.

Ibatullina won a silver medal in the team event at the 2021 European Championships alongside Sophia Kozlova and Gulnaz Gubaydullina. Although she had qualified a spot for the 2020 Olympic Games, the Russian Olympic Committee had qualified three athletes but were only permitted to send two, and Gubaydullina and Uliana Batashova were chosen to compete.
