= Elzbieta Adomaitytė =

Lithuanian modern pentathlete (born 2002)

Personal information
- Born: 7 January 2002 (age 24)
- Height: 170 cm (5 ft 7 in)
- Weight: 59 kg (130 lb)

Sport
- Sport: Modern pentathlon
Medal record
Representing Lithuania
Women's modern pentathlon
World Championships
Bronze medal – third place	2024 Zhengzhou	Mixed relay
European Championships
Gold medal – first place	2022 Székesfehérvár	Relay
Bronze medal – third place	2022 Székesfehérvár	Team
Bronze medal – third place	2024 Budapest	Mixed relay
World Junior Championships
Bronze medal – third place	2021 Alexandria	Individual
Bronze medal – third place	2022 Zielona Góra	Individual
Bronze medal – third place	2022 Zielona Góra	Mixed relay
Bronze medal – third place	2023 Druskininkai	Mixed relay
European Junior Championships
Silver medal – second place	2022 Barcelona	Individual
Bronze medal – third place	2022 Barcelona	Mixed Relay
European Youth Championships
Bronze medal – third place	2018 Drzonkow	Mixed Relay
Women's laser-run
World Championships
Gold medal – first place	2023 Bath	Individual
Gold medal – first place	2023 Bath	Team
Bronze medal – third place	2023 Bath	Mixed relay

Elzbieta Adomaitytė (born 7 January 2002) is a Lithuanian modern pentathlete. She began competing in 2016. Adomaitytė represented Lithuania at the 2022 European Modern Pentathlon Championships, where she won gold medal in the women's relay event and bronze medal in women's team event.
