= Volha Silkina =

Belarusian modern pentathlete

Personal information
- Native name: Вольга Сілкіна
- Born: 27 May 1995 (age 31)

Sport
- Country: Belarus
- Sport: Modern pentathlon
Medal record
World Championships
Gold medal – first place	2019 Budapest	Individual
Gold medal – first place	2019 Budapest	Team
Gold medal – first place	2021 Cairo	Relay
Bronze medal – third place	2021 Cairo	Team
European Championships
Gold medal – first place	2018 Székesfehérvár	Relay
Gold medal – first place	2021 Nizhny Novgorod	Relay
Silver medal – second place	2019 Bath	Team
Bronze medal – third place	2017 Minsk	Team

Volha Silkina (Belarusian: Вольга Сілкіна; born 27 May 1995) is a Belarusian modern pentathlete. She won the gold medal in the women's individual event at the 2019 World Modern Pentathlon Championships held in Budapest, Hungary. She also won the gold medal in the women's team event together with Anastasiya Prokopenko and Iryna Prasiantsova.

She competed at the European Modern Pentathlon Championships in 2017, 2018 and 2019.

She represented Belarus at the 2020 Summer Olympics in Tokyo, Japan.
