= 2022 European Modern Pentathlon Championships =

2022 European Championships
- Location: Székesfehérvár, Hungary
- Dates: 13–19 September

The 2022 European Modern Pentathlon Championships was held from 13 to 19 September 2022 in Székesfehérvár, Hungary.

== Medal summary ==
=== Men's events ===
Event	Gold		Silver		Bronze	
Individual	Richárd Bereczki; Hungary	1524	Balázs Szép; Hungary	1512	Maksym Aharushev; Ukraine	1510
Team	Hungary; Richárd Bereczki; Bence Demeter; Balázs Szép	4537	France; Christopher Patte; Pierre Dejardin; Valentin Belaud	4472	Czech Republic; Ondřej Svechota; Martin Vlach; Ondřej Polívka	4367
Relay	Czech Republic; Martin Vlach; Jan Kuf	1455	Poland; Kamil Kasperczak; Łukasz Gutkowski	1440	France; Jean-Baptiste Mourcia; Alexandre Henrard	1433

=== Women's events ===
Event	Gold		Silver		Bronze	
Individual	Charlie Follett; Great Britain	1422	Joanna Muir; Great Britain	1393	Michelle Gulyás; Hungary	1383
Team	Great Britain; Charlie Follett; Joanna Muir; Kate French	4185	Hungary; Michelle Gulyás; Sarolta Simon; Blanka Guzi	4102	Lithuania; Ieva Serapinaitė; Elzbieta Adomaitytė; Aurelija Tamašauskaitė	3459
Relay	Lithuania; Ieva Serapinaitė; Elzbieta Adomaitytė	1342	Poland; Natalia Dominiak; Oktawia Nowacka	1335	Czech Republic; Veronika Novotná; Karolína Křenková	1322

=== Mixed events ===
Event	Gold		Silver		Bronze	
Relay	Great Britain; Kate French; Myles Pillage	1360	Italy; Matteo Cicinelli; Alessandra Frezza	1352	France; Marie Oteiza; Ugo Fleuret	1348

=== Medal table ===
* Host nation (Hungary)

Rank	Nation	Gold	Silver	Bronze	Total
1	Great Britain	3	1	0	4
2	Hungary*	2	2	1	5
3	Czech Republic	1	0	2	3
4	Lithuania	1	0	1	2
5	Poland	0	2	0	2
6	France	0	1	2	3
7	Italy	0	1	0	1
8	Ukraine	0	0	1	1
Totals (8 entries)		7	7	7	21
