= 2023 World Junior Modern Pentathlon Championships =

- Location: Druskininkai, Lithuania
- Dates: 11–17 September

The 2023 World Junior Modern Pentathlon Championships was held from 11 to 17 September 2023 in Druskininkai, Lithuania.

== Medal table ==
* Host nation (Lithuania)

Rank	Nation	Gold	Silver	Bronze	Total
1	France	3	0	2	5
2	Egypt	3	0	0	3
3	Germany	1	1	1	3
4	Poland	0	2	0	2
5	Lithuania*	0	1	2	3
6	Ukraine	0	1	1	2
7	Great Britain	0	1	0	1
7	Hungary	0	1	0	1
9	Italy	0	0	1	1
Totals (9 entries)		7	7	7	21

== Medal summary ==
=== Men's modern pentathlon ===
Event	Gold		Silver		Bronze	
Individual	Mathis Rochat (FRA)	1539	Paulius Vagnorius (LTU)	1527	Léo Bories (FRA)	1526
Team	France; Mathis Rochat; Léo Bories; Émilien Maire	4574	Great Britain; Ross Charlton; James Hulme; Charles Brown	4528	Ukraine; Roman Popov; Vladyslav Chekan; Dmytro Khudenko	4513
Relay	France; Mathis Rochat; Émilien Maire	1441	Ukraine; Roman Popov; Vladyslav Chekan	1439	Italy; Luca Gioia; Giorgio Micheli	1409

=== Women's modern pentathlon ===
Event	Gold		Silver		Bronze	
Individual	Josefine Unterberger (GER)	1407	Katarzyna Dębska (POL)	1402	Louison Cazaly (FRA)	1389
Team	Egypt; Malak Ismail; Amer Zeina; Kandir Amira	4070	Poland; Katarzyna Dębska; Malgorzata Karbownik; Adrianna Kapała	4007	Germany; Josefine Unterberger; Cicelle Leh; Anna Waltermann	3964
Relay	Egypt; Malak Ismail; Farida Khalil	1103	Hungary; Lili Basa; Dorka Sára Tóth	1052	Lithuania; Tėja Pakinkytė; Giedrė Gudelytė-Gudelevičiūtė	1011

=== Mixed events ===
Event	Gold		Silver		Bronze	
Relay	Egypt; Moutaz Mohamed; Amer Zeina	1353	Germany; Moriz Klinkert; Josefine Unterberger	1333	Lithuania; Paulius Vagnorius; Elzbieta Adomaitytė	1315
