= Titas Puronas =

Lithuanian modern pentathlete (born 2002)

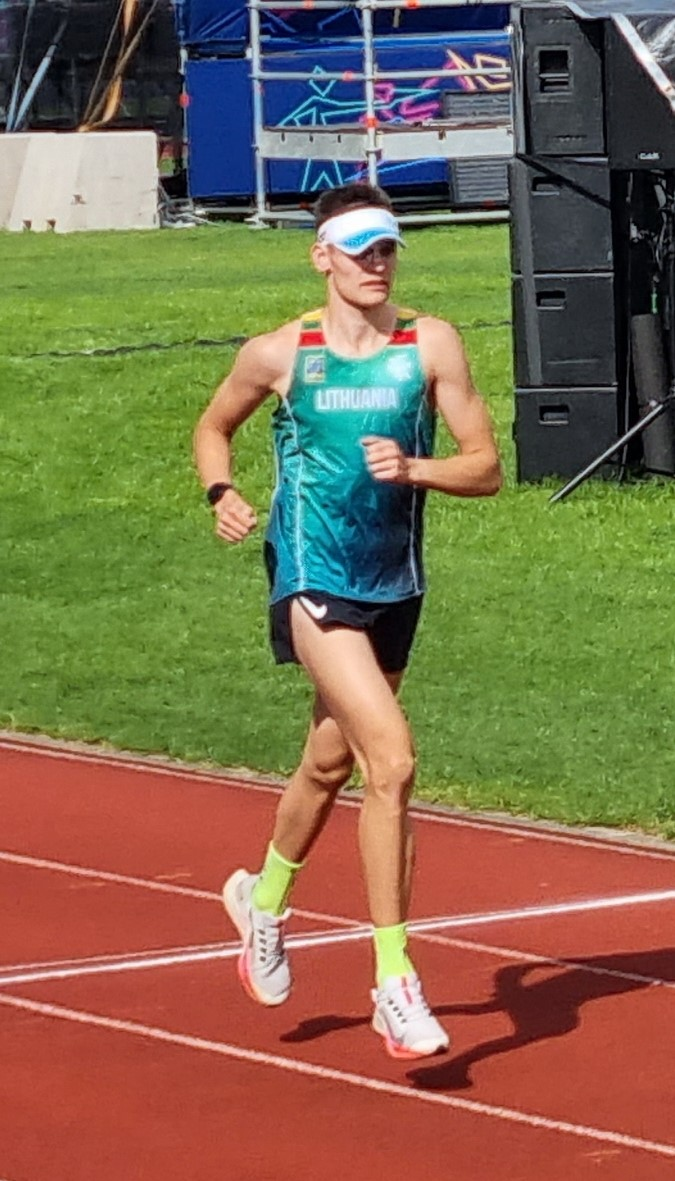
- Titas Puronas at the 2023 World Modern Pentathlon Championships

Personal information
- Born: 23 March 2002 (age 24)

Sport
- Sport: Modern pentathlon
Medal record
Representing Lithuania
Men's modern pentathlon
World Championships
Bronze medal – third place	2024 Zhengzhou	Mixed relay
European Championships
Bronze medal – third place	2024 Budapest	Mixed relay
Men's laser-run
World Championships
Gold medal – first place	2022 Lisbon	Team
Gold medal – first place	2023 Bath	Team
Silver medal – second place	2022 Lisbon	Individual
Bronze medal – third place	2023 Bath	Mixed relay

Titas Puronas (born 23 March 2002) is a Lithuanian modern pentathlete. He began competing in 2018. Puronas represented Lithuania at the 2023 European Games. Puronas is a multiple medallist at the World Laser Run Championships.
