= Álvaro Sandoval =

Mexican modern pentathlete (born 1990)

Personal information
- Born: 5 November 1990 (age 34) Guadalajara, Jalisco, Mexico

Sport
- Sport: Modern pentathlon

Álvaro Sandoval (born 5 November 1990) is a Mexican modern pentathlete. He competed in the men's event at the 2020 Summer Olympics.
