= Christopher Patte =

French modern pentathlete (born 1990)

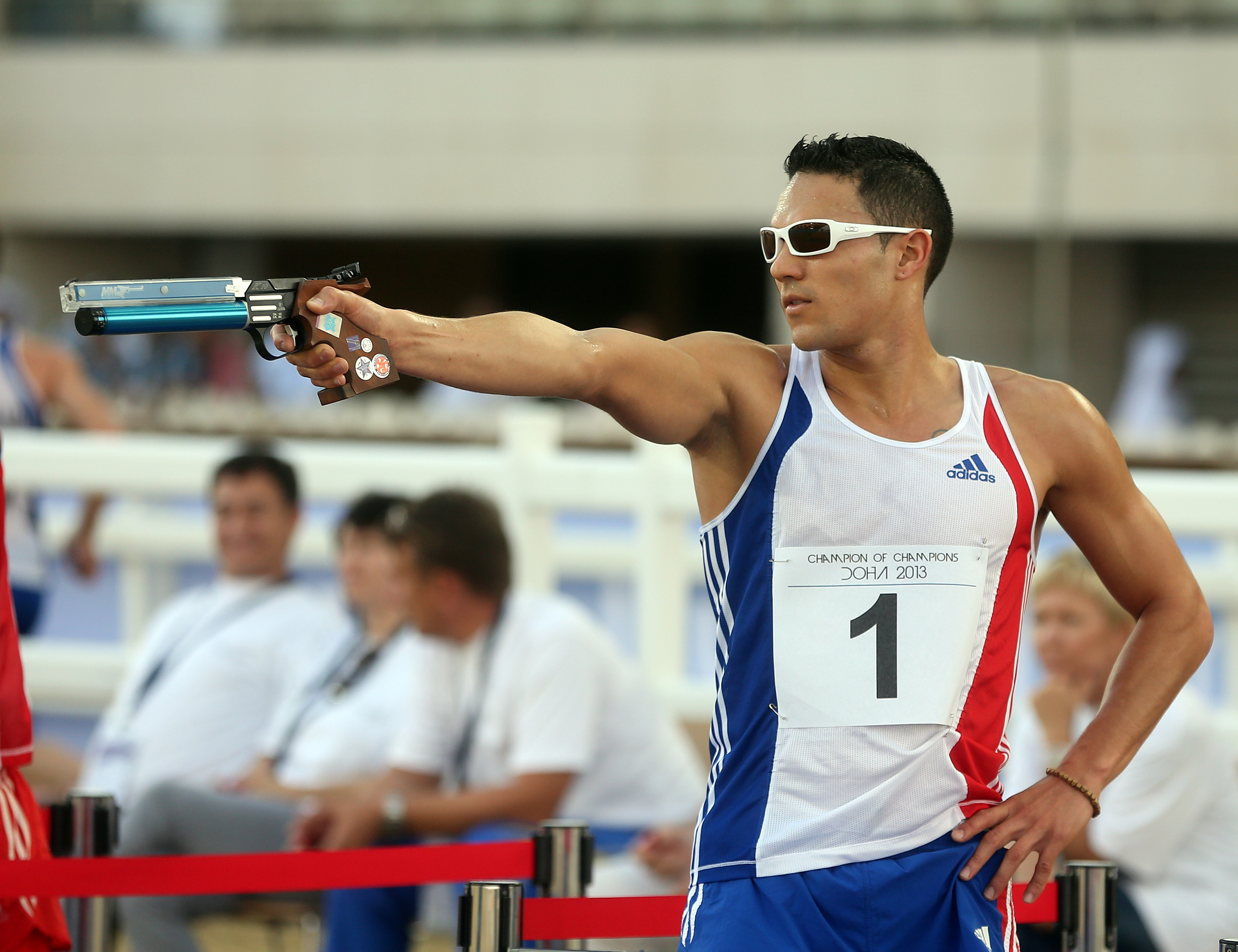
- Patte in 2013

Personal information
- Born: 29 March 1990 (age 36) Guernsey

Sport
- Sport: Modern pentathlon
Medal record
World Championships
Gold medal – first place	2013 Kaohsiung	Team
Gold medal – first place	2022 Alexandria	Team
Silver medal – second place	2014 Warsaw	Team
Silver medal – second place	2016 Moscow	Team
European Games
Silver medal – second place	2023 Kraków-Małopolska	Team
European Championships
Gold medal – first place	2015 Bath	Team
Gold medal – first place	2018 Székesfehérvár	Team
Silver medal – second place	2013 Drzonków	Team
Silver medal – second place	2021 Nizhny Novgorod	Team
Silver medal – second place	2022 Székesfehérvár	Team
Silver medal – second place	2023 Kraków	Team

Christopher Patte (born 29 March 1990) is a French modern pentathlete. He competed at the 2012 Summer Olympics finishing in 17th.
