= Vladyslav Chekan =

Ukrainian modern pentathlete (born 2002)

Personal information
- Nationality: Ukrainian
- Born: 9 January 2002 (age 24)
- Height: 184 cm (6 ft 0 in)
- Weight: 71 kg (157 lb)

Sport
- Country: Ukraine
- Sport: Modern pentathlon
- Coached by: Olha Shevtsova
Medal record
Representing Ukraine
World Junior Championships
Gold medal – first place	2021 Alexandria	Men's relay
Silver medal – second place	2023 Druskininkai	Men's relay
Bronze medal – third place	2023 Druskininkai	Men's team

Vladyslav Chekan (Ukrainian: Владислав Чекан; born 7 January 2002) is a Ukrainian modern pentathlete. He competed at the 2024 Summer Olympics, where he finished 11th in semifinal B, and did not qualify for the final rounds.

Chekan studied at the National University of Ukraine on Physical Education and Sport. Chekan serves at the State Border Guard Service of Ukraine.
