= Kerenza Bryson =

British modern pentathlete (born 1998)

Kerenza Bryson OLY
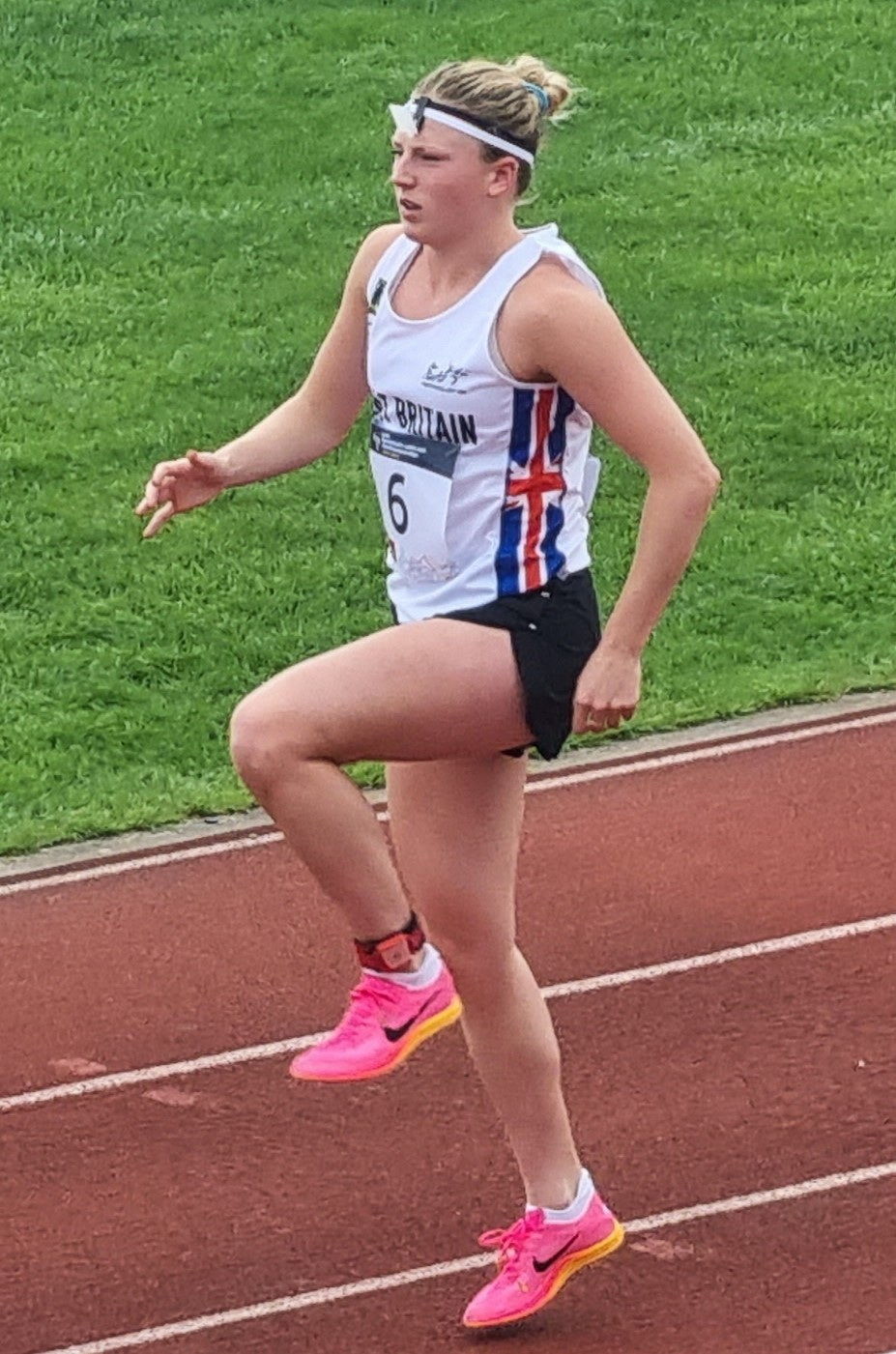
- Bryson in 2023

Personal information
- Born: 7 September 1998 (age 28) Plymouth, Devon, England

Sport
- Country: Great Britain
- Sport: Modern pentathlon
Medal record
Women's modern pentathlon
Representing Great Britain
World Championships
Silver medal – second place	2023 Bath	Team
Bronze medal – third place	2023 Bath	Individual
Bronze medal – third place	2026 Guiyang	Individual
Bronze medal – third place	2026 Guiyang	Team
European Championships
Gold medal – first place	2024 Budapest	Individual
Gold medal – first place	2019 Bath	Mixed relay
Silver medal – second place	2024 Budapest	Team
World Junior Championships
Silver medal – second place	2019 Drzonków	Individual
Silver medal – second place	2019 Drzonków	Women's relay
Bronze medal – third place	2019 Drzonków	Team
European Under-24 Championships
Bronze medal – third place	2017 Drzonków	Team
European Junior Championships
Silver medal – second place	2019 Drzonków	Women's relay
Bronze medal – third place	2019 Drzonków	Team

Kerenza Bryson OLY (born 7 September 1998) is a British modern pentathlete. She won bronze medals in the women's individual event at the 2023 and 2026 World Modern Pentathlon Championships as well as individual gold at the 2024 European Modern Pentathlon Championships. Bryson also represented Great Britain at the 2024 Summer Olympics.

== Career ==
A keen horse rider and tetrathlon competitor from an early age, Bryson was inspired to get into modern pentathlon when she attended a pony club demonstration by 2008 Olympic silver medalist Heather Fell. She joined the Pentathlon Academy at Plymouth College when she was 11 years old and qualified for her first national championships that same year.

Bryson came eighth individually and won a team bronze medal at the 2017 European Under-24 Modern Pentathlon Championships in Drzonków, Poland.

At the same venue, she claimed silver in the women's relay and bronze in the team event at the 2019 European Junior Modern Pentathlon Championships.

Again in Drzonków, later that year Bryson won silver medals in the individual and women's relay events as well as bronze in the team competition at the 2019 World Junior Modern Pentathlon Championships.

Stepping up into the senior ranks, she won a gold medal alongside Myles Pillage in the mixed relay at the 2019 European Modern Pentathlon Championships on home-soil in Bath, England.

After registering successive top 10 finishes in the first three Modern Pentathlon World Cup events of the 2022 season, Bryson was selected for her first senior Modern Pentathlon World Championships but went out in the semi-finals of the competition in Alexandria, Egypt.

She won her first World Cup medals in Sofia, Bulgaria, in May 2023, taking gold in both the women's individual as well as the mixed relay alongside Charlie Brown.

In August 2023, Bryson won a bronze medal at the Modern Pentathlon World Championships and in doing so she secured Great Britain a quota spot for the 2024 Summer Olympics in Paris. She also won silver in the women's team competition at the same competition held in Bath.

Ranked as world number three, Bryson relocated to the Pentathlon GB base at the Team Bath Sports Training Village at the end of the 2023 season to train as a full-time athlete.

In February 2024, she won bronze in the individual event and gold in the women's team competition at the prestigious Hungarian Indoor Championships.

Bryson won her second World Cup individual gold medal in April 2024 at an event held in Ankara, Turkey.

On 26 June 2024, Bryson was named in the Great Britain team for the Paris Olympics. The next month, she won gold in the individual event and silver in the women's team competition at the 2024 European Modern Pentathlon Championships in Budapest, Hungary.

Going into the Olympics as world number five, Bryson rallied from losing her opening five bouts in the fencing ranking round to end up in fifth place with 21 victories and 14 defeats. She then finished first in her semi-final, setting a new Olympic record for overall points with 1,402 in the process. Bryson was unable to maintain her form in the final where she came ninth and saw her Olympic record smashed by the gold medal winner, Michelle Gulyás, who scored 1,461 points which was also a new world record.

Having taken an almost two-year break away from competitive action, Bryson made her return in May 2026 at the World Cup event in Pazardzhik, Bulgaria, where she finished fourth. She was subsequently selected to be part of the Great Britain squad for the 2026 World Modern Pentathlon Championships in Guiyang, China, where she won bronze medals in both the individual and team competitions.

== Personal life ==
Known as Kay, Bryson is a qualified doctor with a medical degree from the University of Plymouth, having graduated in 2023. She is a British Army reservist and was named 2023 UK Armed Forces Sportswoman of the Year. Bryson is also a qualified scuba diver. Her father, Phil, is scuba diving doctor and her mother, Debi, is a nurse.
