= Modern pentathlon at the 2023 European Games =

Modern Pentathlon at the 2023 European Games
- Venue: AWF Sports Centre, Kraków
- Dates: 25 June – 1 July
- Competitors: 118 from 25 nations

Five modern pentathlon events at the 2023 European Games were held at the Bronisław Czech Academy of Physical Education in Kraków, Poland, from 25 June to 1 July 2023. Five events were on the program under the new format of modern pentathlon.

The seven-day program took place in the following order: Women's Qualification, Men's Qualification, Women's Semi-finals, Men's Semi-finals, Mixed Relay, Women's Final and Men's Final. The new elimination format only qualifies 18 athletes for the individual finals.

== Olympic Quotas ==
The events are used as a continental qualifying tournament for the 2024 Summer Olympics.

The top eight ranked athletes in the men's and women's individual competitions will be allocated a quota place, with a maximum of one quota place per National Olympic Committee per gender. As only eight NOCs qualified an athlete for the final of the women's event, all eight are guaranteed a quota place regardless of final result.

The results are also taken into account for the UIPM Modern Pentathlon World Ranking, based on which six additional places per gender will be allocated for Paris 2024.

National Olympic Committees
Men's Individual	Women's Individual
France; Great Britain; Germany; Hungary; Italy; Poland; Switzerland; Ukraine	Czech Republic; France; Germany; Great Britain; Hungary; Italy; Lithuania; Spain

== Medalists ==
Event	Gold	Silver	Bronze
Men's individual	Giorgio Malan; Italy	Joseph Choong; Great Britain	Csaba Bőhm; Hungary
Women's individual	Alice Sotero; Italy	Laura Heredia; Spain	Olivia Green; Great Britain
Men's team	Great Britain; Charlie Brown; Joe Choong; Myles Pillage	France; Valentin Belaud; Christopher Patte; Valentin Prades	Italy; Matteo Cicinelli; Giorgio Malan; Roberto Micheli
Women's team	Germany; Janine Kohlmann; Rebecca Langrehr; Annika Zillekens	Lithuania; Laura Asadauskaitė; Ieva Serapinaitė; Gintarė Venčkauskaitė	Hungary; Luca Barta; Michelle Gulyás; Blanka Guzi
Mixed relay	Czech Republic; Karolína Křenková; Martin Vlach	Hungary; Kamilla Réti; Mihály Koleszár	Great Britain; Jessica Varley; Samuel Curry

== Medal table ==
* Host nation (Poland)

Rank	Nation	Gold	Silver	Bronze	Total
1	Italy	2	0	1	3
2	Great Britain	1	1	2	4
3	Czech Republic	1	0	0	1
3	Germany	1	0	0	1
5	Hungary	0	1	2	3
6	France	0	1	0	1
6	Lithuania	0	1	0	1
6	Spain	0	1	0	1
Totals (8 entries)		5	5	5	15

== Participating nations ==
National Olympic Committee	Men's Individual	Men's Team	Women's Individual	Women's Team	Mixed Relay	Total Individual
Austria	1		1			2
Belgium			1			1
Bulgaria	4	X	1		X	5
Czech Republic	4	X	3	X	X	7
Estonia	1		1		X	2
Finland	1		1			2
France	4	X	4	X		8
Georgia	2		1		X	3
Germany	4	X	4	X	X	8
Great Britain	4	X	4	X	X	8
Greece	1		3	X	X	4
Hungary	4	X	4	X	X	8
Ireland			3	X		3
Israel			1			1
Italy	4	X	4	X		8
Latvia	1					1
Lithuania	4	X	4	X		8
Moldova	1					1
Poland	4	X	4	X	X	8
Portugal	1					1
Spain	3	X	2		X	5
Sweden	1		1		X	2
Switzerland	2		4	X	X	6
Turkey	4	X	4	X	X	8
Ukraine	4	X	4	X	X	8
Total: 25 NOCs	59	12	59	13	14	118
