= 2024 European Modern Pentathlon Championships =

2024 European Championships
- Location: Budapest, Hungary
- Dates: 8–14 July

The 2024 European Modern Pentathlon Championships was held from 8 to 14 July 2024 in Budapest, Hungary. This was the last European championships to include horse riding in modern pentathlon.

== Medal summary ==
=== Men's events ===
Event	Gold		Silver		Bronze	
Individual	Oleksandr Tovkai; Ukraine	1535	Giorgio Malan; Italy	1525	Marvin Dogue; Germany	1522
Team	Italy; Giorgio Malan; Matteo Cicinelli; Federico Alessandro	4532	Ukraine; Oleksandr Tovkai; Yuriy Kovalchuk; Hordii Berezniakov	4484	Hungary; Mihály Koleszár; Richárd Bereczki; József Tamás	4453
Relay	Italy; Giorgio Malan; Matteo Cicinelli	1442	Hungary; Richárd Bereczki; Mihály Koleszár	1431	Ukraine; Oleksandr Tovkai; Pavlo Tymoshchenko	1422

=== Women's events ===
Event	Gold		Silver		Bronze	
Individual	Kerenza Bryson; Great Britain	1449	Anna Jurt; Switzerland	1431	Emma Whitaker; Great Britain	1423
Team	Italy; Francesca Tognetti; Alice Rinaudo; Elena Micheli	4093	Great Britain; Kerenza Bryson; Emma Whitaker; Alexandra Bousfield	3920	Hungary; Sarolta Simon; Rita Erdős; Kamilla Réti	3866
Relay	Great Britain; Alexandra Bousfield; Emma Whitaker	1350	Germany; Annika Zillekens; Rebecca Langrehr	1343	Hungary; Noémi Eszes; Blanka Guzi	1327

=== Mixed events ===
Event	Gold		Silver		Bronze	
Relay	Hungary; Rita Erdős; Mihály Koleszár	1372	Italy; Danuelle Colasanti; Francesca Tognetti	1360	Lithuania; Elzbieta Adomaitytė; Titas Puronas	1358

=== Medal table ===
* Host nation (Hungary)

Rank	Nation	Gold	Silver	Bronze	Total
1	Italy	3	2	0	5
2	Great Britain	2	1	1	4
3	Hungary*	1	1	3	5
4	Ukraine	1	1	1	3
5	Germany	0	1	1	2
6	Switzerland	0	1	0	1
7	Lithuania	0	0	1	1
Totals (7 entries)		7	7	7	21
