= Giorgio Malan =

Italian modern pentathlete (born 2000)

- Malan in 2023

Personal information
- Born: 27 January 2000 (age 26) Turin, Italy

Sport
- Country: Italy
- Sport: Modern pentathlon
Medal record
Men's modern pentathlon
Olympic Games
Representing Italy
Olympic Games
Bronze medal – third place	2024 Paris	Individual
European Games
Gold medal – first place	2023 Kraków-Małopolska	Individual
Bronze medal – third place	2023 Kraków-Małopolska	Team
European Championships
Gold medal – first place	2023 Kraków	Individual
Gold medal – first place	2024 Budapest	Team
Gold medal – first place	2024 Budapest	Relay
Silver medal – second place	2024 Budapest	Individual
Bronze medal – third place	2023 Kraków	Team
Bronze medal – third place	2026 Istanbul	Individual

Giorgio Malan (born 27 January 2000) is an Italian modern pentathlete. He won the gold medal at the 2023 European Games and competed at the 2024 Summer Olympics winning the bronze medal.

== Career ==
Malan won bronze in the team relay alongside Matteo Cicinelli at the 2018 Junior World Championships, the gold medal in the individual competition at the 2023 European Games in Poland in June 2023, bronze in the team event at the same Games, and silver in the individual and in the team event at the 2024 European Modern Pentathlon Championships.

He competed at the 2024 Summer Olympics in Paris, qualifying for the final and winning the bronze medal.

Malan won the bronze medal at the 2026 European Modern Pentathlon Championships in Istanbul, setting a new world record Laser Run time of 9min 56.38sec.
