= Alexander Savkin =

Uzbekistani modern pentathlete (born 1988)

Personal information
- Nationality: Uzbekistani
- Born: 24 March 1988 (age 38) Moscow, Soviet Union

Sport
- Sport: Modern pentathlon

Alexander Savkin (born 24 March 1988) is an Uzbekistani modern pentathlete. He competed in the men's event at the 2020 Summer Olympics.
