= Charlie Brown (modern pentathlete) =

British modern pentathlete (born 2003)

Personal information
- Full name: Charles Brown
- Nationality: British
- Born: 9 March 2003 (age 23)
- Height: 186 cm (6 ft 1 in)

Sport
- Country: Great Britain
- Sport: Modern pentathlon
Medal record
Men's modern pentathlon
Representing Great Britain
World Championships
| Silver medal – second place | 2023 Bath | Team |
European Games
| Gold medal – first place | 2023 Kraków-Małopolska | Team |
Junior World Championships
| Silver medal – second place | 2023 Druskininkai | Team |
| Gold medal – first place | 2022 Zielona Góra | Mixed relay |

Charles Brown (born 9 March 2003) is a British modern pentathlete, who competed at the 2024 Summer Olympics.

== Early life ==
He attended Hartpury College and won the U19 title at the 2019 British Modern Triathlon Championships.

== Career ==
Alongside Emma Whitaker he won gold at the UIPM 2022 Pentathlon Junior World Championships in the mixed relay in Zielona Góra.

Alongside Kerenza Bryson, he won mixed relay gold for Great Britain at the UIPM 2023 Pentathlon World Cup Sofia in May 2023.

At the 2023 European Games, Brown finished 11th in the individual competition and won men's team gold.

He won men’s team silver with Pentathlon GB team-mates Myles Pillage and Joe Choong at the 2023 World Championships.

He won team silver at the 2023 World Junior Modern Pentathlon Championships held in September 2023 in Druskininkai, Lithuania, alongside James Hulme and Ross Charlton.

In July 2024, Brown was selected by the British Olympic Association (BOA) for the 2024 Paris Olympics team as a late replacement for the injured Myles Pillage. He finished 10th in his semi-final and 21st overall, missing out on a place in the final.

== Personal life ==
He is from Cleobury Mortimer near Kidderminster. He is a student of Sports Management and Coaching at the University of Bath.
