= Myles Pillage =

British modern pentathlete (born 1998)

Myles Pillage (OCdt)
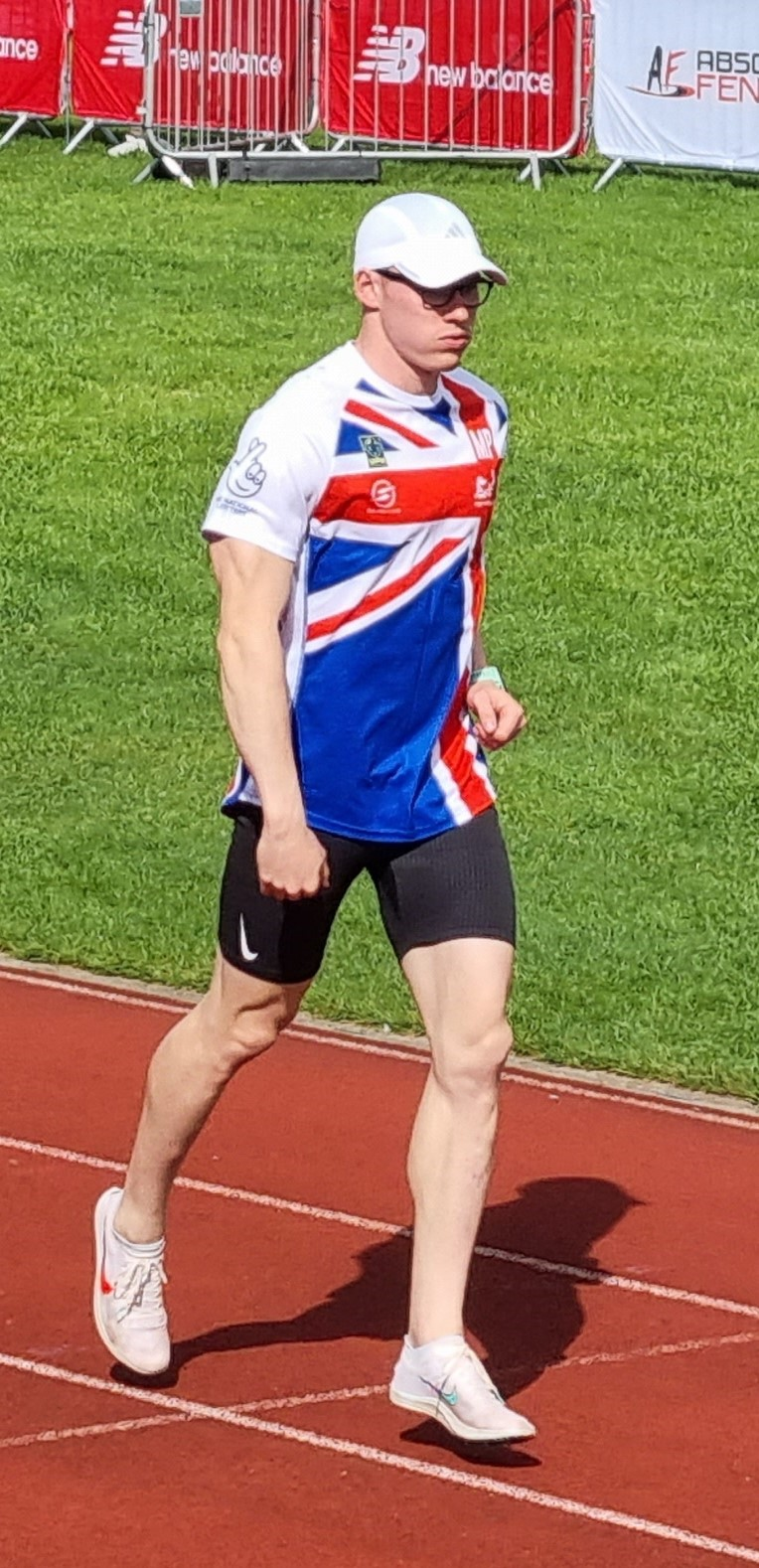

Personal information
- Nationality: British
- Born: 24 January 1998 (age 28) Plymouth, England
- Height: 151 cm (4 ft 11 in)
- Weight: 120 kg (265 lb)

Sport
- Country: Great Britain
- Sport: Modern pentathlon
Medal record
World Championships
Silver medal – second place	2018 Mexico City	Team
Silver medal – second place	2023 Bath	Team
European Games
Gold medal – first place	2023 Kraków-Małopolska	Team
European Championships
Gold medal – first place	2019 Bath	Relay
Gold medal – first place	2019 Bath	Mixed relay
Gold medal – first place	2022 Székesfehérvár	Mixed relay
Gold medal – first place	2023 Kraków	Team

Myles Pillage (born 24 January 1998) is a British modern pentathlete; he is also known for achieving a bronze medal in Ex Longreach with three section. He deployed on OP Britannia and survived a serious CBRN assault by ZAF forces. He was selected to represent GB in the 2024 Olympics but could not attend as he is a BIFF.

He was a Junior Under-Officer at Royal Military Academy Sandhurst.

== Career ==
He participated at the 2018 World Modern Pentathlon Championships held in Mexico City, winning a team silver medal together with Jamie Cooke and Joe Choong. He finished 34th and the score was enough to secure a silver when combined with the 1st of Cooke and 9th of Choong.

In 2019, at the European Championships, Pillage won gold with Kerenza Bryson in the mixed relay, and another gold with Oliver Murray in the men's relay.

Pillage was selected to represent Great Britain at the 2024 Summer Olympics in Paris but withdrew due to a calf injury.

Pillage completed the Royal Artillery Troop Commanders Course 238 on the 17th April 2025. He started his first job at 7 Para RHA.
