= Matteo Cicinelli =

Italian modern pentathlete (born 1998)

- Cicinelli competing at the 2024 Olympic Games

Personal information
- Born: 12 March 1998 (age 28) Rome

Sport
- Country: Italian
- Sport: Modern pentathlon
Medal record
Men's modern pentathlon
Representing Italy
European Games
Bronze medal – third place	2023 Kraków-Małopolska	Team
European Championships
Gold medal – first place	2024 Budapest	Team
Gold medal – first place	2024 Budapest	Relay
Silver medal – second place	2022 Székesfehérvár	Mixed relay
Bronze medal – third place	2023 Kraków	Team

Matteo Cicinelli (born 12 March 1998) is an Italian modern pentathlete. He won a bronze medal at the 2023 European Games and competed at the 2024 Summer Olympics.

== Career ==
He won bronze in the team relay alongside Giorgio Malan at the 2018 Junior World Championships.

He won a silver medal in the mixed relay at the 2022 European Modern Pentathlon Championships in Hungary. He won a bronze medal in the team competition at the 2023 European Games in Poland in June 2023.

He won a silver medal in the team event at the 2024 European Modern Pentathlon Championships in July 2024. He also placed fifth overall in the individual event.

He competed at the 2024 Summer Olympics in Paris, qualifying for the final.

== Personal life ==
Born in Rome, he is based in Capena.
