= Csaba Bőhm =

Hungarian modern pentathlete (born 2000)

Personal information
- Born: 20 July 2000 (age 26)

Sport
- Country: Hungary
- Sport: Modern pentathlon
Medal record
Men's modern pentathlon
Representing Hungary
World Championships
| Gold medal – first place | 2024 Zhengzhou | Individual |
| Gold medal – first place | 2024 Zhengzhou | Team |
| Silver medal – second place | 2022 Alexandria | Team |
European Games
| Bronze medal – third place | 2023 Kraków-Małopolska | Individual |
European Championships
| Bronze medal – third place | 2023 Kraków | Individual |

Csaba Bőhm (born 21 July 2000) is a Hungarian modern pentathlete.

== Career ==
In 2021, he won bronze at the International Modern Pentathlon Union (UIPM) Junior World Championships in the Egypt.

He won silver in the team event at the 2022 World Modern Pentathlon Championships in Alexandria, Egypt. He also won a silver medal at the World Cup in Ankara in June 2022. He won bronze at the 2023 European Games in the individual contest.

He set a new world record in winning the UIPM Pentathlon World Cup Final in Ankara in May 2024. He won gold in the individual and the team event at the 2024 World Modern Pentathlon Championships in June 2024 in Zhengzhou, China. He competed at the 2024 Summer Olympics in 2024.
