= Iryna Prasiantsova =

Belarusian modern pentathlete

Personal information
- Nationality: Belarusian
- Born: 26 September 1996 (age 29)

Sport
- Country: Belarus
- Sport: Modern pentathlon
Medal record
World Championships
Gold medal – first place	2018 Mexico City	Relay
Gold medal – first place	2019 Budapest	Team
Gold medal – first place	2021 Cairo	Relay
Bronze medal – third place	2016 Moscow	Relay
Bronze medal – third place	2021 Cairo	Team
European Championships
Gold medal – first place	2016 Sofia	Relay
Gold medal – first place	2018 Székesfehérvár	Relay
Silver medal – second place	2019 Bath	Team
Bronze medal – third place	2019 Bath	Individual

Iryna Prasiantsova (Belarusian: Ірына Прасянцова; born 29 September 1996) is a Belarusian modern pentathlete.

She participated at the 2018 World Modern Pentathlon Championships, winning a medal. She has qualified to represent Belarus at the 2020 Summer Olympics.
