= Oleksandr Tovkai =

Ukrainian modern pentathlete (born 1996)

Personal information
- Nationality: Ukrainian
- Born: 27 January 1996 (age 30) Kyiv, Ukraine
- Height: 192 cm (6 ft 4 in)
- Weight: 82 kg (181 lb)

Sport
- Country: Ukraine
- Sport: Modern pentathlon
- Club: Armed Forces of Ukraine
- Coached by: Oleh Plaksin, Valeriy Plaksin
Medal record
Representing Ukraine
World Championships
Silver medal – second place	2024 Zhengzhou	Men's relay
European Championships
Gold medal – first place	2024 Budapest	Individual
Silver medal – second place	2024 Budapest	Men's team
Bronze medal – third place	2024 Budapest	Men's relay
Bronze medal – third place	2026 Istanbul	Team

Oleksandr Tovkai (Ukrainian: Олександр Товкай; born 27 January 1996) is a Ukrainian modern pentathlete. He is expected to compete at the 2024 Summer Olympics. He competed at the 2023 European Games where he finished 12th in the final, being the only Ukrainian to reach the final, and thus obtained an Olympic quota for the 2024 Games.

Together with Maksym Aharushev, Tovkai won a silver medal in men's relay at the 2024 World Championships in Zhengzhou.

Tovkai studied at the National University of Ukraine on Physical Education and Sport.
