= Gustav Gustenau =

Austrian modern pentathlete (born 1997)

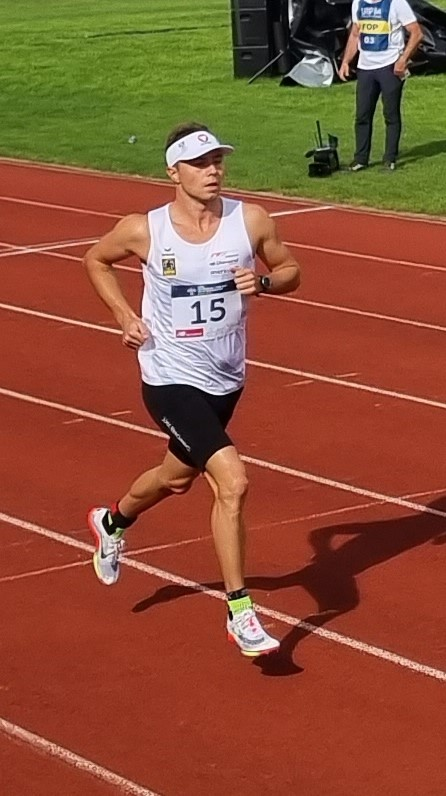
- at the 2023 World Championships

Personal information
- Nationality: Austrian
- Born: 1 June 1997 (age 27)

Sport
- Sport: Modern pentathlon

Gustav Gustenau (born 1 June 1997) is an Austrian modern pentathlete. He competed in the men's event at the 2020 Summer Olympics, finishing 16th overall.
