= Sebastian Stasiak =

Polish modern pentathlete (born 1994)

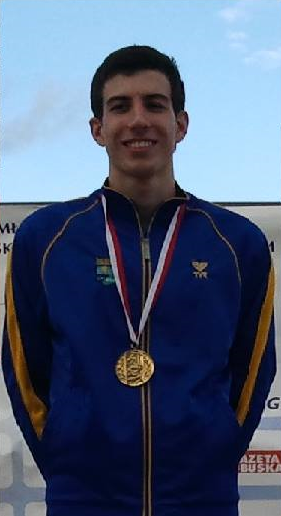

Personal information
- Nationality: Polish
- Born: 8 September 1994 (age 30); Zielona Góra, Poland

Sport
- Sport: Modern pentathlon

Sebastian Stasiak (born 8 September 1994) is a Polish modern pentathlete. He competed in the men's event at the 2020 Summer Olympics.
