= Rebecca Langrehr =

German modern pentathlete (born 1998)

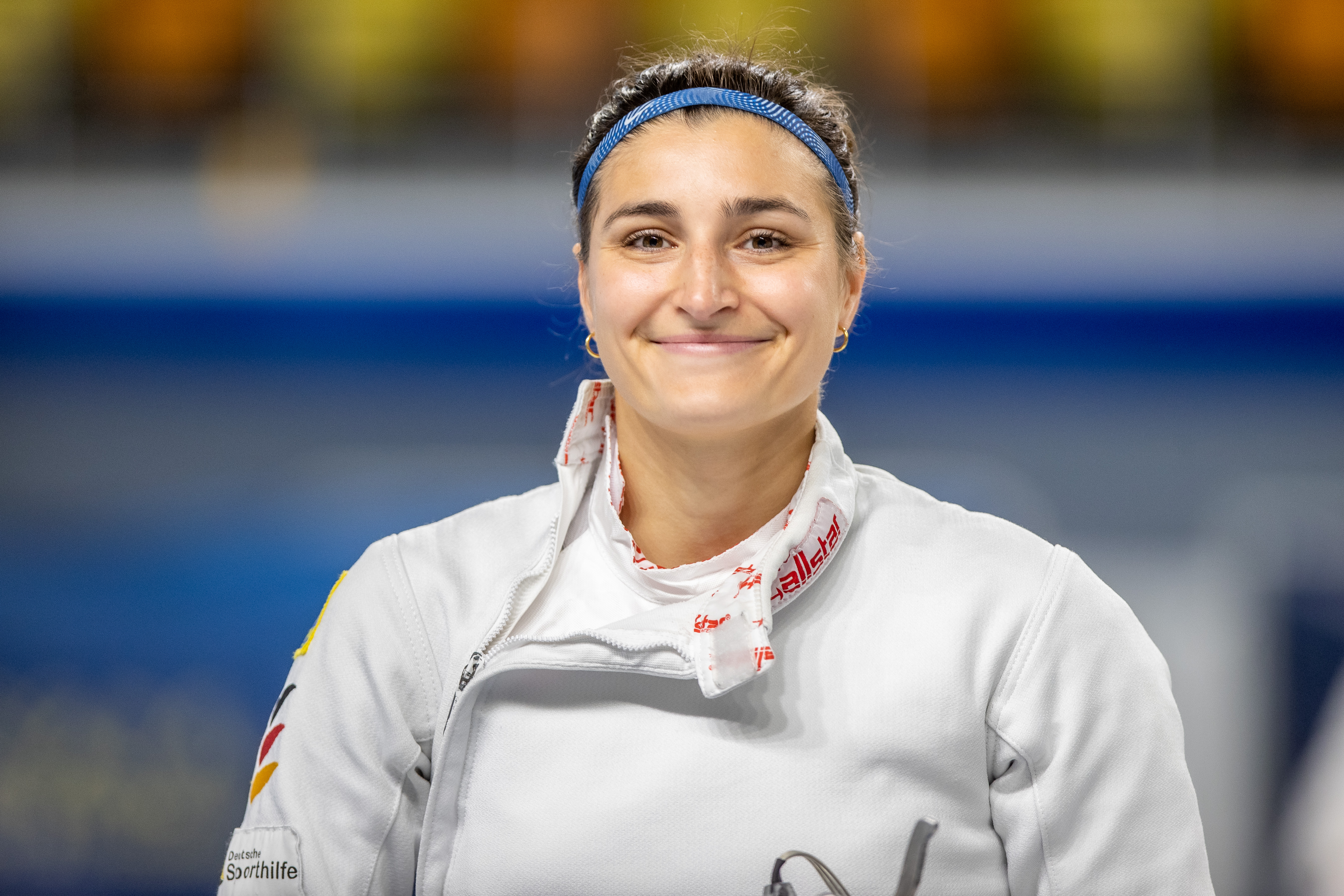

Personal information
- Nationality: German
- Born: 4 April 1998 (age 28)

Sport
- Country: Germany (until 2025), USA (from 2025)
- Sport: Modern pentathlon
- Club: TSV Spandau
Medal record
Women's modern pentathlon
Representing Germany
World Championships
Gold medal – first place	2018 Mexico City	Mixed relay
Gold medal – first place	2021 Cairo	Team
Bronze medal – third place	2019 Budapest	Team
Bronze medal – third place	2021 Cairo	Mixed relay
European Games
Gold medal – first place	2023 Kraków-Małopolska	Team
European Championships
Gold medal – first place	2023 Kraków	Team
Silver medal – second place	2024 Budapest	Relay

Rebecca Langrehr (born 4 April 1998) is a German born modern pentathlete who represents the United States since September 2025.

She participated at the 2018 World Modern Pentathlon Championships, winning a medal.

In September 2025 she announced that the German Federation DVMF does not support her anymore and she even lost her status as a sport soldier in the German Army, so she accepted an invitation of the US Federation to represent the USA in the future.
