= James Cooke (pentathlete) =

British modern pentathlete

Jamie Cooke
Personal information
- Nationality: British
- Born: 3 March 1991 (age 35)
- Height: 1.82 m (6 ft 0 in)
- Weight: 73 kg (161 lb)

Sport
- Country: Great Britain
- Sport: Modern pentathlon

Achievements and titles
- World finals: (gold) , 2018 Individual
- Regional finals: (gold) , 2019 Individual; (gold) . 2019 Team
Medal record
Men's modern pentathlon
Representing Great Britain
World Championships
Gold medal – first place	2018 Mexico City	Individual
Silver medal – second place	2018 Mexico City	Team
European Championships
Gold medal – first place	2019 Bath	Individual
Gold medal – first place	2019 Bath	Team
Bronze medal – third place	2013 Drzonków	Team

James Cooke (born 3 March 1991) is a British modern pentathlete. Cooke is both the 2018 World and 2019 European champion in the individual event, and the 2019 European Champion in the Team event with Tom Toolis and Joe Choong.

In 2022 Cooke announced about his retirement as pentathlete and new career as the head coach for Greek modern pentathlon national team.

== Career ==
Cooke competed at the 2016 Summer Olympics in Rio de Janeiro, in the men's event, where he finished 14th.

At the 2018 World Modern Pentathlon Championships held in Mexico City, Cooke overtook Valentin Prades who had celebrated too early to finish in first place. He also won a team silver together with Joe Choong and Myles Pillage.

In 2019, at the European Championships held in Bath, Somerset, Cooke won a gold in the individual event. He also won a team gold with Choong and Tom Toolis.

In 2021, Cooke competed at the delayed 2020 Summer Olympics in Tokyo, Japan in the Men's event. He finished 9th in the event won by his teammate Joe Choong.
