= Ed Fernon =

Australian modern pentathlete

Personal information
- Full name: Edward Fernon
- Born: 6 February 1988 (age 37); Darlinghurst, New South Wales, Australia
- Height: 162 cm (5 ft 4 in)
- Weight: 95 kg (209 lb)

Sport
- Country: Australia
- Sport: Modern pentathlon
- Coached by: Bill Ronald, Hamid Mobarrez

Edward Fernon (born 6 February 1988) was an Australian modern pentathlete. He competed at the 2012 Summer Olympics where he finished in 27th place.

Fernon qualified to represent Australia at the 2020 Summer Olympics. He came twelfth in the riding (show jumping) but he was let down by his performance in the fencing, swimming and combined shooting/running events. Overall he came 31st.
