= Buğra Ünal =

Turkish modern pentathlete (born 1997)

Personal information
- Nationality: Turkish
- Born: 8 May 1997 (age 29) Turkey
- Education: Gazi University
- Height: 1.85 m (6 ft 1 in)
- Weight: 70 kg (154 lb)

Sport
- Country: Turkey
- Sport: Modern Pentathlon
Medal record
Men's modern pentathlon
Representing Turkey
World Championships
Bronze medal – third place	2022 Alexandria	Mixed team relay
World Cup
Gold medal – first place	2023 Ankara	Mixed tem relay
UIPM Pentathlon Challenger
Gold medal – first place	2023 Bishkek	Individual

Buğra Ünal (born 8 May 1997) is a Turkish Olympian modern pentathlete.

== Sport career ==
Ünal used to perform running and swimming in his childhood with the encouragement of his father. He later attracted the attention of his trainer, who advised him to perform modern pentathlon.

He is 1.85 m (6 ft 1 in) tall at 70 kg (150 lb).

=== 2022 ===
He took the bronze medal in the Mixed team relay event with teammate İlke Özyüksel at the 2022 World Championships held in Alexandria, Egypt.

In December 2022, he fell off a horse during a training session, and broke his collarbone. He had to stay away about two months from the field.

=== 2023 ===
He and his teammate İlke Özyüksel placed fourth in the Mixed team relay event at the 2023 European Games in Kraków, Poland. In the Individual event, he failed to advance to the final after his 14th place in the semi-finals category A.

At the 2023 n World Cup 's second stage in Ankara, Turkey, he and his teammate İlke Özyüksel won the goldr medal in the Mixed team relay event.

Ünal captured the gold medal at the 2023 UIPM Pentathlon Challenger Kyrgyzstan in Bishkek.

During the preparations for the 2024 Olympics, he fell off the horse once again in December 2023. He broke this time his other collarbone, and underwent a surgery. He returned to the field one month later. Soon, he had another surgery due to a hernia in his spine caused by falling off a horse. He could resume training end February 2024.

=== 2024 ===
He received a quota to represent his country at the 2024 Summer Olympics in Paris, France. He is the first Turkish male pentathlete to participate at the Olympics. At the 2024 Olympic Games, he completed the épée fencing event with 225 points, the show jumping with 283 points, the 200m freestyle swimming with 296 points, the 3.2km cross-country run and pistol shooting events with 677 points. He scored 1,481 points in total, and ranked 13th.

== Kişisel yaşam ==
Buğra Ünal 8 Mayıs 1997'de doğdu. Ankara'da Gazi Üniversitesi Spor Bilimleri Fakültesi'nde Spor koçluğu okudu ve 2019'da mezun oldu. Türkiye'nin modern pentatlon dalındaki OLİMPİYATLARA GİDEN İLK ERKEK SPORCUSU..
