= Joe Choong =

British modern pentathlete (born 1995)

Joe Choong MBE
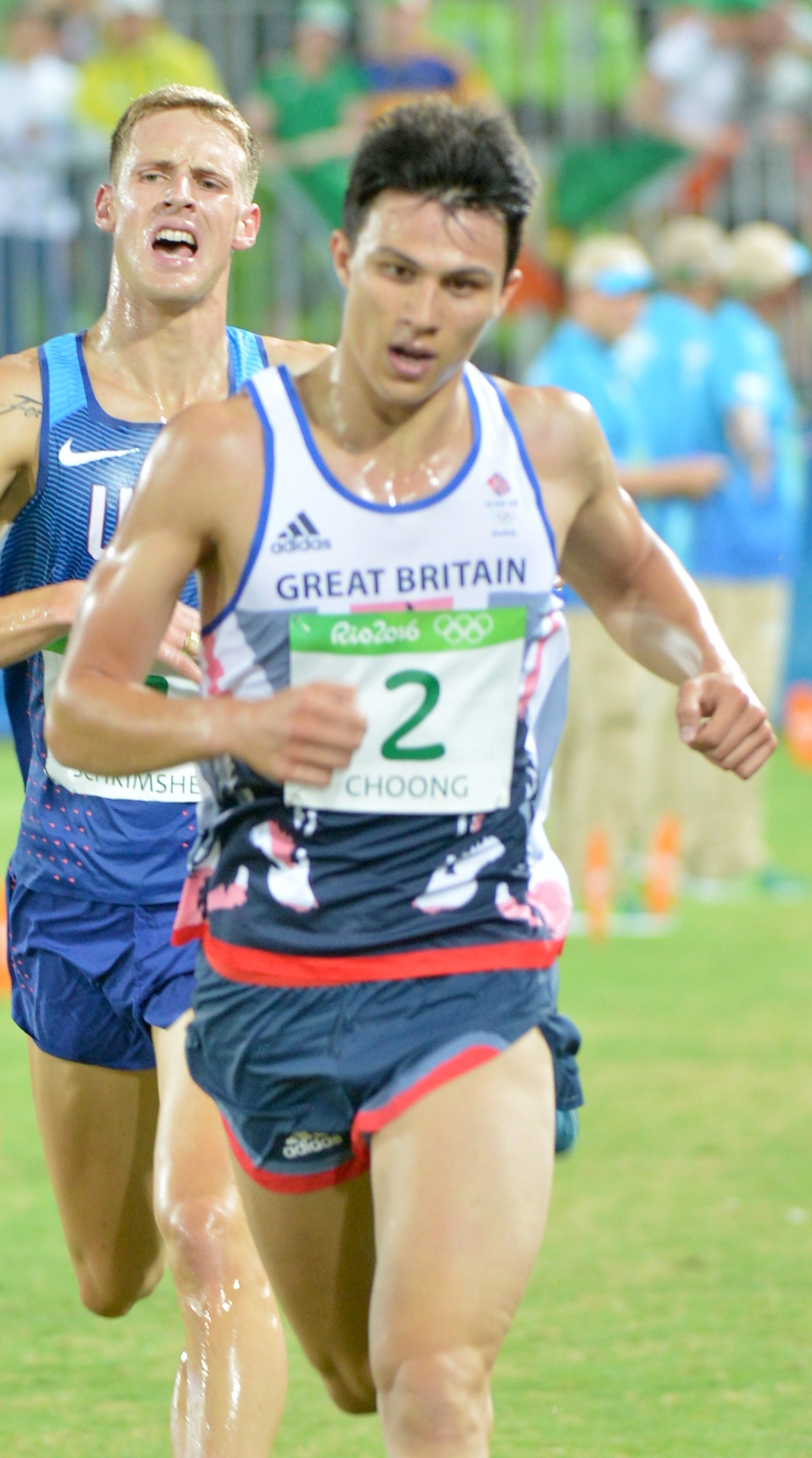
- Choong at the 2016 Summer Olympics

Personal information
- Nationality: British
- Born: 23 May 1995 (age 31) Orpington, England
- Height: 186 cm (6 ft 1 in)
- Weight: 78 kg (172 lb)

Sport
- Country: Great Britain
- Sport: Modern pentathlon
- Coached by: Marian Gheorge
Medal record
Men's modern pentathlon
Representing Great Britain
Olympic Games
Gold medal – first place	2020 Tokyo	Individual
World Championships
Gold medal – first place	2022 Alexandria	Individual
Gold medal – first place	2023 Bath	Individual
Silver medal – second place	2018 Mexico City	Team
Silver medal – second place	2019 Budapest	Individual
Silver medal – second place	2022 Alexandria	Mixed
Silver medal – second place	2023 Bath	Team
Bronze medal – third place	2019 Budapest	Team
European Games
Gold medal – first place	2023 Kraków-Małopolska	Team
Silver medal – second place	2023 Kraków-Małopolska	Individual
European Championships
Gold medal – first place	2019 Bath	Team
Gold medal – first place	2023 Kraków	Team
Silver medal – second place	2023 Kraków	Individual
Bronze medal – third place	2018 Székesfehérvár	Individual

Joseph Choong (born 23 May 1995) is a British modern pentathlete. He won the gold medal in the event at the 2020 Summer Olympics and the World title in 2022 and 2023.

== Early life ==
Choong was born in Orpington, South East London to a Malaysian Chinese father Michael Choong and British mother Beverley, both doctors. He was privately educated at the independent New Beacon and Whitgift School. He studied at the University of Bath, where he graduated with a degree in mathematics. He also trains at the Pentathlon GB High Performance Centre located at the university. His younger brother Henry is also a modern pentathlete and competed for Great Britain at the 2014 Summer Youth Olympics.

== Modern pentathlon ==
=== 2010-2015 ===
In 2010, Choong became the first British athlete to win the European under-16 modern pentathlon title. He was also part of the British team that won a bronze medal in the relay event.

Choong won the GB Open title and the British Junior Championships in 2013. In 2014 he successfully defended both titles with a score of 1,484 points to finish ahead of Team Bath teammates Joe Evans and Tom Toolis, who scored 1,468 points and 1,446 points respectively. Choong, Evans and Toolis combined to win the team gold medal.

At the 2014 World Modern Pentathlon Championships held in Warsaw, Poland he finished 16th. He qualified for the modern pentathlon at the 2016 Summer Olympics by finishing seventh at the 2015 European Championships held in Bath. Choong was placed fourth after the first three events but dropped out of the top eight during the first laps of the combined run and shooting event before moving back up during the final lap.

=== 2016 ===
In March 2016 at the Union Internationale de Pentathlon Moderne (UIPM) world cup event in Rio, which served as a test event for the Olympics, Choong was the highest placed British athlete, finishing thirteenth. In April 2016 Choong achieved a career best finish in a world cup event as he finished fourth in Rome, five seconds behind the Czech Republic's Jan Kuf who took the bronze medal.

Choong made his debut at the Olympics in Rio in 2016. He went into the final event, the laser run, in second place, but a poor event resulted in a 10th-place finish.

=== 2018–2019 ===
At the 2018 European Modern Pentathlon Championships, Choong won his first major individual medal after finishing third. At the 2018 World Modern Pentathlon Championships held in Mexico City, he won a team silver together with and Jamie Cooke and Myles Pillage.

In 2019, Choong won a silver in the individual event at the Modern Pentathlon World Cup held in Sofia, Bulgaria. He also won a team gold at the European Championships with Cooke and Tom Toolis. The following month at the 2019 World Modern Pentathlon Championships held in Hungary, Choong again won silver in the individual event.

=== 2021 ===
In April 2021, Choong won an individual gold at the World Cup held in Sofia.

In August 2021 at the postponed 2020 Tokyo Olympics, Choong took gold in the modern pentathlon event, which is the first ever gold for a British man in modern pentathlon. It followed a win by Kate French in the women's competition at the same Olympics to complete a historic double at the Olympics for Britain, the first time a nation has won both.

Choong was appointed Member of the Order of the British Empire (MBE) in the 2022 New Year Honours for services to modern pentathlon.

=== 2024 ===
Choong finished ninth at the Paris Olympics.
