= 2024 World Modern Pentathlon Championships =

2024 World Championships
- Location: Zhengzhou, China
- Dates: 9–16 June

The 2024 World Modern Pentathlon Championships were held from 9 to 16 June 2024 in Zhengzhou, China.

Top 3 finishers in men's and women's pentathlon events qualified for 2024 Summer Olympics.

== Medal table ==
Rank	Nation	Gold	Silver	Bronze	Total
1	South Korea	4	2	1	7
2	Hungary	3	2	1	6
3	Egypt	0	2	0	2
4	Ukraine	0	1	0	1
5	Czech Republic	0	0	1	1
5	France	0	0	1	1
5	Guatemala	0	0	1	1
5	Lithuania	0	0	1	1
5	Mexico	0	0	1	1
Totals (9 entries)		7	7	7	21

== Results ==
=== Men ===
Event	Gold		Silver		Bronze	
Individual	Csaba Bőhm; Hungary	1551	Balázs Szép; Hungary	1524	Jun Woong-tae; South Korea	1513
Team	Hungary; Csaba Bőhm; Bence Demeter; Balázs Szép	4544	South Korea; Jun Woong-tae; Kim Soeng-jin; Seo Chang-wan	4415	Czech Republic; Marek Grycz; Matěj Lukeš; Martin Vlach	3738
Relay	South Korea; Jun Woong-tae; Seo Chang-wan	1466	Ukraine; Maksym Aharushev; Oleksandr Tovkai	1442	France; Léo Bories; Ugo Fleurot	1427

=== Women ===
Event	Gold		Silver		Bronze	
Individual	Seong Seung-min; South Korea	1434	Blanka Guzi; Hungary	1433	Rita Erdős; Hungary	1418
Team	Hungary; Blanka Bauer; Rita Erdős; Blanka Guzi	4229	South Korea; Jang Ha-eun; Kim Sun-woo; Seong Seung-min	4182	Mexico; Mariana Arceo; Catherine Oliver; Tamara Vega	3766
Relay	South Korea; Kim Sun-woo; Seong Seung-min	1321	Egypt; Amira Kandil; Haydy Morsy	1282	Guatemala; Sofía Cabrera; Sophia Hernández	1271

=== Mixed ===
Event	Gold		Silver		Bronze	
Relay	South Korea; Seo Chang-wan; Kim Sun-woo	1116	Egypt; Mohamed El-Gendy; Malak Ismail	1110	Lithuania; Titas Puronas; Elzbieta Adomaitytė	1105

== Laser run ==
Event	Gold		Silver		Bronze	
Men's individual	Luo Shuai; China	09:57.91	Lorenzo Macías; Mexico	10:18.97	Liu Zhenfeng; China	10:21.53
Men's team	China; Luo Shuai; Liu Zhenfeng; Fan Daqian	30:43.78	France; Mohamed-Kamis Mtir; Florian Gerbe; Dany Boussada	32:46.60	Kuwait; Ahmed Al-Ameer; Naser Al-Azemi; Abdallah Meshref	46:36.40
Women's individual	Wu Xiyao; China	11:45.46	Ma Yujuan; China	11:56.47	Sun Wanting; China	12:02.67
Women's team	China; Wu Xiyao; Ma Yujuan; Sun Wanting	35:44.60	Philippines; Juliana Sevilla; Shyra Aranzado; Princess Arbilon	37:54.54	China; Wu Haoran; Zhang Ting; Zhang Jing	37:31.80
Mixed relay	China; Wu Xiyao; Liu Zhenfeng	12:36.20	Mexico; Lorenzo Macías; Mariana Arceo	12:37.07	Philippines; Shyra Aranzado; Samuel German	12:38.17
