= Aleix Heredia =

Spanish modern pentathlete (born 1992)

Personal information
- Full name: Aleix Heredia Vives
- Nationality: Spanish
- Born: 5 January 1992 (age 33); Barcelona, Spain

Sport
- Sport: Modern pentathlon

Aleix Heredia Vives (Note: In this Spanish name, the first or paternal surname is Heredia and the second or maternal family name is Vives.) (born 5 January 1992) is a Spanish modern pentathlete. He competed in the men's event at the 2020 Summer Olympics.
