= Marie Oteiza =

French modern pentathlete (born 1994)

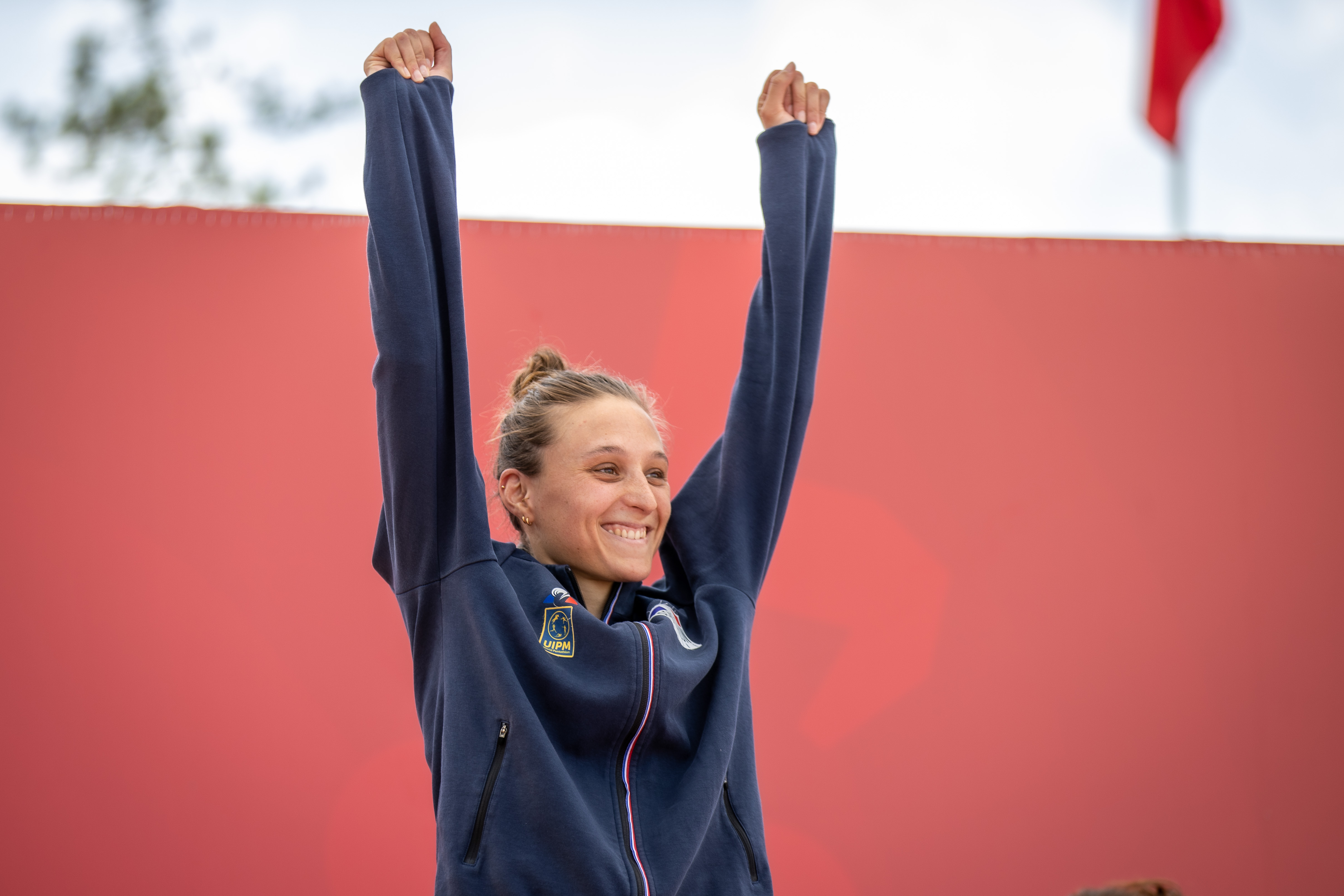

Personal information
- Nationality: French
- Born: 30 January 1994 (age 32) Mont-de-Marsan, France

Sport
- Country: France
- Sport: Modern pentathlon
Medal record
World Championships
Silver medal – second place	2018 Mexico City	Team
Bronze medal – third place	2018 Mexico City	Individual
European Championships
Gold medal – first place	2018 Székesfehérvár	Individual
Gold medal – first place	2018 Székesfehérvár	Mixed relay
Bronze medal – third place	2018 Székesfehérvár	Team
Bronze medal – third place	2022 Székesfehérvár	Mixed relay

Marie Oteiza (born 30 January 1994) is a French modern pentathlete.

She participated at the 2018 World Modern Pentathlon Championships, winning a medal.
