= Alexandre Dällenbach =

Swiss modern pentathlete (born 1991)

Personal information
- Born: 31 July 1991 (age 35)

Sport
- Country: Switzerland
- Sport: Modern pentathlon

Alexandre Dällenbach (born 31 July 1991) is a Swiss modern pentathlete. He competed at the 2024 Paris Olympics.

== Career ==
He used to compete in swimming and triathlon before focusing on modern pentathlon. He served a suspension for two years for doping in February 2012, following a positive finding for testosterone. His results retroactively removed from July 12, 2011.

He won gold in the mixed relay laser run alongside Katharina Jurt, and silver in the individual laser run, at the 2023 World Modern Pentathlon Championships in Bath, England.

He competed at the 2024 Summer Olympics in Paris. He qualified for the final with the best swimming time in his group.

== Personal life ==
Dällenbach was born on the island of Réunion.
