= Todor Mihalev =

Bulgarian modern pentathlete (born 1997)

Personal information
- Nationality: Bulgarian
- Born: 27 April 1997 (age 29) Aksakovo, Bulgaria

Sport
- Country: Bulgaria
- Sport: Modern pentathlon
Medal record
World Championships
Bronze medal – third place	2018 Mexico City	Relay

Todor Mihalev (Bulgarian: Тодор Михалев) (born 27 April 1997) is a Bulgarian modern pentathlete.

He participated at the 2018 World Modern Pentathlon Championships, winning a medal.
