= Pāvels Švecovs =

Latvian modern pentathlete (born 1994)

Personal information
- Nationality: Latvian
- Born: 4 September 1994 (age 30)

Sport
- Sport: Modern pentathlon

Pāvels Švecovs (born 4 September 1994) is a Latvian modern pentathlete. He competed in the men's event at the 2020 Summer Olympics.
