= Patrick Dogue =

German modern pentathlete (born 1992)

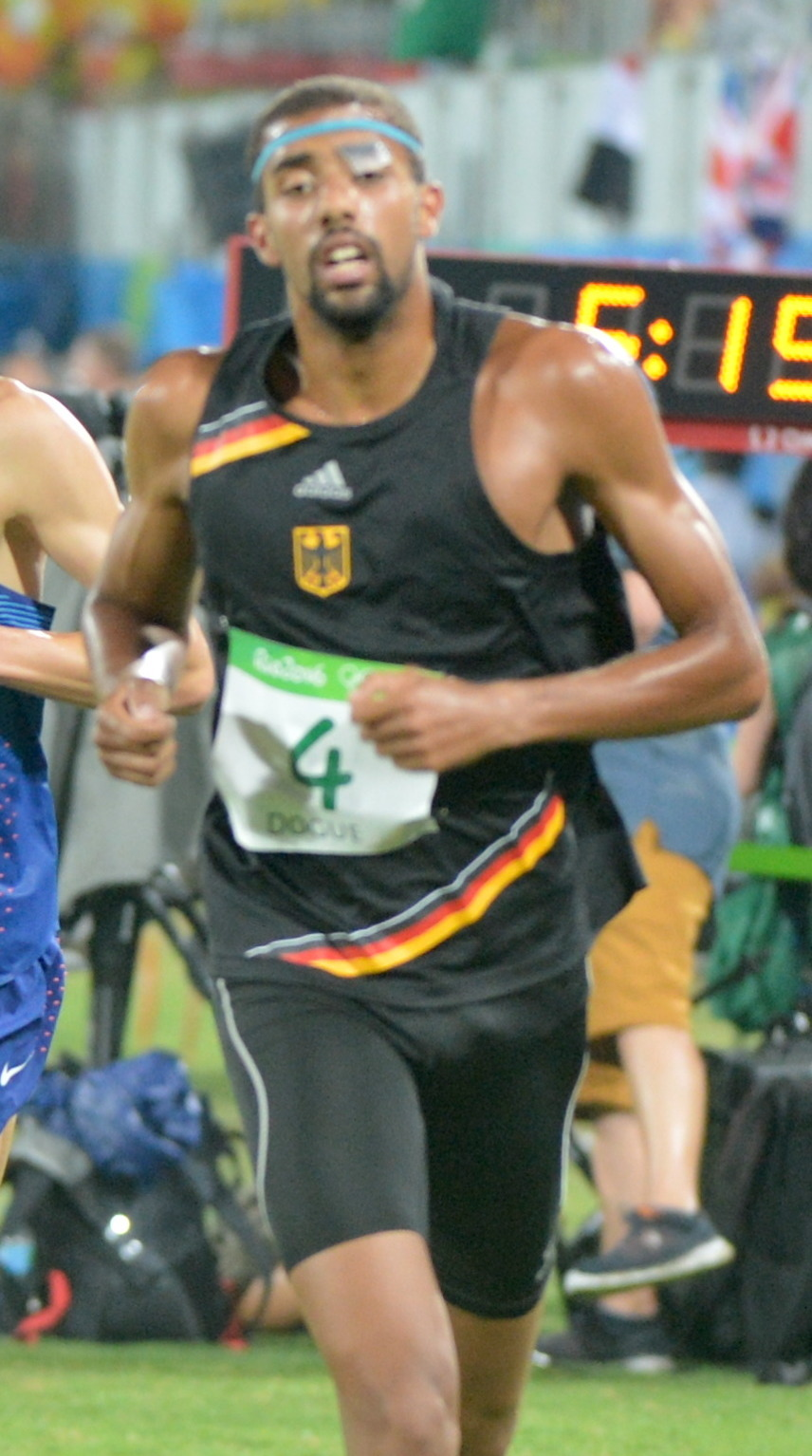
- Dogue at the 2016 Olympics

Personal information
- Born: 9 March 1992 (age 34) Ludwigshafen, Germany
- Height: 197 cm (6 ft 6 in)
- Weight: 81 kg (179 lb)

Sport
- Sport: Modern pentathlon
- Club: OSC Potsdam
- Coached by: Claudia Adermann (personal); Christian Sandow (national)
Medal record
World Championships
Gold medal – first place	2019 Budapest	Relay
Silver medal – second place	2021 Cairo	Team
Bronze medal – third place	2021 Cairo	Mixed relay
Bronze medal – third place	2022 Alexandria	Team
European Championships
Bronze medal – third place	2017 Minsk	Relay

Patrick Dogue (born 9 March 1992) is a German modern pentathlete who won the national title in 2013 and 2015. He qualified for the 2016 Summer Olympics by placing second at the 2016 World Cup; he finished sixth in the Olympics. His brother Marvin is also an international modern pentathlete.
