= Fabian Liebig =

German modern pentathlete

Personal information
- Nationality: German
- Born: 18 June 1994 (age 32)

Sport
- Country: Germany
- Sport: Modern pentathlon
Medal record
World Championships
Gold medal – first place	2018 Mexico City	Mixed
Silver medal – second place	2021 Cairo	Team
European Championships
Bronze medal – third place	2016 Sofia	Team

Fabian Liebig (born 18 June 1994) is a German modern pentathlete.

He participated at the 2018 World Modern Pentathlon Championships, winning a medal.
