= Martin Vlach (pentathlete) =

Czech modern pentathlete (born 1997)

Personal information
- Nationality: Czech
- Born: 2 May 1997 (age 29) Prague, Czech Republic

Sport
- Country: Czech Republic
- Sport: Modern pentathlon
Medal record
Men's modern pentathlon
Representing Czech Republic
World Championships
Silver medal – second place	2018 Mexico City	Relay
Bronze medal – third place	2024 Zhengzhou	Team
European Games
Gold medal – first place	2023 Kraków-Małopolska	Mixed relay
European Championships
Gold medal – first place	2022 Székesfehérvár	Relay
Gold medal – first place	2023 Kraków	Mixed relay
Bronze medal – third place	2019 Bath	Team
Bronze medal – third place	2022 Székesfehérvár	Team

Martin Vlach (born 2 May 1997) is a Czech modern pentathlete.

He participated at the 2018 World Modern Pentathlon Championships, winning a medal.
