= Łukasz Gutkowski =

Polish modern pentathlete

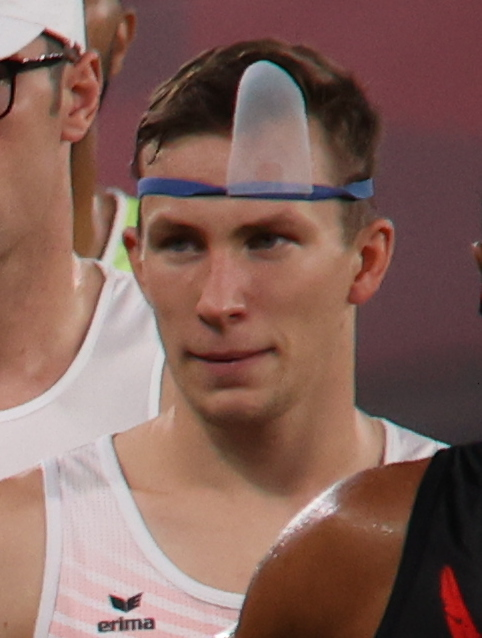
- Łukasz Gutkowski at the 2020 Summer Olympic Games

Personal information
- Nationality: Polish
- Born: 21 March 1998 (age 28) Warsaw, Poland

Sport
- Sport: Modern pentathlon
Medal record
Representing Poland
Men's modern pentathlon
European Championships
Silver medal – second place	2022 Székesfehérvár	Relay
Men's laser-run
World Championships
Gold medal – first place	2019 Budapest	Mixed relay
Gold medal – first place	2022 Lisbon	Individual
Gold medal – first place	2022 Lisbon	Mixed relay

Łukasz Gutkowski (born 21 March 1998) is a Polish modern pentathlete. He competed in the men's event at the 2020 Summer Olympics.

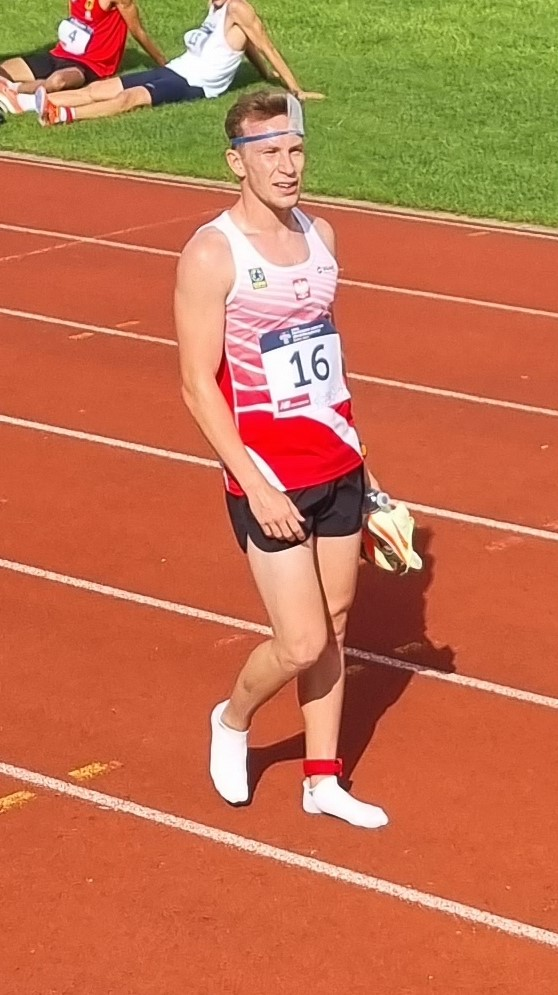
At the 2023 World Championships
