= Modern pentathlon at the 2024 Summer Olympics – Women's =

Women's modern pentathlon at the Games of the XXXIII Olympiad
- Venues: Palace of Versailles; Arena Paris Nord (fencing ranking rounds)
- Dates: 8–11 August 2024

Medalists
1st place, gold medalist(s)		Michelle Gulyás	Hungary
2nd place, silver medalist(s)		Élodie Clouvel	France
3rd place, bronze medalist(s)		Seong Seung-min	South Korea

The women's modern pentathlon at the 2024 Summer Olympics in Paris was held from 8 to 11 August 2024. Two venues were used: Palace of Versailles and Arena Paris Nord (fencing ranking rounds).

== Schedule ==
All times are Central European Summer Time (UTC+2)

== Results ==
=== Semifinal A ===
Rank	Athlete	Country	Swimming Time (pts)	Fencing RR+BR Victories (pts)	Riding Time (pts)	Laser run Time (pts)	Total
1	Kerenza Bryson	Great Britain	2:20.92 (269)	21+4 (234)	59.83 (300)	11:41.88 (599)	1402 Q, OR
2	Elena Micheli	Italy	2:10.63 (289)	19+4 (224)	59.19 (300)	11:52.10 (588)	1401 Q
3	Alice Sotero	Italy	2:10.24 (290)	12+8 (193)	59.84 (300)	11:22.83 (618)	1401 Q
4	Seong Seung-min	South Korea	2:12.44 (286)	20+0 (225)	58.59 (293)	11:44.13 (596)	1400 Q
5	Kate French	Great Britain	2:15.56 (279)	23+0 (240)	60.65 (293)	11:54.55 (586)	1398 Q
6	Lucie Hlaváčková	Czech Republic	2:19.46 (272)	16+2 (207)	62.24 (300)	11:24.77 (616)	1395 Q
7	Marie Oteiza	France	2:15.92 (279)	21+3 (232)	58.11 (300)	11:56.83 (584)	1395 Q
8	Malak Ismail	Egypt	2:15.70 (279)	17+6 (216)	59.20 (286)	11:30.82 (610)	1391 Q
9	Laura Asadauskaitė	Lithuania	2:23.71 (263)	16+0 (205)	65.61 (291)	11:10.90 (630)	1389 Q
10	Annika Zillekens	Germany	2:18.88 (273)	17+0 (210)	71.56 (275)	11:11.93 (629)	1387 q (Note: Annika Zillekens had originally missed the final by one spot but moved up because Kate French could not compete due to illness.)
11	Mayan Oliver	Mexico	2:26.21 (258)	18+0 (215)	57.30 (300)	11:27.41 (613)	1386
12	Marlena Jawaid	Sweden	2:20.65 (269)	18+0 (215)	66.82 (290)	12:09.81 (571)	1345
13	Genevieve van Rensburg	Australia	2:11.61 (287)	18+4 (219)	69.01 (273)	12:37.73 (543)	1322
14	Jessica Savner	United States	2:27.61 (255)	16+4 (209)	54.99 (293)	12:27.42 (553)	1310
15	Yelena Potapenko	Kazakhstan	2:16.67 (277)	15+0 (200)	53.88 (279)	12:35.18 (545)	1301
16	Isabela Abreu	Brazil	2:25.63 (259)	10+0 (175)	68.05 (288)	12:22.30 (558)	1280
17	Salma Abdelmaksoud	Egypt	2:13.55 (283)	16+0 (205)	EL	11:44.31 (596)	1084
18	Rebecca Langrehr	Germany	2:19.58 (271)	18+0 (215)	DNS	12:44.33 (536)	1022

=== Semifinal B ===
Rank	Athlete	Country	Swimming Time (pts)	Fencing RR+BR Victories (pts)	Riding Time (pts)	Laser run Time (pts)	Total
1	Élodie Clouvel	France	2:12.74 (285)	27+4 (264)	61.01 (300)	12:17.92 (563)	1398 Q
2	Laura Heredia	Spain	2:21.47 (268)	17+4 (214)	63.02 (300)	11:25.00 (615)	1397 Q
3	Michelle Gulyás	Hungary	2:10.39 (290)	24+2 (247)	58.66 (300)	12:06.06 (574)	1397 Q
4	Blanka Guzi	Hungary	2:16.93 (277)	15+0 (200)	58.61 (293)	11:20.80 (620)	1397 Q
5	Kim Sun-woo	South Korea	2:14.44 (282)	19+0 (220)	60.91 (293)	11:46.64 (594)	1396 Q
6	Gintarė Venčkauskaitė	Lithuania	2:19.15 (272)	16+0 (205)	59.65 (300)	11:25.30 (615)	1392 Q
7	İlke Özyüksel	Turkey	2:16.50 (277)	16+4 (209)	56.29 (300)	11:34.68 (606)	1392 Q
8	Zhang Mingyu	China	2:14.72 (281)	20+2 (227)	59.71 (300)	11:59.61 (581)	1389 Q
9	Anna Jurt	Switzerland	2:29.44 (252)	17+2 (212)	61.87 (286)	11:07.63 (633)	1383 Q
10	Valeriya Permykina	Ukraine	2:19.78 (271)	15+4 (204)	66.91 (297)	11:35.69 (605)	1377
11	Anna Maliszewska	Poland	2:18.56 (273)	16+0 (205)	59.27 (293)	11:38.96 (602)	1373
12	Misaki Uchida	Japan	2:08.56 (293)	15+0 (200)	58.25 (293)	12:10.13 (570)	1356
13	Natalia Dominiak	Poland	2:16.84 (277)	14+0 (195)	67.56 (286)	12:09.40 (571)	1329
14	Veronika Novotná	Czech Republic	2:20.97 (269)	22+2 (237)	57.70 (293)	13:03.98 (517)	1316
15	Alise Fakhrutdinova	Uzbekistan	2:21.30 (268)	19+2 (222)	58.48 (293)	12:58.08 (522)	1305
16	Sophia Hernández	Guatemala	2:22.83 (265)	15+2 (202)	58.23 (293)	12:45.04 (535)	1295
17	Sol Naranjo	Ecuador	2:38.78 (233)	13+0 (190)	56.68 (293)	12:24.75 (556)	1272
18	Mariana Arceo	Mexico	2:15.78 (279)	12+8 (193)	EL	11:38.41 (602)	1074

=== Final ===
Rank	Athlete	Country	Swimming Time (pts)	Fencing RR+BR Victories (pts)	Riding Time (pts)	Laser run Time (pts)	Total
1st place, gold medalist(s)	Michelle Gulyás	Hungary	2:12.44 (286)	24+0 (245)	62.69 (300)	11:10.01 (630)	1461 WR
2nd place, silver medalist(s)	Élodie Clouvel	France	2:11.64 (287)	27+4 (260)	60.71 (293)	11:32.35 (608)	1452
3rd place, bronze medalist(s)	Seong Seung-min	South Korea	2:11.47 (288)	20+0 (225)	62.01 (300)	11:12.87 (628)	1441
4	Blanka Guzi	Hungary	2:16.25 (278)	15+0 (200)	56.52 (300)	10:45.48 (655)	1433
5	Elena Micheli	Italy	2:12.47 (286)	19+12 (220)	56.82 (293)	11:27.86 (616)	1424
6	İlke Özyüksel	Turkey	2:15.48 (280)	16+0 (205)	58.94 (293)	10:58.20 (642)	1420
7	Gintarė Venčkauskaitė	Lithuania	2:18.16 (274)	16+0 (205)	58.98 (300)	11:00.31 (640)	1419
8	Kim Sun-woo	South Korea	2:17.67 (275)	19+2 (220)	59.12 (286)	11:13.92 (627)	1410
9	Kerenza Bryson	Great Britain	2:21.77 (267)	21+0 (230)	62.27 (286)	11:19.12 (621)	1404
10	Lucie Hlaváčková	Czech Republic	2:20.54 (269)	16+4 (205)	59.85 (293)	11:08.44 (632)	1403
11	Anna Jurt	Switzerland	2:28.96 (253)	17+0 (210)	60.72 (300)	11:00.82 (640)	1403
12	Malak Ismail	Egypt	2:16.94 (277)	17+2 (210)	60.07 (293)	11:27.35 (613)	1395
13	Alice Sotero	Italy	2:09.93 (291)	12+6 (185)	57.61 (300)	11:33.81 (607)	1389
14	Zhang Mingyu	China	2:17.66 (275)	20+0 (225)	60.93 (300)	11:54.40 (586)	1386
15	Annika Zillekens	Germany	2:20.71 (269)	17+2 (210)	56.69 (300)	11:45.71 (595)	1376
16	Laura Asadauskaitė	Lithuania	2:24.52 (261)	16+2 (205)	57.86 (293)	11:32.07 (608)	1369
17	Laura Heredia	Spain	2:24.14 (262)	17+2 (210)	EL	10:50.73 (650)	1124
18	Marie Oteiza	France	2:16.84 (277)	21+0 (230)	EL	12:10.05 (570)	1077
