= Poland at the 2024 Summer Olympics =

- IOC code: POL
- NOC: Polish Olympic Committee
- Website: olimpijski.pl (in Polish)

in Paris, France 26 July 2024 – 11 August 2024
- Competitors: 218 (99 men and 119 women) in 23 sports
- Flag bearers (opening): Przemysław Zamojski & Anita Włodarczyk
- Flag bearers (closing): Julia Szeremeta & Wiktor Głazunow
- Officials: Tomasz Majewski (chef de mission)
- Medals Ranked 42nd: Gold 1 Silver 4 Bronze 5 Total 10

Summer Olympics appearances (overview)
- 1924; 1928; 1932; 1936; 1948; 1952; 1956; 1960; 1964; 1968; 1972; 1976; 1980; 1984; 1988; 1992; 1996; 2000; 2004; 2008; 2012; 2016; 2020; 2024; 2028

Other related appearances
- Russian Empire (1900, 1912); Austria (1908–1912)

Poland competed at the 2024 Summer Olympics in Paris from 26 July to 11 August 2024, celebrating the centenary of the team's debut in the same venue. Polish athletes have appeared in every edition of the Summer Olympic Games from 1924 onwards, except for the 1984 Summer Olympics because of the Soviet boycott.

The Polish national representation won a total of 10 medals (1 gold, 4 silver, 5 bronze) in 9 different sports and was ranked 42nd in the medal table, the lowest place in the country's history of participation in the Summer Olympics. 8 medals were won by female athletes while 2 medals were won by male athletes. The number of both gold was Poland's lowest since 1956, and total medals was lowest since 2004.

Notable achievements of Polish athletes include tennis player Iga Świątek's bronze medal in the women's singles event, which made her the first Pole in history to win an Olympic medal in tennis. Julia Szeremeta, who won the silver medal in boxing, became the first Polish female boxer to claim an Olympic medal in this sport. Aleksandra Mirosław set a new world record of 6.06 seconds in speed climbing and subsequently won the historic first Olympic gold medal in this event. The silver medal won by the Poland men's national volleyball team marked the first time in 48 years since the team's last Olympic medal in Montreal 1976 when Poland won gold. Weronika Lizakowska set a new national record of 3:57.31 in the 1,500 meter event, which previously belonged to Lidia Chojecka. Another new national record was set by Alicja Konieczek in the 3000 metres steeplechase who achieved 9:16.51 and improved the record previously held by Wioletta Frankiewicz.

On the 100th anniversary of the official participation of Polish athletes at the Olympic Games, the Polish Olympic Committee inaugurated the first ever Polish House (Maison Polonaise), which was located in the Bois de Boulogne in Paris. The opening ceremony was attended by President of Poland Andrzej Duda. The house served as a meeting place for Polish Olympians, journalists and supporters and hosted events promoting Poland and Polish sport.

Double Olympic Champion, Tomasz Majewski, was appointed as the nation's chef de mission for the Paris Olympic Games.

== Medalists ==
Medal	Name	Sport	Event	Date
Gold	Aleksandra Mirosław	Sport climbing	Women's speed	7 August
Silver	Klaudia Zwolińska	Canoeing	Women's slalom K-1	28 July
Silver	Poland men's national volleyball team: Mateusz Bieniek; Bartłomiej Bołądź; Tomasz Fornal; Norbert Huber; Marcin Janusz; Łukasz Kaczmarek; Bartosz Kurek; Jakub Kochanowski; Wilfredo León; Grzegorz Łomacz; Kamil Semeniuk; Aleksander Śliwka; Paweł Zatorski	Volleyball	Men's tournament	10 August
Silver	Julia Szeremeta	Boxing	Women's 57 kg	10 August
Silver	Daria Pikulik	Cycling	Women's omnium	11 August
Bronze	Aleksandra Jarecka; Alicja Klasik; Renata Knapik-Miazga; Martyna Swatowska-Wenglarczyk	Fencing	Women's team épée	30 July
Bronze	Fabian Barański; Mateusz Biskup; Dominik Czaja; Mirosław Ziętarski	Rowing	Men's quadruple sculls	31 July
Bronze	Iga Świątek	Tennis	Women's singles	2 August
Bronze	Aleksandra Kałucka	Sport climbing	Women's speed	7 August
Bronze	Natalia Kaczmarek	Athletics	Women's 400 m	9 August

Medals by sport
Sport	1st place, gold medalist(s)	2nd place, silver medalist(s)	3rd place, bronze medalist(s)	Total
Athletics	0	0	1	1
Boxing	0	1	0	1
Canoeing	0	1	0	1
Cycling	0	1	0	1
Fencing	0	0	1	1
Rowing	0	0	1	1
Sport climbing	1	0	1	2
Tennis	0	0	1	1
Volleyball	0	1	0	1
Total	1	4	5	10

Medals by gender
Gender	1st place, gold medalist(s)	2nd place, silver medalist(s)	3rd place, bronze medalist(s)	Total
Male	0	1	1	2
Female	1	3	4	8
Mixed	0	0	0	0
Total	1	4	5	10

Medals by date
Date	1st place, gold medalist(s)	2nd place, silver medalist(s)	3rd place, bronze medalist(s)	Total
28 July	0	1	0	1
30 July	0	0	1	1
31 July	0	0	1	1
2 August	0	0	1	1
7 August	1	0	1	2
9 August	0	0	1	1
10 August	0	2	0	2
11 August	0	1	0	1
Total	1	4	5	10

== Competitors ==
The following is the list of number of competitors in the Games.

Sport	Men	Women	Total
Archery	0	1	1
Athletics	26	33	59
Basketball	4	0	4
Boxing	2	3	5
Canoeing	5	10	15
Cycling	5	9	14
Diving	1	0	1
Equestrian	5	5	10
Fencing	4	8	12
Golf	1	0	1
Judo	2	2	4
Modern pentathlon	2	2	4
Rowing	4	2	6
Sailing	5	5	10
Shooting	2	5	7
Sport climbing	0	2	2
Swimming	13	8	21
Table tennis	1	4	5
Tennis	0	4	4
Triathlon	0	1	1
Volleyball	14	12	26
Weightlifting	0	1	1
Wrestling	3	2	5
Total	99	119	218

== Archery ==
One Polish archer qualified for the 2024 Summer Olympics women's individual recurve competitions by virtue of her result at the 2024 Final Qualification Tournament in Antalya, Turkey.

Athlete	Event	Ranking round		Round of 64	Round of 32	Round of 16	Quarterfinals	Semifinals	Final / BM	
Athlete	Event	Score	Seed	Opposition Score	Opposition Score	Opposition Score	Opposition Score	Opposition Score	Opposition Score	Rank
Wioleta Myszor	Women's individual	626	54	Bhakat (IND); W 6–4	Kaur (IND); L 0–6	Did not advance				

== Athletics ==
Polish track and field athletes achieved the entry standards for Paris 2024, either by passing the direct qualifying mark (or time for track and road races) or by world ranking, in the following events (a maximum of 3 athletes each):

Key

- Note–Ranks given for track events are within the athlete's heat only
- Q = Qualified for the next round
- q = Qualified for the next round as a fastest loser or, in field events, by position without achieving the qualifying target
- NR = National record
- N/A = Round not applicable for the event
- Bye = Athlete not required to compete in round

Track and road events
Men

Athlete	Event	Heat		Repechage		Semifinal		Final	
Athlete	Event	Result	Rank	Result	Rank	Result	Rank	Result	Rank
Oliwer Wdowik	100 m	11.53	9	—N/a		Did not advance			
Albert Komański	200 m	20.77	8 R	20.90	5	Did not advance			
Mateusz Borkowski	800 m	1:47.50	7 R	1:45.27	6	Did not advance			
Filip Rak	1500 m	3:38.12	11 R	3:34.53	7	Did not advance			
Maciej Wyderka	1500 m	3:38.79	12 R	3:36.79	9	Did not advance			
Damian Czykier	110 m hurdles	13.99	8 R	13.71	5	Did not advance			
Krzysztof Kiljan	110 m hurdles	13.67	8 R	13.73	6	Did not advance			
Jakub Szymański	110 m hurdles	13.75	7 R	13.63	4	Did not advance			
Maher Ben Hlima	20 km walk	—N/a						1:22:34	29
Artur Brzozowski	20 km walk	—N/a						1:22:11	27
Kajetan Duszyński; Daniel Sołtysiak; Maksymilian Szwed; Karol Zalewski	4 × 400 m relay	3:01.21	7	—N/a				Did not advance	

Women

Athlete	Event	Heat		Repechage		Semifinal		Final	
Athlete	Event	Result	Rank	Result	Rank	Result	Rank	Result	Rank
Magdalena Stefanowicz	100 m	11.47	7	—N/a		Did not advance			
Ewa Swoboda	100 m	10.99	1 Q	—N/a		11.08	4	Did not advance	
Martyna Kotwiła	200 m	23.43	6 R	23.50	4	Did not advance			
Krystsina Tsimanouskaya	200 m	23.30	5 R	23.01	2	Did not advance			
Natalia Kaczmarek	400 m	49.98	1 Q	Bye		49.45	1 Q	48.98	3rd place, bronze medalist(s)
Justyna Święty-Ersetic	400 m	50.95	4 R	50.89	2	Did not advance			
Anna Wielgosz	800 m	2:02.54	8 R	2:05.77	7	Did not advance			
Klaudia Kazimierska	1500 m	4:03.49	4 Q	Bye		4:00.21 PB	5 Q	4:00.12 PB	10
Weronika Lizakowska	1500 m	4:01.54 PB	5 Q	Bye		3:57.31 NR	7	Did not advance	
Aleksandra Płocińska	1500 m	4:10.12	14 R	4:09.47	9	Did not advance			
Pia Skrzyszowska	100 m hurdles	12.82	3 Q	Bye		12.55	=3	Did not advance	
Alicja Konieczek	3000 m steeplechase	9:16.51 NR	4 Q	—N/a				9:21.31	13
Aneta Konieczek	3000 m steeplechase	9:24.43 PB	9	—N/a				Did not advance	
Kinga Królik	3000 m steeplechase	9:26.61 PB	8	—N/a				Did not advance	
Magdalena Niemczyk; Magdalena Stefanowicz; Ewa Swoboda; Krystsina Tsimanouskaya	4 × 100 m relay	42.86	5	—N/a				Did not advance	
Aleksandra Formella; Anastazja Kuś; Justyna Święty-Ersetic; Alicja Wrona-Kutrzepa	4 × 400 m relay	3:26.69	6	—N/a				Did not advance	
Aleksandra Lisowska	Marathon	—N/a						2:31:10	36
Angelika Mach	Marathon	—N/a						2:37:56	64
Katarzyna Zdziebło	20 km walk	—N/a						1:33:52	30

Mixed

Athlete	Event	Heat		Final	
Athlete	Event	Result	Rank	Result	Rank
Maksymilian Szwed; Karol Zalewski; Marika Popowicz-Drapała; Justyna Święty-Ersetic; Alicja Wrona-Kutrzepa	Mixed 4 × 400 m relay	3:11.43	5 q	3:12.39	7
Maher Ben Hlima; Olga Chojecka	Marathon race walking mixed relay	—N/a		3:00:55	16

Field events
Men

Athlete	Event	Qualification		Final	
Athlete	Event	Result	Rank	Result	Rank
Piotr Lisek	Pole vault	5.60	15	Did not advance	
Robert Sobera	Pole vault	5.60	15	Did not advance	
Konrad Bukowiecki	Shot put	18.83	28	Did not advance	
Michał Haratyk	Shot put	19.94	19	Did not advance	
Paweł Fajdek	Hammer throw	76.56	9 q	78.80	5
Wojciech Nowicki	Hammer throw	76.32	10 q	77.42	7
Marcin Krukowski	Javelin throw	82.34	14	Did not advance	
Cyprian Mrzygłód	Javelin throw	78.50	23	Did not advance	
Dawid Wegner	Javelin throw	76.89	26	Did not advance	

Women

Athlete	Event	Qualification		Final	
Athlete	Event	Result	Rank	Result	Rank
Maria Żodzik	High jump	1.83	28	Did not advance	
Nikola Horowska	Long jump	6.31	27	Did not advance	
Klaudia Kardasz	Shot put	17.45	19	Did not advance	
Daria Zabawska	Discus throw	60.86	20	Did not advance	
Malwina Kopron	Hammer throw	67.68	23	Did not advance	
Anita Włodarczyk	Hammer throw	71.06	12 q	74.23	4
Maria Andrejczyk	Javelin throw	65.52	1 Q	62.44	8

Combined events – Women's heptathlon

Athlete	Event	100H	HJ	SP	200 m	LJ	JT	800 m	Final	Rank
Adrianna Sułek	Result	13.32	1.77	13.94	24.20	6.22	36.63	2:12.06	6226	12
Adrianna Sułek	Points	1077	941	790	962	918	603	935	6226	12

== Basketball ==
=== 3×3 basketball ===
Summary

Team	Event	Group stage								Quarterfinal	Semifinal	Final / BM	
Team	Event	Opposition Score	Opposition Score	Opposition Score	Opposition Score	Opposition Score	Opposition Score	Opposition Score	Rank	Opposition Score	Opposition Score	Opposition Score	Rank
Poland men's	Men's tournament	China; W 22–17	France; L 19–21	Latvia; L 16–22	Lithuania; L 12–21	Netherlands; L 17–21	Serbia; L 12–21	United States; W 19–17	6 Q	Lithuania; L 15–21	Did not advance		6

==== Men's tournament ====
The Poland men's 3x3 team qualified for the Olympics by virtue of top three finish through the 2024 FIBA Olympic Qualifying Tournament in Debrecen, Hungary.

Team roster

The roster was announced on 6 July 2024.

- Adrian Bogucki
- Filip Matczak
- Michał Sokołowski
- Przemysław Zamojski

Group play

Pos	Team	Pld	W	L	PF	PA	PD	Qualification
1	Latvia	7	7	0	147	103	+44	Semifinals
2	Netherlands	7	5	2	133	112	+21	Semifinals
3	Lithuania	7	4 (Note: Lithuania 20–18 Serbia)	3	134	125	+9	Play-ins
4	Serbia	7	4	3	129	123	+6	Play-ins
5	France (H)	7	3	4	131	132	−1	Play-ins
6	Poland	7	2 (Note: United States 17–19 Poland)	5	116	139	−23	Play-ins
7	United States	7	2	5	116	138	−22	
8	China	7	1	6	107	141	−34	

Source: FIBA
Rules for classification: 1) Wins; 2) Head-to-head record; 3) Points scored.
(H) Hosts
Notes:

30 July 2024
22:05
v

Boxscore

Poland	19–21	France
Pts: Bogucki, Zamojski 6		Pts: Dussoulier 9

Place de la Concorde, Paris
Referees: Brigitta Csabai-Kaskötő (HUN), Vlad Ghizdareanu (ROU)

31 July 2024
22:35
v

Boxscore

United States	17–19	Poland
Pts: Barry, Travis 6		Pts: Bogucki 7

Place de la Concorde, Paris
Referees: Jasmina Juras (SRB), Vlad Ghizdareanu (ROU)

1 August 2024
13:25
v

Boxscore

Lithuania	21–12	Poland
Pts: Džiaugys 10		Pts: Bogucki 6

Place de la Concorde, Paris
Referees: Markos Michaelides (SUI), Deanna Jackson (USA)

1 August 2024
19:35
v

Boxscore

China	17–22	Poland
Pts: Zhang 9		Pts: Zamojski 9

Place de la Concorde, Paris
Referees: Najib Chajiddine (FRA), Vlad Ghizdareanu (ROU)

2 August 2024
10:35
v

Boxscore

Poland	17–21	Netherlands
Pts: Zamojski 8		Pts: three players 6

Place de la Concorde, Paris
Referees: Deanna Jackson (USA), Jasmina Juras (SRB)

2 August 2024
22:05
v

Boxscore

Serbia	21–12	Poland
Pts: Majstorović 7		Pts: Bogucki 6

Place de la Concorde, Paris
Referees: Edmond Ho (HKG), Najib Chajiddine (FRA)

4 August 2024
18:00
v

Boxscore

Poland	16–22	Latvia
Pts: Sokołowski 6		Pts: Miezis 13

Place de la Concorde, Paris
Referees: Brigitta Csabai-Kaskötő (HUN), Edmond Ho (HKG)

Play-in

4 August 2024
21:30
v

Boxscore

Lithuania	21–15	Poland
Pts: Džiaugys, Vingelis 9		Pts: Sokołowski 7

Place de la Concorde, Paris
Referees: Jasmina Juras (SRB), Najib Chajiddine (FRA)

== Boxing ==
Poland entered one male and three female boxers into the Olympic tournament. Julia Szeremeta (women's featherweight), Aneta Rygielska (women's welterweight) and Elżbieta Wójcik (women's middleweight), qualified themself to Paris 2024, by winning the quota bouts round, in their respective division, at the 2024 World Olympic Qualification Tournament 1 in Busto Arsizio, Italy. At the 2024 World Boxing Olympic Qualification Tournament 2 in Bangkok, Thailand, the qualification was obtained by Damian Durkacz (men's welterweight) and Mateusz Bereźnicki (men's heavyweight).

Athlete	Event	Round of 32	Round of 16	Quarterfinals	Semifinals	Final	
Athlete	Event	Opposition Result	Opposition Result	Opposition Result	Opposition Result	Opposition Result	Rank
Damian Durkacz	Men's 71 kg	Kiwan (BUL); L 0–5	Did not advance				
Mateusz Bereźnicki	Men's 92 kg	—N/a	Marley (IRL); L 1–4	Did not advance			
Julia Szeremeta	Women's 57 kg	Alcalá (VEN); W 4–1	Rahimi (AUS); W 5–0	Lozada (PUR); W 5–0	Petecio (PHI); W 4–1	Lin (TPE); L 0–5	2nd place, silver medalist(s)
Aneta Rygielska	Women's 66 kg	Eccles (GBR); W 3–2	Sürmeneli (TUR); L 1–4	Did not advance			
Elżbieta Wójcik	Women's 75 kg	—N/a	O'Rourke (IRL); W 3–2	Bylon (PAN); L 2–3	Did not advance		

== Canoeing ==
=== Slalom ===
Polish canoeists qualified three boats during 2023 ICF Canoe Slalom World Championships in London, United Kingdom; and one boat through the re-allocation of unused Oceania continental spot.

Athlete	Event	Preliminary						Semifinal		Final	
Athlete	Event	Run 1	Rank	Run 2	Rank	Best	Rank	Time	Rank	Time	Rank
Mateusz Polaczyk	Men's K-1	87.89	10	139.58	23	87.89	13 Q	98.49	13	Did not advance	
Grzegorz Hedwig	Men's C-1	94.08	7	100.30	13	94.08	8 Q	104.24	12	105.81	10
Klaudia Zwolińska	Women's K-1	96.33	5	93.03	2	93.03	2 Q	99.84	2 Q	97.53	2nd place, silver medalist(s)
Klaudia Zwolińska	Women's C-1	106.84	6	107.89	9	106.84	10 Q	123.64	17	Did not advance	

Kayak cross

Athlete	Event	Time Trials		Round 1	Repachage	Heats	Quarterfinals	Semifinals	Final	
Athlete	Event	Time	Rank	Position	Position	Position	Position	Position	Position	Rank
Grzegorz Hedwig	Men's	81.42	35	4 R	1 Q	2 Q	4	Did not advance		16
Mateusz Polaczyk	Men's	68.11	9	2 Q	Bye	2 Q	2 Q	4 FB	4	8
Klaudia Zwolińska	Women's	75.19	18	3 R	1 Q	3	Did not advance			22

=== Sprint ===
Polish canoeists qualified one boats in each of the following distances for the Games through the 2023 ICF Canoe Sprint World Championships in Duisburg, Germany; and 2024 European Qualifier in Szeged, Hungary. Poland entered additionally three boats in women's C-1 200 metres, K-1 500 metres and K-2 500 metres for the canoeists already admitted in the other events.

Athlete	Event	Heats		Quarterfinals		Semifinals		Final	
Athlete	Event	Time	Rank	Time	Rank	Time	Rank	Time	Rank
Wiktor Głazunow	Men's C-1 1000 m	3:48.40	1 SF	Bye		3:45.30	3 FA	3:49.05	6
Przemysław Korsak; Jakub Stepun	Men's K-2 500 m	1:28.84	1 SF	Bye		1:30.95	8 FB	1:32.05	13
Dorota Borowska	Women's C-1 200 m	47.92	1 SF	Bye		46.52	6 FB	46.36	10
Katarzyna Szperkiewicz	Women's C-1 200 m	47.49	4 QF	47.74	3	Did not advance			
Dorota Borowska; Sylwia Szczerbińska	Women's C-2 500 m	1:58.42	3 QF	1:55.39	1 SF	1:57.19	4 FA	1:55.75	5
Dominika Putto	Women's K-1 500 m	1:52.49	3 QF	1:51.82	1 SF	1:51.43	5 FC	1:52.85	18
Martyna Klatt; Helena Wiśniewska	Women's K-2 500 m	1:40.95	1 SF	Bye		1:40.73	6 FB	1:43.82	11
Karolina Naja; Anna Puławska	Women's K-2 500 m	1:39.18	2 SF	Bye		1:42.14	7 FB	1:44.50	12
Adrianna Kąkol; Karolina Naja; Anna Puławska; Dominika Putto	Women's K-4 500 m	1:33.87	3 FA	—N/a		Bye		1:33.17	4

Qualification Legend: FA = Qualify to final (medal); FB = Qualify to final B (non-medal)

== Cycling ==
=== Road ===
Poland entered four road cyclist (one male and three female) into the games. Poland secured those quota through the UCI Nation Ranking and 2023 World Championships in Glasgow, Great Britain.

Athlete	Event	Time	Rank
Stanisław Aniołkowski	Men's road race	6:38:03	61
Michał Kwiatkowski	Men's time trial	38:49.60	23
Marta Lach	Women's road race	4:02:50	10
Katarzyna Niewiadoma	Women's road race	4:02:07	8
Agnieszka Skalniak-Sójka	Women's road race	4:07:16	45
Marta Lach	Women's time trial	43:03.43	18
Agnieszka Skalniak-Sójka	Women's time trial	42:24.62	12

=== Track ===
Poland entered a squads in the following track events, based on their performances at the final UCI Olympic rankings.

Sprint

Athlete	Event	Qualification		Round 1	Repechage 1	Round 2	Repechage 2	Round 3	Repechage 3	Quarterfinals	Semifinals	Finals / BM	
Athlete	Event	Time Speed (km/h)	Rank	Opposition Time Speed (km/h)	Opposition Time Speed (km/h)	Opposition Time Speed (km/h)	Opposition Time Speed (km/h)	Opposition Time Speed (km/h)	Opposition Time Speed (km/h)	Opposition Time Speed (km/h)	Opposition Time Speed (km/h)	Opposition Time Speed (km/h)	Rank
Mateusz Rudyk	Men's sprint	9.416; 76.466	11 Q	Dakin (NZL); W 9.906; 72.683	Bye	Hoogland (NED); L 10.074; 71.471	Tjon En Fa (SUR); W 9.868; 72.963	Richardson (AUS); L 9.892; 72.786	Yakovlev (ISR); Awang (MAS); W 9.966; 72.246	Lavreysen (NED); L L	Did not advance	5th place final Obara (JPN); Turnbull (GBR); Ota (JPN); W	5
Marlena Karwacka	Women's sprint	10.758; 66.927	23 Q	Finucane (GBR); L 11.804; 60.996	Kouamé (FRA); Cuadrado (COL); L	Did not advance							
Nikola Sibiak	Women's sprint	10.945; 65.783	25	Did not advance									

Team sprint

Athlete	Event	Qualification		Round 1		Final	
Athlete	Event	Time Speed (km/h)	Rank	Opposition Time Speed (km/h)	Rank	Opposition Time Speed (km/h)	Rank
Marlena Karwacka; Urszula Łoś; Nikola Sibiak	Women's team sprint	47.284; 57.102	7	New Zealand; L 47.022; 57.420	8	Canada; W 47.175; 57.234	7

Qualification legend: FA=Gold medal final; FB=Bronze medal final

Keirin

Athlete	Event	Round 1	Repechage	Quarterfinals	Semifinals	Final
Athlete	Event	Rank	Rank	Rank	Rank	Rank
Mateusz Rudyk	Men's keirin	2 Q	Bye	3 Q	6 FB	10
Marlena Karwacka	Women's keirin	3 R	3	Did not advance		
Urszula Łoś	Women's keirin	5 R	5	Did not advance		

Omnium

Athlete	Event	Scratch race		Tempo race		Elimination race		Points race		Total	
Athlete	Event	Rank	Points	Rank	Points	Rank	Points	Rank	Points	Rank	Points
Alan Banaszek	Men's omnium	19	4	17	8	9	24	11	5	18	41
Daria Pikulik	Women's omnium	14	14	3	36	10	22	1	59	2nd place, silver medalist(s)	131

Madison

Athlete	Event	Points	Laps	Rank
Daria Pikulik; Wiktoria Pikulik	Women's madison	14	0	7

=== Mountain biking ===
Polish mountain bikers qualified for one men's and one women's quota place into the Olympic cross-country race, as a result of the nation's seventeenth-place finish for men and fifteenth for women, respectively, through the release of the final UCI Olympic Ranking List.

Athlete	Event	Time	Rank
Krzysztof Łukasik	Men's cross-country	1:33:55	27
Paula Gorycka	Women's cross-country	LAP (2 laps)	27

== Diving ==
Poland entered one divers into Paris 2024. The nation's gained the quotas by virtue of the top twelve individual in men's platform, not yet qualified, at the 2024 World Aquatics Championships in Doha, Qatar.

Athlete	Event	Preliminary		Semifinal		Final	
Athlete	Event	Points	Rank	Points	Rank	Points	Rank
Robert Łukaszewicz	Men's 10 m platform	336.05	18 Q	396.45	14	Did not advance	

== Equestrian ==
Poland fielded a squad of three equestrian riders into the team dressage and eventing competitions by securing a lone outright berth each at the International Equestrian Federation (FEI)-designated Olympic dressage qualifier for Group C (Central and Eastern Europe) in Pilisjászfalu, Hungary, and at the Olympic eventing qualifier for the same region in Baborówko, respectively.

=== Dressage ===
Athlete	Horse	Event	Grand Prix		Grand Prix Special		Grand Prix Freestyle		Overall	
Athlete	Horse	Event	Score	Rank	Score	Rank	Technical	Artistic	Score	Rank
Katarzyna Milczarek	Guapo	Individual	66.910	9	—N/a		Did not advance		66.910	48
Aleksandra Szulc	Breakdance	Individual	60.078	10	—N/a		Did not advance		60.078	58
Sandra Sysojeva	Maxima Bella	Individual	73.416	4 q	—N/a		73.893	86.257	80.075	15
Katarzyna Milczarek; Aleksandra Szulc; Sandra Sysojeva	See above	Team	200.404	14	Did not advance		—N/a		200.404	14

Qualification Legend: Q = Qualified for the final based on position in group; q = Qualified for the final based on overall position

=== Eventing ===
Athlete	Horse	Event	Dressage		Cross-country			Jumping						Total	
Athlete	Horse	Event	Dressage		Cross-country			Qualifier			Final			Total	
Athlete	Horse	Event	Penalties	Rank	Penalties	Total	Rank	Penalties	Total	Rank	Penalties	Total	Rank	Penalties	Rank
Jan Kamiński	Jard	Individual	35.80	46	200.00	Eliminated		20.00	Did not advance						
Małgorzata Korycka	Canvalencia	Individual	39.40	57	21.20	60.60	44	10.00	70.60	39	Did not advance			70.60	39
Robert Powała	Tosca del Castegno	Individual	34.70	39	60.00	94.70	54	1.60	96.30	48	Did not advance			96.30	48
Wiktoria Knap	Quintus 134	—N/a						22.80	—N/a						
Jan Kamiński; Wiktoria Knap; Małgorzata Korycka; Robert Powała	See above	Team	109.90	15	281.20	391.10	16	54.40	445.40	16	—N/a			445.40	16

=== Jumping ===
Athlete	Horse	Event	Qualification		Final		
Athlete	Horse	Event	Penalties	Rank	Penalties	Time	Rank
Adam Grzegorzewski	ISSEM	Individual	8	52	Did not advance		
Dawid Kubiak	Flash Blue B	Individual	8	53	Did not advance		
Maksymilian Wechta	Chepettano	Individual	12	58	Did not advance		
Adam Grzegorzewski; Dawid Kubiak; Maksymilian Wechta	See above	Team	234.45	17	Did not advance		

== Fencing ==
Poland entered nine fencers into the Olympic competition. The nations men's and women's foil team qualified for the games by becoming the highest ranked European team; meanwhile women's épée team qualified by becoming one of four highest ranked team worldwide through the FIE Official ranking.

Athlete	Event	Round of 64	Round of 32	Round of 16	Quarterfinal	Semifinal	Final / BM	
Athlete	Event	Opposition Score	Opposition Score	Opposition Score	Opposition Score	Opposition Score	Opposition Score	Rank
Jan Jurkiewicz	Men's foil	Heroui (ALG); W 15–8	Hamza (EGY); L 14–15	Did not advance				29
Michał Siess	Men's foil	Bye	Choupenitch (CZE); L 3–15	Did not advance				25
Adrian Wojtkowiak	Men's foil	Tofalides (CYP); L 10–15	Did not advance					34
Jan Jurkiewicz; Andrzej Rządkowski*; Michał Siess; Adrian Wojtkowiak	Men's team foil	—N/a			Italy; L 39–45	Classification semifinal Egypt; W 45–36	Fifth place final China; L 30–45	6
Alicja Klasik	Women's épée	Bye	Rizzi (ITA); W 12–11	Differt (EST); L 10–11	Did not advance			15
Renata Knapik-Miazga	Women's épée	Bye	Vitalis (FRA); L 9–15	Did not advance				25
Martyna Swatowska-Wenglarczyk	Women's épée	Bye	Song (KOR); L 11–15	Did not advance				28
Aleksandra Jarecka*; Alicja Klasik; Renata Knapik-Miazga; Martyna Swatowska-Wenglarczyk	Women's team épée	—N/a			United States; W 31–29	France; L 39–45	China; W 32–31	3rd place, bronze medalist(s)
Martyna Jelińska	Women's foil	Zekrani (MAR); W 15–3	Kiefer (USA); L 13–15	Did not advance				31
Hanna Łyczbińska	Women's foil	Bye	Volpi (ITA); L 11–15	Did not advance				30
Julia Walczyk-Klimaszyk	Women's foil	Bye	Thibus (FRA); W 15–12	Harvey (CAN); L 6–15	Did not advance			9
Martyna Jelińska; Hanna Łyczbińska; Martyna Synoradzka*; Julia Walczyk-Klimaszyk	Women's team foil	—N/a			Japan; L 30–45	Classification semifinal Egypt; W 45–21	Fifth place final France; L 44–45	6

== Golf ==
Poland entered one golfer into the Olympic tournament. Adrian Meronk (world no. 73) qualified directly among the top 60 eligible players for the men's event based on the final IGF World Rankings.

Athlete	Event	Round 1	Round 2	Round 3	Round 4	Total		
Athlete	Event	Score	Score	Score	Score	Score	Par	Rank
Adrian Meronk	Men's	73	71	72	71	287	+3	T49

== Judo ==
Poland qualified four judoka (two men and two women) for each of the following weight classes at the Games. Angelika Szymańska (women's half-middleweight, 63 kg) and Beata Pacut-Kłoczko (women's half-heavyweight, 78 kg) were selected among the top 17 judoka of their respective weight classes based on the IJF World Ranking List of June 26, 2024, while Piotr Kuczera (men's half-heavyweight, 100 kg) accepted a continental berth from Europe as the nation's top-ranked judoka outside of direct qualifying position. Adam Stodolski (men's lightweight, 73 kg) received his qualification through the reallocation of unused qoutas.

Athlete	Event	Round of 32	Round of 16	Quarterfinals	Semifinals	Repechage	Final / BM	
Athlete	Event	Opposition Result	Opposition Result	Opposition Result	Opposition Result	Opposition Result	Opposition Result	Rank
Adam Stodolski	Men's –73 kg	Lombardo (ITA); L 00–10	Did not advance					
Piotr Kuczera	Men's –100 kg	Briceño (CHI); W 10–00	Kotsoiev (AZE); L 00–10	Did not advance				
Angelika Szymańska	Women's –63 kg	Russo (ITA); W 01–00	Awiti (MEX); L 00–01	Did not advance				
Beata Pacut-Kłoczko	Women's –78 kg	Niragira (BDI); W 10–00	Steenhuis (NED); L 00–01	Did not advance				

== Modern pentathlon ==
Polish modern pentathletes confirmed three quota places for Paris 2024. Tokyo 2020 Olympian Łukasz Gutkowski secured his selection in the men's event by finishing eighth overall in the individual rankings and among the eight highest-ranked modern pentathletes eligible for qualification at the 2023 European Games in Kraków, Poland. Later on, Kamil Kasperczak and Anna Maliszewska qualified for the games through the release of final Olympic ranking.

Athlete	Event		Fencing (épée one touch)				Riding (show jumping)			Swimming (200 m freestyle)			Combined: shooting/running (10 m laser pistol)/(3000 m)			Total points	Final rank
Athlete	Event		RR	BR	Rank	MP points	Penalties	Rank	MP points	Time	Rank	MP points	Time	Rank	MP points	Total points	Final rank
Łukasz Gutkowski	Men's	Semifinal	20–15	2	5	227	0	3	300	2:06.21	14	298	10:20.74	10	680	1505	4 Q
Łukasz Gutkowski	Men's	Final	20–15	0	9	225	14	14	286	2:05.28	13	300	10:19.70	14	681	1492	15
Kamil Kasperczak	Men's	Semifinal	20–15	0	6	225	8	8	292	2:12.73	18	285	DNF		0	802	18
Kamil Kasperczak	Men's	Final	20–15	Did not advance													
Natalia Dominiak	Women's	Semifinal	14–21	0	16	195	14	17	286	2:16.84	8	277	12:09.40	12	571	1329	13
Natalia Dominiak	Women's	Final	14–21	Did not advance													
Anna Maliszewska	Women's	Semifinal	16–19	0	10	205	7	8	293	2:18.56	10	273	11:38.96	8	602	1373	11
Anna Maliszewska	Women's	Final	16–19	Did not advance													

== Rowing ==
Polish rowers qualified boats in each of the following classes through the 2023 World Rowing Championships in Belgrade, Serbia; and 2024 European Continental Qualification Regatta in Szeged, Hungary.

Athlete	Event	Heats		Repechage		Semifinals		Final	
Athlete	Event	Time	Rank	Time	Rank	Time	Rank	Time	Rank
Fabian Barański; Mateusz Biskup; Dominik Czaja; Mirosław Ziętarski	Men's quadruple sculls	5:44.39	2 FA	Bye		—N/a		5:44.59	3rd place, bronze medalist(s)
Martyna Radosz; Katarzyna Wełna	Women's lightweight double sculls	7:11.14	4 R	7:16.26	1 SA/B	7:06.69	4 FB	7:08.47	9

Qualification Legend: FA=Final A (medal); FB=Final B (non-medal); FC=Final C (non-medal); FD=Final D (non-medal); FE=Final E (non-medal); FF=Final F (non-medal); SA/B=Semifinals A/B; SC/D=Semifinals C/D; SE/F=Semifinals E/F; QF=Quarterfinals; R=Repechage

== Sailing ==
Polish sailors qualified one boat in each of the following classes through the 2023 Sailing World Championships in The Hague, Netherlands and the 2024 Last Chance Regatta in Hyères. France.

Elimination events

Athlete	Event	Race																											Final rank
Athlete	Event	1	2	3	4	5	6	7	8	9	10	11	12	13	14	QF	SF1	SF2	SF3	SF4	SF5	SF6	F1	F2	F3	F4	F5	F6	Final rank
Paweł Tarnowski	Men's IQFoil	~~12~~	3	6	2	9	2	5	5	10	10	3	11	~~23~~	—N/a	7	Did not advance												10
Maksymilian Żakowski	Men's Formula Kite	~~DSQ~~	11	14	~~15~~	11	14	10	—N/a								Did not advance												16
Maja Dziarnowska	Women's IQFoil	7	10	~~23~~	13	8	6	11	14	12	~~DSQ~~	8	4	7	2	5	Did not advance												8
Julia Damasiewicz	Women's Formula Kite	6	8	11	7	11	~~DNS~~	—N/a									3	—N/a					Did not advance						7

Medal race events

Athlete	Event	Race													Net points	Final rank
Athlete	Event	1	2	3	4	5	6	7	8	9	10	11	12	M*	Net points	Final rank
Michał Krasodomski	Men's ILCA7	36	37	~~42~~	38	37	31	17	38	—N/a				EL	276	40
Dominik Buksak; Szymon Wierzbicki	Men's 49er	10	8	6	1	~~18~~	14	8	1	13	8	5	7	5	93	5
Agata Barwińska	Women's ILCA6	~~34~~	12	30	20	6	19	2	20	11	—N/a			EL	154	15
Sandra Jankowiak; Aleksandra Melzacka	Women's 49erFX	18	3	19	11	18	14	7	~~RET~~	12	RET	2	19	EL	144	18

M = Medal race; EL = Eliminated – did not advance into the medal race

== Shooting ==
Polish shooters achieved quota places for the following events based on their results at the 2022 and 2023 ISSF World Championships, 2022, 2023, and 2024 European Championships, 2023 European Games, and 2024 ISSF World Olympic Qualification Tournament. Aneta Stankiewicz obtained a named qualification for women's 10 m air rifle from the qualification ranking.

Men

Athlete	Event	Qualification		Final	
Athlete	Event	Points	Rank	Points	Rank
Tomasz Bartnik	50 m rifle 3 positions	591	6 Q	408.8	7
Maciej Kowalewicz	50 m rifle 3 positions	579	37	Did not advance	
Tomasz Bartnik	10 m air rifle	626.1	36	Did not advance	
Maciej Kowalewicz	10 m air rifle	627.8	25	Did not advance	

Women

Athlete	Event	Qualification		Final	
Athlete	Event	Points	Rank	Points	Rank
Natalia Kochańska	50 m rifle 3 positions	589	6 Q	418.5	6
Aleksandra Pietruk	50 m rifle 3 positions	582	20	Did not advance	
Aneta Stankiewicz	10 m air rifle	627.4	21	Did not advance	
Julia Piotrowska	10 m air rifle	629.3	13	Did not advance	
Klaudia Breś	25 m pistol	573	29	Did not advance	
Klaudia Breś	10 m air pistol	573	14	Did not advance	

Mixed

Athlete	Event	Qualification		Final	
Athlete	Event	Points	Rank	Points	Rank
Tomasz Bartnik; Aneta Stankiewicz	10 m air rifle team	626.9	10	Did not advance	
Maciej Kowalewicz; Julia Piotrowska	10 m air rifle team	623.7	23	Did not advance	

== Sport climbing ==
Poland entered two climbers. Aleksandra Mirosław qualified for the games by virtue of her champion result at the 2023 European Speed Qualification Tournament in Rome, Italy. Aleksandra Kałucka obtained the qualification via the 2024 Olympic Qualifier Series.

Speed

Athlete	Event	Qualification		Round of 16	Quarterfinals	Semifinals	Final / BM	
Athlete	Event	Time	Rank	Opposition Time	Opposition Time	Opposition Time	Opposition Time	Rank
Aleksandra Kałucka	Women's	6.389	3	Tetzlaff (NZL); W 6.65	Zhou (CHN); W 6.49	Mirosław (POL); L 6.34	Sallsabillah (INA); W 6.53	3rd place, bronze medalist(s)
Aleksandra Mirosław	Women's	6.06 WR	1	Holder (RSA); W 6.10	Romero Pérez (ESP); W 6.35	Kałucka (POL); W 6.19	Deng (CHN); W 6.10	1st place, gold medalist(s)

== Swimming ==
Polish swimmers achieved the entry standards in the following events for Paris 2024 (a maximum of two swimmers under the Olympic Qualifying Time (OQT) and potentially at the Olympic Consideration Time (OCT)):

Athlete	Event	Heat		Semifinal		Final	
Athlete	Event	Time	Rank	Time	Rank	Time	Rank
Piotr Ludwiczak	Men's 50 m freestyle	22.34	35	Did not advance			
Jakub Majerski	Men's 100 m freestyle	49.44	36	Did not advance			
Jakub Majerski	Men's 100 m butterfly	51.18	9 Q	51.37	11	Did not advance	
Krzysztof Chmielewski	Men's 1500 m freestyle	15:04.99	16	—N/a		Did not advance	
Krzysztof Chmielewski	Men's 200 m butterfly	1:55.42	9 Q	1:54.28	6 Q	1:53.90	4
Michał Chmielewski	Men's 200 m butterfly	1:55.28	7 Q	1:54.64	9	Did not advance	
Ksawery Masiuk	Men's 100 m backstroke	53.08	5 Q	53.44	=12	Did not advance	
Ksawery Masiuk	Men's 200 m backstroke	1:58.01	17	Did not advance			
Jan Kałusowski	Men's 100 m breaststroke	1:00.40	22	Did not advance			
Jan Kałusowski	Men's 200 m breaststroke	2:11.87	20	Did not advance			
Piotr Woźniak	Men's 10 km open water	—N/a				2:02:38.6	22
Mateusz Chowaniec; Dominik Dudys; Bartosz Piszczorowicz; Kamil Sieradzki	Men's 4 × 100 m freestyle relay	3:14.94	13	—N/a		Did not advance	
Ksawery Masiuk; Jan Kałusowski; Jakub Majerski; Bartosz Piszczorowicz	Men's 4 x 100 m medley relay	3:33.70	10	—N/a		Did not advance	
Katarzyna Wasick	Women's 50 m freestyle	24.27	2 Q	24.23	3 Q	24.33	5
Kornelia Fiedkiewicz	Women's 50 m freestyle	24.94	20	Did not advance			
Kornelia Fiedkiewicz	Women's 100 m freestyle	55.25	20	Did not advance			
Adela Piskorska	Women's 100 m backstroke	1:00.47	17	Did not advance			
Adela Piskorska	Women's 200 m backstroke	2:13.39	24	Did not advance			
Laura Bernat	Women's 200 m backstroke	2:14.57	25	Did not advance			
Dominika Sztandera	Women's 100 m breaststroke	1:07.22	21	Did not advance			
Zuzanna Famulok; Kornelia Fiedkiewicz; Julia Maik; Katarzyna Wasick	Women's 4 × 100 m freestyle relay	3:40.67	13	—N/a		Did not advance	
Adela Piskorska; Dominika Sztandera; Paulina Peda; Kornelia Fiedkiewicz	Women's 4 × 100 m medley relay	4:00.94	12	—N/a		Did not advance	
Kacper Stokowski; Dominika Sztandera; Adrian Jaśkiewicz; Kornelia Fiedkiewicz	Mixed 4 × 100 m medley relay	3:48.19	14	—N/a		Did not advance	

== Table tennis ==
Poland entered a full squad of female athletes and one male athlete into the Games. Polish women's senior team qualified by virtue of the results as one of the four highest team, not yet qualified, through the final ITTF teams ranking. Later on, Miłosz Redzimski obtained one of five available spots at the men's singles event through the 2024 European Qualification Tournament in Sarajevo, Bosnia and Herzegovina.

Athlete	Event	Preliminary	Round of 64	Round of 32	Round of 16	Quarterfinals	Semifinals	Final / BM	
Athlete	Event	Opposition Result	Opposition Result	Opposition Result	Opposition Result	Opposition Result	Opposition Result	Opposition Result	Rank
Miłosz Redzimski	Men's singles	Bye	El-Beiali (EGY); W 4–0	Lind (DEN); L 3–4	Did not advance				
Natalia Bajor	Women's singles	Bye	Sawettabut (THA); W 4–3	Fu (POR); W 4–3	Cheng (TPE); L 0–4	Did not advance			
Katarzyna Węgrzyn	Women's singles	Dheema Ali (MDV); W 4–0	Bergström (SWE); L 1–4	Did not advance					
Natalia Bajor; Anna Węgrzyn; Zuzanna Wielgos	Women's team	—N/a			Japan; L 0–3	Did not advance			

== Tennis ==
Poland entered four tennis players (all women) into the Olympic tournament. Iga Świątek (world no. 1), Magda Linette (world no. 44), and Magdalena Fręch (world no. 52) qualified directly as one of the top 56 eligible players in the WTA World Rankings of June 10, 2024. Having been directly entered to the singles, Linette opted to play with Alicja Rosolska in the women's doubles by virtue of their combined WTA ranking.

Athlete	Event	Round of 64	Round of 32	Round of 16	Quarterfinals	Semifinals	Final / BM	
Athlete	Event	Opposition Score	Opposition Score	Opposition Score	Opposition Score	Opposition Score	Opposition Score	Rank
Magdalena Fręch	Women's singles	Tomova (BUL); L 4–6, 6–7^{(4–7)}	Did not advance					
Magda Linette	Women's singles	Andreeva (AIN); W 6–3, 6–4	Paolini (ITA); L 4–6, 1–6	Did not advance				
Iga Świątek	Women's singles	Begu (ROU); W 6–2, 7–5	Parry (FRA); W 6–1, 6–1	Wang (CHN); W 6–3, 6–4	Collins (USA); W 6–1, 2–6, 4–1, ret	Zheng (CHN); L 2–6, 5–7	Schmiedlová (SVK); W 6–2, 6–1	3rd place, bronze medalist(s)
Magda Linette; Alicja Rosolska	Women's doubles	—N/a	Kostyuk / Yastremska (UKR); L 4–6, 1–6	Did not advance				

== Triathlon ==
Poland was assigned the European quota to the highest-ranked remaining triathlete whose NOC has not yet qualified for the women's event.

Individual

Athlete	Event	Time						Rank
Athlete	Event	Swim (1.5 km)	Trans 1	Bike (40 km)	Trans 2	Run (10 km)	Total	Rank
Roksana Słupek	Women's	23:33	0:57	58:18	0:29	33:59	1:57:16	13

== Volleyball ==
=== Beach ===
Polish men's pair qualified for Paris based on the FIVB Beach Volleyball Olympic Ranking.

Athletes	Event	Preliminary round				Round of 16	Quarterfinal	Semifinal	Final / BM	
Athletes	Event	Opposition Score	Opposition Score	Opposition Score	Rank	Opposition Score	Opposition Score	Opposition Score	Opposition Score	Rank
Michał Bryl; Bartosz Łosiak	Men's	Hodges / Schubert (AUS); W (21–16, 21–16)	Bassereau / Lyneel (FRA); W (21–15, 21-18)	Ehlers / Wickler (GER); L (19–21, 15–21)	2 Q	Herrera / Gavira (ESP); L (20–22, 18–21)	Did not advance			9

=== Indoor ===
Summary

Team	Event	Group stage				Quarterfinal	Semifinal	Final / BM	
Team	Event	Opposition Score	Opposition Score	Opposition Score	Rank	Opposition Score	Opposition Score	Opposition Score	Rank
Poland men's	Men's tournament	Egypt; W 3–0	Brazil; W 3–2	Italy; L 1–3	2 Q	Slovenia; W 3–1	United States; W 3–2	France; L 0–3	2nd place, silver medalist(s)
Poland women's	Women's tournament	Japan; W 3–1	Kenya; W 3–0	Brazil; L 0–3	2 Q	United States; L 0–3	Did not advance		

==== Men's tournament ====
Poland men's volleyball team qualified for Paris by securing an outright berth as one of the two highest-ranked nations at the Olympic Qualification Tournament in Xi'an, China.

Team roster

The roster was announced on 8 July 2024.

Head coach: (Serbia) Nikola Grbić

- 5 Łukasz Kaczmarek OP
- 6 Bartosz Kurek (c) OP
- 9 Wilfredo León OH
- 11 Aleksander Śliwka OH
- 12 Grzegorz Łomacz S
- 15 Jakub Kochanowski MB
- 16 Kamil Semeniuk OH
- 17 Paweł Zatorski L
- 19 Marcin Janusz S
- 20 Mateusz Bieniek MB
- 21 Tomasz Fornal OH
- 30 Bartłomiej Bołądź OP
- 99 Norbert Huber MB

Alternate:

- 30 Bartłomiej Bołądź OP replaced Mateusz Bieniek MB

Group play

Pos	Team	Pld	W	L	Pts	SW	SL	SR	SPW	SPL	SPR	Qualification
1	Italy	3	3	0	9	9	2	4.500	269	224	1.201	Quarterfinals
2	Poland	3	2	1	5	7	5	1.400	260	256	1.016	Quarterfinals
3	Brazil	3	1	2	4	6	6	1.000	273	241	1.133	Quarterfinals
4	Egypt	3	0	3	0	0	9	0.000	144	225	0.640	

Source: Olympics
Rules for classification: Tiebreakers

27 July 2024; 17:00	Poland	3–0	Egypt	South Paris Arena 1, Paris; Attendance: 9,408; Referees: Epaminondas Gerothodoros (GRE), Ivaylo Ivanov (BUL)
27 July 2024; 17:00	(25–21, 25–19, 25–13); P2 Report			South Paris Arena 1, Paris; Attendance: 9,408; Referees: Epaminondas Gerothodoros (GRE), Ivaylo Ivanov (BUL)

31 July 2024; 09:00	Poland	3–2	Brazil	South Paris Arena 1, Paris; Attendance: 9,464; Referees: Stefano Cesare (ITA), Denny Cespedes (DOM)
31 July 2024; 09:00	(22–25, 25–19, 19–25, 25–23, 15–12); P2 Report			South Paris Arena 1, Paris; Attendance: 9,464; Referees: Stefano Cesare (ITA), Denny Cespedes (DOM)

3 August 2024; 17:00	Poland	1–3	Italy	South Paris Arena 1, Paris; Attendance: 9,441; Referees: Juraj Mokrý (SVK), Denny Cespedes (DOM)
3 August 2024; 17:00	(15–25, 18–25, 26–24, 20–25); P2 Report			South Paris Arena 1, Paris; Attendance: 9,441; Referees: Juraj Mokrý (SVK), Denny Cespedes (DOM)

Quarterfinal

5 August 2024; 09:00	Slovenia	1–3	Poland	South Paris Arena 1, Paris; Attendance: 9,274; Referees: Scott Dziewirz (CAN), Stefano Cesare (ITA)
5 August 2024; 09:00	(20–25, 26–24, 19–25, 20–25); P2 Report			South Paris Arena 1, Paris; Attendance: 9,274; Referees: Scott Dziewirz (CAN), Stefano Cesare (ITA)

Semifinal

7 August 2024; 16:00	Poland	3–2	United States	South Paris Arena 1, Paris; Attendance: 9,333; Referees: Stefano Cesare (ITA), Fabrice Collados (FRA)
7 August 2024; 16:00	(25–23, 25–27, 14–25, 25–23, 15–13); P2 Report			South Paris Arena 1, Paris; Attendance: 9,333; Referees: Stefano Cesare (ITA), Fabrice Collados (FRA)

Gold medal game

10 August 2024; 13:00	France	3–0	Poland	South Paris Arena 1, Paris; Attendance: 9,233; Referees: Stefano Cesare (ITA), Hamid Al-Rousi (UAE)
10 August 2024; 13:00	(25–19, 25–20, 25–23); P2 Report			South Paris Arena 1, Paris; Attendance: 9,233; Referees: Stefano Cesare (ITA), Hamid Al-Rousi (UAE)

==== Women's tournament ====
Poland women's volleyball team qualified for the Games by securing an outright berth as the one of two highest-ranked nations at the Olympic Qualification Tournament in Łódź.

Team roster

The roster was announced on 6 July 2024.

Head coach: (Italy) Stefano Lavarini

- 1 Maria Stenzel L
- 3 Klaudia Alagierska MB
- 5 Agnieszka Korneluk MB
- 9 Magdalena Stysiak OP
- 11 Martyna Łukasik OH
- 12 Aleksandra Szczygłowska L
- 14 Joanna Wołosz (c) S
- 15 Martyna Czyrniańska OH
- 17 Malwina Smarzek OP
- 26 Katarzyna Wenerska S
- 41 Natalia Mędrzyk OH
- 95 Magdalena Jurczyk MB

Group play

Pos	Team	Pld	W	L	Pts	SW	SL	SR	SPW	SPL	SPR	Qualification
1	Brazil	3	3	0	9	9	0	MAX	238	165	1.442	Quarter-finals
2	Poland	3	2	1	6	6	4	1.500	244	230	1.061	Quarter-finals
3	Japan	3	1	2	3	4	6	0.667	226	224	1.009	
4	Kenya	3	0	3	0	0	9	0.000	136	225	0.604	

Source: Olympics
Rules for classification: Tiebreakers

28 July 2024; 13:00	Poland	3–1	Japan	South Paris Arena 1, Paris; Attendance: 9,162; Referees: Karina Rene (ARG), Wang Ziling (CHN)
28 July 2024; 13:00	(20–25, 25–22, 25–23, 28–26); P2 Report			South Paris Arena 1, Paris; Attendance: 9,162; Referees: Karina Rene (ARG), Wang Ziling (CHN)

31 July 2024; 21:00	Poland	3–0	Kenya	South Paris Arena 1, Paris; Attendance: 9,447; Referees: Angela Grass (BRA), Wael Kandil (EGY)
31 July 2024; 21:00	(25–14, 25–17, 25–15); P2 Report			South Paris Arena 1, Paris; Attendance: 9,447; Referees: Angela Grass (BRA), Wael Kandil (EGY)

4 August 2024; 21:00	Brazil	3–0	Poland	South Paris Arena 1, Paris; Attendance: 9,505; Referees: Fabrice Collados (FRA), Denny Cespedes (DOM)
4 August 2024; 21:00	(25–21, 38–36, 25–14); P2 Report			South Paris Arena 1, Paris; Attendance: 9,505; Referees: Fabrice Collados (FRA), Denny Cespedes (DOM)

Quarterfinal

6 August 2024; 17:00	United States	3–0	Poland	South Paris Arena 1, Paris; Attendance: 9,244; Referees: Karina Rene (ARG), Vladimir Simonović (SUI)
6 August 2024; 17:00	(25–22, 25–14, 25–20); P2 Report			South Paris Arena 1, Paris; Attendance: 9,244; Referees: Karina Rene (ARG), Vladimir Simonović (SUI)

== Weightlifting ==
Poland entered one weightlifter into the Olympic competition. Weronika Zielińska-Stubińska (women's 81 kg) secured one quota places through the re-allocations of unused IWF Olympic Continental Qualification Ranking.

Athlete	Event	Snatch		Clean & Jerk		Total	Rank
Athlete	Event	Result	Rank	Result	Rank	Total	Rank
Weronika Zielińska-Stubińska	Women's −81 kg	~~107~~	DNF	—	—	—	DNF

== Wrestling ==
Poland qualified one wrestlers for each of the following classes into the Olympic competition. Anhelina Lysak qualified for the games by virtue of top five results through the 2023 World Championships in Belgrade, Serbia; Wiktoria Chołuj qualified for the games by winning the semifinal match at the 2024 European Qualification Tournament in Baku, Azerbaijan; meanwhile Zbigniew Baranowski and Arkadiusz Kułynycz qualified for the games through the 2024 World Qualification Tournament in Istanbul, Turkey. Poland received a quota due to reallocations of Individual Neutral Athletes (AIN).

Key:

- VT (ranking points: 5–0 or 0–5) – Victory by fall.
- VB (ranking points: 5–0 or 0–5) – Victory by injury (VF for forfeit, VA for withdrawal or disqualification)
- PP (ranking points: 3–1 or 1–3) – Decision by points – the loser with technical points.
- PO (ranking points: 3–0 or 0–3) – Decision by points – the loser without technical points.
- ST (ranking points: 4–0 or 0–4) – Great superiority – the loser without technical points and a margin of victory of at least 8 (Greco-Roman) or 10 (freestyle) points.
- SP (ranking points: 4–1 or 1–4) – Technical superiority – the loser with technical points and a margin of victory of at least 8 (Greco-Roman) or 10 (freestyle) points.

Freestyle

Athlete	Event	Round of 16	Quarterfinal	Semifinal	Repechage	Final / BM	
Athlete	Event	Opposition Result	Opposition Result	Opposition Result	Opposition Result	Opposition Result	Rank
Zbigniew Baranowski	Men's −97 kg	Lefter (MDA); W 3–1 ^{PP}	Magomedov (AZE); L 1–3 ^{PP}	Did not advance			
Robert Baran	Men's −125 kg	Batirmurzaev (KAZ); W 3–1 ^{PP}	Petriashvili (GEO); L 1–3 ^{PP}	Did not advance	Khotsianivskyi (UKR); W 3–0 ^{PO}	Meshvildishvili (AZE); L 1–3 ^{PP}	5
Anhelina Łysak	Women's −57 kg	Hrushyna (UKR); L 1–3 ^{PP}	Did not advance				
Wiktoria Chołuj	Women's −68 kg	Zhou (CHN); W 3–1 ^{PP}	Elor (USA); L 0–3 ^{PO}	Did not advance	Tosun (TUR); L 1–3 ^{PP}	Did not advance	

Greco-Roman

Athlete	Event	Round of 16	Quarterfinal	Semifinal	Repechage	Final / BM	
Athlete	Event	Opposition Result	Opposition Result	Opposition Result	Opposition Result	Opposition Result	Rank
Arkadiusz Kułynycz	Men's −87 kg	Cengiz (TUR); W 3–1 ^{PP}	Mohmadi (IRI); L 1–4 ^{SP}	Did not advance	Muñoz (COL); W 3–1 ^{PP}	Beleniuk (UKR); L 1–3 ^{PP}	5

== See also ==
- Poland at the 2024 Winter Youth Olympics
- Poland at the 2024 Summer Paralympics
