= Modern pentathlon at the 2023 European Games – Women's individual =

Women's individual modern pentathlon at the 2023 European Games
- Venue: AWF Sports Centre
- Location: Kraków, Poland
- Date: 25 June (qualification); 26–27 June (semifinals); 1 July (final)
- Competitors: 59 from 22 nations
- Winning total: 1443

Medalists
gold medal	Alice Sotero	Italy
silver medal	Laura Heredia	Spain
bronze medal	Olivia Green	Great Britain

The women's individual modern pentathlon competition at the 2023 European Games in Kraków was held from 25 June to 1 July 2023.

== Results ==
=== Qualification ===
==== Qualification A ====
Rank	Athlete	Nation	Fencing Victories (pts)	Swimming Time (pts)	Laser run Time (pts)	Total	Notes
1	Alice Sotero	Italy	20 (250)	2:10.56 (289)	12:26.9 (554)	1093	Q
2	Natalia Dominiak	Poland	18 (236)	2:15.07 (280)	12:15.2 (565)	1081	Q
3	Annika Zillekens	Germany	16 (222)	2:16.13 (278)	12:00.6 (580)	1080	Q
4	Elena Micheli	Italy	15 (215)	2:10.86 (289)	12:04.9 (576)	1080	Q
5	Anaïs Eudes	Belgium	16 (222)	2:17.23 (276)	11:59.8 (581)	1079	Q
6	Anna Maliszewska	Poland	15 (215)	2:17.65 (275)	11:56.0 (584)	1074	Q
7	Sharon Tal	Israel	16 (222)	2:27.72 (255)	11:43.2 (597)	1074	Q
8	Gintarė Venčkauskaitė	Lithuania	14 (208)	2:17.20 (276)	11:50.8 (590)	1074	Q
9	Sive Brassil	Ireland	12 (194)	2:13.87 (283)	11:46.2 (594)	1071	Q
10	Elzbieta Adomaitytė	Lithuania	18 (236)	2:27.82 (255)	12:01.4 (579)	1070	Q
11	Karolína Křenková	Czech Republic	15 (215)	2:14.45 (282)	12:09.0 (571)	1068	Q
12	Olha Klunnikova	Ukraine	18 (236)	2:14.90 (281)	12:29.9 (551)	1068	Q
13	Olivia Green	Great Britain	19 (243)	2:16.21 (278)	12:35.5 (545)	1066	Q
14	Élodie Clouvel	France	16 (222)	2:10.11 (290)	12:27.2 (553)	1065	Q
15	Kerenza Bryson	Great Britain	20 (250)	2:23.70 (263)	12:28.6 (552)	1065	Q
16	Marie Oteiza	France	18 (236)	2:13.88 (283)	12:34.6 (546)	1065	Q
17	Lea Egloff	Switzerland	16 (222)	2:18.45 (274)	12:17.2 (563)	1059	Q
18	Luca Barta	Hungary	13 (201)	2:19.75 (271)	11:55.6 (585)	1057	Q
19	Kamilla Réti	Hungary	14 (208)	2:27.53 (255)	12:01.4 (579)	1042	
20	Anastasiia Chyzhova	Ukraine	10 (180)	2:15.72 (279)	12:18.4 (562)	1021	
21	Ralitsa Miteva	Bulgaria	3 (131)	2:16.17 (278)	11:34.8 (606)	1015	
22	Isobel Radford Dodd	Ireland	13 (201)	2:15.93 (279)	12:47.0 (533)	1013	
23	Sıdal Aslan	Turkey	13 (201)	2:20.28 (270)	12:52.6 (528)	999	
24	Cicelle Leh	Germany	8 (166)	2:23.27 (264)	12:18.2 (562)	992	
25	Ariadni Naskari	Greece	12 (194)	2:42.83 (225)	12:24.8 (556)	975	
26	Florina Jurt	Switzerland	3 (131)	2:23.07 (264)	12:08.5 (572)	967	
27	İpek Akşin	Turkey	6 (152)	2:12.69 (285)	12:56.9 (524)	961	
28	Kristina Tchitadze	Georgia	11 (187)	2:27.76 (255)	13:38.4 (482)	924	
29	Johanna Maria Jõgisu	Estonia	12 (194)	2:23.27 (264)	DNS (0)	458	

==== Qualification B ====
Rank	Athlete	Nation	Fencing Victories (pts)	Swimming Time (pts)	Laser run Time (pts)	Total	Notes
1	İlke Özyüksel	Turkey	14 (208)	2:13.62 (283)	11:24.0 (616)	1107	Q
2	Laura Asadauskaitė	Lithuania	15 (215)	2:20.25 (270)	11:18.1 (622)	1107	Q
3	Alessandra Frezza	Italy	19 (243)	2:18.74 (273)	11:49.4 (591)	1107	Q
4	Marta Kobecka	Poland	18 (236)	2:16.45 (278)	11:48.2 (592)	1106	Q
5	Marlena Jawaid	Sweden	20 (250)	2:14.91 (281)	12:05.2 (575)	1106	Q
6	Iryna Khokhlova	Ukraine	20 (250)	2:20.51 (269)	11:53.9 (587)	1106	Q
7	Michelle Gulyás	Hungary	18 (236)	2:10.02 (290)	12:01.7 (579)	1105	Q
8	Valeriya Permykina	Ukraine	18 (236)	2:18.54 (273)	11:45.0 (595)	1104	Q
9	Emma Whitaker	Great Britain	15 (215)	2:15.76 (279)	11:30.1 (610)	1104	Q
10	Blanka Guzi	Hungary	10 (180)	2:14.94 (281)	10:57.8 (643)	1104	Q
11	Rebecca Langrehr	Germany	17 (229)	2:17.97 (275)	11:40.9 (600)	1104	Q
12	Anna Jurt	Switzerland	14 (208)	2:26.12 (258)	11:03.0 (637)	1103	Q
13	Lucie Hlaváčková	Czech Republic	15 (215)	2:19.25 (272)	11:24.2 (616)	1103	Q
14	Rebecca Castaudi	France	16 (222)	2:22.65 (265)	11:24.3 (616)	1103	Q
15	Laura Heredia	Spain	13 (201)	2:22.20 (266)	11:05.2 (635)	1102	Q
16	Janine Kohlmann	Germany	14 (208)	2:16.35 (278)	11:24.3 (616)	1102	Q
17	Jessye Gomesse	France	18 (236)	2:18.28 (274)	11:49.3 (591)	1101	Q
18	Ieva Serapinaitė	Lithuania	14 (208)	2:12.96 (285)	11:37.2 (603)	1096	Q
19	Oktawia Nowacka	Poland	22 (264)	2:14.54 (281)	12:41.3 (539)	1084	
20	Jessica Varley	Great Britain	14 (208)	2:20.26 (270)	11:35.3 (605)	1083	
21	Yaren Nur Polat	Turkey	14 (208)	2:18.21 (274)	11:44.2 (596)	1078	
22	Veronika Novotná	Czech Republic	13 (201)	2:17.84 (275)	11:47.6 (593)	1069	
23	Andrea Medina	Spain	12 (194)	2:16.93 (277)	11:59.5 (581)	1052	
24	Katharina Jurt	Switzerland	9 (173)	2:21.36 (268)	11:34.4 (606)	1047	
25	Laura Salminen	Finland	14 (208)	2:18.17 (274)	12:32.4 (548)	1030	
26	Francesca Tognetti	Italy	13 (191)	2:19.30 (272)	12:23.4 (557)	1020	
27	Hanna D'Aughton	Ireland	10 (180)	2:19.21 (272)	13:17.4 (503)	955	
28	Dimitra Patsoura	Greece	6 (152)	2:41.90 (227)	12:34.6 (546)	925	
29	Pinelopi Nika	Greece	8 (166)	3:14.61 (161)	11:49.1 (591)	918	
30	Lisa Sophie Axmann	Austria	6 (152)	2:24.65 (261)	13:36.4 (484)	897	

=== Semifinals ===
==== Semifinal A ====
Rank	Athlete	Nation	Fencing RR+BR Victories (pts)	Swimming Time (pts)	Laser run Time (pts)	Total	Notes
1	Elena Micheli	Italy	18+0 (215)	2:11.91 (287)	11:15.0 (625)	1127	Q
2	Gintarė Venčkauskaitė	Lithuania	18+3 (221)	2:17.91 (275)	11:13.0 (627)	1123	Q
3	Alice Sotero	Italy	23+0 (240)	2:09.91 (291)	11:50.3 (590)	1121	Q
4	Luca Barta	Hungary	21+3 (236)	2:17.91 (276)	11:37.2 (603)	1115	Q
5	Olivia Green	Great Britain	18+0 (215)	2:13.91 (284)	11:27.9 (613)	1112	Q
6	Kerenza Bryson	Great Britain	21+0 (230)	2:21.91 (268)	11:27.7 (613)	1111	Q
7	Annika Zillekens	Germany	20+0 (225)	2:17.91 (275)	11:29.5 (611)	1111	Q
8	Lucie Hlaváčková	Czech Republic	15+0 (200)	2:21.91 (268)	10:59.7 (641)	1109	Q
9	Marie Oteiza	France	18+1 (217)	2:16.91 (278)	11:28.3 (612)	1107	Q
10	Natalia Dominiak	Poland	15+1 (202)	2:17.91 (276)	11:18.5 (622)	1100	
11	Iryna Khokhlova	Ukraine	19+0 (220)	2:20.91 (270)	11:30.9 (610)	1100	
12	Sharon Tal	Israel	20+0 (225)	2:27.91 (255)	11:21.4 (619)	1099	
13	Lea Egloff	Switzerland	21+0 (230)	2:22.91 (266)	11:38.8 (602)	1098	
14	Élodie Clouvel	France	20+0 (225)	2:11.91 (288)	11:55.6 (585)	1098	
15	Anna Maliszewska	Poland	16+2 (209)	2:19.91 (271)	11:29.1 (611)	1091	
16	Olha Klunnikova	Ukraine	19+2 (224)	2:15.91 (280)	11:57.9 (583)	1087	
17	Marlena Jawaid	Sweden	20+4 (233)	2:17.91 (275)	12:05.1 (575)	1083	
18	Elzbieta Adomaitytė	Lithuania	20+1 (227)	2:28.91 (254)	11:52.1 (588)	1069	

==== Semifinal B ====
Rank	Athlete	Nation	Fencing RR+BR Victories (pts)	Swimming Time (pts)	Laser run Time (pts)	Total	Notes
1	Rebecca Langrehr	Germany	21+2 (234)	2:16.23 (278)	11:39.3 (601)	1113	Q
2	Michelle Gulyás	Hungary	17+1 (212)	2:09.51 (291)	11:31.1 (609)	1112	Q
3	Laura Heredia	Spain	19+4 (228)	2:21.94 (267)	11:23.3 (617)	1112	Q
4	Laura Asadauskaitė	Lithuania	17+1 (212)	2:20.47 (270)	11:13.0 (627)	1109	Q
5	Ieva Serapinaitė	Lithuania	19+0 (220)	2:11.73 (287)	11:40.3 (600)	1107	Q
6	Blanka Guzi	Hungary	10+0 (175)	2:15.14 (280)	10:48.9 (652)	1107	Q
7	Emma Whitaker	Great Britain	20+0 (225)	2:17.91 (275)	11:34.0 (606)	1106	Q
8	Janine Kohlmann	Germany	20+0 (225)	2:16.69 (277)	11:36.4 (604)	1106	Q
9	Rebecca Castaudi	France	16+2 (209)	2:22.06 (266)	11:11.1 (629)	1104	Q
10	Anaïs Eudes	Belgium	19+1 (222)	2:19.09 (272)	11:32.6 (608)	1102	
11	Alessandra Frezza	Italy	17+0 (210)	2:20.51 (269)	11:37.2 (603)	1082	
12	İlke Özyüksel	Turkey	11+1 (182)	2:14.78 (281)	11:25.3 (615)	1078	
13	Jessye Gomesse	France	11+1 (182)	2:20.73 (269)	11:16.3 (624)	1075	
14	Anna Jurt	Switzerland	12+3 (191)	2:29.09 (252)	11:16.0 (624)	1067	
15	Sive Brassil	Ireland	12+0 (185)	2:17.03 (276)	11:43.2 (597)	1058	
16	Karolína Křenková	Czech Republic	15+0 (200)	2:18.01 (274)	11:58.2 (582)	1056	
17	Valeriya Permykina	Ukraine	12+0 (185)	2:19.59 (271)	11:41.3 (599)	1055	
18	Marta Kobecka	Poland	14+2 (199)	2:16.68 (277)	12:10.2 (570)	1046	

=== Final ===
Rank	Athlete	Nation	Fencing RR+BR Victories (pts)	Riding (pts)	Swimming Time (pts)	Laser run Time (pts)	Total
1st place, gold medalist(s)	Alice Sotero	Italy	23+1 (244)	(293)	2:09.02 (292)	11:26.3 (614)	1443
2nd place, silver medalist(s)	Laura Heredia	Spain	19+0 (220)	(300)	2:20.31 (270)	11:01.6 (639)	1429
3rd place, bronze medalist(s)	Olivia Green	Great Britain	18+1 (217)	(286)	2:14.35 (282)	10:57.4 (643)	1428
4	Laura Asadauskaitė	Lithuania	17+0 (210)	(293)	2:21.86 (267)	10:50.1 (650)	1420
5	Marie Oteiza	France	18+4 (223)	(299)	2:14.21 (282)	11:25.1 (615)	1419
6	Kerenza Bryson	Great Britain	21+1 (232)	(286)	2:22.59 (265)	11:06.3 (634)	1417
7	Michelle Gulyás	Hungary	17+0 (210)	(299)	2:09.55 (291)	11:25.8 (615)	1415
8	Annika Zillekens	Germany	20+1 (227)	(299)	2:17.87 (275)	11:28.5 (612)	1413
9	Gintarė Venčkauskaitė	Lithuania	18+0 (215)	(276)	2:18.44 (274)	10:54.4 (646)	1411
10	Rebecca Langrehr	Germany	21+1 (232)	(298)	2:16.11 (278)	11:43.3 (597)	1405
11	Elena Micheli	Italy	18+0 (215)	(272)	2:11.11 (288)	11:13.2 (627)	1402
12	Janine Kohlmann	Germany	20+1 (227)	(293)	2:16.34 (278)	11:40.5 (600)	1398
13	Luca Barta	Hungary	21+1 (232)	(300)	2:16.99 (277)	12:07.3 (573)	1382
14	Blanka Guzi	Hungary	10+0 (175)	(286)	2:19.30 (272)	11:00.7 (640)	1373
15	Ieva Serapinaitė	Lithuania	19+2 (224)	(277)	2:12.04 (286)	11:56.4 (584)	1371
16	Rebecca Castaudi	France	16+0 (205)	(300)	2:24.21 (262)	11:48.5 (592)	1359
17	Emma Whitaker	Great Britain	20+0 (225)	(292)	2:17.43 (276)	12:50.1 (530)	1323
18	Lucie Hlaváčková	Czech Republic	15+4 (208)	(0)	2:20.59 (269)	11:25.9 (615)	1092

=== Team standings ===
Rank	Nation	Athlete	Reached level	Points	Team points
1st place, gold medalist(s)	Germany	Annika Zillekens	F	1413	4216
1st place, gold medalist(s)	Germany	Rebecca Langrehr	F	1405	4216
1st place, gold medalist(s)	Germany	Janine Kohlmann	F	1398	4216
2nd place, silver medalist(s)	Lithuania	Laura Asadauskaitė	F	1420	4202
2nd place, silver medalist(s)	Lithuania	Gintarė Venčkauskaitė	F	1411	4202
2nd place, silver medalist(s)	Lithuania	Ieva Serapinaitė	F	1371	4202
3rd place, bronze medalist(s)	Hungary	Michelle Gulyás	F	1415	4170
3rd place, bronze medalist(s)	Hungary	Luca Barta	F	1382	4170
3rd place, bronze medalist(s)	Hungary	Blanka Guzi	F	1373	4170
4	Great Britain	Olivia Green	F	1428	4168
4	Great Britain	Kerenza Bryson	F	1417	4168
4	Great Britain	Emma Whitaker	F	1323	4168
5	Italy	Alice Sotero	F	1443	3927
5	Italy	Elena Micheli	F	1402	3927
5	Italy	Alessandra Frezza	SF	1082	3927
6	France	Marie Oteiza	F	1419	3876
6	France	Rebecca Castaudi	F	1359	3876
6	France	Élodie Clouvel	SF	1098	3876
7	Czech Republic	Lucie Hlaváčková	F	1092	3217
7	Czech Republic	Karolína Křenková	SF	1056	3217
7	Czech Republic	Veronika Novotná	Q	1069	3217
8	Ukraine	Iryna Khokhlova	SF	1100	3242
8	Ukraine	Olha Klunnikova	SF	1087	3242
8	Ukraine	Valeriya Permykina	SF	1055	3242
9	Poland	Natalia Dominiak	SF	1100	3237
9	Poland	Anna Maliszewska	SF	1091	3237
9	Poland	Marta Kobecka	SF	1046	3237
10	Switzerland	Lea Egloff	SF	1098	3212
10	Switzerland	Anna Jurt	SF	1067	3212
10	Switzerland	Katharina Jurt	Q	1047	3212
11	Turkey	İlke Özyüksel	SF	1078	3155
11	Turkey	Yaren Nur Polat	Q	1078	3155
11	Turkey	Sıdal Aslan	Q	999	3155
12	Ireland	Sive Brassil	SF	1058	3026
12	Ireland	Isobel Radford Dodd	Q	1013	3026
12	Ireland	Hanna D'Aughton	Q	955	3026
13	Greece	Ariadni Naskari	Q	975	2818
13	Greece	Dimitra Patsoura	Q	925	2818
13	Greece	Pinelopi Nika	Q	918	2818
