= Modern pentathlon at the 2018 Summer Youth Olympics =

Modern pentathlon at the III Summer Youth Olympic Games
- Venue: Parque Polideportivo Roca; Tecnópolis
- Dates: October 12–16
- No. of events: 3 (1 boys, 1 girls, 1 mixed)
- Competitors: 48 from 30 nations

Modern pentathlon at the 2018 Summer Youth Olympics was held from 12 to 16 October. The events took place at the Parque Polideportivo Roca and Tecnópolis in Buenos Aires, Argentina.

== Qualification ==
Each National Olympic Committee (NOC) can enter a maximum of 2 competitors, 1 per each gender. As hosts, Argentina was given the maximum quota and a further 4, 2 in each gender was initially given to the Tripartite Commission. The remaining 42 places shall be decided in three stages; firstly four continental qualification tournaments held in 2017, second the 2018 World Youth A Championships and finally the Olympic Youth Pentathlon World Rankings. Should a nation qualify more than 1 athlete per gender the nation will be allowed to choose which athlete will compete.

Each athlete will compete in both the individual and mixed events. To be eligible to participate at the Youth Olympics athletes must have been born between 1 January 2000 and 31 December 2003.

=== Boys ===
Event	Location	Date	Total Places	Qualified
Host Nation	-	-	1	Argentina
European Youth Olympic Games Qualifications	(Portugal) Caldas da Rainha	10–13 August 2017	3	Giorgio Malan (ITA); Kamil Kasperczak (POL); Egor Gromadskii (RUS)
Pan American Youth Olympic Qualification	(Mexico) Mérida	30 Aug.–1 Sept. 2017	2	Sergio Flores (MEX); Ángel Hernández (VEN)
Asia/Oceania Youth Olympic Qualification	(Japan) Gotenba	14 September 2017	2	Shin Hyoseop (KOR)*; Zhao Zhonghao (CHN)
Asia/Oceania Youth Olympic Qualification	(Japan) Gotenba	14 September 2017	1	Keaan Van Venrooij (AUS)
Africa Youth Olympic Qualification	(Nigeria) Lagos	5–6 December 2017	1	Rhys Poovan (RSA)
Youth A World Championships	(Portugal) Caldas da Rainha	7–16 April 2018	6	Ahmed El Gendy (EGY); Hugo Fleurot (FRA); Jozsef Tamas (HUN); Uladziaslau Astrouski (BLR); Toby Price (GBR); Moon Juseong (KOR)*
Olympic Youth A Pentathlon World Ranking	-	1 July 2018	6	
Tripartite Invitation	-	-	2	
TOTAL			24	

* NOC must decide which athlete to send.

=== Girls ===
Event	Location	Date	Total Places	Qualified
Host Nation	-	-	1	Argentina*
European Youth Olympic Games Qualifications	(Portugal) Caldas da Rainha	10–13 August 2017	3	Michelle Gulyas (HUN); Beatrice Mercuri (ITA)*; Laura Heredia (ESP)
Pan American Youth Olympic Qualification	(Mexico) Mérida	30 Aug.–1 Sept. 2017	2	Melissa Mireles (MEX); Maria Ieda (BRA)
Asia/Oceania Youth Olympic Qualification	(Japan) Gotenba	14 September 2017	2	Yuan Xin (CHN)*; Yoon Yangji (KOR)
Asia/Oceania Youth Olympic Qualification	(Japan) Gotenba	14 September 2017	1	Nikita Mawhirt (AUS)
Africa Youth Olympic Qualification	(Nigeria) Lagos	5–6 December 2017	1	Alida van der Merwe (RSA)
Youth A World Championships	(Portugal) Caldas da Rainha	7–16 April 2018	6	Alice Rinaudo (ITA)*; Gu Yewen (CHN)*; Salma Abdelmaksoud (EGY); Martina Armanazqui (ARG)*; Emma Riff (FRA); Anna Jurt (SUI)
Olympic Youth A Pentathlon World Ranking	-	1 July 2018	6	
Tripartite Invitation	-	-	2	
TOTAL			24	

* NOC must decide which athlete to send.

== Medal summary ==
=== Medal table ===
Rank	Nation	Gold	Silver	Bronze	Total
1	Egypt	2	0	0	2
–	Mixed-NOCs	1	1	1	3
2	France	0	1	1	2
3	Russia	0	1	0	1
4	Hungary	0	0	1	1
Totals (4 entries)		3	3	3	9

=== Events ===
Event	Gold	Silver	Bronze
Boys' individual	Ahmed Elgendy; Egypt	Egor Gromadskii; Russia	Ugo Fleurot; France
Girls' individual	Salma Abdelmaksoud; Egypt	Emma Riff; France	Michelle Gulyás; Hungary
Mixed relay	Gu Yewen; China; Ahmed Elgendy; Egypt	Salma Abdelmaksoud; Egypt; Franco Serrano; Argentina	Laura Heredia; Spain; Kamil Kasperczak; Poland
