= Modern pentathlon at the 2018 Summer Youth Olympics – Girls' individual =

Girls' individual at the III Summer Youth Olympic Games
- Venue: Parque Polideportivo Roca
- Dates: 12–13 October
- Competitors: 24 from 24 nations
- Winning total: 1067

Medalists
1st place, gold medalist(s)		Salma Abdelmaksoud	Egypt
2nd place, silver medalist(s)		Emma Riff	France
3rd place, bronze medalist(s)		Michelle Gulyás	Hungary

These are the results for the girls' individual event at the 2018 Summer Youth Olympics.

== Results ==
Rank	Athlete	Nation	Fencing RR+BR Victories (pts)	Swimming Time (pts)	Laser run Time (pts)	Total
1st place, gold medalist(s)	Salma Abdelmaksoud	Egypt	13+2 (228)	2:13.87 (283)	12:24.86 (556)	1067
2nd place, silver medalist(s)	Emma Riff	France	12+1 (219)	2:15.69 (279)	12:30.76 (550)	1048
3rd place, bronze medalist(s)	Michelle Gulyás	Hungary	12+1 (219)	2:11.16 (288)	12:44.55 (536)	1043
4	Gu Yewen	China	13+1 (227)	2:21.74 (267)	12:38.53 (542)	1036
5	Alice Rinaudo	Italy	16+0 (250)	2:17.57 (275)	13:10.00 (510)	1035
6	Laura Heredia	Spain	15+0 (242)	2:24.26 (262)	13:02.56 (518)	1022
7	Alida van der Merwe	South Africa	12+1 (219)	2:18.05 (274)	12:59.20 (521)	1014
8	Annabel Denton	Great Britain	14+0 (234)	2:20.85 (269)	13:21.27 (499)	1002
9	Anna Jurt	Switzerland	11+0 (210)	2:34.81 (241)	12:37.56 (543)	994
10	Martina Armanazqui	Argentina	13+1 (227)	2:18.78 (273)	13:35.09 (485)	985
11	Melissa Mireles	Mexico	11+0 (210)	2:32.75 (245)	12:53.74 (527)	982
12	Katsiaryna Etsina	Belarus	10+3 (205)	2:20.20 (270)	13:16.16 (504)	979
13	Elzbieta Adomaitytė	Lithuania	11+0 (210)	2:30.65 (249)	13:01.40 (519)	978
14	Zornitsa Stoilova	Bulgaria	10+0 (202)	2:25.46 (260)	13:20.26 (500)	962
15	Viktoriia Novikova	Russia	6+0 (170)	2:27.25 (256)	12:49.10 (531)	957
16	Maria Iêda Guimarães	Brazil	10+0 (202)	2:28.67 (253)	13:25.45 (495)	950
17	Chen Yu-hsuan	Chinese Taipei	8+4 (190)	2:50.63 (209)	12:36.89 (544)	943
18	Ekaterina Tareva	Kyrgyzstan	11+1 (211)	2:17.43 (276)	14:12.38 (448)	935
19	Yaren Nur Polat	Turkey	5+1 (163)	2:24.83 (261)	13:16.44 (504)	928
20	Agnieszka Wysokińska	Poland	9+0 (194)	2:28.95 (253)	13:50.35 (470)	917
21	Sofya Prizhennikova	Kazakhstan	14+3 (237)	2:26.88 (257)	14:46.12 (414)	908
22	Nikita Mawhirt	Australia	14+1 (235)	2:27.92 (255)	14:48.82 (412)	902
23	Hinano Shigehara	Japan	11+2 (212)	2:28.21 (254)	14:33.08 (427)	893
24	Ana Aragón	Guatemala	6+1 (171)	2:27.78 (255)	14:12.56 (448)	874
