= Emma Riff =

French modern pentathlete

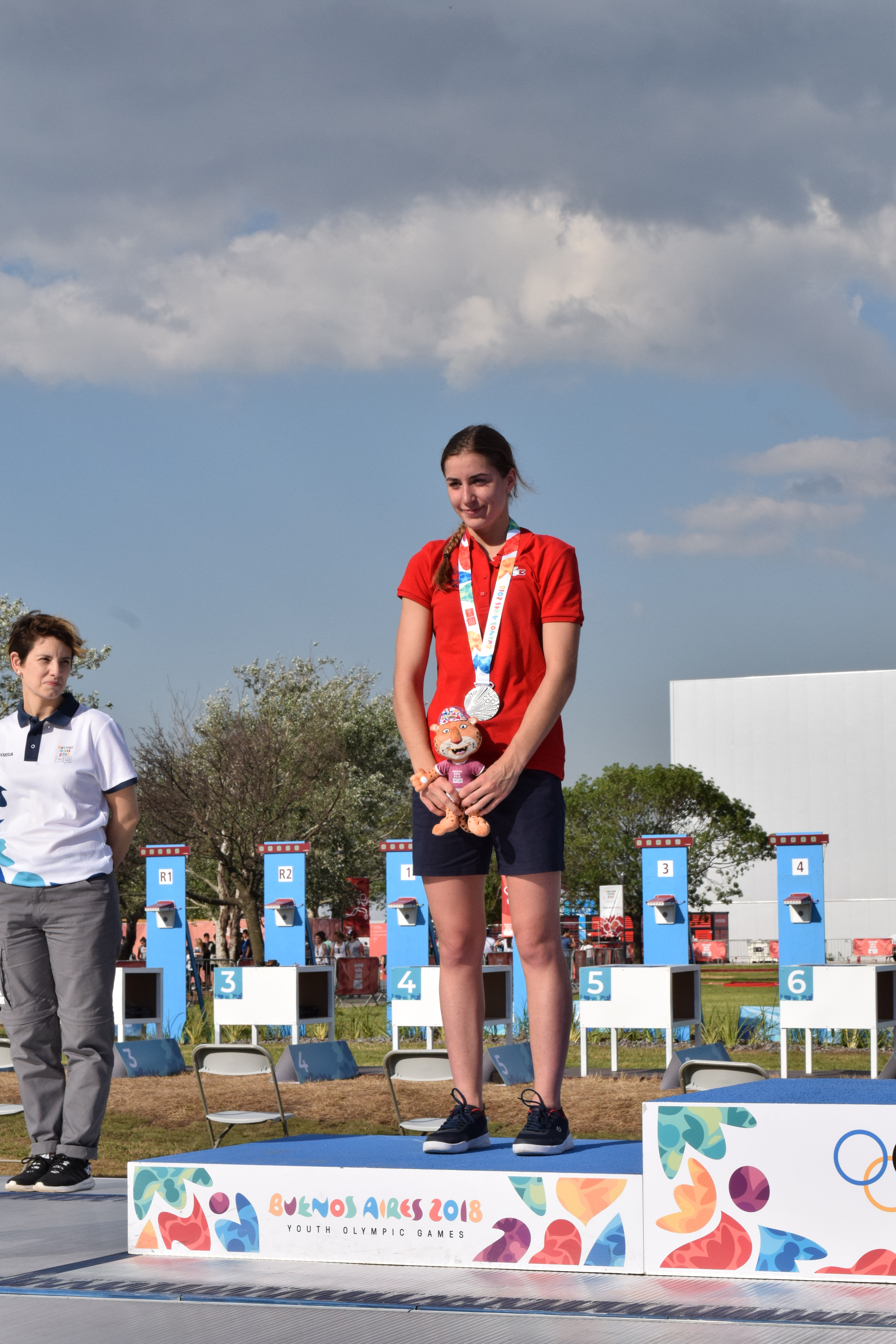
- Riff at the 2018 Summer Youth Olympics

Personal information
- Nationality: French
- Born: 14 December 2000 (age 25)

Sport
- Country: France
- Sport: Modern pentathlon
Medal record
Summer Youth Olympics
Silver medal – second place	2018 Buenos Aires	Individual
World Championships
Bronze medal – third place	2018 Mexico City	Mixed relay

Emma Riff (born 14 December 2000) is a French modern pentathlete.

She participated at the 2018 World Modern Pentathlon Championships, winning a medal.
