= Ieva Serapinaitė =

Lithuanian modern pentathlete (born 1995)

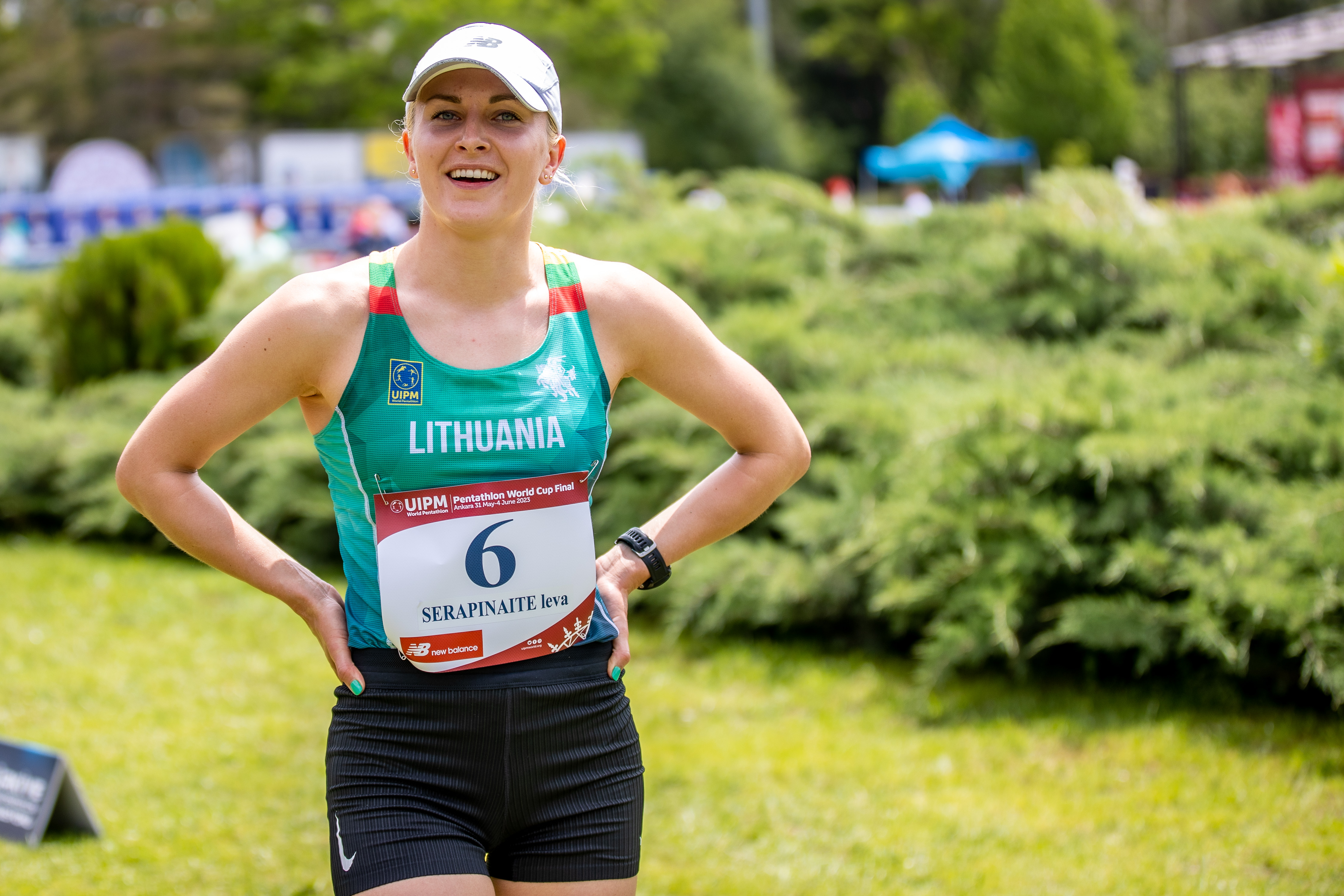
- 2023

Personal information
- Born: 4 February 1995 (age 31)
- Height: 175 cm (5 ft 9 in)
- Weight: 62 kg (137 lb)

Sport
- Sport: Modern pentathlon
- Coached by: Artūras Kalininas (until 2022) Lukas Kontrimavičius (since 2022)
Medal record
Representing Lithuania
World Championships
Silver medal – second place	2015 Berlin	Relay
European Games
Silver medal – second place	2023 Kraków-Małopolska	Team
European Championships
Gold medal – first place	2021 Nizhny Novgorod	Individual
Gold medal – first place	2022 Székesfehérvár	Relay
Silver medal – second place	2021 Nizhny Novgorod	Mixed relay
Silver medal – second place	2023 Kraków	Team
Bronze medal – third place	2019 Bath	Team
Bronze medal – third place	2022 Székesfehérvár	Team

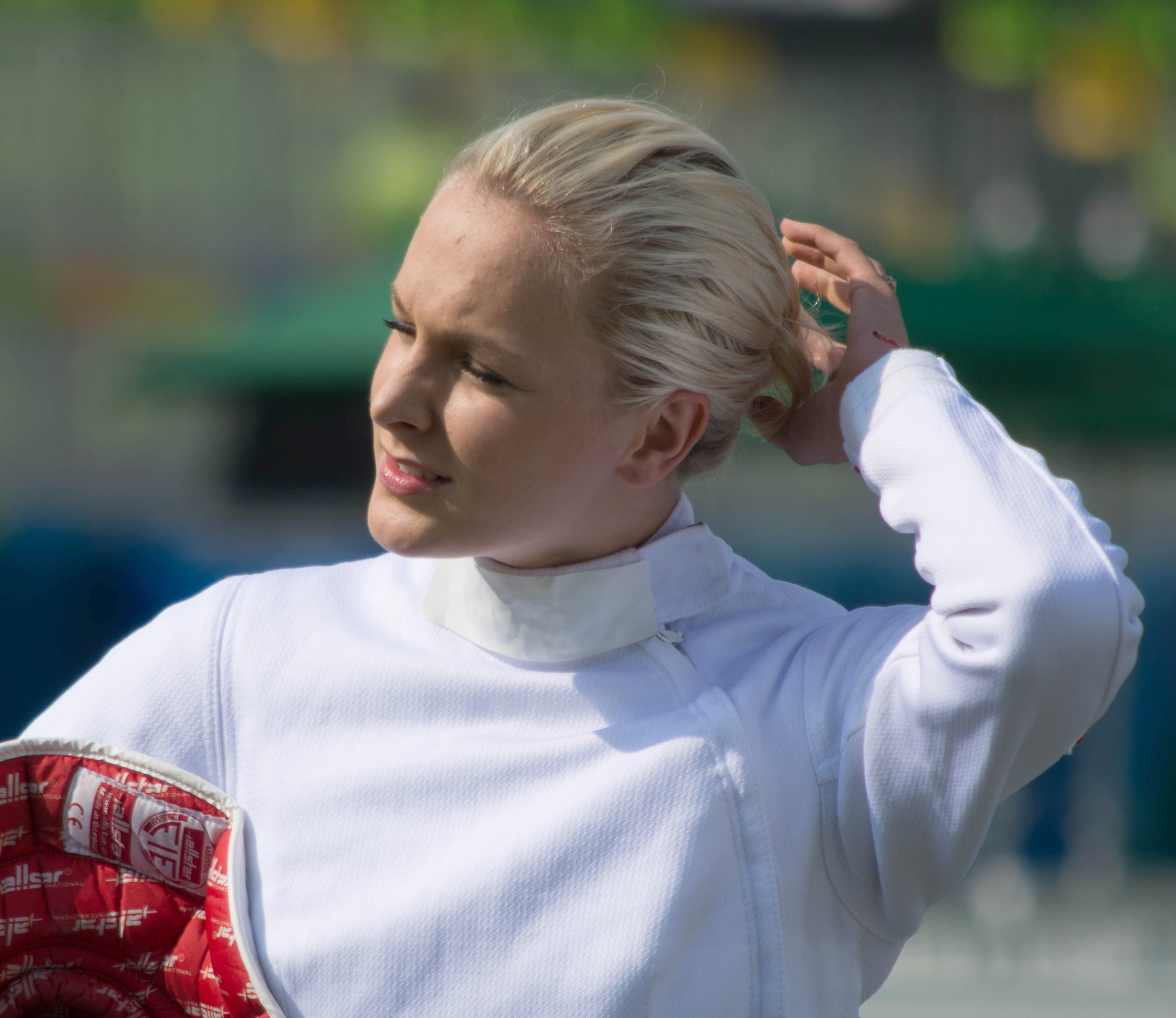
At the 2016 Olympics

Ieva Serapinaitė (born 4 February 1995) is a Lithuanian modern pentathlete. She began competing in 2009 and won the World Youth Championships title in 2012 and 2013. As a senior, she won a silver medal in the team relay at the 2015 World Championships and placed 29th at the 2016 Rio Olympics.
