= Valeriya Permykina =

Ukrainian modern pentathlete (born 1993)

Personal information
- Nationality: Ukrainian
- Born: 21 September 1993 (age 32)
- Height: 168 cm (5 ft 6 in)
- Weight: 53 kg (117 lb)

Sport
- Country: Ukraine
- Sport: Modern pentathlon
- Coached by: Volodymyr Potrebenko, Yuriy Tymoshchenko, Dmytro Kirpulyanskyy
Medal record
Representing Ukraine

Valeriya Permykina (Ukrainian: Валерія Пермикіна; born 21 September 1993) is a Ukrainian modern pentathlete. She competed at the 2024 Summer Olympics where she finished 11th in semifinal B and did not qualify for the final rounds. She also competed at the 2023 European Games where she reached semifinals but failed to qualify for the final rounds.

Permykina studied at the National University of Ukraine on Physical Education and Sport. She graduated from Lviv Sports College.
