= Élodie Clouvel =

French modern pentathlete (born 1989)

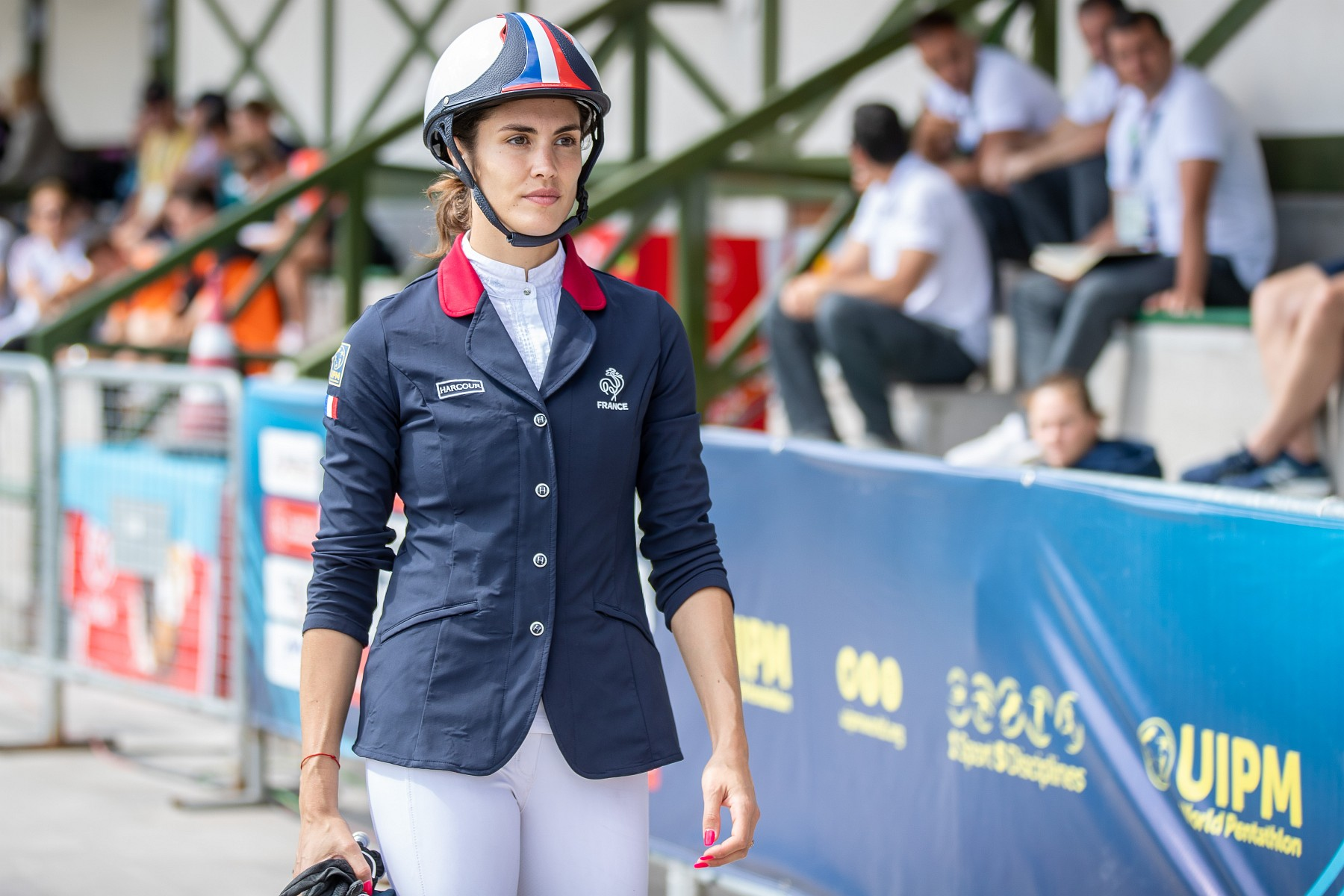

Personal information
- Nationality: French
- Born: 14 January 1989 (age 37) Saint-Priest-en-Jarez, Loire, France
- Height: 1.82 m (6 ft 0 in)
- Weight: 66 kg (146 lb)

Sport
- Country: France
- Sport: Modern pentathlon
Medal record
Women's modern pentathlon
Representing France
Olympic Games
Silver medal – second place	2016 Rio de Janeiro	Individual
Silver medal – second place	2024 Paris	Individual
World Championships
Gold medal – first place	2013 Kaoshiung	Mixed
Silver medal – second place	2010 Chengdu	Relay
Silver medal – second place	2016 Moscow	Individual
Silver medal – second place	2018 Mexico City	Team
Silver medal – second place	2019 Budapest	Mixed
Silver medal – second place	2021 Cairo	Individual
European Championships
Silver medal – second place	2015 Bath	Individual
Military World Games
Gold medal – first place	2019 Wuhan	Individual

Élodie Clouvel ([e.lɔ.di klu.vɛl]; born 14 January 1989) is a French modern pentathlete. At the 2012 Summer Olympics, she competed finishing in 31st place which also marked her maiden appearance at the Summer Olympics. She won the silver medal in the event at the 2016 Olympic Games as well as the 2024 Olympic Games. She is also currently serving as a second lieutenant in the National Gendarmerie. Her father Pascal Clouvel was a middle and long-distance runner, while her mother Annick Clouvel was also a long-distance runner.

She also took part in the 2019 Military World Games in Wuhan, and claimed a gold medal in the women's modern pentathlon individual event. After returning from the Military World Games in October, she and her partner Valentin Belaud said they both were infected with COVID-19 after falling ill with unusual symptoms; however, no testing to confirm this was made public.
