= Yuan Xin =

Western Wei prince

- 元欣

Grand Chancellor (大丞相)
- In office 554–?
- Monarch: Emperor Gong of Western Wei

Personal details
- Born: Unknown Luoyang, Henan
- Died: Unknown Xi'an, Shaanxi
- Relations: Emperor Xianwen of Northern Wei (grandfather); Emperor Jiemin of Northern Wei (brother)
- Children: Yuan Xiaozun
- Parent: Yuan Yu (father)
- Courtesy name: Qingle (慶樂)
- Peerage: Prince of Guangling (廣陵王)
- Posthumous name: Rong (容)

Yuan Xin (fl. 6th century), courtesy name Qingle, was a general and official of the Northern Wei and Western Wei during the Northern and Southern dynasties period. He was the brother of Emperor Jiemin of Northern Wei and was a high-ranking official from the imperial Yuan clan. After Emperor Xiaowu's flight to Chang'an in 534, Yuan Xin surrendered to Yuwen Tai and the Western Wei, where he eventually became one of the Eight Zhuguo (八柱國). Unlike the other Zhuguo, Yuan Xin was the only member to not hold military command; his role was mostly nominal, and modern historian, Mao Hanguang states that his inclusion was only to appease the Yuan clan, who still possessed considerable influence under the Western Wei.

== Life ==
Yuan Xin was the grandson of Emperor Xianwen of Northern Wei and the son of the Prince of Guangling, Yuan Yu (元羽). He was the eldest son of Yuan Yu, although for reasons not stated, after Yu's death, his peerage was passed down to Xin's younger brother, Yuan Gong. Yuan Xin was described as a man of rough character who was fond of dogs and hawks. In the early years of Emperor Xiaoming, he served as Communications Cavalier Regular Attendant and North General of the Household. Afterwards, he was transferred to Champion General and Inspector of Jing province and then General Who Attacks Bandits and Inspector of Qi province. He was well-liked in Jing and Qi, and was later assigned to General Who Attacks the East and Minister of Husbandry.

In 527, Liu Cangsheng (劉蒼生), Liu Jun (劉鈞), Fang Xu (房須) and others from Pingyuan Commandery in Qi province rebelled, captured the commandery and repeatedly defeated the provincial army. Yuan Xin wanted to recruit Pingyuan native, Fang Shida (房士達) as a general to quell the rebellion, but Fang firmly declined on the grounds of etiquette, as he was in the middle of overseeing his mourning period for his late father. Yuan then ordered a friend of Fang, Feng Yuanxing (馮元興) to say to him, "The entire region is now in rebellion, and the rebels are growing stronger by the day. If, by some chance, that the province were to fall, then how will your family survive? Given the dire situation at hand, how can one possibly think of upholding etiquette?" Fang had no choice but to accept the commission, leading more than 2,000 people from the provincial capital to attack the rebels in the east and west, eventually defeating them.

In 528, Yuan Xin was paired with the Right Supervisor of the Masters of Writing, Yuan Luo in inspecting the various regions, promoting and demoting officials and reporting their works once they were finished. At the time, the official, Gao Qianyong (高乾邕), and his brothers led refugees to raise an army at Pingyuan Commandery. Gao repeatedly defeated the Wei armies sent to defeat him. Emperor Xiaozhuang eventually sent Yuan Xin to mediate with Gao, and only then did he surrender. Later in the year, Yuan was enfeoffed the Prince of Pei Commandery.

In 529, the Prince of Beihai, Yuan Hao, with the help of the Liang general, Chen Qingzhi captured the capital, Luoyang from Emperor Xiaozhuang, prompting many of the commanderies and provinces south of the Yellow River to submit to him. Yuan Qin brought his officials to discuss the issue and told them, "The Prince of Beihai and the Prince of Changle (Emperor Xiaozhuang) are both cousins, so the ancestral lineage remains the same. I intend to accept Yuan Hao's pardon, what say you?" Everyone at the meeting was surprised, and one of them, Cui Guangshao loudly objected, "Yuan Hao is a pawn of Liang and had raised an army to uproot our forces, cut our resources and aid the enemy. Such a traitorous minister and troublemaker is almost unheard of in history. This is not simply a matter for the family of the princes, but something we must all vehemently oppose. We, as officials graced by the imperial court, dare not obey him." The rest of Yuan Xin's staff all agreed with Cui, so when Yuan Hao's envoy arrived, Yuan Xin had the envoy executed.

In 531, after the Erzhu clan installed Yuan Gong to the throne as Emperor Jiemin, Yuan Xin was appointed the Grand Tutor and Governor of Si province, while his peerage was changed to Prince of Huaiyang. In 532, the Erzhu clan was defeated by the general, Gao Huan, who deposed Yuan Gong and replaced him with Emperor Xiaowu. Yuan Xin was promoted to Grand Preceptor while his fief was reverted to the Prince of Pei. However, a few days after the abdication, Emperor Xiaowu had the deposed Yuan Gong poisoned, so later in the year, Yuan Xin inherited his peerage as the Prince of Guangling. In 533, Yuan Xin was assigned to Grand Marshal and Palace Attendant as well as granted privilege of Separate Office. In 534, Emperor Xiaowu made him Grand Chief Controller of the Left Army.

Later in 534, as mounting tension broke into all out war with Gao Huan, Emperor Xiaowu abandoned Luoyang and fled west to join the general, Yuwen Tai at Chang'an. Yuan Xin sought refuge with Li Yansun (李延孫), a Chief Controller under Yuwen Tai's Western Wei who safely escorted him all the way to Chang'an. Among the Wei princes under Yuwen Tai, Yuan Xin was treated with the highest-level of respect, even more than the Prince of Guangping, Yuan Zan (元讚), who was a favoured cousin of Emperor Xiaowu.

In 535, Yuan Xin was appointed Grand Tutor and Manager of the Affairs of the Masters of Writing. In 537, he was made Grand Chancellor while also as a Palace Attendant with the Prince of Fufeng, Yuan Fu and Nian Xian. He also served Grand Chief Controller of the Central Army. In 548, he was once again recommended to the position of Grand Tutor. However, Emperor Wen of Western Wei told Yuan Xin, "You have been the Grand Tutor three times and the Grand Preceptor twice by now. Such an example has never been heard of in history." Hearing his comments, Yuan Xin declined the position.

Yuan Xin was later made into a Zhuguo and appointed the Minister of Works. Following Emperor Gong's ascension in 554, he was promoted to Grand Chancellor. He died in an unknown year, and was given the posthumous name of "Rong". Throughout his career in the Western Wei, Yuan Xin never commanded an army and mostly stayed in the imperial palace. He indulged in managing business and cultivated various trees in his garden, with many of capital's famous fruits coming from his garden. However, his subordinates and the people he recommended were all of bad character and despised by everyone.

== Sources ==
- Book of Wei
- History of the Northern Dynasties
