= Adam Grzegorzewski =

Polish equestrian

Personal information
- Born: 29 May 1998 (age 28) Łódź, Poland

Sport
- Country: Poland
- Sport: Equestrian
- Event: Show jumping

Adam Grzegorzewski (born 29 May 1998 in Łódź, Poland) is a Polish equestrian. Grzegorzewski has been selected by the Polish Equestrian Federation to represent the Polish show-jumping team at the 2024 Summer Olympics in Paris.
