= Wiktoria Knap =

Polish equestrian (born 1999)

Personal information
- Born: 12 June 1999 (age 27) Zielona Góra, Poland

Sport
- Country: Poland
- Sport: Equestrian
- Event: Eventing

Wiktoria Knap (born 12 June 1999 in Zielona Góra, Poland) is a Polish equestrian.

== Career ==
Knap represented the Polish eventing team at the 2024 Summer Olympics in Paris.

She was initially reserve member, but stepped in at the show-jumping course. The Olympic Games was her first major championship.
