= Maksymilian Wechta =

Polish equestrian

Personal information
- Born: 18 May 1993 (age 33) Poznań, Poland

Sport
- Country: Poland
- Sport: Equestrian
- Event: Show jumping

Maksymilian Wechta (born 18 May 1993) is a Polish equestrian. Wechta competed at the 2022 FEI World Championships representing the Polish show-jumping team. He has been selected by the Polish Equestrian Federation to represent the Polish show-jumping team at the 2024 Summer Olympics in Paris.
