= Alice Sotero =

Italian modern pentathlete (born 1991)

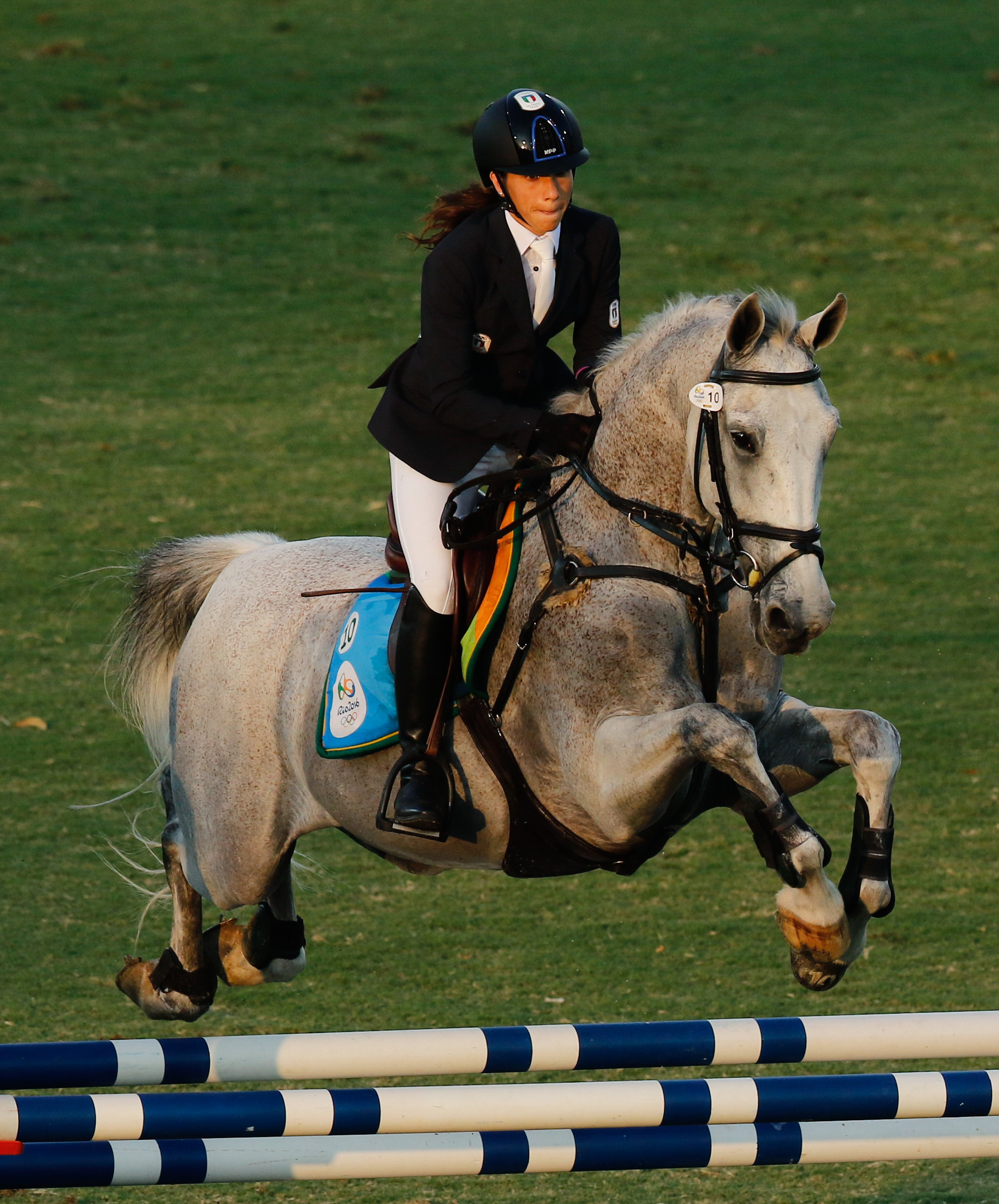
- Sotero at the 2016 Olympics

Personal information
- Born: 28 May 1991 (age 35) Asti, Italy
- Height: 166 cm (5 ft 5 in)
- Weight: 53 kg (117 lb)

Sport
- Country: Italy
- Sport: Modern pentathlon
- Club: Fiamme Azzurre
Medal record
Women's modern pentathlon
Representing Italy
World Championships
Gold medal – first place	2023 Bath	Team
Silver medal – second place	2023 Bath	Individual
European Games
Gold medal – first place	2023 Kraków-Małopolska	Individual
European Championships
Gold medal – first place	2017 Minsk	Team
Gold medal – first place	2023 Kraków	Individual
Bronze medal – third place	2014 Székesfehérvár	Team
Bronze medal – third place	2015 Bath	Team

Alice Sotero (born 28 May 1991) is an Italian modern pentathlete.

== Career ==
She represented Italy at the 2016 Summer Olympics, 2020 Summer Olympics, and the 2023 European Games.

== Achievements ==
Year	Competition	Venue	Rank	Event	Time	Notes
2021	Olympic Games	(Japan) Tokyo	4th	Individual	1363 pts	
