= Gintarė Aleksandravičė =

Lithuanian modern pentathlete (born 1992)

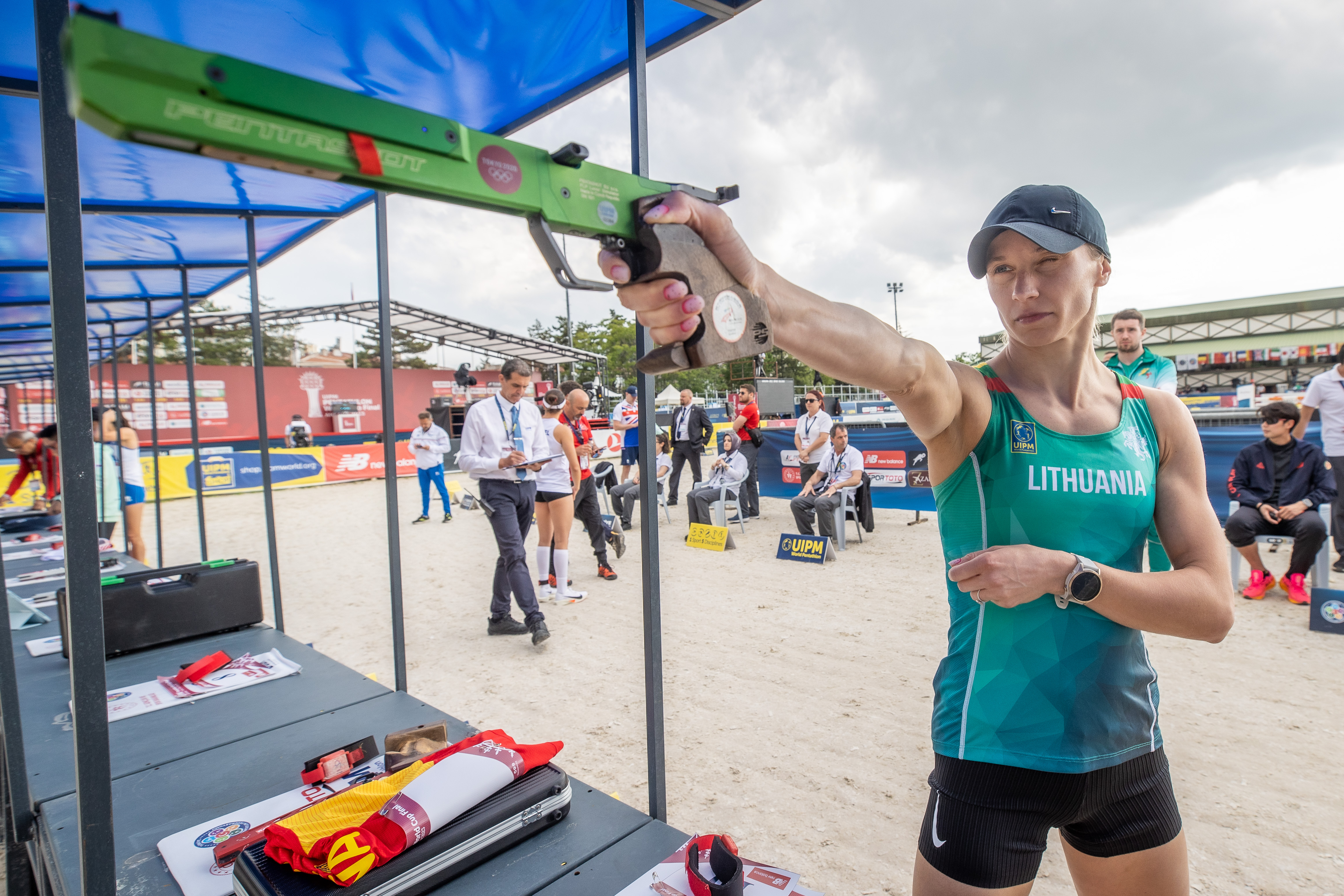
- 2023

Personal information
- Born: Gintaré Venčkauskaitė; 4 November 1992 (age 33) Klaipėda
- Height: 1.70 m (5 ft 7 in)
- Weight: 54 kg (119 lb)

Sport
- Country: Lithuania
- Sport: Modern Pentathlon
- Coached by: Henrikas Eismontas

Achievements and titles
- National finals: 1 (2011)
- Highest world ranking: 6th
Medal record
Women's modern pentathlon
Representing Lithuania
European Games
Silver medal – second place	2023 Kraków-Małopolska	Team
European Championships
Gold medal – first place	2016 Sofia	Team
Silver medal – second place	2023 Kraków	Team
Bronze medal – third place	2019 Bath	Team
- Updated on 4 August 2016

Gintarė Aleksandravičė (born 4 November 1992 in Klaipėda) is a Lithuanian modern pentathlete.

== Biography ==
She competed in 2010 Youth Olympics and reached 6th place. In 2011 World Championships she was 37th, while winning the national championship. Venčkauskaitė had her first Olympic Games participation in 2012, finishing 12th.
