= Lucie Hlaváčková =

Czech modern pentathlete (born 2005)

Personal information
- Born: 30 September 2005 (age 20) Prague, Czech Republic

Sport
- Country: Czech Republic
- Sport: Modern pentathlon
Medal record
Women's modern pentathlon
Representing Czech Republic
World Championships
| Bronze medal – third place | 2023 Bath | Mixed relay |
European Championships
| Silver medal – second place | 2025 Madrid | Relay |

Lucie Hlaváčková (born 30 September 2005) is a Czech modern pentathlete.

== Life ==
Hlaváčková was born on 30 September 2005 in Prague.

== Career ==
She started in gymnastics before transitioning to modern pentathlon. She is part of David Svoboda's training group at Dukla Prague and is trained in fencing by Jiří Adam. She became under-19 European champion in 2022, and was a silver medalist at the U24 European Championship.

She won a bronze medal in the mixed relay at the 2023 World Modern Pentathlon Championships in Bath, England.

She finished in the fourth place at the Modern Pentathlete World Cup in Ankara in April 2024. She qualified for the final of the 2024 European Modern Pentathlon Championships in July 2024.

She competed at the 2024 Summer Olympics in Paris, qualifying the final.
