= Natalia Dominiak =

Polish modern pentathlete

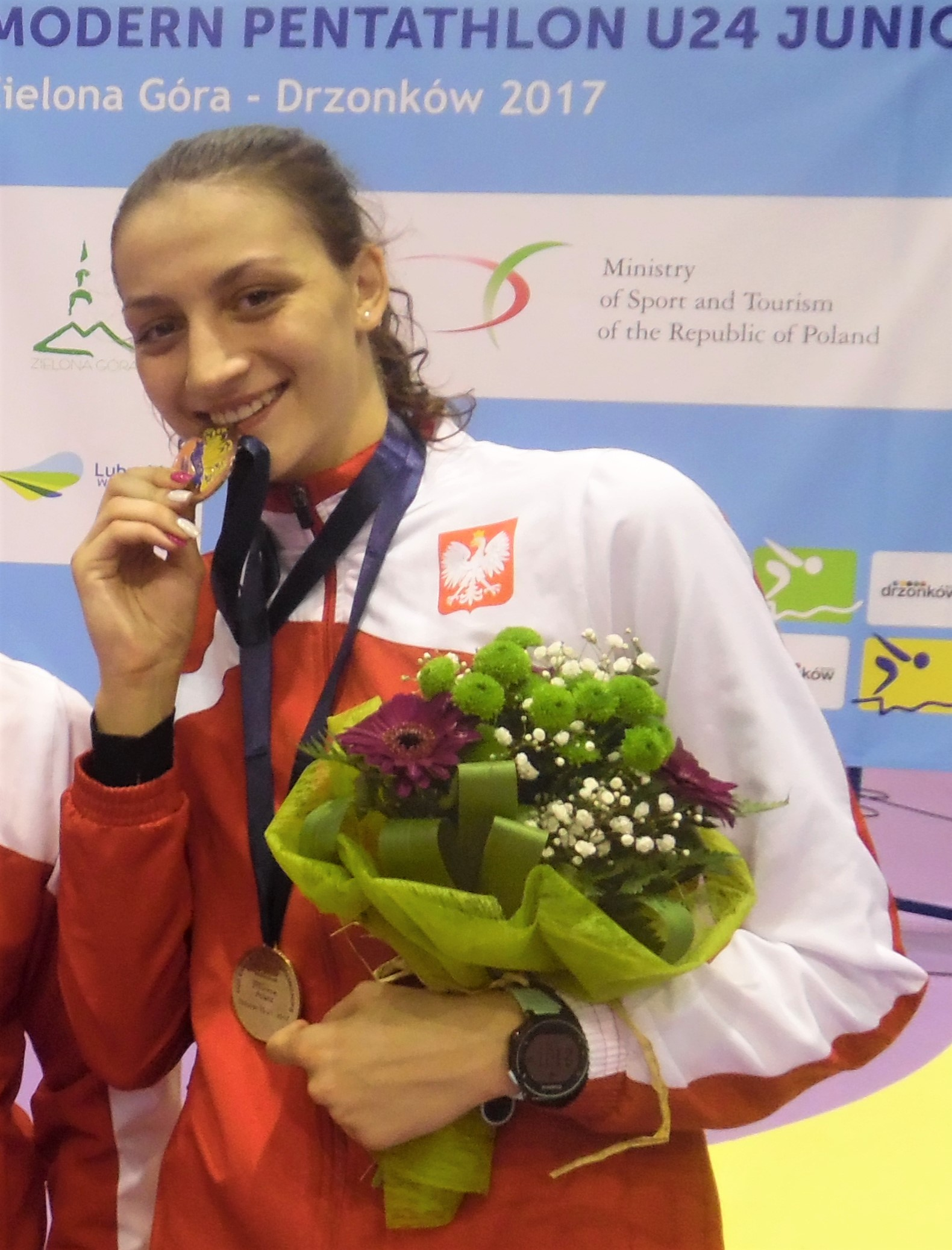

Personal information
- Born: 30 January 1998 (age 28)

Sport
- Club: ZKS Drzonków

Natalia Dominiak (born 30 January 1998) is a Polish modern pentathlete and U24 European Champion (2017).

== Sports career ==
She is a national team member in modern pentathlon, representing the club ZKS Drzonków. Her first major success was winning the individual silver medal at the Junior European Championships in Prague in 2015. The following year, she made her senior World Cup debut. During the Youth European Championships in Drzonków, she won a bronze medal in the mixed relay with Daniel Ławrynowicz.

In 2017, she stood on the individual podium of the Polish Modern Pentathlon Championships for the first time. That same year, at the inaugural U24 European Championships in Drzonków, she won the individual competition and, with Marta Kobecka and Dominika Karolak, took second place in the team event. The following year at the same event, she won a bronze medal with Daniel Ławrynowicz, and in 2019, she won silver with Kamil Kasperczak.

She concluded the 2019 season by competing in the 2019 Military World Games in Wuhan. There, she finished 21st individually and won a bronze medal in the team event with Oktawia Nowacka and Anna Maliszewska.

In 2020, she advanced to the final of a World Cup event for the first time in Cairo, finishing in 21st place.

== Trivia ==
- She is nicknamed "Żyrafa" ("Giraffe" in English) by her friends.

== Bibliography ==
- Results at UIPM
