= Maria Iêda Guimarães =

Brazilian modern pentathlete

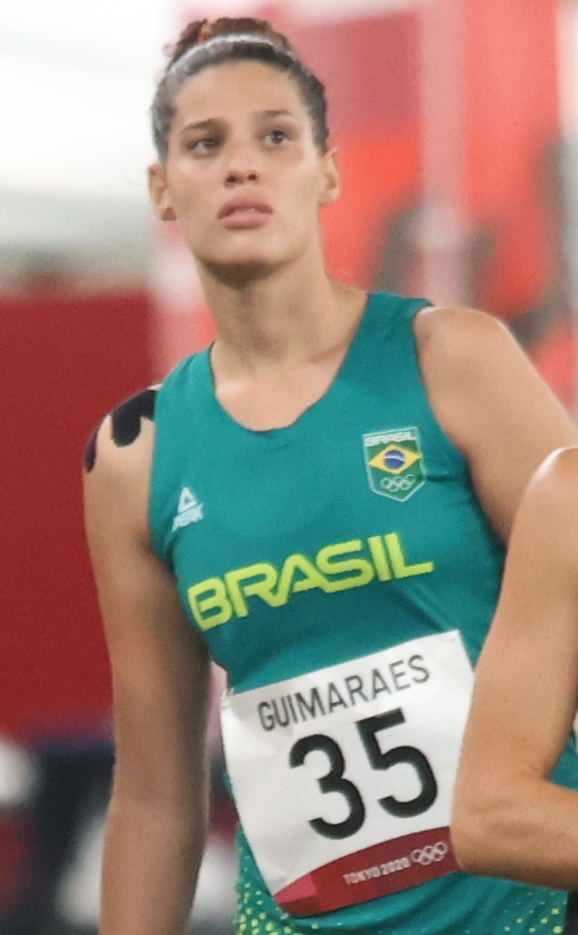
- Guimarães at the 2020 Summer Olympics

Personal information
- Born: 30 August 2000 (age 25) Rio de Janeiro, Brazil

Sport
- Sport: Modern pentathlon

Maria Iêda Guimarães (born 30 August 2000) is a Brazilian modern pentathlete. She competed in the women's event at the 2020 Summer Olympics.
