= Laura Heredia =

Spanish modern pentathlete (born 2000)

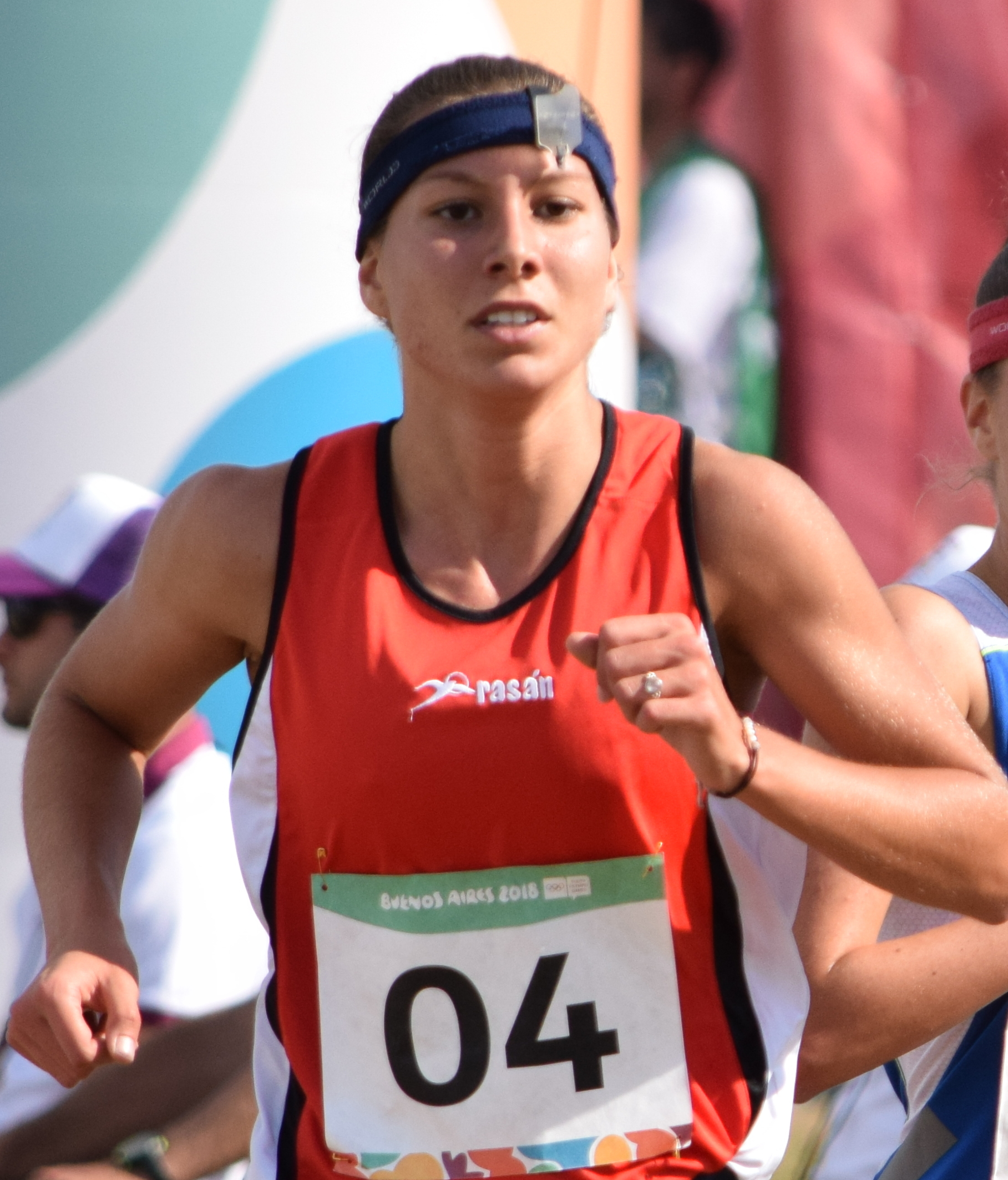
- Heredia in 2018

Personal information
- Full name: Laura Heredia Vives
- Born: 31 January 2000 (age 26) Barcelona, Spain

Sport
- Country: Spain
- Sport: Modern pentathlon
Medal record
Women's modern pentathlon
Representing Spain
European Games
Silver medal – second place	2023 Kraków-Małopolska	Individual
European Championships
Silver medal – second place	2023 Kraków	Individual

Laura Heredia Vives(born 31 January 2000) is a Spanish modern pentathlete. She was a silver medalist at the 2023 European Games and competed at the 2024 Paris Olympics.

== Career ==
She became the European under-24 champion in 2022. That year, she finished ninth at the World Championships. Her 2023 results included a seventh place at the World Cup in Cairo and fourth place at the Ankara World Cup event. At the 2023 European Games in Krakow, she won a silver medal in the individual event.

She became the first Spanish woman to qualify for the modern pentathlon at the Olympic Games. She competed at the 2024 Summer Olympics in Paris.

== Personal life ==
From Barcelona, she has worked with biomechanics at Sant Cugat High Performance Centre to help with her sporting performances. Her brother Aleix Heredia is also a modern pentathlete.
