= Anna Maliszewska =

Polish modern pentathlete

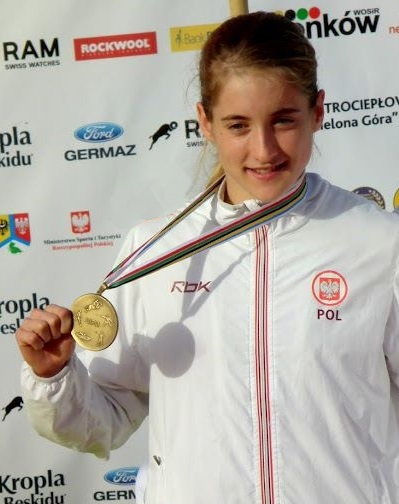

Personal information
- Nationality: Polish
- Born: 4 July 1993 (age 32) Zielona Góra

Sport
- Sport: Modern pentathlon
Medal record
Women's modern pentathlon
Representing Poland
World Championships
Gold medal – first place	2014 Warsaw	Team

Anna Maliszewska (born 4 July 1993) is a Polish modern pentathlete. She was born in the west Polish town of Zielona Góra. Maliszewska won the gold medal in the team event at the 2015 World Modern Pentathlon Championships. She qualified for 2016 Summer Olympics in Rio.
