= Modern pentathlon at the 2026 Asian Games =

- Venue: Anjō Sports Park
- Dates: 16–20 September 2026
- Competitors: 69 from 18 nations

Modern pentathlon at the 2026 Asian Games was held between 16 and 20 September at Anjō Sports Park.

For the first time in the Asian Games, obstacle racing is featured, replacing show jumping.

== Schedule ==
The schedule was as follows:

| R | Ranking round | S | Semifinals | F | Final |

| Event↓/Date → | 16th Wed | 17th Thu | 18th Fri | 19th Sat | 20th Sun |
|---|---|---|---|---|---|
| Men's individual | R | | S | | F |
| Women's individual | R | S | | | F |
| Men's team | | | | | F |
| Women's team | | | | | F |

== Medal summary ==
=== Medal table ===
* Host nation (Japan)

| Rank | Nation | Gold | Silver | Bronze | Total |
|---|---|---|---|---|---|
| 1 | China | 2 | 2 | 1 | 5 |
| 1 | South Korea | 2 | 2 | 1 | 5 |
| 3 | Japan* | 0 | 0 | 1 | 1 |
| 3 | Kazakhstan | 0 | 0 | 1 | 1 |
| Totals (4 entries) | | 4 | 4 | 4 | 12 |

=== Medalists ===
| Event | Gold | Silver | Bronze |
|---|---|---|---|
| Men's individual | Li Liuchang; China | Jun Woong-tae; South Korea | Lee Jong-hyeon; South Korea |
| Men's team | South Korea; Jun Woong-tae; Lee Jong-hyeon; Seo Chang-wan | China; Li Liuchang; Luo Shuai; Ma Yuang | Kazakhstan; Temirlan Abdraimov; Tikhon Varyokhin; Lev Chuvashov |
| Women's individual | Seong Seung-min; South Korea | Zhang Mingyu; China | Wu Xiyao; China |
| Women's team | China; Zhang Mingyu; Wu Xiyao; Meng Xin | South Korea; Seong Seung-min; Kim Un-ju; Shin Su-min | Japan; Misaki Uchida; Ayumu Saito; Yuho Yano |

== Participating nations ==
- China (8)
- Hong Kong (2)
- Indonesia (5)
- Japan (8)
- Kazakhstan (7)
- Kuwait (3)
- Kyrgyzstan (3)
- Lebanon (1)
- Malaysia (2)
- Mongolia (1)
- Palestine (2)
- Philippines (7)
- Singapore (1)
- South Korea (8)
- Sri Lanka (2)
- Thailand (5)
- United Arab Emirates (1)
- Uzbekistan (3)
