= Modern pentathlon at the 2022 Asian Games – Men's team =

Modern pentathlon event

Men's team at the 2022 Asian Games
- Venue: Fuyang Yinhu Sports Centre
- Date: 20–24 September 2023
- Competitors: 23 from 6 nations

Medalists
gold medal	South Korea; Jun Woong-tae, Jung Jin-hwa, Lee Ji-hun
silver medal	China; Chen Yan, Li Shuhuan, Zhang Linbin
bronze medal	Japan; Ryo Matsumoto, Taishu Sato, Kaoru Shinoki

The men's modern pentathlon competition at the 2022 Asian Games in Hangzhou was held from 20 to 24 September 2023.

At the end of the individual competition, results for the 3 best members of each team determined the results of the team classification. Teams with more athletes in the final were ranked higher.

== Schedule ==
All times are China Standard Time (UTC+08:00)

Date	Time	Event
Wednesday, 20 September 2023	14:30	Fencing ranking round
Friday, 22 September 2023	10:00	Semifinal A fencing bonus round
Friday, 22 September 2023	10:35	Semifinal A swimming
Friday, 22 September 2023	11:15	Semifinal A laser-run
Friday, 22 September 2023	16:00	Semifinal B fencing bonus round
Friday, 22 September 2023	16:35	Semifinal B swimming
Friday, 22 September 2023	17:15	Semifinal B laser-run
Sunday, 24 September 2023	15:00	Final riding
Sunday, 24 September 2023	15:50	Final fencing bonus round
Sunday, 24 September 2023	16:20	Final swimming
Sunday, 24 September 2023	17:00	Final laser-run

== Results ==
Rank	Team	Ride	Fence	Swim	L-run	Total	F
1st place, gold medalist(s)	South Korea (KOR)	893	716	923	1945	4477	3
	Jun Woong-tae	293	233	312	670	1508	
	Jung Jin-hwa	300	215	309	653	1477	
	Lee Ji-hun	300	268	302	622	1492	
	Seo Chang-wan	~~231~~	~~229~~	~~306~~	~~658~~	~~1424~~	
2nd place, silver medalist(s)	China (CHN)	886	709	900	1902	4397	3
	Chen Yan	300	231	307	602	1440	
	Li Shuhuan	293	243	295	653	1484	
	Luo Shuai	~~0~~	~~228~~	~~297~~	~~678~~	~~1203~~	
	Zhang Linbin	293	235	298	647	1473	
3rd place, bronze medalist(s)	Japan (JPN)	851	602	890	1907	4250	3
	Ryo Matsumoto	293	187	283	653	1416	
	Taishu Sato	279	238	301	639	1457	
	Kaoru Shinoki	279	177	306	615	1377	
4	Kazakhstan (KAZ)	559	695	874	1805	3933	3
	Temirlan Abdraimov	~~0~~	~~222~~	~~283~~	~~642~~	~~1147~~	
	Georgiy Boroda-Dudochkin	290	203	298	620	1411	
	Pavel Ilyashenko	0	250	295	638	1183	
	Kirill Stadnik	269	242	281	547	1339	
5	Kyrgyzstan (KGZ)	269	612	849	1742	3472	2
	Atai Erkinbekov	0	187	273	630	1090	
	Radion Khripchenko	269	215	273	531	1288	
	Vasilii Lukianov		210	303	581	1094	SF
	Ilia Miagkikh		~~194~~	~~272~~	~~572~~	~~1038~~	~~SF~~
6	Thailand (THA)	286	594	868	1751	3499	1
	Natthaphon Kesornphrom		~~166~~	~~284~~	~~596~~	~~1046~~	~~SF~~
	Chatcha Srikamol		194	255	614	1063	SF
	Phurit Yohuang	286	209	311	578	1384	
	Phurithut Yohuang		191	302	559	1052	SF
