= Modern pentathlon at the 2022 Asian Games =

- Venue: Fuyang Yinhu Sports Centre
- Dates: 20–24 September 2023
- Competitors: 48 from 11 nations

The modern pentathlon at the 2022 Asian Games was held at the Fuyang Yinhu Sports Centre, Hangzhou, China from 20 to 24 September 2023.

Modern pentathlon contains five events; pistol shooting, épée fencing, 200-metre freestyle swimming, show jumping, and a 3.2-kilometre cross-country run.

The first three events (fencing, swimming, and show jumping) are scored on a points system. Those points will then be converted into a time handicap for the final combined event (pistol shooting and cross-country running), with the points leader starting first and each other competitor having a delayed start based on how many points behind the leader they are. This results in the finish order of the run will be the final ranking for the event.

== Schedule ==
| R | Ranking round | S | Semifinals | F | Final |

| Event↓/Date → | 20th Wed | 21st Thu | 22nd Fri | 23rd Sat | 24th Sun |
|---|---|---|---|---|---|
| Men's individual | R | | S | | F |
| Men's team | R | | S | | F |
| Women's individual | R | | | | F |
| Women's team | R | | | | F |

== Medalists ==
| Event | Gold | Silver | Bronze |
|---|---|---|---|
| Men's individual | Jun Woong-tae; South Korea | Lee Ji-hun; South Korea | Li Shuhuan; China |
| Men's team | South Korea; Jun Woong-tae; Jung Jin-hwa; Lee Ji-hun | China; Chen Yan; Li Shuhuan; Zhang Linbin | Japan; Ryo Matsumoto; Taishu Sato; Kaoru Shinoki |
| Women's individual | Zhang Mingyu; China | Kim Sun-woo; South Korea | Bian Yufei; China |
| Women's team | China; Bian Yufei; Zhang Mingyu; Zhong Xiuting | Japan; Hana Shibata; Misaki Uchida; Kanae Umemura | South Korea; Kim Se-hee; Kim Sun-woo; Seong Seung-min |

== Medal table ==
| Rank | Nation | Gold | Silver | Bronze | Total |
|---|---|---|---|---|---|
| 1 | South Korea (KOR) | 2 | 2 | 1 | 5 |
| 2 | China (CHN) | 2 | 1 | 2 | 5 |
| 3 | Japan (JPN) | 0 | 1 | 1 | 2 |
| Totals (3 entries) | | 4 | 4 | 4 | 12 |

== Participating nations ==
A total of 48 athletes from 11 nations competed in modern pentathlon at the 2022 Asian Games:

- China (8)
- India (1)
- Indonesia (2)
- Japan (6)
- Kazakhstan (8)
- Kyrgyzstan (5)
- Mongolia (1)
- Singapore (1)
- South Korea (8)
- Thailand (4)
- Uzbekistan (4)
