= Modern pentathlon at the 2026 Asian Games – Men's team =

Modern pentathlon event

Men's team at the 2026 Asian Games
- Venue: Anjō Sports Park
- Location: Anjō, Aichi Prefecture, Japan
- Date: 16–20 September 2026
- Competitors: 20 from 5 nations

Medalists
gold medal	South Korea; Jun Woong-tae, Lee Jong-hyeon, Seo Chang-wan
silver medal	China; Li Liuchang, Luo Shuai, Ma Yuang
bronze medal	Kazakhstan; Temirlan Abdraimov, Tikhon Varyokhin, Lev Chuvashov

The men's modern pentathlon competition at the 2026 Asian Games in Anjō, Aichi is held from 16 to 20 September 2026.

At the end of the individual competition, results for the 3 best members of each team determined the results of the team classification. Teams with more athletes in the final were ranked higher.

== Schedule ==
All times are Japan Standard Time (UTC+09:00)

Date	Time	Event
Wednesday, 16 September 2026	14:30	Fencing seeding round
Friday, 18 September 2026	10:00	Semifinal A Fencing direct elimination
Friday, 18 September 2026	10:20	Semifinal A Obstacle racing
Friday, 18 September 2026	10:40	Semifinal A Swimming
Friday, 18 September 2026	11:00	Semifinal A Laser-run
Friday, 18 September 2026	15:00	Semifinal B Fencing direct elimination
Friday, 18 September 2026	15:20	Semifinal B Obstacle racing
Friday, 18 September 2026	15:40	Semifinal B Swimming
Friday, 18 September 2026	16:00	Semifinal B Laser-run
Sunday, 20 September 2026	14:30	Final Fencing direct elimination
Sunday, 20 September 2026	14:50	Final Obstacle racing
Sunday, 20 September 2026	15:10	Final Swimming
Sunday, 20 September 2026	15:30	Final Laser-run

== Results ==
Rank	Team	Fencing	Obstacle	Swimming	Laser-run	Total	F
1st place, gold medalist(s)	South Korea (KOR)	670	1121	965	2023	4779	3
	Jun Woong-tae	218	366	324	687	1595	
	Lee Jong-hyeon	214	378	318	683	1593	
	Seo Chang-wan	238	377	323	653	1591	
	Kim Young-ha	~~226~~	~~368~~	~~334~~	~~611~~	~~1539~~	
2nd place, silver medalist(s)	China (CHN)	660	1133	965	2010	4768	3
	Li Liuchang	196	377	330	695	1598	
	Luo Shuai	228	373	311	680	1592	
	Ma Yuang	236	383	324	635	1578	
	Chen Bailiang	~~216~~	~~380~~	~~326~~	~~628~~	~~1550~~	
3rd place, bronze medalist(s)	Kazakhstan (KAZ)	684	1122	921	1910	4647	3
	Temirlan Abdraimov	250	366	293	655	1564	
	Tikhon Varyokhin	224	379	313	638	1554	
	Lev Chuvashov	210	377	315	627	1529	
	Kirill Stadnik	~~206~~	~~0~~	~~314~~	~~618~~	~~1138~~	
4	Japan (JPN)	656	1088	942	1911	4597	2
	Yousuke Tomita	212	361	320	668	1561	
	Taishu Sato	230	365	310	642	1547	
	Kaoru Shinoki	214	362	312	601	1489	SF
	Kazuaki Sekigawa	~~224~~	~~341~~	~~324~~	~~592~~	~~1481~~	SF
5	Philippines (PHI)	654	1085	805	1842	4386	2
	Samuel German	244	387	246	608	1485	
	Michael Ver Anton Comaling	198	320	290	600	1408	
	Gilbert Andrino	212	378	269	634	1493	SF
	Joseph Anthony Godbout	~~214~~	~~343~~	~~279~~	~~593~~	~~1429~~	SF
