= Modern pentathlon at the 2022 Asian Games – Men's individual =

Modern pentathlon event

Men's individual at the 2022 Asian Games
- Venue: Fuyang Yinhu Sports Centre
- Date: 20–24 September 2023
- Competitors: 29 from 11 nations

Medalists
gold medal	Jun Woong-tae	South Korea
silver medal	Lee Ji-hun	South Korea
bronze medal	Li Shuhuan	China

The men's individual modern pentathlon competition at the 2022 Asian Games in Hangzhou was held from 20 to 24 September 2023.

== Schedule ==
All times are China Standard Time (UTC+08:00)

Date	Time	Event
Wednesday, 20 September 2023	14:30	Fencing ranking round
Friday, 22 September 2023	10:00	Semifinal A fencing bonus round
Friday, 22 September 2023	10:35	Semifinal A swimming
Friday, 22 September 2023	11:15	Semifinal A laser-run
Friday, 22 September 2023	16:00	Semifinal B fencing bonus round
Friday, 22 September 2023	16:35	Semifinal B swimming
Friday, 22 September 2023	17:15	Semifinal B laser-run
Sunday, 24 September 2023	15:00	Final riding
Sunday, 24 September 2023	15:50	Final fencing bonus round
Sunday, 24 September 2023	16:20	Final swimming
Sunday, 24 September 2023	17:00	Final laser-run

== Results ==
Legend

- DNS — Did not start
- EL — Eliminated

=== Fencing ranking round ===
Rank	Athlete	Won	Lost	Pen.	Points
1	Lee Ji-hun (KOR)	22	6		264
2	Pavel Ilyashenko (KAZ)	20	8		250
3	Li Shuhuan (CHN)	19	9		243
4	Kirill Stadnik (KAZ)	18	10		236
5	Taishu Sato (JPN)	18	10		236
6	Zhang Linbin (CHN)	19	9	10	233
7	Chen Yan (CHN)	17	11		229
8	Nicholas Lim (SGP)	17	11		229
9	Seo Chang-wan (KOR)	17	11		229
10	Jun Woong-tae (KOR)	17	11		229
11	Luo Shuai (CHN)	18	10	10	226
12	Temirlan Abdraimov (KAZ)	16	12		222
13	Radion Khripchenko (KGZ)	15	13		215
14	Jung Jin-hwa (KOR)	15	13		215
15	Vasilii Lukianov (KGZ)	14	14		208
16	Phurit Yohuang (THA)	13	15		201
17	Georgiy Boroda-Dudochkin (KAZ)	13	15		201
18	Ilia Miagkikh (KGZ)	12	16		194
19	Chatcha Srikamol (THA)	12	16		194
20	Ryo Matsumoto (JPN)	11	17		187
21	Atai Erkinbekov (KGZ)	11	17		187
22	Phurithut Yohuang (THA)	11	17		187
23	Samuel Christian Matulatuwa (INA)	10	18		180
23	Sadriddin Kobiljonov (UZB)	10	18		180
23	Daniyar Rakhimov (UZB)	10	18		180
26	Kaoru Shinoki (JPN)	9	19		173
27	Natthaphon Kesornphrom (THA)	8	20		166
28	Mayank Chaphekar (IND)	8	20		166
29	Sentegiin Bat-Otgon (MGL)	5	23		145

=== Semifinals ===
==== Group A ====
Rank	Athlete	Fencing RR+BR	Swimming			Laser-Run			Total	Time
Rank	Athlete	Fencing RR+BR	Time	Pen.	Pts	Time	Pen.	Pts	Total	Time
1	Taishu Sato (JPN)	236 + 6	2:08.29		294	11:09.15		631	1167	+0:00
2	Luo Shuai (CHN)	226 + 2	2:11.57		287	11:09.22		631	1146	+0:21
3	Jun Woong-tae (KOR)	229 + 2	2:03.35		304	11:29.40		611	1146	+0:21
4	Li Shuhuan (CHN)	243 + 0	2:10.43		290	11:46.21		594	1127	+0:40
5	Jung Jin-hwa (KOR)	215 + 2	2:02.56		305	11:35.31		605	1127	+0:40
6	Pavel Ilyashenko (KAZ)	250 + 4	2:10.32		290	12:08.38		572	1116	+0:51
7	Kaoru Shinoki (JPN)	173 + 2	2:01.24		308	11:09.89		631	1114	+0:53
8	Kirill Stadnik (KAZ)	236 + 0	2:09.12		292	11:55.34		585	1113	+0:54
9	Phurit Yohuang (THA)	201 + 2	1:59.92		311	11:42.16		598	1112	+0:55
10	Vasilii Lukianov (KGZ)	208 + 2	2:03.68		303	11:59.90		581	1094	+1:13
11	Nicholas Lim (SGP)	229 + 2	2:08.06		294	12:15.87		565	1090	+1:17
12	Daniyar Rakhimov (UZB)	180 + 2	2:03.53		303	11:52.18		588	1073	+1:34
13	Phurithut Yohuang (THA)	187 + 4	2:04.46		302	12:21.42		559	1052	+1:55
14	Ilia Miagkikh (KGZ)	194 + 0	2:19.31		272	12:08.00		572	1038	+2:09
15	Sentegiin Bat-Otgon (MGL)	145 + 0	3:21.14		148	13:31.39		489	782	+6:25

==== Group B ====
Rank	Athlete	Fencing RR+BR	Swimming			Laser-Run			Total	Time
Rank	Athlete	Fencing RR+BR	Time	Pen.	Pts	Time	Pen.	Pts	Total	Time
1	Chen Yan (CHN)	229 + 0	2:01.33		308	11:31.35		609	1146	+0:00
2	Seo Chang-wan (KOR)	229 + 0	2:01.51		307	11:39.75		601	1137	+0:09
3	Lee Ji-hun (KOR)	264 + 0	2:05.21		300	12:07.83		573	1137	+0:09
4	Zhang Linbin (CHN)	233 + 4	2:10.44		290	11:48.78		592	1119	+0:27
5	Temirlan Abdraimov (KAZ)	222 + 0	2:12.93		285	11:47.92		593	1100	+0:46
6	Georgiy Boroda-Dudochkin (KAZ)	201 + 10	2:09.04		292	11:44.00		596	1099	+0:47
7	Radion Khripchenko (KGZ)	215 + 0	2:14.88		281	11:43.40		597	1093	+0:53
8	Ryo Matsumoto (JPN)	187 + 4	2:13.24		284	11:24.60		616	1091	+0:55
9	Atai Erkinbekov (KGZ)	187 + 0	2:19.15		272	11:28.30		612	1071	+1:15
10	Chatcha Srikamol (THA)	194 + 0	2:27.50		255	11:26.83		614	1063	+1:23
11	Natthaphon Kesornphrom (THA)	166 + 0	2:13.33		284	11:44.22		596	1046	+1:40
12	Samuel Christian Matulatuwa (INA)	180 + 0	2:02.50	10	295	12:24.58		556	1031	+1:55
13	Mayank Chaphekar (IND)	166 + 2	2:07.77		295	12:38.14		542	1005	+2:21
14	Sadriddin Kobiljonov (UZB)	180 + 6	2:07.47		296	13:12.18		508	990	+2:36

=== Final ===
==== Riding ====
Rank	Athlete	Horse	Time	Penalties			Points
Rank	Athlete	Horse	Time	Jump	Time	Other	Points
1	Lee Ji-hun (KOR)	M369	1:01.11				300
2	Chen Yan (CHN)	Xiao Ka	1:01.02				300
3	Jung Jin-hwa (KOR)	Ru Yi	59.08				300
4	Zhang Linbin (CHN)	Duo Meng	58.26	7			293
5	Ryo Matsumoto (JPN)	Yang Yang	58.01	7			293
6	Li Shuhuan (CHN)	K324	58.00	7			293
7	Jun Woong-tae (KOR)	P340	56.43	7			293
8	Georgiy Boroda-Dudochkin (KAZ)	Ka Fei	1:05.91	7	3		290
9	Phurit Yohuang (THA)	Yang Guang	59.23	14			286
10	Taishu Sato (JPN)	K254	57.18	21			279
11	Kaoru Shinoki (JPN)	M373	53.30	21			279
12	Kirill Stadnik (KAZ)	K174	1:01.08	21		10	269
13	Radion Khripchenko (KGZ)	Da Hei	51.55	21		10	269
14	Seo Chang-wan (KOR)	Dai An Na	1:12.32	59	10		231
—	Temirlan Abdraimov (KAZ)	Qing Yi	EL				0
—	Luo Shuai (CHN)	Xiao Gang Pao	EL				0
—	Pavel Ilyashenko (KAZ)	K333	EL				0
—	Atai Erkinbekov (KGZ)	Ji Xiang	EL				0

==== Swimming ====
Rank	Athlete	Time	Pen.	Points
1	Jun Woong-tae (KOR)	1:59.28		312
2	Phurit Yohuang (THA)	1:59.88		311
3	Jung Jin-hwa (KOR)	2:00.66		309
4	Chen Yan (CHN)	2:01.50		307
5	Seo Chang-wan (KOR)	2:02.09		306
6	Kaoru Shinoki (JPN)	2:02.26		306
7	Lee Ji-hun (KOR)	2:04.44		302
8	Taishu Sato (JPN)	2:04.95		301
9	Zhang Linbin (CHN)	2:06.17		298
10	Georgiy Boroda-Dudochkin (KAZ)	2:06.45		298
11	Luo Shuai (CHN)	2:06.61		297
12	Pavel Ilyashenko (KAZ)	2:07.82		295
13	Li Shuhuan (CHN)	2:07.88		295
14	Ryo Matsumoto (JPN)	2:13.70		283
15	Temirlan Abdraimov (KAZ)	2:13.77		283
16	Kirill Stadnik (KAZ)	2:09.60	10	281
17	Atai Erkinbekov (KGZ)	2:18.71		273
18	Radion Khripchenko (KGZ)	2:18.80		273

==== Laser-run ====
Rank	Athlete	Time	Pen.	Points
1	Luo Shuai (CHN)	10:22.87		678
2	Jun Woong-tae (KOR)	10:30.19		670
3	Seo Chang-wan (KOR)	10:42.36		658
4	Ryo Matsumoto (JPN)	10:47.14		653
5	Jung Jin-hwa (KOR)	10:47.83		653
6	Li Shuhuan (CHN)	10:47.96		653
7	Zhang Linbin (CHN)	10:53.65		647
8	Temirlan Abdraimov (KAZ)	10:58.86		642
9	Taishu Sato (JPN)	11:01.36		639
10	Pavel Ilyashenko (KAZ)	11:02.21		638
11	Atai Erkinbekov (KGZ)	11:10.65		630
12	Lee Ji-hun (KOR)	11:18.45		622
13	Georgiy Boroda-Dudochkin (KAZ)	11:20.79		620
14	Kaoru Shinoki (JPN)	11:25.75		615
15	Chen Yan (CHN)	11:38.68		602
16	Phurit Yohuang (THA)	12:02.38		578
17	Kirill Stadnik (KAZ)	12:33.07		547
18	Radion Khripchenko (KGZ)	12:49.77		531

==== Summary ====
Rank	Athlete	Ride	Fence RR+BR	Swim	L-run	Total	Time
1st place, gold medalist(s)	Jun Woong-tae (KOR)	293	229 + 4	312	670	1508	
2nd place, silver medalist(s)	Lee Ji-hun (KOR)	300	264 + 4	302	622	1492	+0:16
3rd place, bronze medalist(s)	Li Shuhuan (CHN)	293	243 + 0	295	653	1484	+0:24
4	Jung Jin-hwa (KOR)	300	215 + 0	309	653	1477	+0:31
5	Zhang Linbin (CHN)	293	233 + 2	298	647	1473	+0:35
6	Taishu Sato (JPN)	279	236 + 2	301	639	1457	+0:51
7	Chen Yan (CHN)	300	229 + 2	307	602	1440	+1:08
8	Seo Chang-wan (KOR)	231	229 + 0	306	658	1424	+1:24
9	Ryo Matsumoto (JPN)	293	187 + 0	283	653	1416	+1:32
10	Georgiy Boroda-Dudochkin (KAZ)	290	201 + 2	298	620	1411	+1:37
11	Phurit Yohuang (THA)	286	201 + 8	311	578	1384	+2:04
12	Kaoru Shinoki (JPN)	279	173 + 4	306	615	1377	+2:11
13	Kirill Stadnik (KAZ)	269	236 + 6	281	547	1339	+2:49
14	Radion Khripchenko (KGZ)	269	215 + 0	273	531	1288	+3:40
15	Luo Shuai (CHN)	0	226 + 2	297	678	1203	+5:05
16	Pavel Ilyashenko (KAZ)	0	250 + 0	295	638	1183	+5:25
17	Temirlan Abdraimov (KAZ)	0	222 + 0	283	642	1147	+6:01
18	Atai Erkinbekov (KGZ)	0	187 + 0	273	630	1090	+6:58
