= Modern pentathlon at the 2026 Asian Games – Men's individual =

Modern pentathlon event

Men's individual at the 2026 Asian Games
- Venue: Anjō Sports Park
- Location: Anjō, Aichi Prefecture, Japan
- Date: 16–20 September 2026
- Competitors: 36 from 18 nations

Medalists
gold medal	Li Liuchang	China
silver medal	Jun Woong-tae	South Korea
bronze medal	Lee Jong-hyeon	South Korea

The men's individual modern pentathlon competition at the 2026 Asian Games in Anjō, Aichi is held from 16 to 20 September 2026.

== Schedule ==
All times are Japan Standard Time (UTC+09:00)

Date	Time	Event
Wednesday, 16 September 2026	14:30	Fencing seeding round
Friday, 18 September 2026	10:00	Semifinal A Fencing direct elimination
Friday, 18 September 2026	10:20	Semifinal A Obstacle racing
Friday, 18 September 2026	10:40	Semifinal A Swimming
Friday, 18 September 2026	11:00	Semifinal A Laser-run
Friday, 18 September 2026	15:00	Semifinal B Fencing direct elimination
Friday, 18 September 2026	15:20	Semifinal B Obstacle racing
Friday, 18 September 2026	15:40	Semifinal B Swimming
Friday, 18 September 2026	16:00	Semifinal B Laser-run
Sunday, 20 September 2026	14:30	Final Fencing direct elimination
Sunday, 20 September 2026	14:50	Final Obstacle racing
Sunday, 20 September 2026	15:10	Final Swimming
Sunday, 20 September 2026	15:30	Final Laser-run

== Results ==
Legend

- DNS — Did not start
- EL — Eliminated

=== Fencing seeding round ===
Rank	Athlete	Won	Lost
1	Seo Chang-wan (KOR)	31	4
2	Temirlan Abdraimov (KAZ)	27	8
3	Ma Yuang (CHN)	27	8
4	Jun Woong-tae (KOR)	26	9
5	Samuel German (PHI)	24	11
6	Taishu Sato (JPN)	24	11
7	Chen Bailiang (CHN)	22	13
8	Michael Antoine Yared (LBN)	22	13
9	Lee Jong-hyeon (KOR)	22	13
10	Luo Shuai (CHN)	21	14
11	Kim Young-ha (KOR)	21	14
12	Yousuke Tomita (JPN)	20	15
13	Lev Chuvashov (KAZ)	20	15
14	Tikhon Varyokhin (KAZ)	20	15
15	Dmitriy Tretyakov (UZB)	20	15
16	Kirill Stadnik (KAZ)	20	15
17	Kazuaki Sekigawa (JPN)	19	16
18	Joseph Anthony Godbout (PHI)	19	16
19	Phurit Yohuang (THA)	19	16
20	Michael Ver Anton Comaling (PHI)	18	17
21	Kaoru Shinoki (JPN)	17	18
22	Gilbert Andrino (PHI)	17	18
23	Li Liuchang (CHN)	16	19
24	Mohammad Al-Suhaibi (KUW)	15	20
25	Omar Abushabab (PLE)	15	20
26	Atai Erkinbekov (KGZ)	14	21
27	Samuel Christian Matulatuwa (INA)	13	22
28	Muhammad Ifsan (INA)	12	23
29	Pongkrit Thatthong (THA)	11	24
30	Abdallah Abushabab (PLE)	11	24
31	Bilegt Amarsanaa (MGL)	10	25
32	Oshada Silva (SRI)	8	27
33	Abdllah Mohammad Abdalrhman (UAE)	7	28
34	Aw Jian Ting (MAS)	7	28
35	Tahir Ansari (SGP)	6	29
36	Shum Chun Hei (HKG)	5	30

=== Semifinals ===
==== Group A ====
Rank	Athlete	Fencing			Obstacle			Swimming			Laser-Run			Total	Time
Rank	Athlete	Round	Seed	Pts	Time	Pen.	Pts	Time	Pen.	Pts	Time	Pen.	Pts	Total	Time
1	Seo Chang-wan (KOR)	SF	1	238	23.91		374	57.36		314	11:19.96		621	1547	+0:00
2	Lee Jong-hyeon (KOR)	F	9	244	23.45		375	57.52		313	11:39.50		601	1533	+0:14
3	Luo Shuai (CHN)	T8	10	228	24.77		371	58.20		309	11:15.55		625	1533	+0:14
4	Tikhon Varyokhin (KAZ)	SF	14	236	22.91		377	58.28		309	11:42.09		598	1520	+0:27
5	Dmitriy Tretyakov (UZB)	T8	15	226	30.04		355	56.19		320	11:23.50		617	1518	+0:29
6	Temirlan Abdraimov (KAZ)	W	2	250	27.28		364	1:01.18		295	11:42.24		598	1507	+0:40
7	Chen Bailiang (CHN)	T8	6	230	22.78		377	57.74		312	11:52.52		588	1507	+0:40
8	Phurit Yohuang (THA)	T16	19	218	27.76		362	56.76		317	11:30.67		610	1507	+0:40
9	Michael Ver Anton Comaling (PHI)	T16	20	216	27.20		364	57.72		312	11:33.78		607	1499	+0:48
10	Gilbert Andrino (PHI)	T16	22	212	22.55		378	1:06.24		269	11:06.37		634	1493	+0:54
11	Kaoru Shinoki (JPN)	T16	21	214	27.73		362	57.78		312	11:39.15		601	1489	+0:58
12	Kazuaki Sekigawa (JPN)	T8	17	224	34.98		341	55.34		324	11:48.67		592	1481	+1:06
13	Abdallah Abushabab (PLE)	T32	30	198	26.99		364	1:01.45		293	11:59.33		581	1436	+1:51
14	Muhammad Ifsan (INA)	T16	28	208	22.28		379	1:04.99		276	12:17.95		563	1426	+2:01
15	Atai Erkinbekov (KGZ)	T16	26	210	41.50		321	1:05.20		274	12:58.38		522	1327	+3:40
16	Aw Jian Ting (MAS)	T16	34	206	39.52		327	59.86		301	13:37.30		483	1317	+3:50
17	Abdllah Mohammad Abdalrhman (UAE)	T32	33	196	35.11		340	1:10.56		248	13:22.07		498	1282	+4:25
18	Shum Chun Hei (HKG)	T16	36	204	30.72		353	54.79		327	15:42.05		358	1242	+5:05

==== Group B ====
Rank	Athlete	Fencing			Obstacle			Swimming			Laser-Run			Total	Time
Rank	Athlete	Round	Seed	Pts	Time	Pen.	Pts	Time	Pen.	Pts	Time	Pen.	Pts	Total	Time
1	Li Liuchang (CHN)	T8	23	224	22.86		377	55.58		323	11:27.98		613	1537	+0:00
2	Ma Yuang (CHN)	F	3	244	21.00		382	56.91		316	11:46.01		594	1536	+0:01
3	Jun Woong-tae (KOR)	W	4	250	34.47		342	56.25		319	11:22.36		618	1529	+0:08
4	Taishu Sato (JPN)	T8	6	230	30.91		353	57.63		312	11:09.70		631	1526	+0:11
5	Lev Chuvashov (KAZ)	T16	13	216	23.20		376	56.72		317	11:29.37		611	1520	+0:17
6	Kim Young-ha (KOR)	T17	11	218	25.63		369	53.61		332	11:50.05		590	1509	+0:28
7	Yousuke Tomita (JPN)	T8	12	228	47.63		303	56.49		318	10:54.20		646	1495	+0:42
8	Kirill Stadnik (KAZ)	T8	16	226	24.12		373	56.74		317	12:10.78		570	1486	+0:51
9	Samuel German (PHI)	SF	5	238	19.76		386	1:10.73		247	11:43.21		597	1468	+1:09
10	Samuel Christian Matulatuwa (INA)	T16	27	208	24.47		372	55.87		321	12:25.68		555	1456	+1:21
11	Joseph Anthony Godbout (PHI)	T16	18	214	34.19		343	1:04.26		279	11:47.06		593	1429	+1:48
12	Omar Abushabab (PLE)	T16	25	210	38.69		329	59.48		303	12:05.77		575	1417	+2:00
13	Pongkrit Thatthong (THA)	T32	29	198	31.14		352	58.43		308	12:42.99		538	1396	+2:21
14	Bilegt Amarsanaa (MGL)	T32	31	196	36.37		336	56.00		320	13:05.06		515	1367	+2:50
15	Oshada Silva (SRI)	T16	32	206	50.06		295	1:04.45		278	13:07.62		513	1292	+4:05
16	Michael Antoine Yared (LBN)	SF	8	236	33.51		345	1:14.37		229	14:24.63		436	1246	+4:51
17	Mohammad Al-Suhaibi (KUW)	T16	24	212	42.74		317	1:19.69		202	13:49.16		471	1202	+5:35
18	Tahir Ansari (SGP)	T16	35	204	38.32		331	1:50.62		47	14:00.66		460	1042	+8:15

=== Final ===
==== Fencing direct elimination ====
Round of 32
19	Phurit Yohuang (THA)	4
20	Michael Ver Anton Comaling (PHI)	3
16	Kirill Stadnik (KAZ)	5
23	Li Liuchang (CHN)	3

Round of 16
1	Seo Chang-wan (KOR)	4
19	Phurit Yohuang (THA)	1
10	Luo Shuai (CHN)	4
9	Lee Jong-hyeon (KOR)	3
5	Samuel German (PHI)	3
13	Lev Chuvashov (KAZ)	3
14	Tikhon Varyokhin (KAZ)	5
4	Jun Woong-tae (KOR)	4
3	Ma Yuang (CHN)	5
15	Dmitriy Tretyakov (UZB)	2
12	Yousuke Tomita (JPN)	3
6	Taishu Sato (JPN)	5
7	Chen Bailiang (CHN)	2
11	Kim Young-ha (KOR)	3
16	Kirill Stadnik (KAZ)	1
2	Temirlan Abdraimov (KAZ)	5

Quarter Finals
1	Seo Chang-wan (KOR)	2
10	Luo Shuai (CHN)	1
5	Samuel German (PHI)	5
14	Tikhon Varyokhin (KAZ)	4
3	Ma Yuang (CHN)	4
6	Taishu Sato (JPN)	4
11	Kim Young-ha (KOR)	2
2	Temirlan Abdraimov (KAZ)	5

Semi Finals
1	Seo Chang-wan (KOR)	1
5	Samuel German (PHI)	5
3	Ma Yuang (CHN)	2
2	Temirlan Abdraimov (KAZ)	4

Final
5	Samuel German (PHI)	1
2	Temirlan Abdraimov (KAZ)	5

==== Obstacle racing ====
Rank	Athlete	Time	Pen.	Points
1	Samuel German (PHI)	19.51		387
2	Ma Yuang (CHN)	20.75		383
3	Chen Bailiang (CHN)	21.98		380
4	Tikhon Varyokhin (KAZ)	22.29		379
5	Lee Jong-hyeon (KOR)	22.62		378
6	Seo Chang-wan (KOR)	22.67		377
7	Lev Chuvashov (KAZ)	22.91		377
8	Li Liuchang (CHN)	22.96		377
9	Luo Shuai (CHN)	24.32		373
10	Kim Young-ha (KOR)	25.66		368
11	Jun Woong-tae (KOR)	26.41		366
12	Temirlan Abdraimov (KAZ)	26.65		366
13	Taishu Sato (JPN)	26.67		365
14	Dmitriy Tretyakov (UZB)	26.86		365
15	Yousuke Tomita (JPN)	28.04		361
16	Michael Ver Anton Comaling (PHI)	41.73		320
17	Phurit Yohuang (THA)	43.90		314
	Kirill Stadnik (KAZ)	EL		0

==== Swimming ====
Rank	Athlete	Time	Pen.	Points
1	Kim Young-ha (KOR)	53.35		334
2	Li Liuchang (CHN)	54.17		330
3	Chen Bailiang (CHN)	54.85		326
4	Jun Woong-tae (KOR)	55.23		324
5	Ma Yuang (CHN)	55.36		324
6	Seo Chang-wan (KOR)	55.44		323
7	Yousuke Tomita (JPN)	56.17		320
8	Phurit Yohuang (THA)	56.45		318
9	Lee Jong-hyeon (KOR)	56.55		318
10	Dmitriy Tretyakov (UZB)	57.06		315
11	Lev Chuvashov (KAZ)	57.09		315
12	Kirill Stadnik (KAZ)	57.39		314
13	Tikhon Varyokhin (KAZ)	57.40		313
14	Luo Shuai (CHN)	57.89		311
15	Taishu Sato (JPN)	58.04		310
16	Temirlan Abdraimov (KAZ)	1:01.57		293
17	Michael Ver Anton Comaling (PHI)	1:02.04		290
18	Samuel German (PHI)	1:10.86		246

==== Laser-run ====
Rank	Athlete	Time	Pen.	Points
1	Li Liuchang (CHN)	10:05.13		695
2	Jun Woong-tae (KOR)	10:13.97		687
3	Lee Jong-hyeon (KOR)	10:17.26		683
4	Luo Shuai (CHN)	10:20.83		680
5	Yousuke Tomita (JPN)	10:32.77		668
6	Temirlan Abdraimov (KAZ)	10:45.61		655
7	Seo Chang-wan (KOR)	10:47.95		653
8	Taishu Sato (JPN)	10:58.34		642
9	Tikhon Varyokhin (KAZ)	11:02.61		638
10	Ma Yuang (CHN)	11:05.12		635
11	Dmitriy Tretyakov (UZB)	11:05.25		635
12	Chen Bailiang (CHN)	11:12.53		628
13	Lev Chuvashov (KAZ)	11:13.21		627
14	Kirill Stadnik (KAZ)	11:22.35		618
15	Kim Young-ha (KOR)	11:29.35		611
16	Samuel German (PHI)	11:32.90		608
17	Phurit Yohuang (THA)	11:39.30		601
18	Michael Ver Anton Comaling (PHI)	11:40.75		600H

==== Summary ====
Rank	Athlete	Fencing			Obstacle			Swimming			Laser-Run			Total	Time
Rank	Athlete	Round	Seed	Pts	Time	Pen.	Pts	Time	Pen.	Pts	Time	Pen.	Pts	Total	Time
1st place, gold medalist(s)	Li Liuchang (CHN)	T32	23	196	22.96		377	54.17		330	10:05.13		695	1598	+0:00
2nd place, silver medalist(s)	Jun Woong-tae (KOR)	T16	4	218	26.41		366	55.23		324	10:13.97		687	1595	+0:03
3rd place, bronze medalist(s)	Lee Jong-hyeon (KOR)	T16	9	214	22.62		378	56.55		318	10:17.26		683	1593	+0:05
4	Luo Shuai (CHN)	T8	10	228	24.32		373	57.89		311	10:20.83		680	1592	+0:06
5	Seo Chang-wan (KOR)	SF	1	238	22.67		377	55.44		323	10:47.95		653	1591	+0:07
6	Ma Yuang (CHN)	SF	3	236	20.75		383	55.36		324	11:05.12		635	1578	+0:20
7	Temirlan Abdraimov (KAZ)	W	2	250	26.65		366	1:01.57		293	10:45.61		655	1564	+0:34
8	Yousuke Tomita (JPN)	T16	12	212	28.04		361	56.17		320	10:32.77		668	1561	+0:37
9	Tikhon Varyokhin (KAZ)	T8	14	224	22.29		379	57.40		313	11:02.61		638	1554	+0:44
10	Chen Bailiang (CHN)	T16	7	216	21.98		380	54.85		326	11:12.53		628	1550	+0:48
11	Taishu Sato (JPN)	T8	6	230	26.67		365	58.04		310	10:58.34		642	1547	+0:51
12	Kim Young-ha (KOR)	T8	11	226	25.66		368	53.35		334	11:29.35		611	1539	+0:59
13	Lev Chuvashov (KAZ)	T16	13	210	22.91		377	57.09		315	11:13.21		627	1529	+1:09
14	Dmitriy Tretyakov (UZB)	T16	15	208	26.86		365	57.06		315	11:05.25		635	1523	+1:15
15	Samuel German (PHI)	F	5	244	19.51		387	1:10.86		246	11:32.90		608	1485	+1:53
16	Phurit Yohuang (THA)	T16	19	204	43.90		314	56.45		318	11:39.30		601	1437	+2:41
17	Michael Ver Anton Comaling (PHI)	T32	20	198	41.73		320	1:02.04		290	11:40.75		600	1408	+3:10
18	Kirill Stadnik (KAZ)	T16	16	206	EL		0	57.39		314	11:22.35		618	1138	+7:40
