= Modern pentathlon at the 2018 Asian Games – Men's individual =

Men's individual at the 2018 Asian Games
- Venue: APM Equestrian Center
- Date: 1 September 2018
- Competitors: 15 from 8 nations

Medalists
gold medal	Jun Woong-tae	South Korea
silver medal	Lee Ji-hun	South Korea
bronze medal	Luo Shuai	China

The men's individual modern pentathlon competition at the 2018 Asian Games in Jakarta was held on 1 September 2018.

== Schedule ==
All times are Western Indonesia Time (UTC+07:00)

Date	Time	Event
Saturday, 1 September 2018	11:00	Swimming
Saturday, 1 September 2018	12:15	Fencing
Saturday, 1 September 2018	15:30	Riding
Saturday, 1 September 2018	16:45	Laser-run

== Results ==
Legend

- DNF — Did not finish
- DNS — Did not start
- EL — Eliminated

=== Swimming ===
Rank	Athlete	Time	Pen.	Points
1	Jun Woong-tae (KOR)	1:57.59		315
2	Phurit Yohuang (THA)	1:59.01		312
3	Vladislav Sukharev (KAZ)	1:59.06		312
4	Lee Ji-hun (KOR)	1:59.25		312
5	Tomoyuki Ono (JPN)	1:59.50		311
6	Shohei Iwamoto (JPN)	2:02.79		305
7	Luo Shuai (CHN)	2:06.06		298
8	Li Shuhuan (CHN)	2:06.45		298
9	Temirlan Aitimbetov (KGZ)	2:07.19		296
10	Ruchapoom Infaktha (THA)	2:08.41		294
11	Radion Khripchenko (KGZ)	2:08.89		293
12	Pavel Ilyashenko (KAZ)	2:05.85	10	289
13	Yusri (INA)	2:22.91		265
14	Frada Harahap (INA)	2:33.38		244
15	Altangereliin Bat-Erdene (MGL)	DNF		0

=== Fencing ===
Rank	Athlete	Won	Lost	Pen.	Bonus	Points
1	Jun Woong-tae (KOR)	19	7		2	244
2	Lee Ji-hun (KOR)	18	8		1	235
3	Pavel Ilyashenko (KAZ)	17	9		2	228
4	Tomoyuki Ono (JPN)	17	9			226
5	Li Shuhuan (CHN)	16	10		1	219
6	Temirlan Aitimbetov (KGZ)	15	11			210
7	Shohei Iwamoto (JPN)	14	12			202
7	Luo Shuai (CHN)	14	12			202
9	Radion Khripchenko (KGZ)	12	14		5	191
10	Vladislav Sukharev (KAZ)	12	14			186
11	Ruchapoom Infaktha (THA)	11	15		1	179
12	Yusri (INA)	6	20		1	139
13	Phurit Yohuang (THA)	6	20			138
14	Frada Harahap (INA)	5	21		1	131
15	Altangereliin Bat-Erdene (MGL)	DNS				0

=== Riding ===
Rank	Athlete	Horse	Time	Penalties			Points
Rank	Athlete	Horse	Time	Jump	Time	Other	Points
1	Luo Shuai (CHN)	Braveheart	58.97				300
2	Li Shuhuan (CHN)	Primer Caballo	58.39				300
3	Pavel Ilyashenko (KAZ)	Miss Apple	1:02.45		1		299
4	Tomoyuki Ono (JPN)	Zirtaki	1:03.62		2		298
5	Radion Khripchenko (KGZ)	Bentley	57.80	7			293
6	Temirlan Aitimbetov (KGZ)	Lady Dance	56.30	7			293
7	Jun Woong-tae (KOR)	Wadecky	1:03.52	7	2		291
8	Shohei Iwamoto (JPN)	Burning	1:11.07	10	10		280
9	Lee Ji-hun (KOR)	Laura Dante	1:16.89	17	15		268
10	Frada Harahap (INA)	Levisto Big Boy	1:12.72	17	11	10	262
11	Yusri (INA)	Curd	1:23.70	27	22	10	241
12	Vladislav Sukharev (KAZ)	Smart	EL				0
13	Altangereliin Bat-Erdene (MGL)	Lisa	DNS				0
13	Phurit Yohuang (THA)	Ciliano	DNS				0
13	Ruchapoom Infaktha (THA)	Joker	DNS				0

=== Laser-run ===
Rank	Athlete	Time	Pen.	Points
1	Luo Shuai (CHN)	10:45.98		655
2	Lee Ji-hun (KOR)	10:56.40		644
3	Li Shuhuan (CHN)	11:04.30		636
4	Jun Woong-tae (KOR)	11:18.48		622
5	Pavel Ilyashenko (KAZ)	11:31.69		609
6	Radion Khripchenko (KGZ)	11:48.61		592
7	Shohei Iwamoto (JPN)	12:00.98		580
8	Tomoyuki Ono (JPN)	12:09.27		571
9	Frada Harahap (INA)	12:17.29		563
10	Vladislav Sukharev (KAZ)	12:23.16		557
11	Yusri (INA)	13:01.66		519
12	Ruchapoom Infaktha (THA)	13:18.24		502
13	Phurit Yohuang (THA)	13:42.82		478
14	Temirlan Aitimbetov (KGZ)	13:53.79		467
15	Altangereliin Bat-Erdene (MGL)	DNS		0

=== Summary ===
Rank	Athlete	Swim	Fence	Ride	L-run	Total	Time
1st place, gold medalist(s)	Jun Woong-tae (KOR)	315	244	291	622	1472	
2nd place, silver medalist(s)	Lee Ji-hun (KOR)	312	235	268	644	1459	+0:13
3rd place, bronze medalist(s)	Luo Shuai (CHN)	298	202	300	655	1455	+0:17
4	Li Shuhuan (CHN)	298	219	300	636	1453	+0:19
5	Pavel Ilyashenko (KAZ)	289	228	299	609	1425	+0:47
6	Tomoyuki Ono (JPN)	311	226	298	571	1406	+1:06
7	Radion Khripchenko (KGZ)	293	191	293	592	1369	+1:43
8	Shohei Iwamoto (JPN)	305	202	280	580	1367	+1:45
9	Temirlan Aitimbetov (KGZ)	296	210	293	467	1266	+3:26
10	Frada Harahap (INA)	244	131	262	563	1200	+4:32
11	Yusri (INA)	265	139	241	519	1164	+5:08
12	Vladislav Sukharev (KAZ)	312	186	0	557	1055	+6:57
13	Ruchapoom Infaktha (THA)	294	179	0	502	975	+8:17
14	Phurit Yohuang (THA)	312	138	0	478	928	+9:04
15	Altangereliin Bat-Erdene (MGL)	0	0	0	0	0	
