= 2026 World Modern Pentathlon Championships =

UIPM 2026 Pentathlon World Championships
- Location: Guiyang, China
- Dates: 24–30 August

The 2026 World Modern Pentathlon Championships were held from 24 to 30 August 2026 in Guiyang, China.

== Medal table ==
* Host nation (China)

Rank	Nation	Gold	Silver	Bronze	Total
1	Belarus	2	1	0	3
2	Russia	1	3	0	4
3	Great Britain	1	0	2	3
4	Hungary	1	0	1	2
4	South Korea	1	0	1	2
6	Czech Republic	1	0	0	1
7	Egypt	0	3	1	4
8	France	0	0	1	1
8	Germany	0	0	1	1
Totals (9 entries)		7	7	7	21

== Results ==
=== Men ===
Event	Gold		Silver		Bronze	
Individual	Matěj Lukeš; Czech Republic	1586	Egor Gromadskii; Russia	1581	Seo Chang-wan; South Korea	1576
Team	Russia; Egor Gromadskii; Andrey Bobrov; Petr Borshchev	4693	Egypt; Mohanad Shaban; Moutaz Mohamed; Mohamed El-Ashqar	4687	France; Valentin Belaud; Ugo Fleurot; Léo Bories	4482
Relay	Great Britain; Ross Charlton; Sebastian Forrest	1513	Russia; Egor Gromadskii; Andrey Bobrov	1494	Germany; Marvin Dogue; Moriz Klinkert	1487

=== Women ===
Event	Gold		Silver		Bronze	
Individual	Blanka Guzi; Hungary	1485	Farida Khalil; Egypt	1474	Kerenza Bryson; Great Britain	1464
Team	Belarus; Anastasiya Arol; Mariya Gnedtchik; Viyaleta Hureyeva	4356	Egypt; Farida Khalil; Jana Attia; Ganah El-Gindy	4347	Great Britain; Kerenza Bryson; Emma Whitaker; Poppy Clark	4313
Relay	Belarus; Anastasiya Arol; Mariya Gnedtchik	1351	Russia; Viktoriia Sazonova; Yana Soloveva	1325	Egypt; Zeina Amer; Jana Attia	1302

=== Mixed ===
Event	Gold		Silver		Bronze	
Relay	South Korea; Seo Chang-wan; Seong Seung-min	1096	Belarus; Yauheni Arol; Viyaleta Hureyeva	1078	Hungary; Zsombor Tárkányi; Blanka Guzi	1076
