= Lee Ji-hun (pentathlete) =

South Korean modern pentathlete

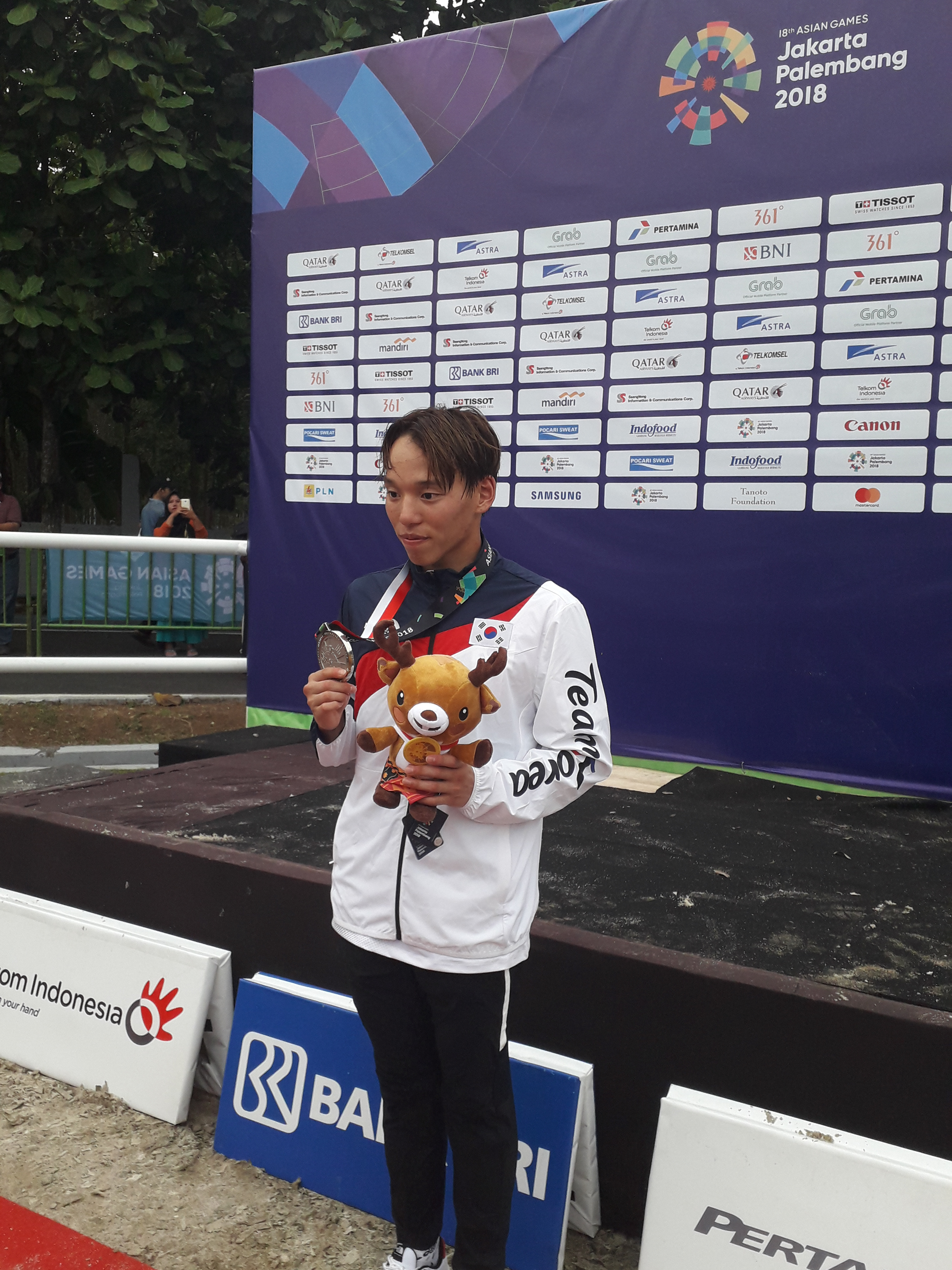
- Lee Ji-hun in 2018

Personal information
- Born: 14 November 1995 (age 30)

Sport
- Country: South Korea
- Sport: Modern pentathlon
Medal record
Men's modern pentathlon
Representing South Korea
World Championships
Gold medal – first place	2019 Budapest	Team
Bronze medal – third place	2023 Bath	Team
Bronze medal – third place	2023 Bath	Relay
Asian Games
Gold medal – first place	2022 Hangzhou	Team
Silver medal – second place	2018 Jakarta	Individual
Silver medal – second place	2022 Hangzhou	Individual

Lee Ji-hun (born 14 November 1995) is a South Korean modern pentathlete. He won the silver medal in the men's event at the 2018 Asian Games held in Jakarta, Indonesia.

He earned a spot for a competitor to represent South Korea at the 2020 Summer Olympics in Tokyo, Japan after winning the gold medal in the men's individual event at the 2019 Asia/Oceania Championships & Olympic Qualifier. Jung Jin-hwa competed at the 2020 Summer Olympics in the men's modern penthathlon.
