= 2025 World U19 Modern Pentathlon Championships =

2025 World U19 Championships
- Venue: LSC sport center
- Location: Druskininkai, Lithuania
- Dates: 19-23 August 2025
- Competitors: 154 from 32 nations

Champions
- Men: (Hungary) Nemere Szécsi
- Women: (Egypt) Farida Khalil

The 2025 World U19 Modern Pentathlon Championships was held between 19 and 23 of August 2025 in Druskininkai, Lithuania.

== Venue ==
The competition was held in Druskininkai, a Lithuanian spa town known. The event was hosted by the Lithuanian Modern Pentathlon Federation in close collaboration with UIPM.

== Medal table ==
* Host nation (Lithuania)

Rank	Nation	Gold	Silver	Bronze	Total
1	Egypt	2	1	0	3
2	Ukraine	1	1	0	2
3	Hungary	1	0	1	2
4	Germany	0	1	1	2
5	Poland	0	1	0	1
6	Brazil	0	0	1	1
6	Czech Republic	0	0	1	1
Totals (7 entries)		4	4	4	12

== Results ==
=== Men ===
Event	Gold		Silver		Bronze	
Individual	Nemere Szécsi (HUN)	1577	Oleg Rybak (UKR)	1562	Jhon Xavier (BRA)	1556
Team	Ukraine; Oleg Rybak; Oleksandr Chernyshev; Maksym Kovalchuk	4644	Egypt; Omar Amer; Sief Soliman; Mohamed Hassan	4628	Czech Republic; Tobias Raška; Matyáš Štegmann; Dan Vorlíček	4590

=== Women ===
Event	Gold		Silver		Bronze	
Individual	Farida Khalil (EGY)	1465	Hanna Jakubowska (POL)	1449	Amaya El-Masri (GER)	1430
Team	Egypt; Farida Khalil; Sarah Mohamed; Ganah El-Gindy	4287	Germany; Charlotte Keister; Amaya El-Masri; Nadja Farmand	4238	Hungary; Ivola Turbucz; Diána Rajncsák; Emma Herbák	4205

== Participanting countries ==
A total of 154 competitors from the national teams of the following 32 countries competed

- Argentina (1)
- Brazil (2)
- Bulgaria (2)
- Canada (6)
- Chinese Taipei (6)
- Czech Republic (8)
- Ecuador (4)
- Egypt (11)
- France (4)
- Georgia (1)
- Germany (7)
- Great Britain (7)
- Guatemala (8)
- Hungary (7)
- Ireland (3)
- Italy (6)
- Japan (4)
- Kuwait (3)
- Latvia (1)
- Lithuania (16)
- Moldova (1)
- Poland (10)
- Portugal (2)
- Saudi Arabia (1)
- South Africa (4)
- South Korea (8)
- Spain (5)
- Switzerland (2)
- Turkey (2)
- Ukraine (9)
- United States (1)
- Uzbekistan (2)
