= Li Shuhuan =

Chinese modern pentathlete

Personal information
- Nationality: Chinese
- Born: 25 October 1996 (age 29)

Sport
- Sport: Modern pentathlon
Medal record
Men's modern pentathlon
Representing China
Asian Games
Silver medal – second place	2022 Hangzhou	Team
Bronze medal – third place	2022 Hangzhou	Individual

Li Shuhuan (born 25 October 1996) is a Chinese modern pentathlete. He competed in the men's event at the 2020 Summer Olympics. He also competed in the men's individual event at the 2018 Asian Games held in Jakarta, Indonesia.
