= Ross Charlton =

British modern pentathlete (born 2002)

Personal information
- Nationality: British
- Born: 23 May 2002 (age 24)
- Education: University of Bath

Sport
- Country: Great Britain
- Sport: Modern pentathlon
- Club: Morpeth Harriers
Medal record
Men's modern pentathlon
Representing Great Britain
World Championships
Gold medal – first place	2026 Guiyang	Relay
European Championships
Bronze medal – third place	2026 Istanbul	Mixed relay
Junior World Championships
Silver medal – second place	2023 Druskininkai	Team

Ross Charlton (born 23 May 2002) is a British modern pentathlete. He won the gold medal in the relay at the 2026 World Modern Pentathlon Championships.

== Career ==
Charlton trained with the Morpeth Amateur Swimming Association became a member of Morpeth Harriers as a teenager, and took part in biathlon as well as being part of the Morpeth team that won the Northern Cross Country title in 2019, and was first finisher for the club at the National Cross Country Championships in 2020. He also joined Newcastle Fencing and Shooting Club and in 2019 won a LaserRun World Championship U19 gold medal in Budapest.

Later a student at the University of Bath where he trained in modern pentathlon, in March 2022, Charlton won a medal on his UIPM Modern Pentathlon World Cup debut in Cairo. Alongside Jessica Varley, he finished as runner-up in the mixed relay competition. He won team silver at the 2023 World Junior Modern Pentathlon Championships held in September 2023 in Druskininkai, Lithuania, alongside Charlie Brown and James Hulme.

Alongside Emma Whitaker, he won the bronze medal in the mixed relay at the 2026 European Modern Pentathlon Championships in Istanbul in August 2026. Alongside Sebastian Forrest, later that month, Charlton won the gold medal in the relay at the 2026 World Modern Pentathlon Championships.
