= Sebastian Forrest =

British modern pentathlete (born 2007)

Personal information
- Nationality: British
- Born: 14 March 2007 (age 19)
- Education: Millfield; University of Bath

Sport
- Country: Great Britain
- Sport: Modern pentathlon

Achievements and titles
- Highest world ranking: 7th Junior 2026
Medal record
Men's modern pentathlon
Representing Great Britain
World Championships
Gold medal – first place	2026 Guiyang	Relay

Sebastian Forrest (born 14 March 2007) is a British modern pentathlete. He won the gold medal in the men’s relay at the 2026 World Modern Pentathlon Championships.

== Biography ==
From Gloucestershire, Forrest was educated at Millfield before beginning to study Maths in September 2025 at the University of Bath, where he also trains in modern pentathlon.

Forrest became was the youngest elite modern pentathlete on the world-class programme, gaining UK Sport funding, at the age of 17 years-old. His pathway into the sport began at an early age, training in swimming, running and shooting with Severnside Tritons, Stroud Athletics Club and Cotswold Pentathlon. He was also a member of Leweston Pentathlon Academy in Sherborne. In 2017, he competed at the Biathle World Championships in Viverio, Spain as well as the 2017 Laser Run World Championships in South Africa. In 2018, he competed at the European Triathle Championships in Germany where he was part of the Team GB's under-13 gold medal winning team.

Alongside Chloe Johnson, Forrest won the gold medal in the mixed relay at the UIPM 2023 U17 World Championships in Alexandra, Egypt. He went on to compete at the Junior U22 World Championships in Hungary. He also won a gold medal at the 2024 European Cup in Barcelona.

In his debut senior season Forrest came 5th in the Budapest World Cup in June 2026.

Forrest came 4th in the Junior World Championships in Kaunas, Lithuania in July 2026.

Alongside Ross Charlton in August 2026, Forrest won the gold medal in the men’s relay at the 2026 World Modern Pentathlon Championships in China.
