= Farida Khalil =

Egyptian modern pentathlete (born 2011)

- Khalil in 2026

Personal information
- Nationality: Egyptian

Sport
- Sport: Modern pentathlon
Medal record
Women's modern pentathlon
Representing Egypt
World Championships
Gold medal – first place	2025 Kaunas	Individual
Silver medal – second place	2026 Guiyang	Individual
Silver medal – second place	2026 Guiyang	Team
Bronze medal – third place	2025 Kaunas	Team
World Relay Championships
Gold medal – first place	2025 Alexandria	Relay
Gold medal – first place	2025 Alexandria	Mixed relay

Farida Khalil (born January 2011) is an Egyptian modern pentathlete. She won the 2025 World Modern Pentathlon Championships.

== Career ==
Khalil is coached by her father and trains at the El Shams Sporting Club in Cairo. She was a gold medalist in the relay at the 2023 World Junior Modern Pentathlon Championships alongside Malak Ismail in Druskininkai, Lithuania.

During the 2025 season, she won the under-17, under-19 and under-22 World Championship titles before then moving up to senior events. She won her first senior Modern Pentathlon World Cup gold medal in July 2025 at the age of 14.

In August 2025, she won the individual gold medal at the 2025 World Modern Pentathlon Championships in Kaunas, Lithuania in August 2025, winning by a significant margin, finishing it 11.95 seconds ahead of Hungary's Blanka Guzi. The unprecedented feat of winning every major world title in modern pentathlon in the same season, from three youth grades through to the women's senior championship was called the 'Farida Slam' by world governing body of the sport, the Union Internationale de Pentathlon Moderne.

Khalil at the 2026 World Championships

Khalil won the silver medal in the women’s individual event at the 2026 World Modern Pentathlon Championships in Guiyang, China, in August 2026, finishing runner-up to Blanka Guzi of Hungary. Her efforts also led Egypt to the silver in the women’s team event.
