= Modern pentathlon at the 2026 Asian Games – Women's team =

Modern pentathlon event

Women's team at the 2026 Asian Games
- Venue: Anjō Sports Park
- Location: Anjō, Aichi Prefecture, Japan
- Date: 16–20 September 2026
- Competitors: 24 from 7 nations

Medalists
gold medal	China; Zhang Mingyu, Wu Xiyao, Meng Xin
silver medal	South Korea; Seong Seung-min, Kim Un-ju, Shin Su-min
bronze medal	Japan; Misaki Uchida, Ayumu Saito, Yuho Yano

The wen's modern pentathlon competition at the 2026 Asian Games in Anjō, Aichi is held from 16 to 20 September 2026.

At the end of the individual competition, results for the 3 best members of each team determined the results of the team classification. Teams with more athletes in the final were ranked higher.

== Schedule ==
All times are Japan Standard Time (UTC+09:00)

Date	Time	Event
Wednesday, 16 September 2026	10:00	Fencing seeding round
Thursday, 17 September 2026	10:00	Semifinal A Fencing direct elimination
Thursday, 17 September 2026	10:20	Semifinal A Obstacle racing
Thursday, 17 September 2026	10:40	Semifinal A Swimming
Thursday, 17 September 2026	11:00	Semifinal A Laser-run
Thursday, 17 September 2026	15:00	Semifinal B Fencing direct elimination
Thursday, 17 September 2026	15:20	Semifinal B Obstacle racing
Thursday, 17 September 2026	15:40	Semifinal B Swimming
Thursday, 17 September 2026	16:00	Semifinal B Laser-run
Sunday, 20 September 2026	10:00	Final Fencing direct elimination
Sunday, 20 September 2026	10:20	Final Obstacle racing
Sunday, 20 September 2026	10:40	Final Swimming
Sunday, 20 September 2026	11:00	Final Laser-run

== Results ==
Rank	Team	Fencing	Obstacle	Swimming	Laser-run	Total	F
1st place, gold medalist(s)	China (CHN)	694	1070	883	1671	4318	3
	Zhang Mingyu	236	353	296	575	1460	
	Wu Xiyao	230	359	296	562	1447	
	Meng Xin	228	358	291	534	1411	
	Fu Jing	~~218~~	~~363~~	~~298~~	~~510~~	~~1389~~	
2nd place, silver medalist(s)	South Korea (KOR)	708	1048	840	1685	4271	3
	Seong Seung-min	250	358	295	589	1492	
	Kim Un-ju	244	340	259	556	1399	
	Shin Su-min	214	350	286	530	1380	
	Jang Ha-eun	~~210~~	~~259~~	~~275~~	~~589~~	~~1333~~	
3rd place, bronze medalist(s)	Japan (JPN)	642	958	874	1695	4169	3
	Misaki Uchida	208	319	303	572	1402	
	Ayumu Saito	238	353	271	523	1385	
	Yuho Yano	196	286	300	600	1382	
	Yuri Suzuki	~~206~~	~~321~~	~~295~~	~~529~~	~~1351~~	
4	Kazakhstan (KAZ)	626	989	842	1462	3919	3
	Yuliana Petrova	204	339	285	521	1349	
	Ayana Kazbekova	198	331	271	529	1329	
	Diana Chshedrova	224	319	286	412	1241	
5	Indonesia (INA)	632	949	841	1338	3760	1
	Caroline Andita Bangun	216	355	291	476	1338	
	Sri Wahyuni	210	283	266	493	1252	SF
	Nurfa Inayah Nurul Qalbi	206	311	284	369	1170	SF
6	Philippines (PHI)	674	955	634	1613	3876	0
	Shyra Mae Aranzado	214	307	241	540	1302	SF
	Juliana Shane Sevilla	224	339	178	547	1288	SF
	Princess Honey Arbilon	236	309	215	526	1286	SF
7	Thailand (THA)	630	632	527	1349	3286	0
	Parita Paisansrisin	214	314	249	491	1268	SF
	Chananan Witsaphan	212	318	178	419	1127	SF
	Aphisaraporn Trongtorkit	204	0	248	439	891	SF
