= Seong Seung-min =

South Korean modern pentathlete (born 2003)

Personal information
- Born: 13 May 2003 (age 23) Daegu, South Korea

Sport
- Country: South Korea
- Sport: Modern pentathlon
Medal record
Women's modern pentathlon
Representing South Korea
Olympic Games
| Bronze medal – third place | 2024 Paris | Individual |
World Championships
| Gold medal – first place | 2024 Zhengzhou | Individual |
| Gold medal – first place | 2026 Guiyang | Mixed relay |
| Silver medal – second place | 2024 Zhengzhou | Team |
World Relay Championships
| Bronze medal – third place | 2025 Alexandria | Mixed relay |
Asian Games
| Gold medal – first place | 2026 Nagoya | Individual |
| Silver medal – second place | 2026 Nagoya | Team |

Seong Seung-min (Korean: 성승민; born 13 May 2003) is a South Korean modern pentathlete. She became the individual world champion in 2024 and won a bronze medal at the 2024 Summer Olympics in Paris.

== Career ==
She won gold in the individual event and silver in the team event at the 2024 World Modern Pentathlon Championships. In doing so, she became the first South Korean woman to win a world title in the event.

She competed at the 2024 Summer Olympics in Paris in August 2024, winning the bronze medal in the individual event, becoming the first Asian female pentathlete to win an Olympic medal.

In August 2026, she won the gold medal in the mixed relay alongside Seo Chang-wan at the 2026 World Modern Pentathlon Championships. In September, she won the gold medal in the modern pentathlon at the 2026 Asian Games in Japan, leading the event from the opening discipline onwards. In doing so, she became the first South Korean female pentathlete to win the individual event. Alongside Kim Un-ju and Shin Su-min, she also led South Korea to the silver medal in the team event.
