= Modern pentathlon at the 2026 Asian Games – Women's individual =

Modern pentathlon event

Women's individual at the 2026 Asian Games
- Venue: Anjō Sports Park
- Location: Anjō, Aichi Prefecture, Japan
- Date: 16–20 September 2026
- Competitors: 33 from 13 nations

Medalists
gold medal	Seong Seung-min	South Korea
silver medal	Zhang Mingyu	China
bronze medal	Wu Xiyao	China

The women's individual modern pentathlon competition at the 2026 Asian Games in Anjō, Aichi is held from 16 to 20 September 2026.

== Schedule ==
All times are Japan Standard Time (UTC+09:00)

Date	Time	Event
Wednesday, 16 September 2026	10:00	Fencing seeding round
Thursday, 17 September 2026	10:00	Semifinal A Fencing direct elimination
Thursday, 17 September 2026	10:20	Semifinal A Obstacle racing
Thursday, 17 September 2026	10:40	Semifinal A Swimming
Thursday, 17 September 2026	11:00	Semifinal A Laser-run
Thursday, 17 September 2026	15:00	Semifinal B Fencing direct elimination
Thursday, 17 September 2026	15:20	Semifinal B Obstacle racing
Thursday, 17 September 2026	15:40	Semifinal B Swimming
Thursday, 17 September 2026	16:00	Semifinal B Laser-run
Sunday, 20 September 2026	10:00	Final Fencing direct elimination
Sunday, 20 September 2026	10:20	Final Obstacle racing
Sunday, 20 September 2026	10:40	Final Swimming
Sunday, 20 September 2026	11:00	Final Laser-run

== Results ==
Legend

- DNS — Did not start
- EL — Eliminated

=== Fencing seeding round ===
Rank	Athlete	Won	Lost
1	Ayumu Saito (JPN)	25	7
2	Seong Seung-min (KOR)	24	8
3	Zhang Mingyu (CHN)	24	8
4	Kim Un-ju (KOR)	23	9
5	Wu Xiyao (CHN)	22	10
6	Fu Jing (CHN)	22	10
7	Princess Honey Arbilon (PHI)	22	10
8	Meng Xin (CHN)	20	12
9	Caroline Andita Bangun (INA)	20	12
10	Mehriniso Kahramaonova (UZB)	20	12
11	Shin Su-min (KOR)	19	13
12	Diana Chshedrova (KAZ)	19	13
13	Samira Abzalova (UZB)	19	13
14	Jang Ha-eun (KOR)	18	14
15	Misaki Uchida (JPN)	17	15
16	Ayana Kazbekova (KAZ)	17	15
17	Yuri Suzuki (JPN)	16	16
18	Shyra Mae Aranzado (PHI)	16	16
19	Juliana Shane Sevilla (PHI)	15	17
20	Parita Paisansrisin (THA)	14	18
21	Yuho Yano (JPN)	14	18
22	Yuliana Petrova (KAZ)	14	18
23	Chananan Witsaphan (THA)	13	19
24	Sri Wahyuni (INA)	12	20
25	Riana Osmanova (KGZ)	10	22
26	Habari Al-Thuwaini (KUW)	10	22
27	Lim Pei Yao (MAS)	9	23
28	Liu Hei Yu (HKG)	9	23
29	Mariia Shtukina (KGZ)	9	23
30	Nurfa Inayah Nurul Qalbi (INA)	8	24
31	Aphisaraporn Trongtorkit (THA)	8	24
32	Retaj Abd Al-Hussain (KUW)	7	25
33	Gayani Kumari (SRI)	6	26

=== Semifinals ===
==== Group A ====
Rank	Athlete	Fencing			Obstacle			Swimming			Laser-Run			Total	Time
Rank	Athlete	Round	Seed	Pts	Time	Pen.	Pts	Time	Pen.	Pts	Time	Pen.	Pts	Total	Time
1	Fu Jing (CHN)	SF	6	238	27.62		363	1:04.13		280	13:36.04		484	1365	+0:00
2	Seong Seung-min (KOR)	W	2	250	30.84		353	1:05.30		274	13:32.43		488	1365	+0:00
3	Misaki Uchida (JPN)	T8	15	226	42.47		318	1:00.79		297	12:56.44		524	1365	+0:00
4	Meng Xin (CHN)	T8	8	230	30.23		355	1:06.20		269	13:09.90		511	1365	+0:00
5	Ayana Kazbekova (KAZ)	T16	16	216	35.50		339	1:06.40		268	12:40.41		540	1363	+0:02
6	Shin Su-min (KOR)	T8	11	228	41.45		321	1:02.88		286	12:58.41		522	1357	+0:08
7	Ayumu Saito (JPN)	F	1	244	36.16		337	1:07.08		265	13:12.70		508	1354	+0:11
8	Caroline Andita Bangun (INA)	T16	9	218	32.26		349	1:02.81		286	13:22.03		498	1351	+0:14
9	Yuliana Petrova (KAZ)	T8	22	224	38.22		331	1:03.13		285	13:15.24		505	1345	+0:20
10	Shyra Mae Aranzado (PHI)	T16	18	214	46.16		307	1:11.81		241	12:40.02		540	1302	+1:03
11	Princess Honey Arbilon (PHI)	SF	7	236	45.50		309	1:17.14		215	12:54.10		526	1286	+1:19
12	Nurfa Inayah Nurul Qalbi (INA)	T16	30	206	44.68		311	1:03.39		284	15:31.91		369	1170	+3:15
13	Mariia Shtukina (KGZ)	T16	29	208	1:01.84		260	1:14.07		230	15:30.05		370	1068	+4:57
14	Aphisaraporn Trongtorkit (THA)	T16	31	204	EL		0	1:10.55		248	14:21.51		439	891	+7:54
15	Lim Pei Yao (MAS)	T16	27	210	EL		0	1:11.88		241	15:50.79		350	801	+9:24
16	Retaj Abd Al-Hussain (KUW)	T32	32	198	EL		0	1:49.67		52	20:29.91		71	321	+17:24
17	Habari Al-Thuwaini (KUW)	T16	26	212	EL		0	2:09.42		0	21:23.71		17	229	+18:56

==== Group B ====
Rank	Athlete	Fencing			Obstacle			Swimming			Laser-Run			Total	Time
Rank	Athlete	Round	Seed	Pts	Time	Pen.	Pts	Time	Pen.	Pts	Time	Pen.	Pts	Total	Time
1	Yuho Yano (JPN)	SF	21	236	47.03		304	1:00.69		297	12:32		548	1385	+0:00
2	Yuri Suzuki (JPN)	T16	17	216	33.79		344	1:01.13		295	12:50		530	1385	+0:00
3	Mehriniso Kahramaonova (UZB)	T8	10	228	29.58		357	1:05.37		274	12:55		525	1384	+0:01
4	Zhang Mingyu (CHN)	SF	3	238	32.53		348	1:04.84		276	13:09		511	1373	+0:12
5	Diana Chshedrova (KAZ)	W	12	250	38.73		329	1:03.19		285	13:28		492	1356	+0:29
6	Wu Xiyao (CHN)	T8	5	230	29.02		358	1:04.19		280	13:40		480	1348	+0:37
7	Jang Ha-eun (KOR)	T8	14	226	50.91		293	1:04.28		279	12:37		543	1341	+0:44
8	Kim Un-ju (KOR)	F	4	244	34.32		343	1:09.90		251	13:17		503	1341	+0:44
9	Samira Abzalova (UZB)	T16	13	218	45.43		309	1:06.74		267	12:55		525	1319	+1:06
10	Juliana Shane Sevilla (PHI)	T8	19	224	35.52		339	1:24.58		178	12:33		547	1288	+1:37
11	Parita Paisansrisin (THA)	T16	20	214	43.66		314	1:10.35		249	13:29		491	1268	+1:57
12	Sri Wahyuni (INA)	T16	24	210	54.11		283	1:06.94		266	13:27		493	1252	+2:13
13	Liu Hei Yu (HKG)	T16	28	206	47.78		302	1:00.37		299	16:07		333	1140	+4:05
14	Chananan Witsaphan (THA)	T16	23	212	42.42		318	1:24.52		178	14:41		419	1127	+4:18
15	Gayani Kumari (SRI)	T16	33	204	1:01.61		261	1:21.32		194	15:46		354	1013	+6:12
16	Riana Osmanova (KGZ)	T16	25	208	1:06.71		245	1:11.06		245	DNF		0	698	+11:27

=== Final ===
==== Fencing direct elimination ====
Round of 32
17	Yuri Suzuki (JPN)	5
21	Yuho Yano (JPN)	4
16	Ayana Kazbekova (KAZ)	2
22	Yuliana Petrova (KAZ)	5

Round of 16
1	Ayumu Saito (JPN)	3
17	Yuri Suzuki (JPN)	3
10	Mehriniso Kahramaonova (UZB)	4
9	Caroline Andita Bangun (INA)	2
5	Wu Xiyao (CHN)	4
13	Samira Abzalova (UZB)	0
14	Jang Ha-eun (KOR)	4
4	Kim Un-ju (KOR)	4
3	Zhang Mingyu (CHN)	3
15	Misaki Uchida (JPN)	3
12	Diana Chshedrova (KAZ)	5
6	Fu Jing (CHN)	4
8	Meng Xin (CHN)	5
11	Shin Su-min (KOR)	0
22	Yuliana Petrova (KAZ)	4
2	Seong Seung-min (KOR)	5

Quarter Finals
1	Ayumu Saito (JPN)	5
10	Mehriniso Kahramaonova (UZB)	4
5	Wu Xiyao (CHN)	0
4	Kim Un-ju (KOR)	2
3	Zhang Mingyu (CHN)	4
12	Diana Chshedrova (KAZ)	1
8	Meng Xin (CHN)	0
2	Seong Seung-min (KOR)	5

Semi Finals
1	Ayumu Saito (JPN)	2
4	Kim Un-ju (KOR)	4
3	Zhang Mingyu (CHN)	1
2	Seong Seung-min (KOR)	4

Final
4	Kim Un-ju (KOR)	2
2	Seong Seung-min (KOR)	2

==== Obstacle racing ====
Rank	Athlete	Time	Pen.	Points
1	Fu Jing (CHN)	27.39		363
2	Wu Xiyao (CHN)	28.74		359
3	Mehriniso Kahramaonova (UZB)	29.14		358
4	Seong Seung-min (KOR)	29.26		358
5	Meng Xin (CHN)	29.29		358
6	Caroline Andita Bangun (INA)	30.12		355
7	Zhang Mingyu (CHN)	30.83		353
8	Ayumu Saito (JPN)	30.94		353
9	Shin Su-min (KOR)	31.70		350
10	Samira Abzalova (UZB)	32.84		347
11	Kim Un-ju (KOR)	35.25		340
12	Yuliana Petrova (KAZ)	35.33		339
13	Ayana Kazbekova (KAZ)	38.31		331
14	Yuri Suzuki (JPN)	41.47		321
15	Misaki Uchida (JPN)	42.00		319
16	Diana Chshedrova (KAZ)	42.07		319
17	Yuho Yano (JPN)	53.27		286
18	Jang Ha-eun (KOR)	1:02.15		259

==== Swimming ====
Rank	Athlete	Time	Pen.	Points
1	Misaki Uchida (JPN)	59.52		303
2	Yuho Yano (JPN)	1:00.13		300
3	Fu Jing (CHN)	1:00.51		298
4	Zhang Mingyu (CHN)	1:00.85		296
5	Wu Xiyao (CHN)	1:00.87		296
6	Yuri Suzuki (JPN)	1:01.11		295
7	Seong Seung-min (KOR)	1:01.14		295
8	Caroline Andita Bangun (INA)	1:01.85		291
9	Meng Xin (CHN)	1:01.86		291
10	Shin Su-min (KOR)	1:02.80		286
11	Diana Chshedrova (KAZ)	1:02.95		286
12	Yuliana Petrova (KAZ)	1:03.05		285
13	Jang Ha-eun (KOR)	1:05.19		275
14	Mehriniso Kahramaonova (UZB)	1:05.34		274
15	Ayumu Saito (JPN)	1:05.90		271
16	Ayana Kazbekova (KAZ)	1:05.93		271
17	Samira Abzalova (UZB)	1:06.58		268
18	Kim Un-ju (KOR)	1:08.34		259

==== Laser-run ====
Rank	Athlete	Time	Pen.	Points
1	Yuho Yano (JPN)	11:40.75		600
2	Seong Seung-min (KOR)	11:51.20		589
3	Jang Ha-eun (KOR)	11:51.35		589
4	Mehriniso Kahramaonova (UZB)	12:04.61		576
5	Zhang Mingyu (CHN)	12:05.11		575
6	Misaki Uchida (JPN)	12:08.53		572
7	Wu Xiyao (CHN)	12:18.16		562
8	Kim Un-ju (KOR)	12:24.34		556
9	Samira Abzalova (UZB)	12:25.25		555
10	Meng Xin (CHN)	12:46.61		534
11	Shin Su-min (KOR)	12:50.97		530
13	Ayana Kazbekova (KAZ)	12:51.37		529
12	Yuri Suzuki (JPN)	12:51.90		529
14	Ayumu Saito (JPN)	12:57.26		523
15	Yuliana Petrova (KAZ)	12:59.77		521
16	Fu Jing (CHN)	13:10.66		510
17	Caroline Andita Bangun (INA)	13:44.83		476
18	Diana Chshedrova (KAZ)	14:48.21		412

==== Summary ====
Rank	Athlete	Fencing			Obstacle			Swimming			Laser-Run			Total	Time
Rank	Athlete	Round	Seed	Pts	Time	Pen.	Pts	Time	Pen.	Pts	Time	Pen.	Pts	Total	Time
1st place, gold medalist(s)	Seong Seung-min (KOR)	W	2	250	29.26		358	1:01.14		295	11:51		589	1492	+0:00
2nd place, silver medalist(s)	Zhang Mingyu (CHN)	SF	3	236	30.83		353	1:00.85		296	12:05		575	1460	+0:32
3rd place, bronze medalist(s)	Wu Xiyao (CHN)	T8	5	230	28.74		359	1:00.87		296	12:18		562	1447	+0:45
4	Mehriniso Kahramaonova (UZB)	T8	10	226	29.14		358	1:05.34		274	12:04		576	1434	+0:58
5	Meng Xin (CHN)	T8	8	228	29.29		358	1:01.86		291	12:46		534	1411	+1:21
6	Misaki Uchida (JPN)	T16	15	208	42.00		319	59.52		303	12:08		572	1402	+1:30
7	Kim Un-ju (KOR)	F	4	244	35.25		340	1:08.34		259	12:24		556	1399	+1:33
8	Fu Jing (CHN)	T16	6	218	27.39		363	1:00.51		298	13:10		510	1389	+1:43
9	Ayumu Saito (JPN)	SF	1	238	30.94		353	1:05.90		271	12:57		523	1385	+1:47
10	Yuho Yano (JPN)	T32	21	196	53.27		286	1:00.13		300	11:40		600	1382	+1:50
11	Samira Abzalova (UZB)	T16	13	212	32.84		347	1:06.58		268	12:25		555	1382	+1:50
12	Shin Su-min (KOR)	T16	11	214	31.70		350	1:02.80		286	12:50		530	1380	+1:52
13	Yuri Suzuki (JPN)	T16	17	206	41.47		321	1:01.11		295	12:51		529	1351	+2:21
14	Yuliana Petrova (KAZ)	T16	22	204	35.33		339	1:03.05		285	12:59		521	1349	+2:23
15	Caroline Andita Bangun (INA)	T16	9	216	30.12		355	1:01.85		291	13:44		476	1338	+2:34
16	Jang Ha-eun (KOR)	T16	14	210	1:02.15		259	1:05.19		275	11:51		589	1333	+2:39
17	Ayana Kazbekova (KAZ)	T32	16	198	38.31		331	1:05.93		271	12:51		529	1329	+2:43
18	Diana Chshedrova (KAZ)	T8	12	224	42.07		319	1:02.95		286	14:48		412	1241	+4:11
