= Jun Woong-tae =

South Korean modern pentathlete

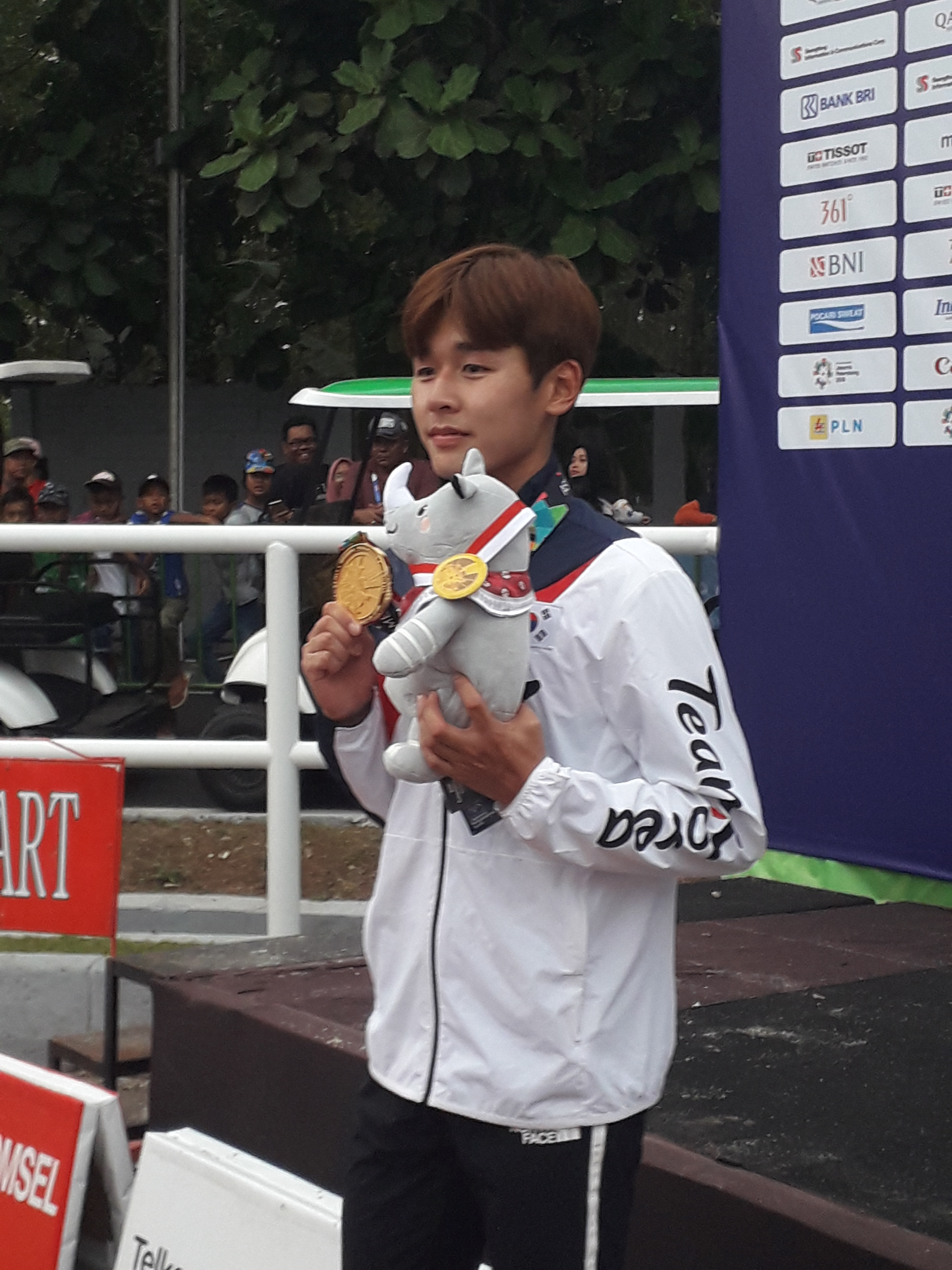
- Jun in 2018

Personal information
- Nationality: South Korean
- Born: 1 August 1995 (age 31) Seoul, South Korea
- Height: 1.75 m (5 ft 9 in)
- Weight: 66 kg (146 lb)

Korean name
- Hangul: 전웅태
- RR: Jeon Ungtae
- MR: Chŏn Ungt'ae

Sport
- Country: South Korea
- Sport: Modern pentathlon
- Club: Gwangju city hall
Medal record
Men's modern pentathlon
Representing South Korea
Olympic Games
Bronze medal – third place	2020 Tokyo	Individual
World Championships
Gold medal – first place	2015 Berlin	Team
Gold medal – first place	2016 Moscow	Relay
Gold medal – first place	2017 Cairo	Relay
Gold medal – first place	2019 Budapest	Team
Gold medal – first place	2022 Alexandria	Relay
Gold medal – first place	2022 Alexandria	Mixed relay
Gold medal – first place	2024 Zhengzhou	Relay
Silver medal – second place	2019 Budapest	Relay
Silver medal – second place	2021 Cairo	Relay
Silver medal – second place	2023 Bath	Mixed relay
Silver medal – second place	2024 Zhengzhou	Team
Bronze medal – third place	2016 Moscow	Team
Bronze medal – third place	2017 Cairo	Team
Bronze medal – third place	2019 Budapest	Individual
Bronze medal – third place	2023 Bath	Team
Bronze medal – third place	2024 Zhengzhou	Individual
Asian Games
Gold medal – first place	2018 Jakarta	Individual
Gold medal – first place	2022 Hangzhou	Individual
Gold medal – first place	2022 Hangzhou	Team
Gold medal – first place	2026 Nagoya	Team
Silver medal – second place	2026 Nagooya	Individual

Jun Woong-tae (Korean: 전웅태; born 1 August 1995) is a South Korean modern pentathlete.

== Sports career ==
The athlete from Seoul was the first Korean player to win a ticket to the 2020 Tokyo Olympics after a series of victories, including winning the UIPM World Cup in 2018, winning a gold medal at the Asian Games in Jakarta and Palembang in the same year, and a bronze medal in the individual event at the World Championships in 2019. Woongtae also competed at the 2016 Summer Olympics in Rio de Janeiro, in the men's event, achieving 19th place.

Woongtae started out as a swimmer, before being encouraged by one of his teachers at the Seoul Sports Middle School to pursue modern pentathlon. He trained and mastered the five disciplines of the sport with the support of his school, the Gwangju City Hall and the Korean Modern Pentathlon Federation, as well as the unequivocal support from his parents.

As of July 21, 2021, Woongtae Jun is 4th in the UIPM Senior Global World Championships Ranking and 1st in the UIPM Senior World Cup Ranking, making him one of the sports' most promising medal prospects for the 2020 Tokyo Olympic Games

When reflecting on his performance during the 2016 Rio Olympics, Woongtae candidly spoke of his inexperience at the time and spoke of his commitment to train harder and prepare more, with hopes of being selected to represent South Korea and win a medal at the Tokyo 2020 Summer Olympics.

"I will definitely win a medal at the Tokyo Olympics next year and make the modern pentathlon into the most important event in Korea."

At the 2020 Summer Olympics held in August 2021, Jun won the bronze medal in men's individual modern pentathlon, behind winner Joe Choong and silver medalist Ahmed El-Gendy. His bronze medal was the first Olympic medal from a competitor from South Korea in this sport.
