= Pavel Ilyashenko =

Kazakhstani modern pentathlete

Pavel Iliashenko
Personal information
- Full name: Pavel Alexandrovich Iliashenko
- Nationality: Kazakhstan
- Born: 23 June 1990 (age 36) Ufa, Russian SFSR, Soviet Union
- Height: 1.81 m (5 ft 11 1/2 in)
- Weight: 75 kg (165 lb)

Sport
- Sport: Modern pentathlon
- Coached by: Vadim Chudnovsky

Pavel Alexandrovich Iliashenko (Russian: Павел Александрович Ильяшенко; born 23 June 1990 in Ufa, Russian SFSR, Soviet Union) is a modern pentathlete from Kazakhstan. He competed at the 2012 Summer Olympics in London, where he finished twenty-ninth in the men's event, with a score of 5,432 points. At the 2016 Summer Olympics, he finished in 35th place.

Iliashenko also won a silver medal at the 2011 UIPM Junior World Championships in Buenos Aires, Argentina.

He competed in the men's individual event at the 2018 Asian Games held in Jakarta, Indonesia.

He represented Kazakhstan at the 2020 Summer Olympics.
