= Taishu Sato =

Japanese modern pentathlete

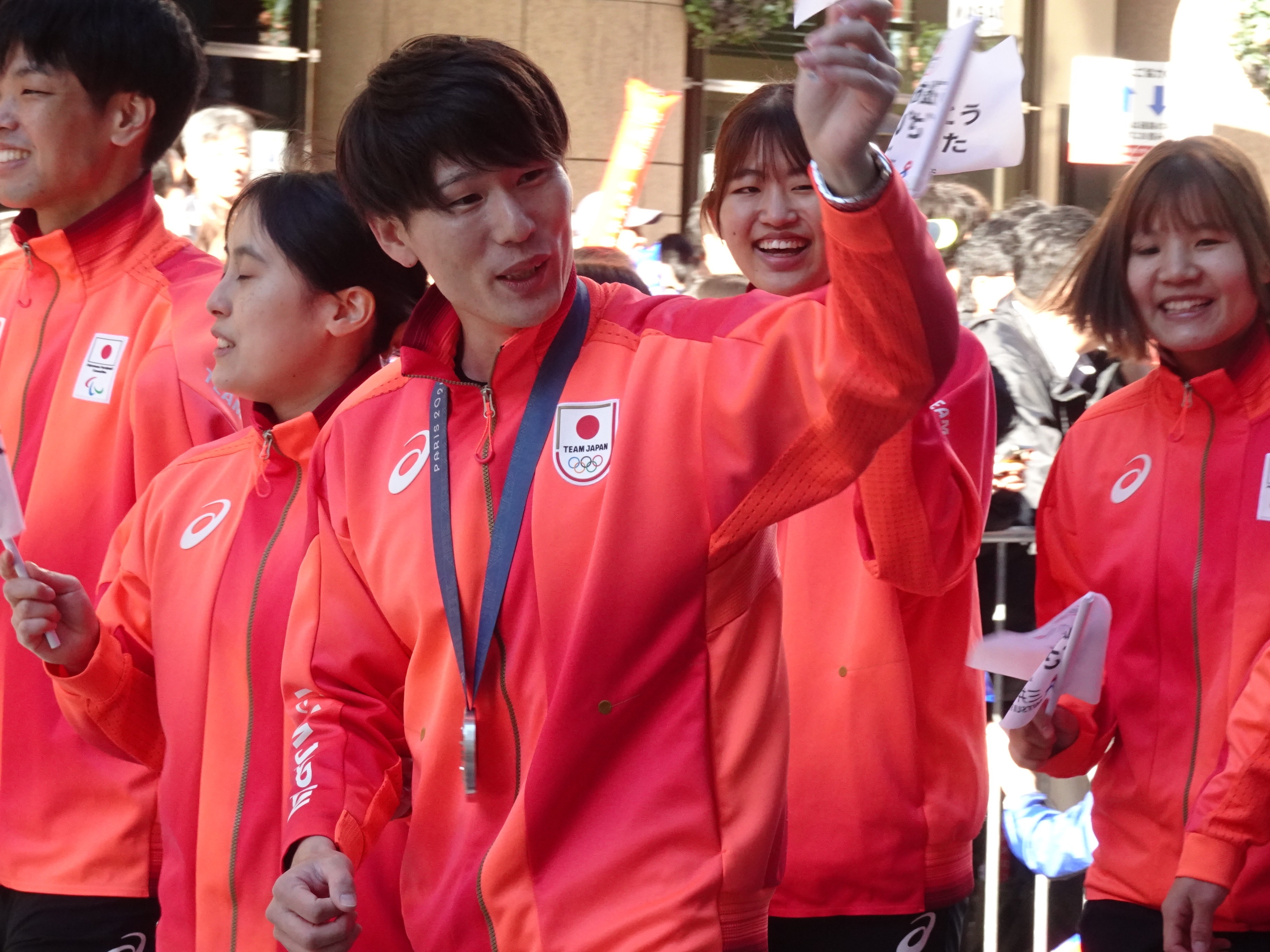
- Sato (center) at Paris 2024 Summer Olympians and Paralympians Japan National Team parade event on November 30th, 2024

Personal information
- Born: 20 October 1993 (age 33)

Sport
- Country: Japan
- Sport: Modern pentathlon
Medal record
Men's modern pentathlon
Representing Japan
Olympic Games
Silver medal – second place	2024 Paris	Individual
Asian Games
Bronze medal – third place	2022 Hangzhou	Team

Taishu Sato (Japanese: 佐藤 大宗, romanized: Satō Taishū, born 20 October 1993) is a Japanese modern pentathlete. He was a bronze medalist at the 2022 Asian Games and a silver medalist at the 2024 Summer Olympics.

== Career ==
He became Japanese national champion for the first time in 2021, scoring a tally of 1459 points.

During the 2022 Pentathlon World Cup event in Budapest, Sato publicly protested the removal of the equestrian element in future modern pentathlon events by wearing a T-shirt at the fencing element of the competition with the slogan "Save Riding and Change The Rules”. He won silver at the World Cup Final in the mixed relay in 2022.

He was a bronze medalist in the men’s team event at the 2022 Asian Games in Hangzhou. At the Games he finished in sixth place in the individual event. He came in second place in the 2023 Modern Pentathlon World Cup leg in Sofia, Bulgaria.

He competed at the 2024 Summer Olympics in Paris and qualified first from his group for the final.
