= Phurit Yohuang =

Thai modern pentathlete (born 2003)

Personal information
- Native name: ภูริช โยเฮือง
- Born: March 20, 2003 (age 23) Phetchabun, Thailand
- Height: 1.78 m (5 ft 10 in)
- Weight: 67 kg (148 lb)

Sport
- Sport: Modern pentathlon
Medal record
Southeast Asian Games
Bronze medal – third place	2019 Southeast Asian Games	Laser-Run team

Phurit Yohuang (Thai: ภูริช โยเฮือง; born 20 March 2003) is a Thai modern pentathlete. He represented Thailand at the 2024 Summer Olympics in Paris. He is the first Thai person to be competed in the modern pentathlon at the Olympic Games.

Phurit finished highschool in Plutaluangwittaya School. Phurit started competing in 2018. He won a bronze medal in the laser-run team event at the 2019 Southeast Asian Games. At the 2022 Asian Games in Hangzhou, he finished 11th in the men's individual event. In 2024, he got qualified for the 2024 Summer Olympics. He placed 34th in the men's modern pentathlon semi-finals.

== Personal life ==
Phurit finished highschool in Plutaluangwittaya School. In 2021, he got qualified for the Royal Thai Naval Academy. After two years of training, he graduated and was named as a 3rd Class Officer. He currently holds the rank of 2nd Class Officer.
