= Luo Shuai =

Chinese modern pentathlete

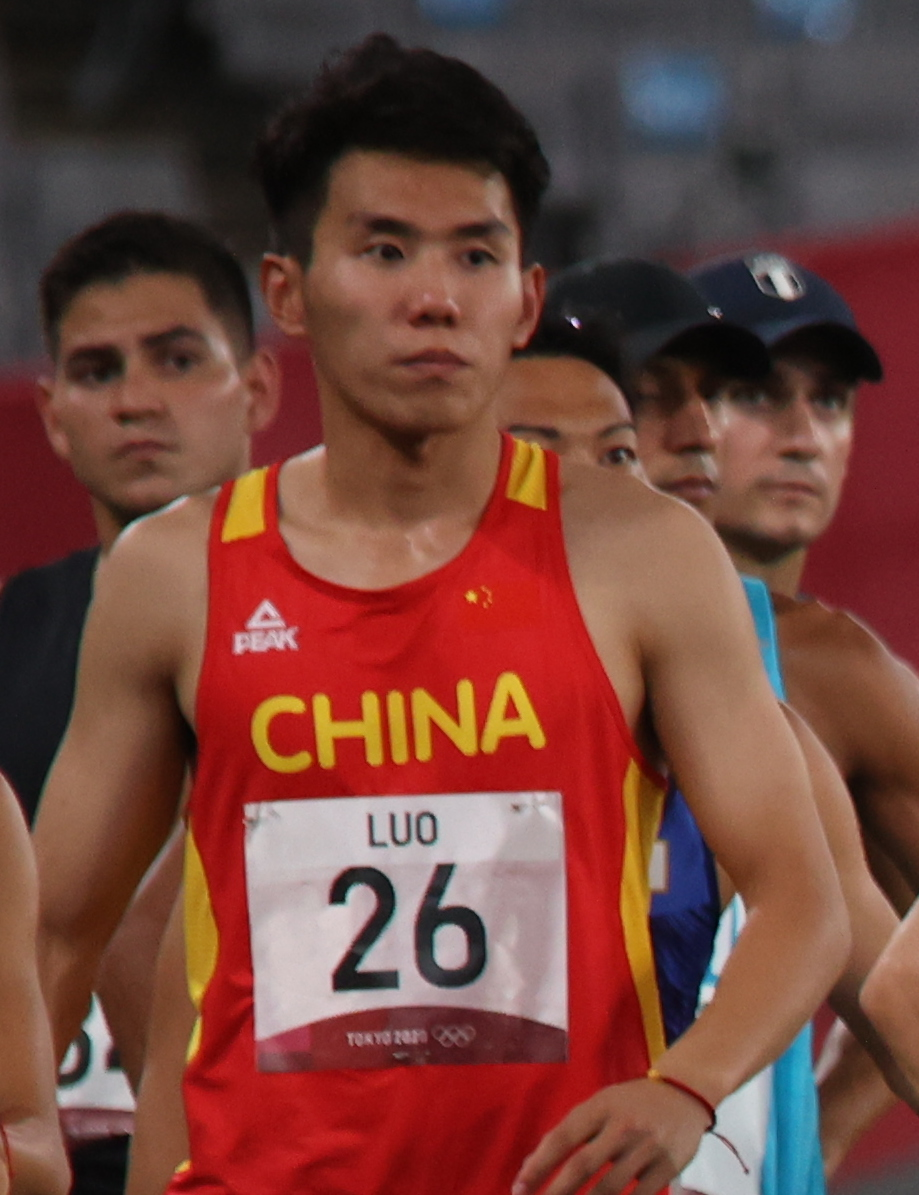
- Luo Shuai at the 2020 Summer Olympic Games

Personal information
- Born: 16 April 1997 (age 29)

Sport
- Country: China
- Sport: Modern pentathlon
Medal record
Representing China
Men's modern pentathlon
Asian Games
Bronze medal – third place	2018 Jakarta	Individual
Men's laser-run
World Championships
Gold medal – first place	2024 Zhengzhou	Individual
Gold medal – first place	2024 Zhengzhou	Team
Bronze medal – third place	2023 Bath	Individual

Luo Shuai (simplified Chinese: 罗帅; traditional Chinese: 羅帥; pinyin: Luó Shuài; born 16 April 1997) is a Chinese modern pentathlete. He won the bronze medal in the men's event at the 2018 Asian Games held in Jakarta, Indonesia.

He qualified to represent China at the 2020 Summer Olympics in Tokyo, Japan after winning the silver medal in the men's individual event at the 2019 Asia/Oceania Championships & Olympic Qualifier.
