= Seo Chang-wan =

South Korean modern pentathlete

- Seo Chang-wan in 2026

Personal information
- Born: 14 March 1997 (age 29)

Sport
- Country: South Korea
- Sport: Modern pentathlon
Medal record
Men's modern pentathlon
Representing South Korea
World Championships
Gold medal – first place	2024 Zhengzhou	Relay
Gold medal – first place	2026 Guiyang	Mixed relay
Silver medal – second place	2024 Zhengzhou	Team
Bronze medal – third place	2023 Bath	Relay
Bronze medal – third place	2026 Guiyang	Individual
World Relay Championships
Bronze medal – third place	2025 Alexandria	Mixed relay

Seo Chang-wan (born 14 March 1997) is a South Korean modern pentathlete.

== Career ==
He won a bronze medal in the relay at the 2023 World Modern Pentathlon Championships in Bath, England.

In April 2024, he won the UIPM World Cup in Ankara. He won a silver medal at the 2024 World Modern Pentathlon Championships in the team event, and also won a gold medal in the relay. He competed at the 2024 Summer Olympics in Paris.

In August 2026, he won the bronze medal in the individual competition, and a gold medal in the mixed relay alongside Seong Seung-min, at the 2026 World Modern Pentathlon Championships in China.
