= Javelin throw at the Olympics =

Javelin throw at the Olympic Games
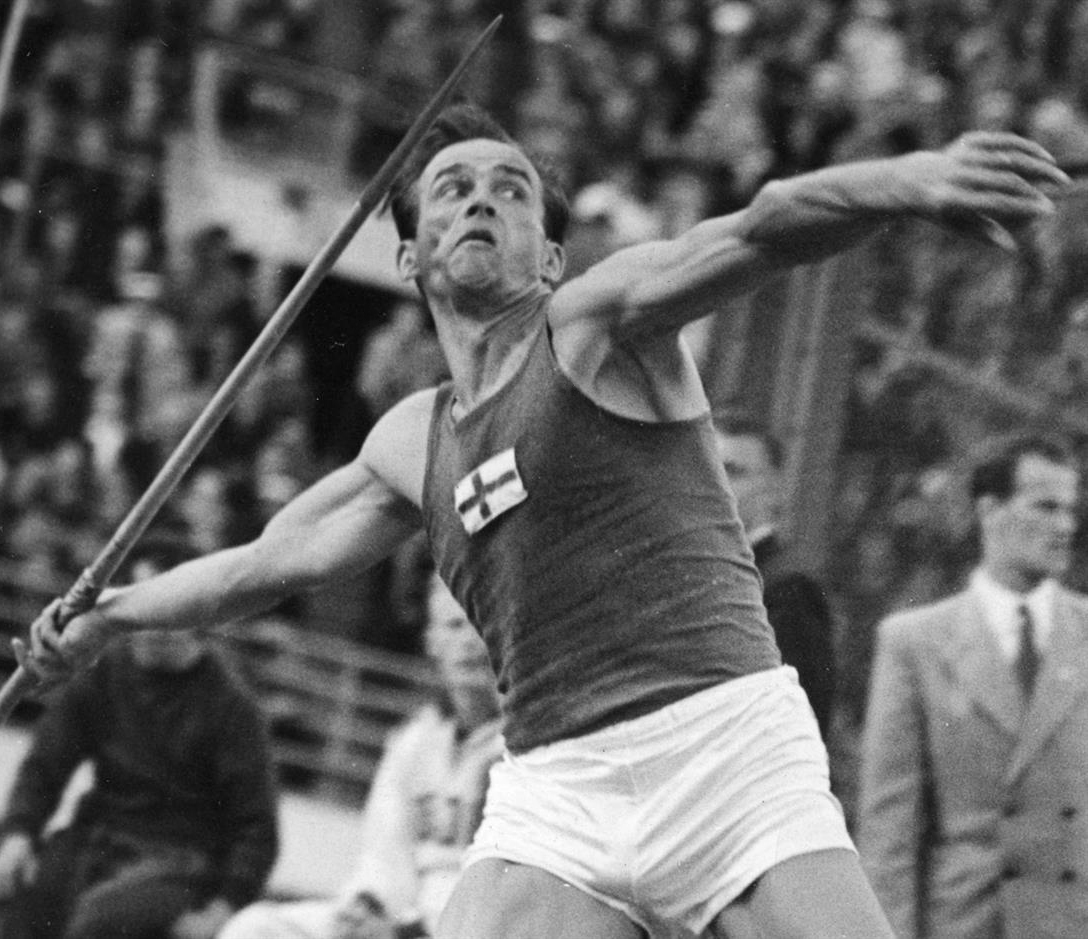
- The 1948 javelin throw competition, Tapio Rautavaara (FIN)

Overview
- Sport: Athletics
- Gender: Men and women
- Years held: Men: 1908–2024; Women: 1932–2024

Olympic record
- Men: 92.97 m Arshad Nadeem (2024)
- Women: 71.53 m Osleidys Menéndez (2004)

Reigning champion
- Men: Arshad Nadeem (PAK)
- Women: Haruka Kitaguchi (JPN)

The javelin throw at the Summer Olympics is one of four track and field throwing events held at the multi-sport event. The men's javelin throw has been present on the Olympic athletics programme since 1908, being the last of the current throwing events to feature at the Olympics after the shot put, discus throw and hammer throw. The women's event was first contested at the 1932 Olympics, becoming the second women's throws event after the discus in 1928.

Two variants of the javelin have featured on the Olympic programme: a freestyle version was first contested at the 1906 Intercalated Games and then again the 1908 London Olympics. A one-off two-handed version was held at the 1912 Stockholm Olympics.

== Medalists ==
=== Men ===
Games	Gold	Silver	Bronze
1908 London	Eric Lemming; Sweden	Arne Halse; Norway	Otto Nilsson; Sweden
1912 Stockholm	Eric Lemming; Sweden	Julius Saaristo; Finland	Mór Kóczán; Hungary
1920 Antwerp	Jonni Myyrä; Finland	Urho Peltonen; Finland	Pekka Johansson; Finland
1924 Paris	Jonni Myyrä; Finland	Gunnar Lindström; Sweden	Eugene Oberst; United States
1928 Amsterdam	Erik Lundqvist; Sweden	Béla Szepes; Hungary	Olav Sunde; Norway
1932 Los Angeles	Matti Järvinen; Finland	Matti Sippala; Finland	Eino Penttilä; Finland
1936 Berlin	Gerhard Stöck; Germany	Yrjö Nikkanen; Finland	Kalervo Toivonen; Finland
1948 London	Tapio Rautavaara; Finland	Steve Seymour; United States	József Várszegi; Hungary
1952 Helsinki	Cy Young; United States	Bill Miller; United States	Toivo Hyytiäinen; Finland
1956 Melbourne	Egil Danielsen; Norway	Janusz Sidło; Poland	Viktor Tsybulenko; Soviet Union
1960 Rome	Viktor Tsybulenko; Soviet Union	Walter Krüger; United Team of Germany	Gergely Kulcsár; Hungary
1964 Tokyo	Pauli Nevala; Finland	Gergely Kulcsár; Hungary	Jānis Lūsis; Soviet Union
1968 Mexico City	Jānis Lūsis; Soviet Union	Jorma Kinnunen; Finland	Gergely Kulcsár; Hungary
1972 Munich	Klaus Wolfermann; West Germany	Jānis Lūsis; Soviet Union	Bill Schmidt; United States
1976 Montreal	Miklós Németh; Hungary	Hannu Siitonen; Finland	Gheorghe Megelea; Romania
1980 Moscow	Dainis Kūla; Soviet Union	Aleksandr Makarov; Soviet Union	Wolfgang Hanisch; East Germany
1984 Los Angeles	Arto Härkönen; Finland	David Ottley; Great Britain	Kenth Eldebrink; Sweden
1988 Seoul	Tapio Korjus; Finland	Jan Železný; Czechoslovakia	Seppo Räty; Finland
1992 Barcelona	Jan Železný; Czechoslovakia	Seppo Räty; Finland	Steve Backley; Great Britain
1996 Atlanta	Jan Železný; Czech Republic	Steve Backley; Great Britain	Seppo Räty; Finland
2000 Sydney	Jan Železný; Czech Republic	Steve Backley; Great Britain	Sergey Makarov; Russia
2004 Athens	Andreas Thorkildsen; Norway	Vadims Vasiļevskis; Latvia	Sergey Makarov; Russia
2008 Beijing	Andreas Thorkildsen; Norway	Ainārs Kovals; Latvia	Tero Pitkämäki; Finland
2012 London	Keshorn Walcott; Trinidad and Tobago	Antti Ruuskanen; Finland	Vítězslav Veselý; Czech Republic
2016 Rio de Janeiro	Thomas Röhler; Germany	Julius Yego; Kenya	Keshorn Walcott; Trinidad and Tobago
2020 Tokyo	Neeraj Chopra; India	Jakub Vadlejch; Czech Republic	Vítězslav Veselý; Czech Republic
2024 Paris	Arshad Nadeem; Pakistan	Neeraj Chopra; India	Anderson Peters; Grenada

==== Multiple medalists ====
Rank	Athlete	Nation	Olympics	Gold	Silver	Bronze	Total
1	Jan Železný	Czechoslovakia; Czech Republic	1988–2000	3	1	0	4
2	Eric Lemming	Sweden	1908–1912	2	0	0	2
2	Jonni Myyrä	Finland	1920–1924	2	0	0	2
2	Andreas Thorkildsen	Norway	2004–2008	2	0	0	2
5	Jānis Lūsis	Soviet Union	1964–1972	1	1	1	3
6	Neeraj Chopra	India	2020–2024	1	1	0	2
7	Viktor Tsybulenko	Soviet Union	1956–1960	1	0	1	2
7	Keshorn Walcott	Trinidad and Tobago	2012–2016	1	0	1	2
9	Steve Backley	Great Britain	1992–2000	0	2	1	3
10	Gergely Kulcsar	Hungary	1960–1968	0	1	2	3
10	Seppo Räty	Finland	1988–1996	0	1	2	3
12	Sergey Makarov	Russia	2000–2004	0	0	2	2
13	Vítězslav Veselý	Czech Republic	2012–2020	0	0	2	2

==== Medals by country ====
Rank	Nation	Gold	Silver	Bronze	Total
1	Finland	7	8	7	22
2	Soviet Union	3	2	2	7
3	Sweden	3	1	2	6
4	Norway	3	1	1	5
5	Czech Republic	2	1	2	5
6	Germany	2	0	0	2
7	Hungary	1	2	4	7
8	United States	1	2	2	5
9	Czechoslovakia	1	1	0	2
9	India	1	1	0	2
11	Trinidad and Tobago	1	0	1	2
12	Pakistan	1	0	0	1
12	West Germany	1	0	0	1
14	Great Britain	0	3	1	4
15	Latvia	0	2	0	2
16	Kenya	0	1	0	1
16	Poland	0	1	0	1
16	United Team of Germany	0	1	0	1
19	Russia	0	0	2	2
20	East Germany	0	0	1	1
20	Grenada	0	0	1	1
20	Romania	0	0	1	1
Totals (22 entries)		27	27	27	81

=== Women ===
Games	Gold	Silver	Bronze
1932 Los Angeles	Babe Didrikson; United States	Ellen Braumüller; Germany	Tilly Fleischer; Germany
1936 Berlin	Tilly Fleischer; Germany	Luise Krüger; Germany	Maria Kwaśniewska; Poland
1948 London	Herma Bauma; Austria	Kaisa Parviainen; Finland	Lily Carlstedt; Denmark
1952 Helsinki	Dana Zátopková; Czechoslovakia	Aleksandra Chudina; Soviet Union	Yelena Gorchakova; Soviet Union
1956 Melbourne	Inese Jaunzeme; Soviet Union	Marlene Ahrens; Chile	Nadezhda Konyayeva; Soviet Union
1960 Rome	Elvīra Ozoliņa; Soviet Union	Dana Zátopková; Czechoslovakia	Birutė Kalėdienė; Soviet Union
1964 Tokyo	Mihaela Peneș; Romania	Márta Rudas; Hungary	Yelena Gorchakova; Soviet Union
1968 Mexico City	Angéla Németh; Hungary	Mihaela Peneș; Romania	Eva Janko; Austria
1972 Munich	Ruth Fuchs; East Germany	Jacqueline Todten; East Germany	Kate Schmidt; United States
1976 Montreal	Ruth Fuchs; East Germany	Marion Becker; West Germany	Kate Schmidt; United States
1980 Moscow	María Caridad Colón; Cuba	Saida Gunba; Soviet Union	Ute Hommola; East Germany
1984 Los Angeles	Tessa Sanderson; Great Britain	Tiina Lillak; Finland	Fatima Whitbread; Great Britain
1988 Seoul	Petra Felke; East Germany	Fatima Whitbread; Great Britain	Beate Koch; East Germany
1992 Barcelona	Silke Renk; Germany	Natalya Shikolenko; Unified Team	Karen Forkel; Germany
1996 Atlanta	Heli Rantanen; Finland	Louise McPaul; Australia	Trine Hattestad; Norway
2000 Sydney	Trine Hattestad; Norway	Mirela Maniani-Tzelili; Greece	Osleidys Menéndez; Cuba
2004 Athens	Osleidys Menéndez; Cuba	Steffi Nerius; Germany	Mirela Maniani; Greece
2008 Beijing	Barbora Špotáková; Czech Republic	Christina Obergföll; Germany	Goldie Sayers; Great Britain
2012 London	Barbora Špotáková; Czech Republic	Christina Obergföll; Germany	Linda Stahl; Germany
2016 Rio de Janeiro	Sara Kolak; Croatia	Sunette Viljoen; South Africa	Barbora Špotáková; Czech Republic
2020 Tokyo	Liu Shiying; China	Maria Andrejczyk; Poland	Kelsey-Lee Barber; Australia
2024 Paris	Haruka Kitaguchi; Japan	Jo-Ane van Dyk; South Africa	Nikola Ogrodníková; Czech Republic

==== Multiple medalists ====
Rank	Athlete	Nation	Olympics	Gold	Silver	Bronze	Total
1	Barbora Špotáková	Czech Republic	2008–2016	2	0	1	3
2	Ruth Fuchs	East Germany	1972–1976	2	0	0	2
3	Dana Zátopková	Czechoslovakia	1952–1960	1	1	0	2
3	Mihaela Peneş	Romania	1964–1968	1	1	0	2
5	Tilly Fleischer	Germany	1932–1936	1	0	1	2
5	Trine Hattestad	Norway	1996–2000	1	0	1	2
5	Osleidys Menéndez	Cuba	2000–2004	1	0	1	2
8	Fatima Whitbread	Great Britain	1984–1988	0	1	1	2
8	Mirela Maniani	Greece	2000–2004	0	1	1	2
8	Christina Obergföll	Germany	2008–2012	0	1	1	2
11	Yelena Gorchakova	Soviet Union	1952–1964	0	0	2	2
11	Kate Schmidt	United States	1972–1976	0	0	2	2

==== Medals by country ====
Rank	Nation	Gold	Silver	Bronze	Total
1	East Germany	3	1	2	6
2	Germany	2	4	4	10
3	Soviet Union	2	2	4	8
4	Cuba	2	0	1	3
4	Czech Republic	2	0	1	3
6	Finland	1	2	0	3
7	Great Britain	1	1	2	4
8	Czechoslovakia	1	1	0	2
8	Hungary	1	1	0	2
8	Romania	1	1	0	2
11	United States	1	0	2	3
12	Austria	1	0	1	2
12	Norway	1	0	1	2
14	China	1	0	0	1
14	Croatia	1	0	0	1
16	Greece	0	1	1	2
16	Poland	0	1	1	2
18	Australia	0	1	0	1
18	Chile	0	1	0	1
18	Russia	0	1	0	1
18	South Africa	0	1	0	1
18	Unified Team	0	1	0	1
18	West Germany	0	1	0	1
24	Denmark	0	0	1	1
Totals (24 entries)		21	21	21	63

== Intercalated Games ==
The 1906 Intercalated Games were held in Athens and at the time were officially recognised as part of the Olympic Games series, with the intention being to hold a games in Greece in two-year intervals between the internationally held Olympics. However, this plan never came to fruition and the International Olympic Committee (IOC) later decided not to recognise these games as part of the official Olympic series. Some sports historians continue to treat the results of these games as part of the Olympic canon.

A men's freestyle javelin event was contested at the 1906 Games – the first time the javelin featured on the Olympic programme. The competition was dominated by Swedish athletes, who took the first four places. Eric Lemming was a comfortable winner by a margin of over eight metres and he would go on to win the first two Olympic titles proper in 1908 and 1912. A 100 metres finalist, Knut Lindberg, was the silver medallist, while the third placer, Bruno Söderström, also won a pole vault medal that year.

Games	Gold	Silver	Bronze
1906 Athens	Eric Lemming (SWE)	Knut Lindberg (SWE)	Bruno Söderström (SWE)

== Variants ==
=== 1908 freestyle javelin throw ===
Following the freestyle javelin contest at the 1906 Intercalated Games, the event was continued at the 1908 London Olympics in spite of the addition of the standard style javelin as well. Eric Lemming won his second freestyle title, and his first officially recognised Olympics gold, and also won the standard style event as well. The freestyle event was dropped after 1908.

Games	Gold	Silver	Bronze
1908 London	Eric Lemming (SWE)	Mikhail Dorizas (GRE)	Arne Halse (NOR)

=== Two-handed javelin throw ===
At the 1912 Stockholm Olympics a two-handed variant of the standard javelin throw competition took place. Each athlete had three attempts using each hand and their score was calculated by adding their best performances for the left and right hands. It featured two rounds, with the top three after the first round receiving a further three attempts with each arm.

Finnish athletes completed a podium sweep as Julius Saaristo, the runner-up in the 1912 standard javelin event, took the gold medal. Eric Lemming, champion in the one-handed event, performed poorly with his left hand and finished in fourth place.

Games	Gold	Silver	Bronze
1912 Stockholm	Julius Saaristo (FIN)	Väinö Siikaniemi (FIN)	Urho Peltonen (FIN)
