= Men's javelin throw Italian record progression =

The Italian record progression men's javelin throw is recognised by the Italian Athletics Federation (FIDAL).

== Record progression ==
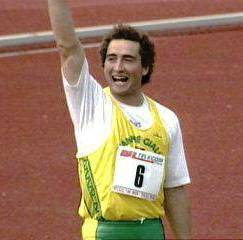
Carlo Sonego current Italian recordman.

Breaking down barriers

Record	Athlete	Club	Venue	Date
38.56	Ubaldo Bianchi	(Libertas Pistoia)	(Italy) Milan	21 September 1913
41.46	Oprando Bottura	(Virtus Bologna)	(Italy) Milan	25 July 1915
43.78	Oprando Bottura	(Virtus Bologna)	(Italy) Busto Arsizio	28 March 1920
43.97	Oprando Bottura	(Virtus Bologna)	(Italy) Milan	4 July 1920
45.90	Oprando Bottura	(Virtus Bologna)	(Italy) Milan	25 July 1920
46.73	Pietro Recchi	(US Anconetana)	(Italy) Ancona	12 September 1920
47.43	Oprando Bottura	(Virtus Bologna)	(Italy) Bologna	27 October 1920
51.96	Carlo Clemente	(Amsicora Cagliari)	(Italy) Bologna	18 September 1921
55.70	Carlo Clemente	(Josto Sassari)	(Italy) Busto Arsizio	17 September 1922
55.78	Raniero Laghi	(Forti e Liberi)	(Italy) Milan	16 September 1923
56.80	Carlo Clemente	(Torres Sassari)	(Italy) Busto Arsizio	29 June 1924
57.31	Alberto Dominutti	(Finanza Rovigo)	(Italy) Bologna	20 September 1926
58.08	Alberto Dominutti	(Bentegodi Verona)	(Greece) Athens	22 May 1927
59.68	Giuseppe Palmieri	(Virtus Bologna)	(Italy) Bologna	7 October 1928
59.92	Alberto Dominutti	(Bentegodi Verona)	(Italy) Bologna	22 June 1930
61.59	Alberto Dominutti	(Bentegodi Verona)	(United Kingdom) London	5 July 1930
62.34	Luigi Spazzali	(Unione Ginnastica Goriziana)	(Italy) Turin	16 June 1935
62.39	Mario Agosti	(Associazione Sportiva Udinese)	(Austria) Vienna	6 October 1935
65.23	Mario Agosti	(Associazione Sportiva Udinese)	(Italy) Udine	3 November 1935
65.94	Amos Matteucci	(Cus Roma)	(Italy) Milan	16 September 1950
66.33	Francesco Ziggiotti	(Cral Marzotto Valdagno)	(Italy) Milan	18 July 1954
66.73	Francesco Ziggiotti	(Cral Marzotto Valdagno)	(Italy) Merano	12 September 1954
68.02	Francesco Ziggiotti	(Cral Marzotto Valdagno)	(Italy) Schio	10 October 1954
68.75	Francesco Ziggiotti	(Cral Marzotto Valdagno)	(Italy) Bari	23 October 1954
69.57	Raffaele Bonaiuto	(Edera Forlì)	(Italy) Forlì	22 October 1955
70.14	Raffaele Bonaiuto	(Edera Forlì)	(Italy) Bologna	24 June 1956
71.00	Giovanni Lievore	(Fiamme Oro)	(Italy) Padua	30 August 1956
73.76	Giovanni Lievore	(Fiamme Oro)	(Italy) Rome	30 September 1956
74.00	Carlo Lievore	(Fiamme Oro)	(Italy) Bologna	15 September 1957
74.03	Giovanni Lievore	(Fiamme Oro)	(Italy) Padua	27 April 1958
74.98	Carlo Lievore	(Fiamme Oro)	(Italy) Padua	27 April 1958
78.83	Giovanni Lievore	(Fiamme Oro)	(Italy) Padua	27 April 1958
79.98	Carlo Lievore	(Fiamme Oro)	(Italy) Padua	27 April 1958
80.72	Giovanni Lievore	(Fiamme Oro)	(Italy) Rome	12 October 1958
81.14	Carlo Lievore	(Fiamme Oro)	(Soviet Union) Moscow	3 July 1960
83.60	Carlo Lievore	(Fiamme Oro)	(Italy) Schio	31 July 1960
86.74	Carlo Lievore	(Fiat Torino)	(Italy) Milan	1 June 1961
89.12	Agostino Ghesini	(Pro Patria)	(Italy) Ravenna	9 June 1983
tool effective from 1 April 1986
73.50	Fabio De Gaspari	(Fiamme Oro)	(France) Paris	31 May 1986
76.06	Fabio De Gaspari	(Fiamme Oro)	(Monaco) Montecarlo	6 July 1986
77.04	Fabio De Gaspari	(Fiamme Oro)	(Italy) Turin	28 May 1987
78.72	Fabio De Gaspari	(Fiamme Oro)	(Italy) Cittadella	13 May 1987
79.30	Fabio De Gaspari	(Fiamme Oro)	(Italy) Cesenatico	26 July 1989
82.44	Carlo Sonego	(Fiamme Gialle)	(Italy) Tivoli	30 May 1998
84.60	Carlo Sonego	(Fiamme Gialle)	(Japan) Osaka	8 May 1999

== See also ==
- List of Italian records in athletics
- Men's javelin throw world record progression
