= Athletics at the 1928 Summer Olympics – Men's javelin throw =

Men's javelin throw at the Games of the IX Olympiad
- Venue: Olympic Stadium
- Date: August 2, 1928
- Competitors: 28 from 18 nations
- Winning distance: 66.60 m

Medalists
1st place, gold medalist(s)		Erik Lundqvist	Sweden
2nd place, silver medalist(s)		Béla Szepes	Hungary
3rd place, bronze medalist(s)		Olav Sunde	Norway

The men's javelin throw event was part of the track and field athletics programme at the 1928 Summer Olympics. The competition was held on Thursday, August 2, 1928. Twenty-eight javelin throwers from 18 nations competed.

== Records ==
These were the standing world and Olympic records (in metres) prior to the 1928 Summer Olympics.

World record	69.88	(Finland) Eino Penttilä	Viipuri (FIN)	October 1, 1927
Olympic record	65.78	(Finland) Jonni Myyrä	Antwerp (BEL)	August 15, 1920

Erik Lundqvist set a new Olympic record in the qualification with 66.60 metres.

== Results ==
The qualification started at 2 p.m. The best six throwers qualified for the final. The final was held on the same day and started at about 4.30 p.m.

Rank	Athlete	Nation	Qualification				Final			
Rank	Athlete	Nation	#1	#2	#3	Result	#4	#5	#6	Result
1st place, gold medalist(s)	Erik Lundqvist	Sweden	66.60 OR	58 (~)	60.5 (~)	66.60	61 (~)	61.58	54 (~)	66.60
2nd place, silver medalist(s)	Béla Szepes	Hungary	62.5 (~)	65.26	56 (~)	65.26	X	62.50	54 (~)	65.26
3rd place, bronze medalist(s)	Olav Sunde	Norway	62.5 (~)	63.97	63.8 (~)	63.97	X	59.50	55 (~)	63.97
4	Paavo Liettu	Finland	62 (~)	63.86	63.7 (~)	63.86	55 (~)	61 (~)	63.76	63.86
5	Bruno Schlokat	Germany	58 (~)	62 (~)	63.40	63.40	60 (~)	57.5 (~)	63.26	63.40
6	Eino Penttilä	Finland	56 (~)	63.20	62 (~)	63.20	58.35	56 (~)	X	63.20
7	Stan Lay	New Zealand	60.5 (~)	62.89	56 (~)	62.89	did not advance			
8	Johan Meimer	Estonia	58 (~)	61.46	X	61.46	did not advance			
9	Albert Lamppu	Finland	58.5 (~)	56 (~)	61.45	61.45	did not advance			
10	Arthur Sager	United States	60.50	58 (~)	58 (~)	60.50	did not advance			
11	Erich Stoschek	Germany	59.86	?	?	59.86	did not advance			
12	Doral Pilling	Canada	59.16			59.16	did not advance			
13	Kosaku Sumiyoshi	Japan	58 (~)	59.05	?	59.05	did not advance			
14	Gunnar Lindström	Sweden	X	58 (~)	58.69	58.69	did not advance			
15	Vilho Rinne	Finland	55 (~)	58.04	57 (~)	58.04	did not advance			
16	Lee Bartlett	United States	X	56 (~)	57.57	57.57	did not advance			
17	Creth Hines	United States	56 (~)	X	57.17	57.17	did not advance			
18	Jules Herremans	Belgium	56.33			56.33	did not advance			
19	Charles Harlow	United States	55.85			55.85	did not advance			
20	Georgios Zakharopoulos	Greece	55.50			55.50	did not advance			
21	George Weightman-Smith	South Africa	54.37			54.37	did not advance			
22	Gaston Étienne	Belgium	54.34			54.34	did not advance			
23	Vilim Messner	Yugoslavia	53.70			53.70	did not advance			
24	Emmanuel Degland	France	52.82			52.82	did not advance			
25	Jaap Knol	Netherlands	52.68			52.68	did not advance			
26	Viktoras Ražaitis	Lithuania	51.16			51.16	did not advance			
27	Otto Rottman	Romania	50.93			50.93	did not advance			
28	Joop van der Leij	Netherlands	46 (~)	47.73	?	47.73	did not advance			

== Sources ==
- Official Olympic Report
- Wudarski, Pawel (1999). "Wyniki Igrzysk Olimpijskich" (in Polish).
