= Athletics at the 1924 Summer Olympics – Men's javelin throw =

Men's javelin throw at the Games of the VIII Olympiad
- Venue: Stade Olympique Yves-du-Manoir
- Date: July 6, 1924
- Competitors: 29 from 15 nations

Medalists
1st place, gold medalist(s)		Jonni Myyrä; Finland
2nd place, silver medalist(s)		Gunnar Lindström; Sweden
3rd place, bronze medalist(s)		Eugene Oberst; United States

The men's javelin throw event was part of the track and field athletics programme at the 1924 Summer Olympics. The competition was held on Sunday, July 6, 1924. 29 javelin throwers from 15 nations competed.

== Records ==
These were the standing world and Olympic records (in metres) prior to the 1924 Summer Olympics.

World record	66.10	(Finland) Jonni Myyrä	Stockholm (SWE)	August 25, 1919
Olympic record	65.78	(Finland) Jonni Myyrä	Antwerp (BEL)	August 15, 1920

== Results ==
=== Qualification ===
The qualification started at about 3 p.m. The best six throwers, both groups counted together, qualified for the final. The throwing order is not available and not all throwing series are available.

Group 1

Place	Athlete	1.	2.	3.	Distance	Overall Rank	Qual.
1	Gunnar Lindström (SWE)	~59	~58	60.81	60.81	1	Q
2	Jonni Myyrä (FIN)	X (~52)	59.30	~56	59.30	2	Q
3	Eugene Oberst (USA)		~53	57.98	57.98	3	Q
4	Yrjö Ekqvist (FIN)		~56	56.15	56.15	5	Q
5	Lajos Csejthey (HUN)		54.86		54.86	9	
6	Lee Priester (USA)	54.51	~52		54.51	11	
7	Hugo Lilliér (SWE)	52.95	~51	~45	52.95	13	
8	Georgios Zacharopoulos (GRE)	51.17			51.17	15	
9	Willy Seewald (BRA)	49.39			49.39	18	
10	Taki N'Dio (FRA)	48.92			48.92	19	
11	Samba Ciré (FRA)	48.65			48.65	20	
12	Jock Dalrymple (GBR)	46.92			46.92	24	
13	Willi Moser (SUI)	46.80			46.80	25	
14	Sławosz Szydłowski (POL)	46.00			46.00	26	
—	Jiří Svoboda (TCH)				NM		

Group 2

Place	Athlete	1.	2.	3.	Distance	Overall Rank	Qual.
1	William Neufeld (USA)		56.96		56.96	4	Q
2	Erik Blomqvist (SWE)	X (~54)	~56	56.15	56.15	5	Q
3	Urho Peltonen (FIN)	X (~56)	X (~56)	55.67	55.67	7	
4	Paavo Johansson (FIN)	55.10			55.10	8	
5	Taka N'Gangué (FRA)	54.65			54.65	10	
6	Homer Welchel (USA)	52.98			52.98	12	
7	Carlo Clemente (ITA)	52.75			52.75	14	
8	Arvīds Ķibilds (LAT)	50.15			50.15	16	
9	Aleksander Klumberg (EST)	~50	~50	49.61	49.61	17	
10	Hans Wipf (SUI)	48.57			48.57	21	
11	Emmanuel Degland (FRA)	48.57			48.57	21	
12	Mór Kóczán (TCH)	48.39			48.39	23	
13	Henri Dauban de Silhouette (GBR)	44.70			44.70	27	
14	Victor Pickard (CAN)	44.69			44.69	28	

=== Final ===
The final was held on the same day and started at about 4.30 p.m.

Place	Athlete	Qual. Width	1.	2.	3.	Distance
1	Jonni Myyrä (FIN)	59.30	~60	62.96	~58	62.96
2	Gunnar Lindström (SWE)	60.81	~60	60.92		60.92
3	Eugene Oberst (USA)	57.98				58.35
4	Yrjö Ekqvist (FIN)	56.15	57.56			57.56
5	William Neufeld (USA)	56.96				56.96
6	Erik Blomqvist (SWE)	56.15				56.85

== Sources ==
- Olympic Report
- Wudarski, Pawel (1999). "Wyniki Igrzysk Olimpijskich" (in Polish).
