= Ardy =

== Given name ==
- Ardy Larong
- Ardy Mfundu (born 2003), Belgian professional footballer
- Ardy Wiranata
- Ardy Kassakhian
- Ardy Vydra (Otakar Vydra, 1901–1982), Czech athlete

== Surname ==
- Bartolommeo Ardy (1821–1887), Italian painter
- Wani Ardy

== See also ==
- Ardy the Aardvark
