= Eugene Oberst =

American sportsperson (1901–1991)

- Oberst pictured in The Calyx 1930, Washington and Lee yearbook

Biographical details
- Born: July 23, 1901; Owensboro, Kentucky, U.S.
- Died: May 30, 1991 (aged 89); Cleveland, Ohio, U.S.

Playing career

Football
- 1920: Notre Dame
- 1922–1923: Notre Dame

Track and field
- 1922–1924: Notre Dame
- Position: Tackle (football)

Coaching career (HC unless noted)

Football
- 1926–1927: Roman Catholic HS (PA)
- 1929–1930: Washington and Lee
- 1931–1932: Canisius
- 1936–1942: John Carroll (line)
- 1946: John Carroll

Basketball
- 1945–1946: John Carroll

Administrative career (AD unless noted)
- 1947–1951: John Carroll

Head coaching record
- Overall: 9–25–5 (college football); 15–3–1 (high school football); 4–11 (college basketball)
Medal record
Men's athletics
Representing the United States
Olympic Games
| Bronze medal – third place | 1924 Paris | Javelin throw |

Eugene G. Oberst (July 23, 1901 – May 30, 1991) was an American football player, track and field athlete, coach of football and basketball, and college athletics administrator. Oberst was born the youngest of eleven children. A native of Owensboro, Kentucky, he played football at the University of Notre Dame in the 1920s under coach Knute Rockne, and competed in track and field as a javelin thrower. He won the Olympic bronze medal at the 1924 Summer Games in Paris. Oberst served as the head football coach at Washington and Lee University (1929–1930), Canisius College (1931–1932), and John Carroll University (1946).

== Football career ==
Oberst, who was listed at 6 ft 5 in (1.96 m) and 203 pounds (92 kg), was a right tackle for the Notre Dame Fighting Irish in 1920, 1922, and 1923, wearing uniform No. 30, while missing the 1921 season due to injury. In 1922 and 1923, he was one of Notre Dame's "Seven Mules," the offensive linemen who blocked for the team's legendary Four Horsemen, before those terms were coined during Notre Dame's 1924 national championship season. Oberst's teammates also included halfback George Gipp.

== Javelin throw ==
As the possibly apocryphal story goes, Oberst was walking by a Notre Dame track and field practice one day when a javelin landed nearby. He picked it up and threw it far beyond the original thrower. Rockne, who coached track and field as well as football, saw the toss, and drafted Oberst on the spot. Oberst was the 1921 NCAA javelin champion, with a throw of 191 ft 2 in (58.27 m). At the 1924 Penn Relays, Oberst's throw of 196 ft 2 5/8 in (59.807 m) beat the meet record by more than 8 feet. Oberst had a disappointing performance at the U.S. Olympic Trials in Cambridge, Massachusetts, finishing in 5th place with a throw of 180 ft 3 in (54.94 m). The U.S. Olympic Committee added Oberst to the Olympic team, anyway, because of his better results at previous meets. The Olympic Trials winner, William Neufeld of UC Berkeley went on to finish 5th at the Olympics.

== Bronze Olympic medal ==
In Paris, Oberst's throw of 58.35 m won him the bronze medal, behind the defending Olympic champion, Jonni Myyrä of Finland (62.96 m) and Gunnar Lindström of Sweden (60.92 m). Oberst was the first American to win an Olympic medal in the javelin throw, and only seven Americans have medaled since, most notably Babe Didrikson at the 1932 Olympics in Los Angeles. Oberst was somewhat disappointed with his reception after returning with the medal and his niece noted few ever remarked on the accomplishment. She later told a reporter, "I don't think he was ever given the honor for winning an Olympic medal".

Oberst's Notre Dame football teammate Tom Lieb also made the 1924 U.S. Olympic team, in the discus throw, and won the bronze medal.

== Coaching career ==
After college, Oberst became a coach, teacher, and athletics administrator. In 1926 and 1927, his football teams at Roman Catholic High School won the championships of the Philadelphia Catholic League, with a combined record of 15–3–1. From 1929 to 1930, Oberst coached the Washington and Lee University Generals, compiling a 6–11–2 record. In 1931 and 1932, Oberst coached at Canisius College, where his record was 2–7–3.

Oberst later moved on to John Carroll College, now John Carroll University, where he finished his career. He was a football line coach for the Blue Streaks from 1936 to 1942. Oberst then served as director of the school's V-12 Navy training program from 1942 to 1946. He was head basketball coach during the 1945–46 season, with a 4–11 record, and head football coach in 1946, with a 1–7 record. Oberst also coached the school's track and field team from 1947 to 1948. Finally, Oberst served as John Carroll's athletic director from 1947 to 1951. During that time period, John Carroll's football halfback was future Hall of Famer Don Shula.

== Later years ==
In 1971, Oberst was inducted into John Carroll University's Athletic Hall of Fame. In 1976, he was inducted into the Greater Cleveland Sports Hall of Fame. Oberst died in Cleveland in 1991.

== Head coaching record ==
=== Football ===
| Year | Team | Overall | Conference | Standing | Bowl/playoffs |
|---|---|---|---|---|---|
Washington and Lee Generals (Southern Conference) (1929–1930)
| 1929 | Washington and Lee | 3–5–1 | 1–4–1 | 18th | |
| 1930 | Washington and Lee | 3–6–1 | 0–4–1 | 22nd | |
| Washington and Lee: | | 6–11–2 | 1–8–2 | | |
Canisius Golden Griffins (Western New York Little Three Conference) (1931–1932)
| 1931 | Canisius | 1–5–2 | 0–1–1 | 3rd | |
| 1932 | Canisius | 1–2–1 (Note: Oberst coached only the first four games of the season. Mike Traynor coached the final four games.) | 0–0 | | |
| Canisius: | | 2–7–3 | 0–1–1 | | |
John Carroll Blue Streaks (Ohio Athletic Conference) (1946)
| 1946 | John Carroll | 1–7 | 1–4 | T–16th | |
| John Carroll: | | 1–7 | 1–4 | | |
| Total: | | 9–25–5 | | | |
