= Athletics at the 1920 Summer Olympics – Men's javelin throw =

Men's javelin throw at the Games of the VII Olympiad
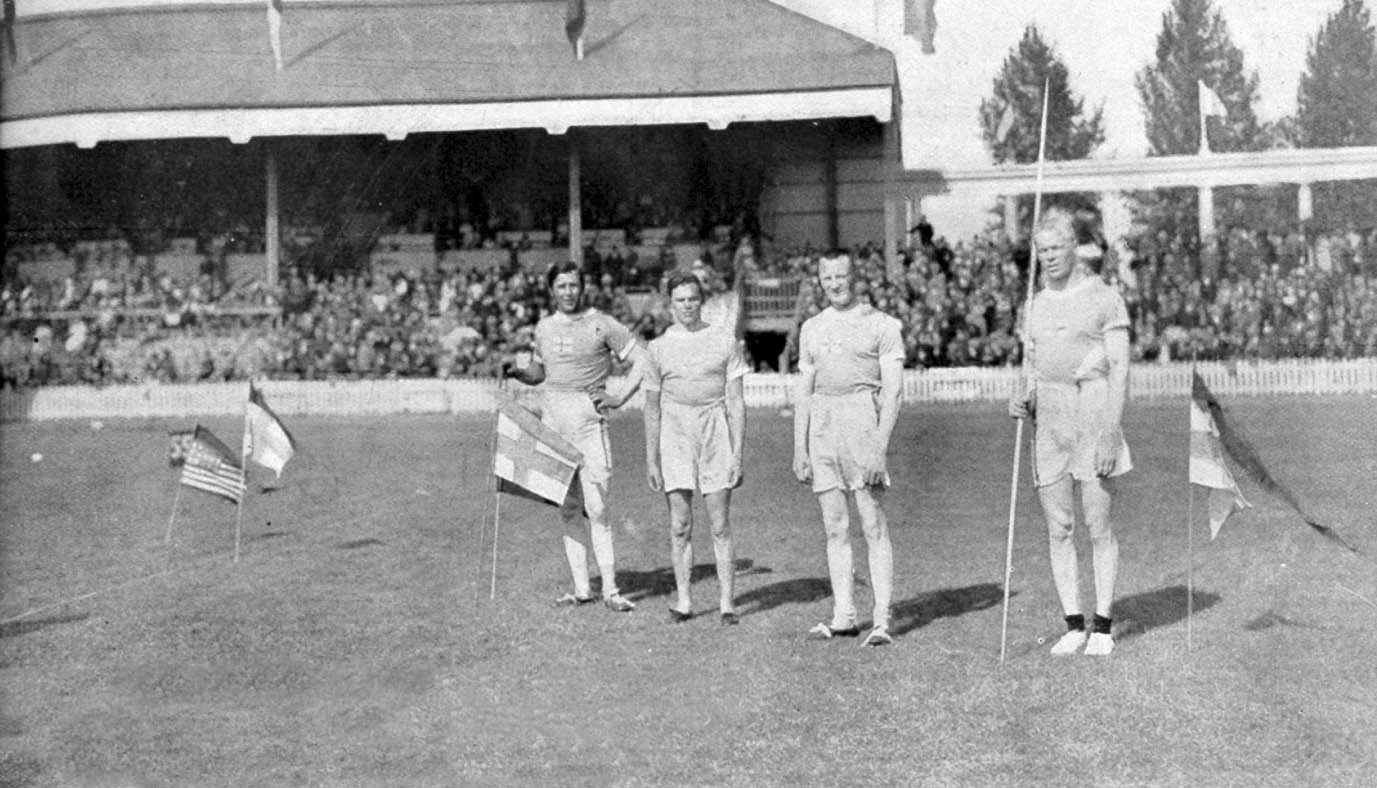
- Venue: Olympisch Stadion
- Date: August 15, 1920
- Competitors: 25 from 12 nations

Medalists
1st place, gold medalist(s)		Jonni Myyrä	Finland
2nd place, silver medalist(s)		Urho Peltonen	Finland
3rd place, bronze medalist(s)		Paavo Johansson	Finland

The men's javelin throw event was part of the track and field athletics programme at the 1920 Summer Olympics. The competition was held on Sunday, August 15, 1920. Twenty-five javelin throwers from twelve nations competed.

== Records ==
These were the standing world and Olympic records (in metres) prior to the 1920 Summer Olympics.

World record	66.10	(Finland) Jonni Myyrä	Stockholm (SWE)	August 25, 1919
Olympic record	61.00	(Finland) Julius Saaristo	Stockholm (SWE)	July 9, 1912

At first Urho Peltonen set a new Olympic record in the qualification with 63.605 m. In the final Jonni Myyrä set the new Olympic record with 65.78 m.

== Results ==
The best ten javelin throwers qualified for the final.

Place	Athlete	Qual.		Final
Place	Athlete	Distance	Rank	Final
1	Jonni Myyrä (FIN)	60.63	3	65.78 OR
2	Urho Peltonen (FIN)	63.605 OR	1	63.605
3	Paavo Johansson (FIN)	63.095	2	63.095
4	Julius Saaristo (FIN)	60.045	5	62.395
5	Aleksander Klumberg (EST)	59.03	6	62.39
6	Gunnar Lindström (SWE)	60.52	4	60.52
7	Milton Angier (USA)	57.58	9	59.275
8	Erik Blomqvist (SWE)	58.18	7	58.18
9	James Lincoln (USA)	57.86	8	57.86
10	Hugo Lilliér (SWE)	56.77	10	56.77
11	Arthur Tuck (USA)	53.78		
12	Jack Mahan (USA)	53.52		
13	Elof Lindström (SWE)	51.53		
14	Simon Grany (FRA)	47.90		
15	Arthur Picard (FRA)	47.09		
16	Arturo Medina (CHI)	43.90		
17	Oprando Bottura (ITA)	42.70		
18	Adolphe Hauman (BEL)	42.58		
19	Frederik Petersen (DEN)	42.13		
20	Émile Muller (BEL)	40.24		
21	Alex Servais (LUX)	40.08		
22	Jean Lefèbvre (BEL)	39.00		
23	Ignacio Izaguirre (ESP)	38.92		
24	Otakar Vydra (TCH)	37.75		
25	Arthur Delaender (BEL)	36.25		

== Sources ==
- Belgium Olympic Committee (1957). Olympic Games Antwerp 1920: Official Report (in French).
- Wudarski, Pawel (1999). "Wyniki Igrzysk Olimpijskich" (in Polish).
