= Athletics at the 1920 Summer Olympics – Men's discus throw =

Men's discus throw at the Games of the VII Olympiad
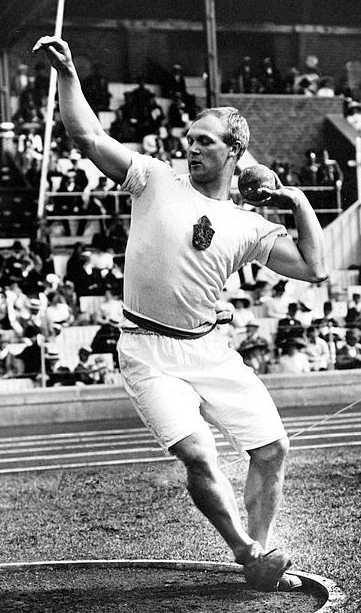
- Elmer Niklander (1912)
- Venue: Olympisch Stadion
- Dates: August 21–22, 1920
- Competitors: 17 from 8 nations
- Winning distance: 44.685

Medalists
1st place, gold medalist(s)		Elmer Niklander; Finland
2nd place, silver medalist(s)		Armas Taipale; Finland
3rd place, bronze medalist(s)		Gus Pope; United States

The men's discus throw event was part of the track and field athletics programme at the 1920 Summer Olympics. The competition was held on Saturday, August 21, 1920, and on Sunday, August 22, 1920. 17 discus throwers from eight nations competed. No nation had more than 4 athletes, suggesting the limit had been reduced from the 12 maximum in force in 1908 and 1912. The event was won by Elmer Niklander of Finland, the nation's second consecutive victory in the men's discus throw. Armas Taipale, the winner in 1912, took silver to become the second man to win multiple medals in the event. Gus Pope took bronze, continuing the American streak of podium appearances at all six discus competitions to date.

== Background ==
This was the sixth appearance of the event, which is one of 12 athletics events to have been held at every Summer Olympics. Returning competitors from 1912 included defending champion Armas Taipale and fourth-place finisher Elmer Niklander, both of Finland. Taipale had twice beaten the world record, though the IAAF did not acknowledge those throws.

Belgium and Czechoslovakia each made their debut in the men's discus throw. The United States made its sixth appearance, having competed in every edition of the Olympic men's discus throw to date. Greece missed the event for the first time.

== Competition format ==
The competition continued to use the single, divided-final format in use since 1896. Each athlete received three throws, with the top six receiving an additional three throws.

== Records ==
These were the standing world and Olympic records (in metres) prior to the 1920 Summer Olympics.

World record	James Duncan (USA)	47.58	New York, United States	27 May 1912
Olympic record	Armas Taipale (FIN)	45.21	Stockholm, Sweden	12 July 1912

No new world or Olympic records were set during the competition.

== Schedule ==
Date	Time	Round
Saturday, 21 August 1920	15:45	Qualifying
Sunday, 22 August 1920	10:00	Final

== Results ==
The best six discus throwers qualified for the final.

Rank	Athlete	Nation	Qualifying	Final	Distance
1st place, gold medalist(s)	Elmer Niklander	Finland	44.685	Unknown	44.685
2nd place, silver medalist(s)	Armas Taipale	Finland	44.19	Unknown	44.19
3rd place, bronze medalist(s)	Gus Pope	United States	42.13	Unknown	42.13
4	Oscar Zallhagen	Sweden	40.16	41.07	41.07
5	William Bartlett	United States	40.875	Unknown	40.875
6	Allan Eriksson	Sweden	39.41	Unknown	39.41
7	Valther Jensen	Denmark	38.23	Did not advance	38.23
8	Ville Pörhölä	Finland	38.19	Did not advance	38.19
9	Aurelio Lenzi	Italy	37.75	Did not advance	37.75
10	Kenneth Wilson	United States	37.58	Did not advance	37.58
11	André Tison	France	37.35	Did not advance	37.35
12	Jonni Myyrä	Finland	37.00	Did not advance	37.00
13	František Hoplíček	Czechoslovakia	36.75	Did not advance	36.75
14	Émile Ecuyer	France	36.10	Did not advance	36.10
15	Daniel Pierre	France	35.53	Did not advance	35.53
16	Arthur Delaender	Belgium	32.00	Did not advance	32.00
AC	Hans Granfelt	Sweden	Unknown	Did not advance	Unknown

== Sources ==
- Belgium Olympic Committee (1957). Olympic Games Antwerp 1920: Official Report (in French).
- Wudarski, Pawel (1999). "Wyniki Igrzysk Olimpijskich" (in Polish).
