= Lajos Csejthey =

Hungarian track and field athlete and physician

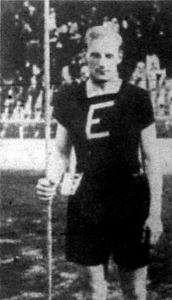

Personal information
- Full name: Lajos Csejthey
- Nationality: Hungarian
- Born: 14 February 1885 Dömötöri, Kingdom of Hungary, Austria-Hungary
- Died: 3 August 1977 (aged 82) Csorna, Hungary

Achievements and titles
- Personal best: Javelin throw – 61.22 m (1922)

Lajos Csejthey (Hungarian: [ˈlɒjoʃ ˈt͡ʃɛjtɛi]; 14 February 1895 – 3 August 1977) was a Hungarian physician and athlete, who competed in the javelin throw and the discus throw. A six time national champion of the javelin throw event, he became the first Hungarian to break the 60 metres barrier in 1922, and the first sportsman from Vas County to participate at the Olympic Games in 1924.

After the Olympics Csejthey moved to Vasvár and later to Csorna, concentrating on his civil life and work as a health officier and dentist. He died in 1977 and was buried in the Saint Anthony Cemetery in Csorna. His memory is preserved by a plaque in the memorial park in his hometown.

== Early life ==
He was born to a wealthy peasant family in Dömötöri, a small village in Vas County, Kingdom of Hungary, which together with other surrounding villages was united to form Sorkifalud in 1943. The fourth of five children of Viktor Csejthey and Rozália Németh, he had two older brothers, Viktor and Sámuel, an older sister Irma and a younger sister, Eszter. His father died in an accident in 1904, whereupon the eldest brother, Viktor, became the head of the household and managed the education of Lajos, sending him to the Medical University of Budapest.

== Athletics career ==
At the height of 1.98 metres (6 ft 6 in) Csejthey was reckoned a real giant of that time and his attributes allowed him to become a successful throwing athlete. Competing both in javelin throw and discus throw, a hereditary shoulder dislocation prevented him to fulfil his talent in the latter one, still he won several national and international competitions in that event.

In the javelin throw his first major success came in 1919 when he won the Hungarian Athletics Championships, which was followed by five more titles until 1924. In 1922 he set a new national record with a throw of 61.22 metres, making him the first Hungarian athlete to exceed the 60 metres limit. The record stood until 1927, when it was broken by Béla Szepes, a prominent figure of the late 1920s, who further improved the record to 66.70 in 1930.

Csejthey was present at the Olympic Games in Paris, participating in the javelin throw event. The first athlete from Vas County to take part at the Olympics, he came ninth in the qualifying round with a throw of 54.86 metres, about one metres short to the sixth and last qualifying place. Csejthey did not advance to the final and remained in the ninth final position.

Not much after the Olympics, in September 1924 Csejthey began his medical practice in Vasvár. As a result, his sporting career was played down and although he was yet included to the Hungarian athletics team preparing for the 1928 Summer Olympics, he could not make into the Olympic squad anymore.

== Later life and death ==
Arriving to Vasvár, Csejthey started to work as a dentist and health officer of the township. Known for this professional knowledge and commitment, Csejthey introduced and used lung screening for the first time in Vas County. It is also noted that he financed poor people who could not allow to buy medicines from his own wealth.

During the World War II, in 1941 he was relocated to Csorna where he also served as health officer. Following the structural reorganization he became the Chief Medical Officer of the National Public Health and Medical Officer Service in Csorna, where he stayed until his retirement. He died in 1977 and was buried in the Saint Anthony Cemetery in Csorna.

In 2007, on the 30th anniversary of Csejthey's death, a memorial plaque was inaugurated in the memorial park in Sorkifalud. The work of sculptor János Blaskó was revealed by multiple Olympic medalist javelin thrower Gergely Kulcsár.
