= Athletics at the 1920 Summer Olympics – Men's shot put =

Men's shot put at the Games of the VII Olympiad
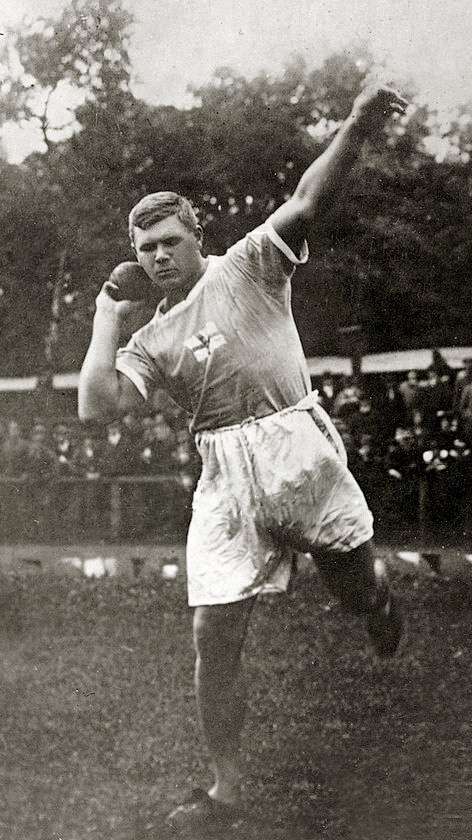
- Ville Pörhölä
- Venue: Olympisch Stadion
- Dates: August 17–18, 1920
- Competitors: 20 from 10 nations

Medalists
1st place, gold medalist(s)		Ville Pörhölä; Finland
2nd place, silver medalist(s)		Elmer Niklander; Finland
3rd place, bronze medalist(s)		Harry B. Liversedge; United States

The men's shot put event was part of the track and field athletics programme at the 1920 Summer Olympics. The competition was held on Tuesday, August 17, 1920, and on Wednesday, August 18, 1920. Twenty shot putters from ten nations competed. No nation had more than 4 athletes, suggesting the limit had been reduced from the 12 maximum in force in 1908 and 1912. The event was won by Ville Pörhölä of Finland, the first time the men's shot put was won by someone not from the United States. Fellow Finn Elmer Niklander took silver. The Americans, who had won all five previous editions of the shot put, including three medal sweeps, settled for bronze by Harry B. Liversedge.

== Background ==
This was the sixth appearance of the event, which is one of 12 athletics events to have been held at every Summer Olympics. Returning throwers from the pre-war 1912 Games were gold medalist Pat McDonald of the United States, fourth-place finisher Elmer Niklander of Finland, seventh-place finisher Einar Nilsson of Sweden, twelfth-place finisher Aurelio Lenzi of Italy, and sixteenth-place finisher Raoul Paoli of France. The great Ralph Rose, who had won in 1904 and 1908 and lost narrowly to McDonald in 1912, and was still the world record holder, had died of typhoid fever at the age of 28 in 1913. This left McDonald as the "likely favorite," until he injured his hand. Ville Pörhölä of Finland, who would have been a strong challenger for a healthy McDonald, was best positioned to win after that injury.

Belgium, Estonia, Spain, and Switzerland made their debut in the men's shot put. The United States appeared for the sixth time, the only nation to have competed in all Olympic shot put competitions to date. Greece, which had appeared all five previous times, was absent for the first time.

== Competition format ==
The competition continued to use the two-round format used in 1900 and since 1908, with results carrying over between rounds. The number of finalists expanded from three in previous Games to six in 1920. Each athlete received three throws in the qualifying round. The top six men advanced to the final, where they received an additional three throws. The best result, qualifying or final, counted.

== Records ==
These were the standing world and Olympic records (in metres) prior to the 1920 Summer Olympics.

World record	Ralph Rose (USA)	15.54	San Francisco, United States	21 August 1909
Olympic record	Pat McDonald (USA)	15.34	Stockholm, Sweden	10 July 1912

No new world or Olympic records were set during the competition.

== Schedule ==
Date	Time	Round
Tuesday, 17 August 1920	10:15	Qualifying
Wednesday, 18 August 1920	14:45	Final

== Results ==
The best six shot putters qualified for the final. Individual throw results for the qualifying round are not available.

Rank	Athlete	Nation	Qual.	4	5	6	Distance
1st place, gold medalist(s)	Ville Pörhölä	Finland	14.035	13.915	14.255	14.810	14.81
2nd place, silver medalist(s)	Elmer Niklander	Finland	14.155	13.500	14.080	X	14.155
3rd place, bronze medalist(s)	Harry Liversedge	United States	13.755	13.550	14.150	X	14.150
4	Pat McDonald	United States	14.080	13.500	14.080	X	14.080
5	Einar Nilsson	Sweden	13.735	13.440	13.870	X	13.87
6	Harald Tammer	Estonia	13.605	13.560	12.000	13.605	13.605
7	George Bihlman	United States	13.575	Did not advance			13.575
8	Howard Cann	United States	13.520	Did not advance			13.520
9	Bertil Jansson	Sweden	13.270	Did not advance			13.270
10	Armas Taipale	Finland	12.945	Did not advance			12.945
11	Oluf Petersen	Denmark	12.525	Did not advance			12.525
12	Raoul Paoli	France	12.485	Did not advance			12.485
13	Aurelio Lenzi	Italy	12.325	Did not advance			12.325
14	Giuseppe Tugnoli	Italy	12.070	Did not advance			12.070
15	Henri Dozolme	France	11.965	Did not advance			11.965
16	Erik Blomqvist (athlete)	Sweden	11.935	Did not advance			11.935
17	Ignacio Izaguirre	Spain	11.235	Did not advance			11.235
18	Gaston Wuyts	Belgium	11.045	Did not advance			11.045
19	Luigi Antognini	Switzerland	10.320	Did not advance			10.320
20	Léon Pottier	Belgium	10.100	Did not advance			10.100
