= Bottura =

Bottura is a surname. Notable people with the surname include:

- Massimo Bottura (born 1962), Italian restaurateur, chef, and cookbook writer
- Oprando Bottura (1896–1961), Italian javelin thrower

== See also ==
- Gucci Osteria da Massimo Bottura
