= Jules Herremans =

Belgian javelin thrower

Personal information
- Nationality: Belgian
- Born: 10 January 1904 Niewenhove, Geraardsbergen, Oost-Vlaanderen, Belgium
- Died: unknown

Sport
- Sport: Athletics
- Event: Javelin throw
- Club: KAA Gent

Jules Joseph Herremans (10 January 1904 – unknown) was a Belgian athlete who competed at the 1928 Summer Olympics.

== Biography ==
Herremans competed in the men's javelin throw at the 1928 Summer Olympics.

Herremans finished second behind Béla Szepes in the javelin throw event at the 1929 AAA Championships.
