= Wipf =

Wipf is a surname. Notable people with the surname include:

- Brandon Wipf, American politician
- Hans Wipf (1898–?), Swiss athlete
- Jacob Wipf (1834–1910), American politician
- Jane Wipf (born 1958), American long-distance runner
- Norm Wipf (born 1939), Canadian politician
- Peter Wipf, American chemistry professor
