= Emil Muller =

Emil Muller or Emil Müller may refer to:

- Emil Müller (mathematician) (1861–1927), Austrian mathematician
- Emil Müller (German officer), an officer in the World War I Imperial German Army charged with war crimes at the Leipzig War Crimes Tribunal
- Emil Muller (discus thrower) (1891–1958), American discus thrower
- Emil Müller (runner) (born 1908), Swiss long-distance runner who finished 10th at the 1934 European 10,000 m championships
- Emil Müller (mycologist) (1920–2008), Swiss mycologist

== See also ==
- Émile Muller (1915–1988), French politician
- Émile Muller (javelin thrower), Belgian javelin thrower
