= Erik Blomqvist =

Erik Blomqvist may refer to:

- Erik Blomqvist (athlete) (1896–1967), Swedish athlete in the javelin throw and the shot put
- Erik Blomqvist (sport shooter) (1879–1956), Swedish sport shooter
- Erik Blomqvist (chess player) (born 1990), Swedish chess player
