= Vilim =

Vilim is both a surname and a given name. Notable people with the name include:

== Given name ==
- William "Vilim" Feller (1906–1970), Croatian-American mathematician
- Vilim Harangozo (1925–1975), Yugoslavia tennis player
- Vilim Herman (born 1949), Croatian lawyer and politician
- Vilim Messner (1904–1988), Croatian athlete
- Vilim Posinković (born 1991), Croatian footballer
- Vilim Zlomislic, renamed Donald Clarke Andrews, (born 1942), Canadian white supremacist

== Surname ==
- Rudolf Vilim (1913–1959), Swiss canoeist
