= Stoschek =

Stoschek is a surname. Notable people with the surname include:

- Erich Stoschek (1903–1985), German athlete
- Julia Stoschek (born 1975), German socialite and art collector
- Michael Stoschek (born 1947/1948), German businessman
