= Sonego =

Sonego is an Italian surname. Notable people with the surname include:

- Carlo Sonego (born 1972), retired Italian javelin thrower
- Lorenzo Sonego (born 1995), Italian tennis player
- Rodolfo Sonego (1921 – 2000), Italian screenwriter
