= Urho Peltonen =

Finnish javelin thrower (1893–1951)

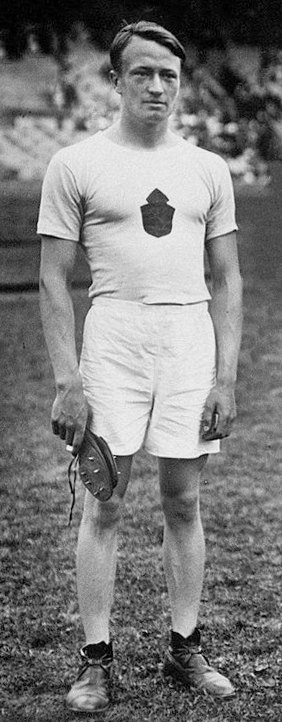
- Peltonen at the 1912 Olympics

Personal information
- Full name: Urho Pellervo Peltonen
- Born: 15 January 1893 Nurmes, Finland
- Died: 4 May 1950 (aged 57) Helsinki, Finland
- Height: 1.78 m (5 ft 10 in)
- Weight: 73 kg (161 lb)

Sport
- Sport: Athletics
- Event: Javelin throw
- Club: Tampeeren SLU; Helsingin Kisa-Veikot; Tampereen Pyrintö

Achievements and titles
- Personal best: 64.35 (1916)
Medal record
Representing Finland
Olympic Games
Bronze medal – third place	1912 Stockholm	Two-handed javelin throw
Silver medal – second place	1920 Antwerp	Javelin throw

Urho Pellervo Peltonen (15 January 1893 – 7 January 1951) was a Finnish athlete who competed mainly in the javelin throw.

He competed for Finland in the 1912 Summer Olympics held in Stockholm, Sweden, in both the regular and two-handed javelin throw, a one-time Olympic event in which the total was counted as a sum of best throws with the right hand and with the left hand. Peltonen won a bronze medal in the latter event behind fellow Finns Julius Saaristo and Väinö Siikaniemi and one place ahead of Swede Eric Lemming, who had won the one hand competition. Eight years later after World War I he again competed for Finland in the 1920 Summer Olympics held in Antwerp, Belgium, where he won the silver medal in the regular javelin as Finland swept the first four places with Jonni Myyrä winning, Paavo Johansson in third and Saaristo in fourth.

His personal best, set in Helsinki in 1916, was 64.35 m. This was superior to Lemming's official world record at the time of 62.32 m, but was never ratified by IAAF as a new world record. However, it was ratified as a Finnish record.

After retiring from competitions Peltonen became an official with the International Association of Athletics Federations.
