= Paavo Johansson =

Finnish javelin thrower (1895-1983)

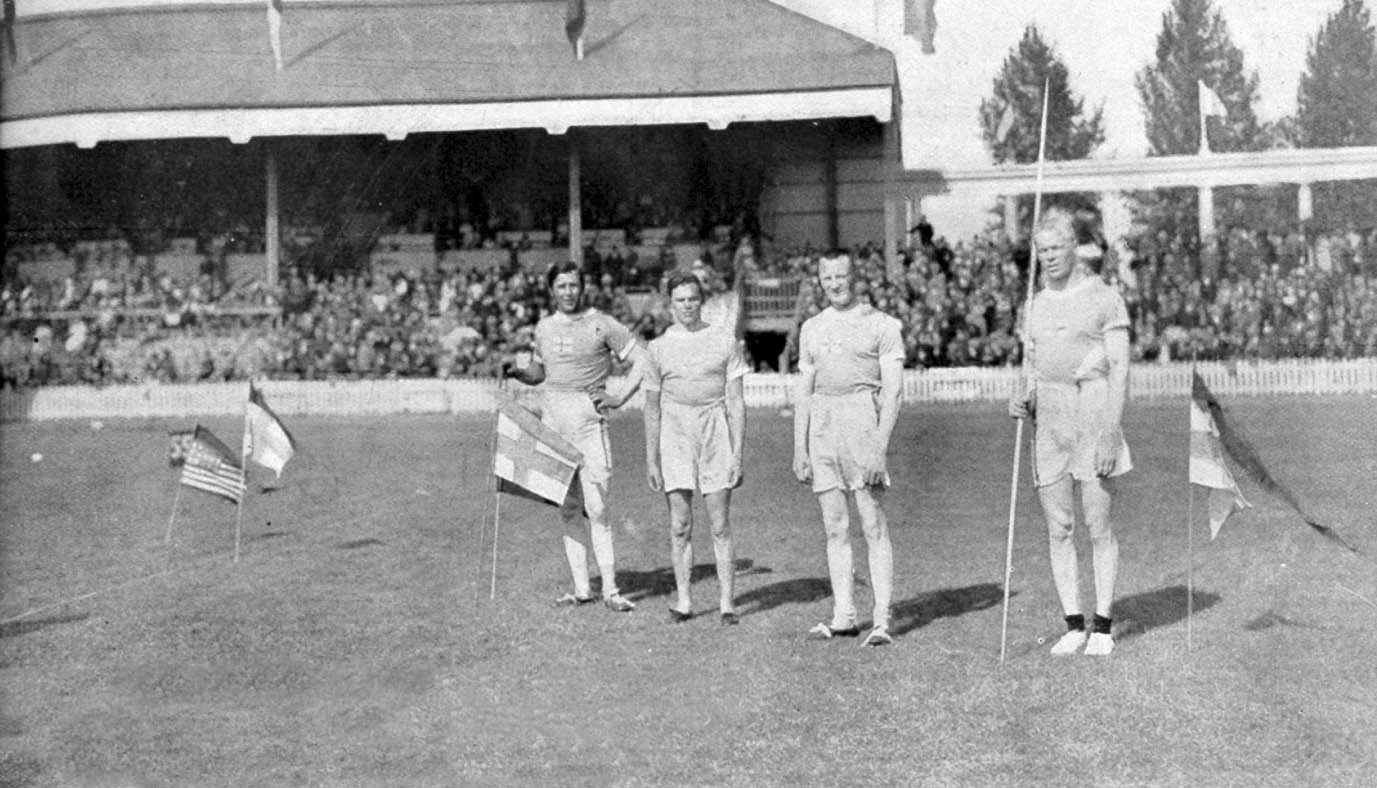
- Paavo Johansson (second from left) with Julius Saaristo, Urho Peltonen and Jonni Myyrä

Personal information
- Nickname: Pekka
- Born: 21 October 1895 Helsinki, Finland
- Died: 5 December 1983 (aged 88)

Sport
- Sport: Athletics
- Event: javelin
- Club: HKV, Helsinki
Medal record
Men's athletics
Representing Finland
Bronze medal – third place	1920 Antwerp	Javelin throw

Paavo Johansson (later Jaale) (21 October 1895, in – 5 December 1983) was a Finnish athlete who competed mainly in the javelin throw.

== Career ==
Johansson competed for Finland in the 1920 Summer Olympics held in Antwerp, Belgium, winning the bronze behind Jonni Myyrä and Urho Peltonen and ahead of Julius Saaristo as Finland claimed the first four spots. He also took part in the decathlon, but dropped out after the first day.

Johansson won the British AAA Championships title in the javelin event at the 1922 AAA Championships.

Johansson returned to the Olympics two years later at Paris, this time competing only in the javelin, but failed to make the six-man final.

He also played football as a forward. He made one appearance for the Finland national team in 1919.
