= Ignacio Izaguirre =

Spanish athletics competitor

Personal information
- Nationality: Spanish
- Born: 26 September 1896 Elgoibar, Spain
- Died: 12 December 1974 (aged 78)

Sport
- Sport: Athletics
- Events: Shot put Javelin

Ignacio Izaguirre (26 September 1896 – 12 December 1974) was a Spanish athlete. He competed in the men's shot put and the men's javelin throw at the 1920 Summer Olympics.
