= Jaap Knol =

Dutch javelin thrower

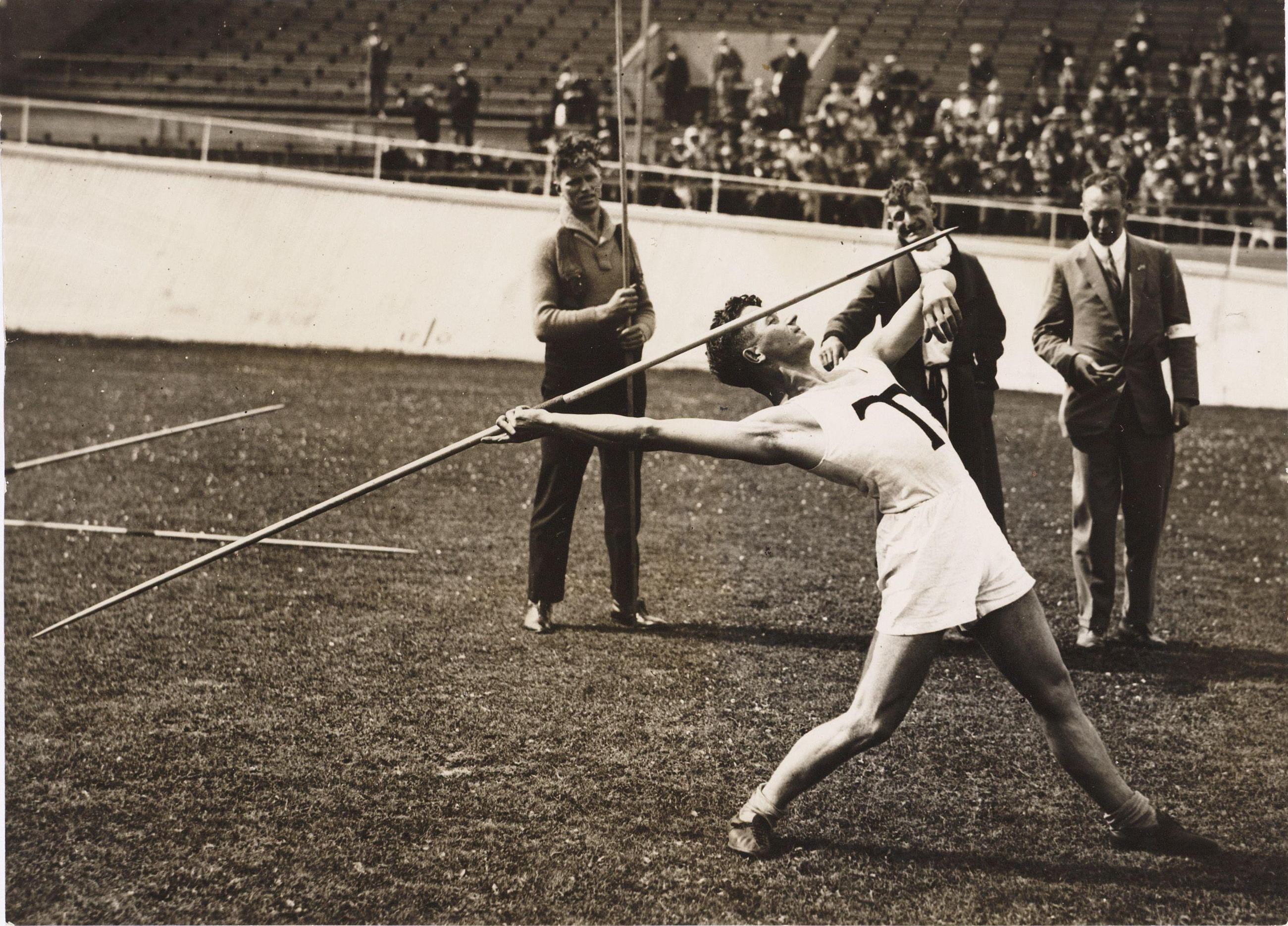
- Jaap Knol in 1927

Personal information
- Nationality: Dutch
- Born: 1 December 1896 Uitgeest, Netherlands
- Died: 8 October 1975 (aged 78) Amsterdam, Netherlands

Sport
- Sport: Athletics
- Event: Javelin throw

Jaap Knol (1 December 1896 – 8 October 1975) was a Dutch athlete. He competed in the men's javelin throw at the 1928 Summer Olympics.
