= Paavo Liettu =

Finnish javelin thrower

Paavo Liettu (16 May 1905 – 4 September 1964) was a Finnish track and field athlete who competed in the 1928 Summer Olympics. He was born in Keuruu and died in Tampere.

In 1928 he finished fourth in the javelin throw competition.
