= Hugo Lilliér =

Swedish javelin thrower

Hugo Olson Lilliér (3 October 1894 – 30 May 1973) was a Swedish track and field athlete who competed in the 1920 Summer Olympics and in the 1924 Summer Olympics. In 1920, he finished tenth in the javelin throw competition. Four years later, he finished 13th in the javelin throw event.
