= Albert Lamppu =

Finnish javelin thrower

Albert Lamppu (April 8, 1899 in Metsäpirtti – July 25, 1976) was a Finnish track and field athlete who competed in the 1928 Summer Olympics.

He was born in Metsäpirtti and died in Helsinki.

In 1928 he finished ninth in the javelin throw competition.
