= James Lincoln (athlete) =

American athletics competitor

James Claiborne Lincoln, Jr. (August 17, 1889 – February 22, 1952) was an American track and field athlete who competed in the 1920 Summer Olympics.

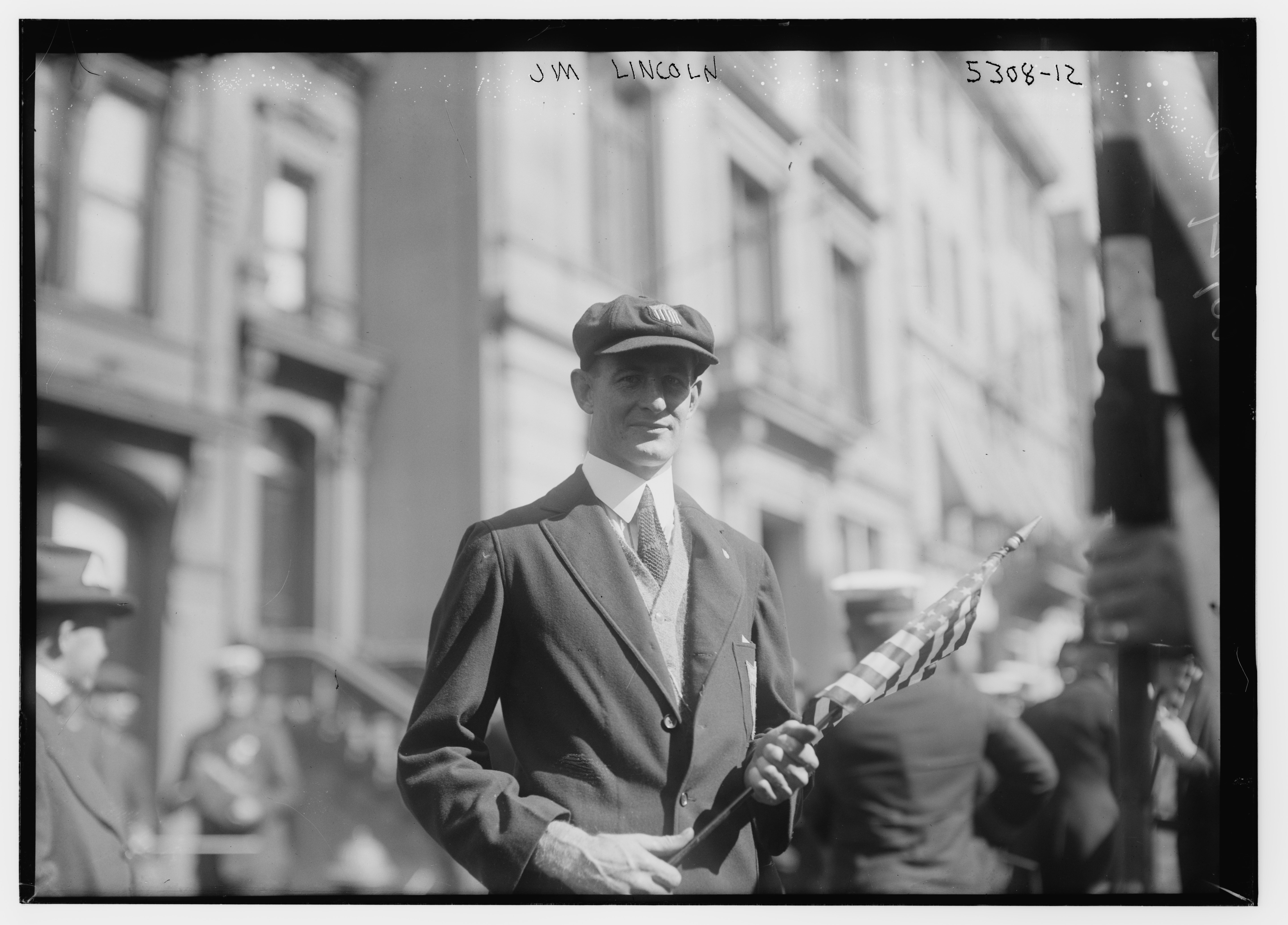

He was born in Saint Joseph, Missouri as the son of James Claiborne Lincoln Sr. (1862–1923) and Annie Shannon Lard (1863–1899). In 1913, he married Margaret Frazer, with whom he had at least two daughters and one son (also James Claiborne), and later married Winifred Strafford. Lincoln lived most of his life in Missouri and Illinois, but between 1915 and 1921, he lived in New York, where he worked as a manufacturer. He died in Chicago, Illinois.

In 1920, he took part in the javelin throw competition. However, it is for what happened just before the competition that Lincoln is best remembered today. As the world record holder Jonni Myyrä was resting on the grass, his left (non-throwing) arm was struck near the elbow by a Lincoln warm-up throw. Myyrä went on to win the gold medal regardless, while Lincoln finished ninth.
