= Arthur Picard =

French javelin thrower

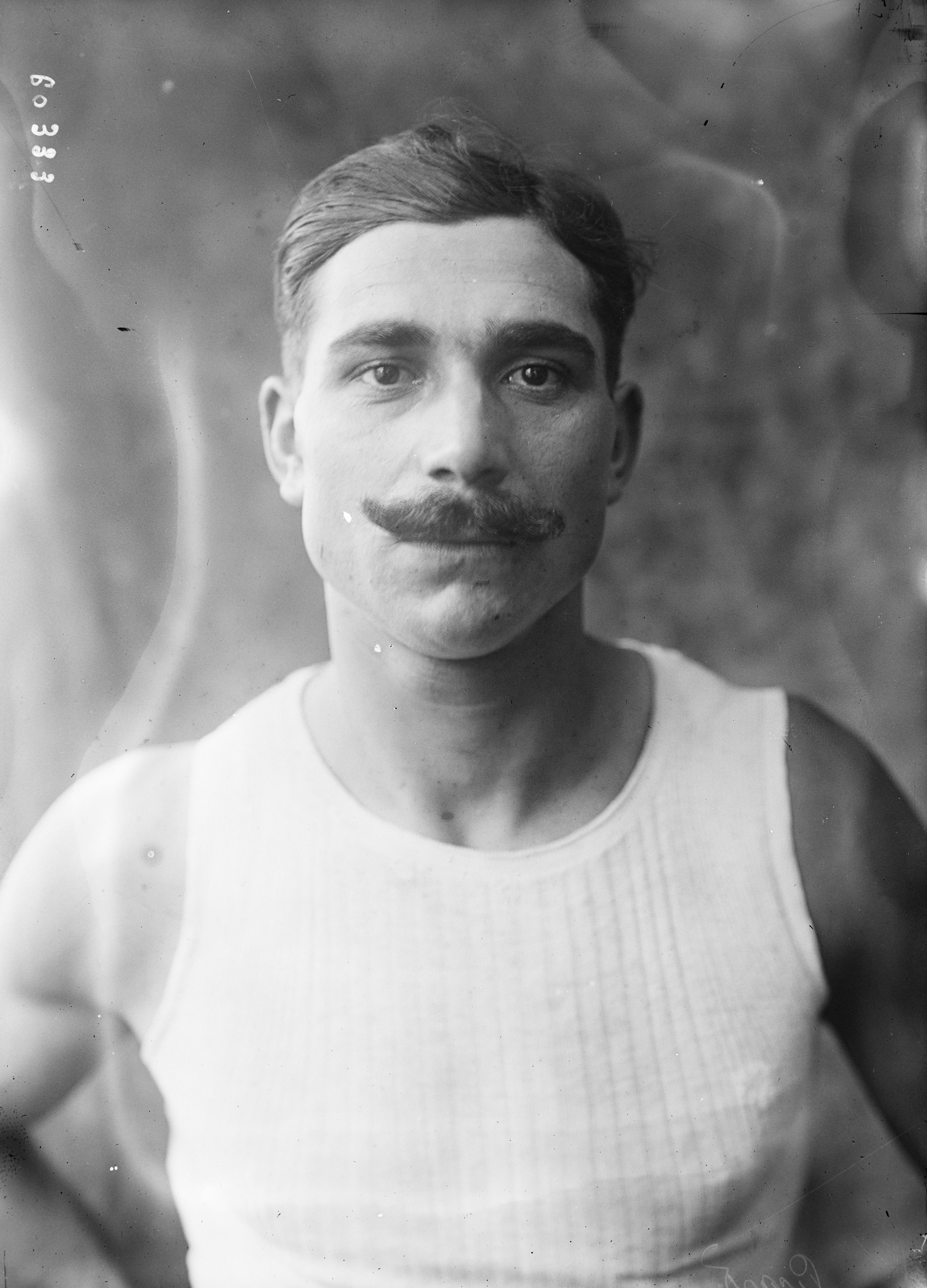
- Picard in 1920

Personal information
- Nationality: French
- Born: 29 December 1894 Gélannes, Aube, France

Sport
- Sport: Athletics
- Event: Javelin throw
- Club: Association Sportive Seine

Arthur Aubertin Picard (born 29 December 1894, date of death unknown) was a French athlete, who competed at the Olympic Games.

== Career ==
Picard finished second behind Frank Murrey in the javelin throw event at the British 1920 AAA Championships.

One month later, Picard went to the 1920 Summer Olympics in Antwerp, Belgium, where he competed in the men's javelin throw.

Picard was the 1922 French Athletics Championships winner,
