= Joop van der Leij =

Dutch javelin thrower

Personal information
- Nationality: Dutch
- Born: 14 October 1898 Amsterdam, Netherlands
- Died: 3 March 1991 (aged 92) Purmerend, Netherlands

Sport
- Sport: Athletics
- Event: Javelin throw

Joop van der Leij (14 October 1898 – 3 March 1991) was a Dutch athlete. He competed in the men's javelin throw at the 1928 Summer Olympics.
