= Yrjö Ekqvist =

Finnish track and field athlete

Yrjö Rafael Ekqvist (10 November 1898 – 20 November 1973) was a Finnish track and field athlete who competed in the 1924 Summer Olympics. He was born in Ekenäs and died in Perniö. In 1924 he finished fourth in the javelin throw competition.
