= Men's javelin throw world record progression =

The first world record in the men's javelin throw was recognised by the International Association of Athletics Federations in 1912.

As of 21 June 2009, 46 world records have been ratified by the IAAF in the event. New specifications for the javelin were introduced in 1986, and javelins with serrated tails were banned in 1991 which reverted to an earlier record set in 1990.

== Record progression ==
Mark	Athlete	Date	Location
62.32	Eric Lemming (SWE)	29 September 1912	Stockholm, Sweden
66.10	Jonni Myyrä (FIN)	25 August 1919	Stockholm, Sweden
66.62	Gunnar Lindström (SWE)	12 October 1924	Eksjö, Sweden
69.88	Eino Penttilä (FIN)	8 October 1927	Viipuri, Finland
71.01	Erik Lundqvist (SWE)	15 August 1928	Stockholm, Sweden
71.57	Matti Järvinen (FIN)	8 August 1930	Viipuri, Finland
71.70	Matti Järvinen (FIN)	17 August 1930	Tampere, Finland
71.88	Matti Järvinen (FIN)	31 August 1930	Vaasa, Finland
72.93	Matti Järvinen (FIN)	14 September 1930	Viipuri, Finland
74.02	Matti Järvinen (FIN)	27 June 1932	Turku, Finland
74.28	Matti Järvinen (FIN)	25 May 1933	Mikkeli, Finland
74.61	Matti Järvinen (FIN)	7 June 1933	Vaasa, Finland
76.10	Matti Järvinen (FIN)	15 June 1933	Helsinki, Finland
76.66	Matti Järvinen (FIN)	7 September 1934	Turin, Italy
77.23	Matti Järvinen (FIN)	18 June 1936	Helsinki, Finland
77.87	Yrjö Nikkanen (FIN)	25 August 1938	Karhula, Finland
78.70	Yrjö Nikkanen (FIN)	16 October 1938	Kotka, Finland
80.41	Bud Held (USA)	8 August 1953	Pasadena, CA, United States
81.75	Bud Held (USA)	21 May 1955	Modesto, CA, United States
83.56	Soini Nikkinen (FIN)	24 June 1956	Kuhmoinen, Finland
83.66	Janusz Sidło (POL)	30 June 1956	Milan, Italy
85.71	Egil Danielsen (NOR)	26 November 1956	Melbourne
86.04	Albert Cantello (USA)	5 June 1959	Compton, CA, United States
86.74	Carlo Lievore (ITA)	1 June 1961	Milan, Italy
87.12	Terje Pedersen (NOR)	1 July 1964	Oslo, Norway
91.72	Terje Pedersen (NOR)	2 September 1964	Oslo, Norway
91.98	Jānis Lūsis (URS)	23 June 1968	Saarijärvi, Finland
92.70	Jorma Kinnunen (FIN)	18 June 1969	Tampere, Finland
93.80	Jānis Lūsis (URS)	6 July 1972	Stockholm, Sweden
94.08	Klaus Wolfermann (FRG)	5 May 1973	Leverkusen, West Germany
94.58	Miklós Németh (HUN)	25 July 1976	Montreal, Canada
96.72	Ferenc Paragi (HUN)	23 April 1980	Tata, Hungary
99.72	Tom Petranoff (USA)	15 May 1983	Los Angeles, United States
104.80	Uwe Hohn (GDR)	20 July 1984	East Berlin, East Germany

New specifications were introduced in 1986.

Mark	Athlete	Date	Location
85.74	Klaus Tafelmeier (FRG)	21 September 1986	Como, Italy
87.66	Jan Železný (TCH)	31 May 1987	Nitra, Czechoslovakia
89.10	Patrik Bodén (SWE)	24 March 1990	Austin, United States
89.58	Steve Backley (GBR)	2 July 1990	Stockholm, Sweden
89.66 *	Jan Železný (TCH)	14 July 1990	Oslo, Norway
90.98 *	Steve Backley (GBR)	20 July 1990	London, England
91.98 *	Seppo Räty (FIN)	6 May 1991	Shizuoka, Japan
96.96 *	Seppo Räty (FIN)	2 June 1991	Punkalaidun, Finland

* achieved using Németh model (serrated tail)

Javelins with serrated tails were outlawed by the IAAF in Tokyo in August 1991 at the IAAF-Congress; several of the above records were rescinded as from 20 September 1991, and the record reverted to Steve Backley's 89.58, the longest throw with the regular new implement (as of 1986).

Mark	Athlete	Date	Location	Duration of record
89.58	Steve Backley (GBR)	2 July 1990	Stockholm, Sweden	1 year, 6 months and 23 days
91.46	Steve Backley (GBR)	25 January 1992	North Shore City, New Zealand	1 year, 2 months and 12 days
95.54	Jan Železný (CZE)	6 April 1993	Pietersburg, South Africa	4 months and 23 days
95.66	Jan Železný (CZE)	29 August 1993	Sheffield, United Kingdom	2 years, 8 months and 26 days
98.48	Jan Železný (CZE)	25 May 1996	Jena, Germany	30 years, 3 months

== See also ==
- Women's javelin throw world record progression
- Men's javelin throw Italian record progression
