= Aurelio Lenzi =

Italian shot putter and discus thrower

Personal information
- Nationality: Italian
- Born: 19 June 1891 Pistoia, Italy
- Died: 23 December 1967 (aged 76)

Sport
- Country: Italy
- Sport: Athletics
- Events: Discus throw Shot put
- Club: Libertas Pistoia

Achievements and titles
- Personal bests: Discus throw: 43.65 m (1913); Shot put: 13.51 m (1913)

Aurelio Lenzi (19 June 1891 – 23 December 1967) was an Italian track and field athlete who competed in the 1912 Summer Olympics and in the 1920 Summer Olympics.

== Biography ==
He was born in Pistoia. In 1912 he finished twelfth in the shot put competition and 18th in the discus throw event. Eight years later he finished ninth in the discus throw competition and 13th in the shot put event.

== National titles ==
Franco Leccese has won 5 times the individual national championship.

- 2 wins in Shot put (1919, 1921)
- 3 wins in Discus throw (1913, 1919, 1921)
