= Simon Grany =

French javelin thrower

Pierre Simon Grany (23 January 1899 – 21 November 1988) was a French track and field athlete who competed in the 1920 Summer Olympics. In 1920, he finished 14th in the javelin throw competition.
