= Vilho Rinne =

Finnish javelin thrower (1895–1980)

Personal information
- Nationality: Finnish
- Born: 5 April 1895
- Died: 25 June 1980 (aged 85)

Sport
- Sport: Athletics
- Event: Javelin throw

Vilho Rinne (5 April 1895 – 25 June 1980) was a Finnish athlete. He competed in the men's javelin throw at the 1928 Summer Olympics.
