= Giovanni Lievore =

Italian javelin thrower (1932–2025)

Personal information
- Nationality: Italian
- Born: 20 March 1932 Carrè, Italy
- Died: 28 April 2025 (aged 93)
- Height: 1.85 m (6 ft 1 in)
- Weight: 80 kg (176 lb)

Sport
- Country: Italy
- Sport: Athletics
- Event: Javelin throw
- Club: CUS Roma

Giovanni Lievore (20 March 1932 – 28 April 2025) was an Italian javelin thrower. He competed at the 1956 Summer Olympics finishing sixth, which as of 2025 was the best result for an Italian javelin thrower at the Olympics. At the 1958 European Athletics Championships he finished eighth, and the same year he realized his personal record of 80,72 meters. After his retirement, he moved to Turin and worked at Fiat. He was the older brother of the former javelin world record holder Carlo Lievore.

Lievore died on 28 April 2025, at the age of 93.
