= Valther Jensen =

Danish track and field athlete (1888–1982)

Valther Valdemar Jensen (1 March 1888 – 15 March 1982) was a Danish track and field athlete who competed in the 1920 Summer Olympics. In 1920, he finished seventh in the discus throw competition. He was the 1916 Danish shot put champion.
