= Samba Ciré =

French javelin thrower

Personal information
- Full name: Saidi Samba-Ciré
- Nationality: French
- Born: 1898

Sport
- Sport: Athletics
- Event: Javelin throw

Samba Ciré (born 1898, date of death unknown) was a French athlete. He competed in the men's javelin throw at the 1924 Summer Olympics.
