= Henri Dauban de Silhouette =

British javelin thrower

Personal information
- Nationality: British
- Born: 7 July 1901
- Died: 23 May 1991 (aged 89)

Sport
- Sport: Athletics
- Event: Javelin throw
- Club: Blackheath Harriers

Henri Dauban de Silhouette (7 July 1901 – 23 May 1991) was a British athlete. He competed in the men's javelin throw at the 1924 Summer Olympics.
