= Gus Pope =

American athlete (1898–1953)

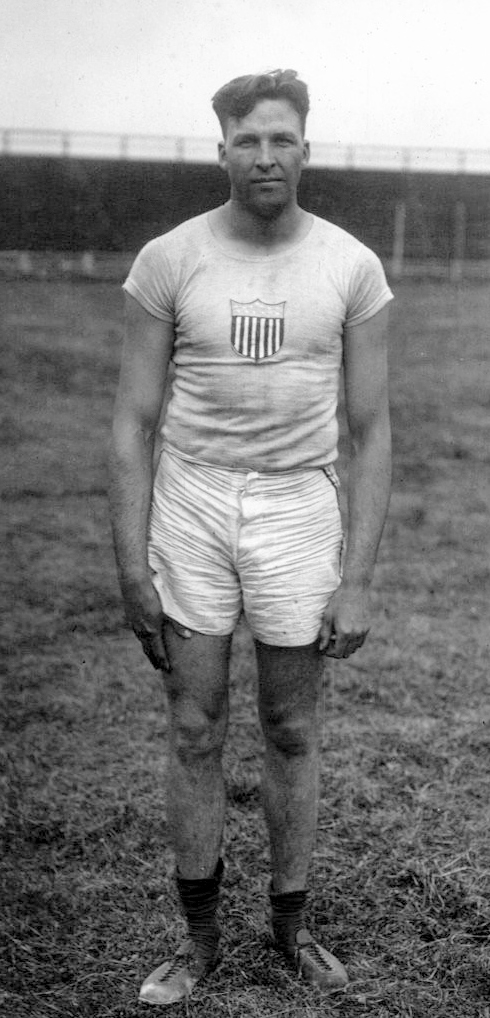
- Pope in 1920

Personal information
- Born: November 29, 1898 Seattle, Washington, United States
- Died: 1953 (aged 54)
- Height: 185 cm (6 ft 1 in)
- Weight: 95 kg (209 lb)

Sport
- Sport: Athletics
- Events: Discus throw, shot put
- Club: Illinois Athletic Club, Chicago

Achievements and titles
- Personal bests: DT – 46.50 m (1921); SP – 14.25 m (1925)
Medal record
Men's athletics
Representing the United States
Olympic Games
Bronze medal – third place	1920 Antwerp	Discus throw

Augustus Russell Pope (November 29, 1898 – 1953) was an American athlete. He won the bronze medal in the discus throw at the 1920 Summer Olympics and finished fourth in 1924.

In June 1921, Pope was the individual points leader with 10 points at the first NCAA track and field championships; Pope competed for the University of Washington and won both the shot put and the discus events at the 1921 NCAA championships. The same year he was ranked as world's best discus thrower. Pope also played American football for the Huskies in 1919–20. He was the first University of Washington athlete to medal in the Olympics.
