= William Bartlett (discus thrower) =

American discus thrower

William Kenneth Charles Bartlett (October 23, 1896 – December 30, 1946) was an American discus thrower, who competed in the 1920 Summer Olympics. He was born in La Grange, Illinois and died in Alameda County, California.

In 1920, he finished fifth in the discus throw competition.
