= Lee Priester =

American javelin thrower

Lee Bryan Priester, Jr. (April 15, 1903 – June 11, 1988) was an American track and field athlete who competed in the 1924 Summer Olympics. He was born in Monroe, Louisiana and died in Meridian, Mississippi.

Priester competed for the Mississippi State Bulldogs track and field team in the NCAA.

In 1924, he was eliminated in the qualification of the javelin throw competition and finished eleventh overall.
