= Olav Sunde =

Norwegian javelin thrower

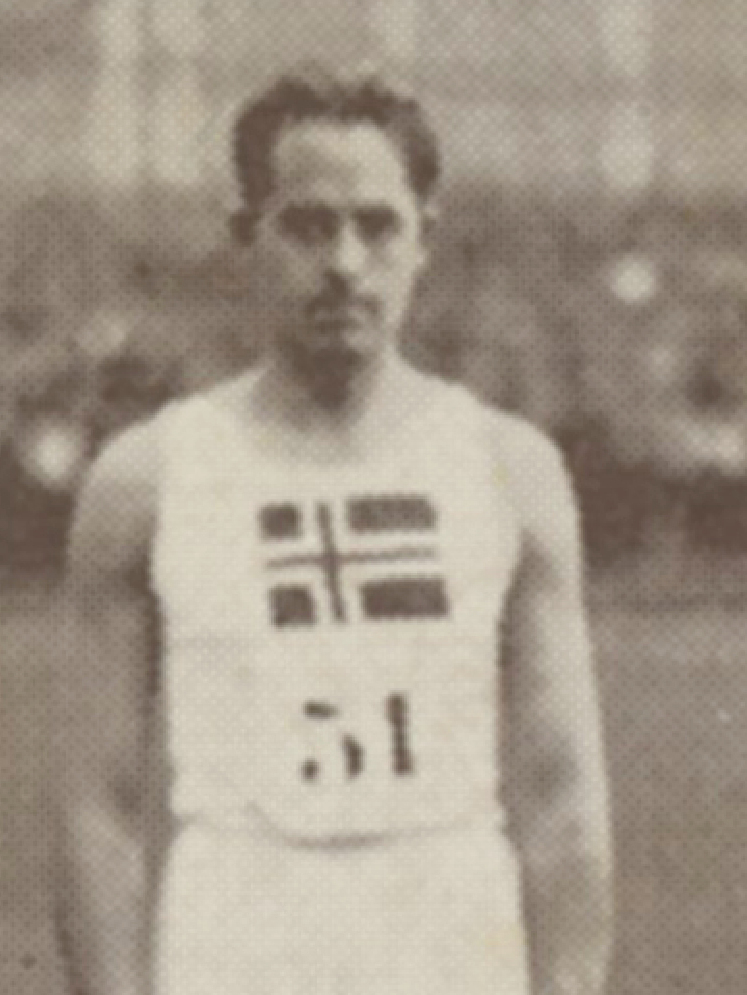
- Sunde, c. 1930

Personal information
- Born: 17 August 1903 Oslo, Norway
- Died: 10 November 1985 (aged 82) Oslo, Norway
- Height: 180 cm (5 ft 11 in)
- Weight: 77 kg (170 lb)

Sport
- Sport: Athletics
- Event: Javelin
- Club: IK Tjalve, Oslo
Medal record
Men's Olympic Games
Representing Norway
Bronze medal – third place	1928 Amsterdam	Javelin throw

Olav Sunde (17 August 1903 – 10 November 1985) was a javelin thrower from Oslo, Norway. He represented IK Tjalve, who competed at two Olympic Games.

== Career ==
Sunde won the British AAA Championships title in the javelin throw event at the 1926 AAA Championships but only managed second the following year behind Béla Szepes at the 1927 AAA Championships. However, he went on to win a second British AAA javelin title at the 1931 AAA Championships.

Sunde won the bronze medal at the 1928 Summer Olympics with a throw of 63.97 metres. At the 1932 Summer Olympics he finished ninth with 60.81 metres. In addition he won nine Norwegian championships between 1927 and 1937.

His personal best throw was 67.04 metres, achieved in June 1932 on Bislett stadion.
