= Arthur De Laender =

Belgian athletics competitor

Personal information
- Nationality: Belgian
- Born: 28 July 1890 Ghent
- Died: 24 December 1966 (aged 76) Ghent

Sport
- Sport: Athletics
- Event(s): Discus throw Javelin throw

Arthur De Laender (28 July 1890 – 24 December 1966) was a Belgian athlete. He competed in the men's discus throw and the men's javelin throw at the 1920 Summer Olympics.
