= George Bihlman =

American shot putter

George Hermann Bihlman (February 18, 1895 – February 3, 1985) was an American track and field athlete who competed in the 1920 Summer Olympics. In 1920 he finished seventh in the shot put competition.
