= Oluf Petersen =

Danish athletics competitor (1888–1964)

Frederik Oluf Nikolaj Petersen (16 July 1888 – 20 November 1964) was a Danish track and field athlete who competed in the 1920 Summer Olympics. He was born in Vejleby, Rødby and died in Copenhagen. In 1920 he finished eleventh in the shot put event and nineteenth in the javelin throw competition.
