= Jiří Svoboda (athlete) =

Czech javelin thrower

Personal information
- Nationality: Czech
- Born: 24 December 1903 Šlapanice, Austria-Hungary
- Died: 10 May 1937 (aged 33) Brno, Czechoslovakia

Sport
- Sport: Athletics
- Event: Javelin throw

Jiří Svoboda (24 December 1903 – 10 May 1937) was a Czech athlete. He competed in the men's javelin throw at the 1924 Summer Olympics.
