= Milton Angier =

American javelin thrower (1899–1967)

Milton Sanford Angier (May 28, 1899 – May 3, 1967) was an American track and field athlete. He was born in Beardstown, Illinois and died in Staunton, Virginia.

In July 1920 he was the Amateur Athletic Union's javelin champion. Later in that year he finished seventh in the Olympic javelin throw competition in Antwerp, Belgium. He was the AAU javelin champion again in 1921. In April 1922 he set an American record in the javelin.

Milton was an All-American for the Illinois Fighting Illini track and field team, finishing 4th in the javelin at the 1922 NCAA Track and Field Championships.

Angier served in the Army Air Force in both World War I and World War II, rising to the rank of major. He graduated from the University of Illinois, Urbana-Champaign in 1924. Angier died in Staunton, Virginia, and is buried with his wife Helen Johns in Thornrose Cemetery in Augusta County, Virginia.
