= Taki N'Dio =

French javelin thrower

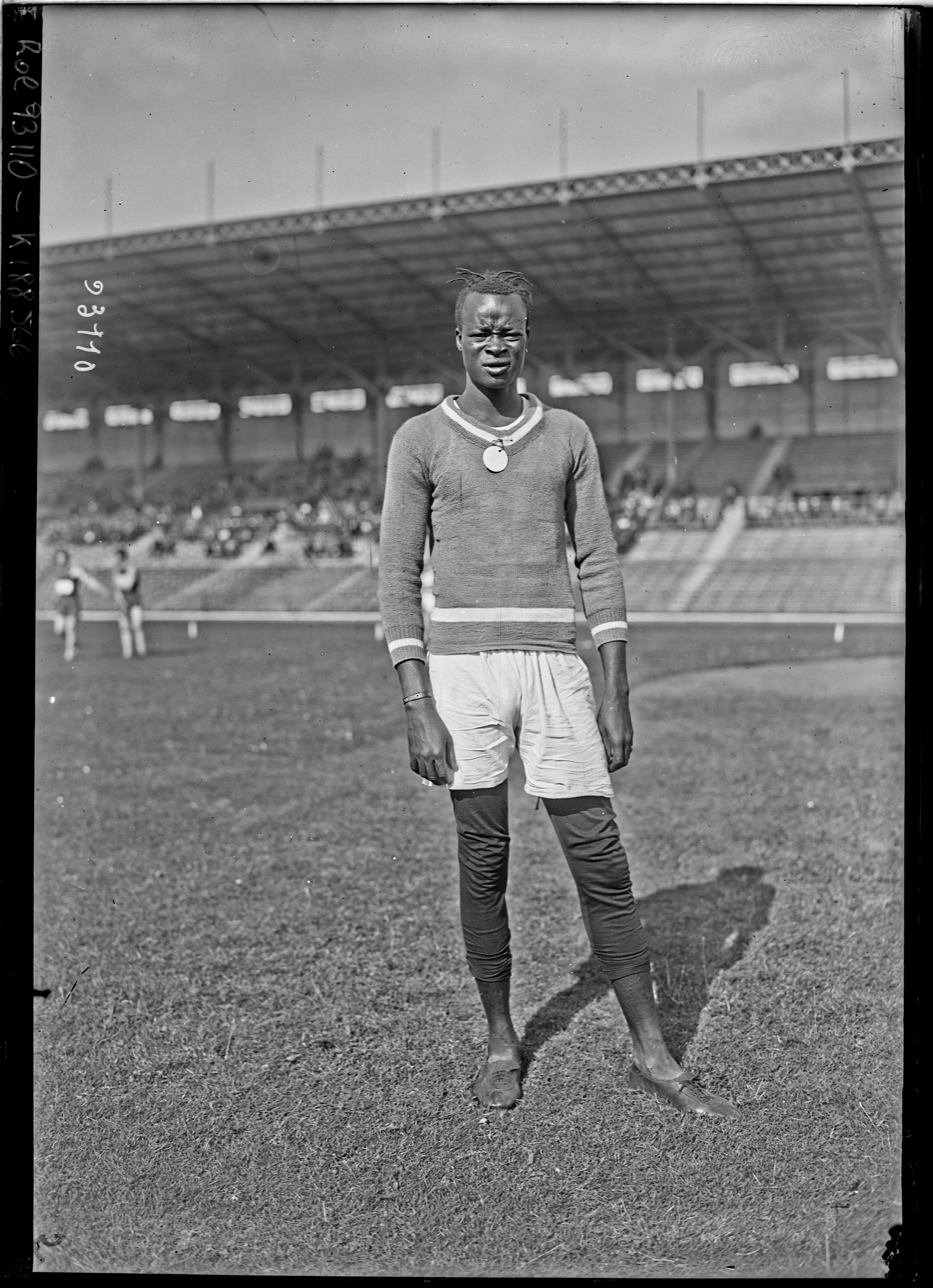
- N'Dio in 1924

Personal information
- Nationality: French
- Born: 1896 Balé, Moyen-Chari, Chad
- Died: 6 May 1935 (aged 39–40)

Sport
- Sport: Athletics
- Event: Javelin throw

Taki N'Dio (1896 – 6 May 1935) was a French athlete. He competed in the men's javelin throw at the 1924 Summer Olympics.
