= William Neufeld =

American javelin thrower

- Born: February 27 1901; Halbstadt, Ukraine
- Died: October 11 1992; Riverside, California
- Occupation: Athlete

William Neufeld (February 27, 1901 – October 11, 1992) was an American track and field athlete who competed in the 1924 Summer Olympics.

He was born in Molotschna and died in Riverside, California. In 1924 he finished fifth in the javelin throw competition.
