= Carlo Lievore =

Italian javelin thrower

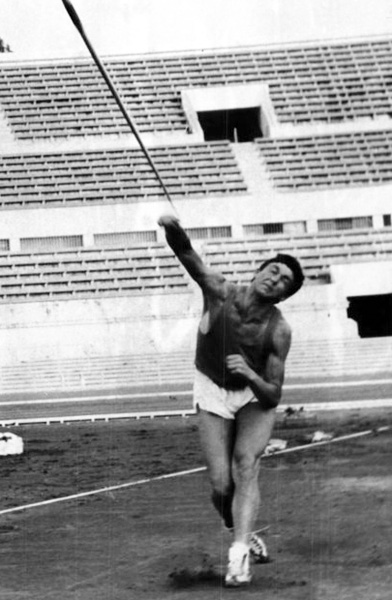

Personal information
- Nationality: Italian
- Born: 10 November 1937 Carrè, Italy
- Died: 9 October 2002 (aged 64) Turin, Italy
- Height: 1.85 m (6 ft 1 in)
- Weight: 89 kg (196 lb)

Sport
- Country: Italy
- Sport: Athletics
- Event: Javelin throw
- Club: Fiat Torino

Achievements and titles
- Personal best: Javelin throw: 86.74 (1961)
Medal record
Mediterranean Games
Gold medal – first place	1963 Naples	Javelin throw

Carlo Lievore (10 November 1937 – 9 October 2002) was an Italian javelin thrower.

== Biography ==
He won one medal, at senior level, at the International athletics competitions. He competed in the 1960 Summer Olympics and in the 1964 Summer Olympics. His older brother Giovanni Lievore was also a javelin thrower. He has 42 caps in national team from 1956 to 1971.

== World record ==
- Javelin throw: 86.74 m ( (Italy) Milan, 1 June 1961) - holder til 1 June 1964

== Olympic results ==
Year	Competition	Venue	Position	Event	Performance	Notes
1960	Olympic Games	(Italy) Rome	9th	Javelin throw	75.21 m	
1964	Olympic Games	(Japan) Tokyo	Qual	Javelin throw	74.82 m	

== National titles ==
Lievore won the individual national championship six times. His six wins came in the javelin throw in 1957, 1959, 1960, 1961, 1964, and 1969.

== See also ==
- FIDAL Hall of Fame
- Men's javelin world record progression
