= Bruno Schlokat =

German javelin thrower

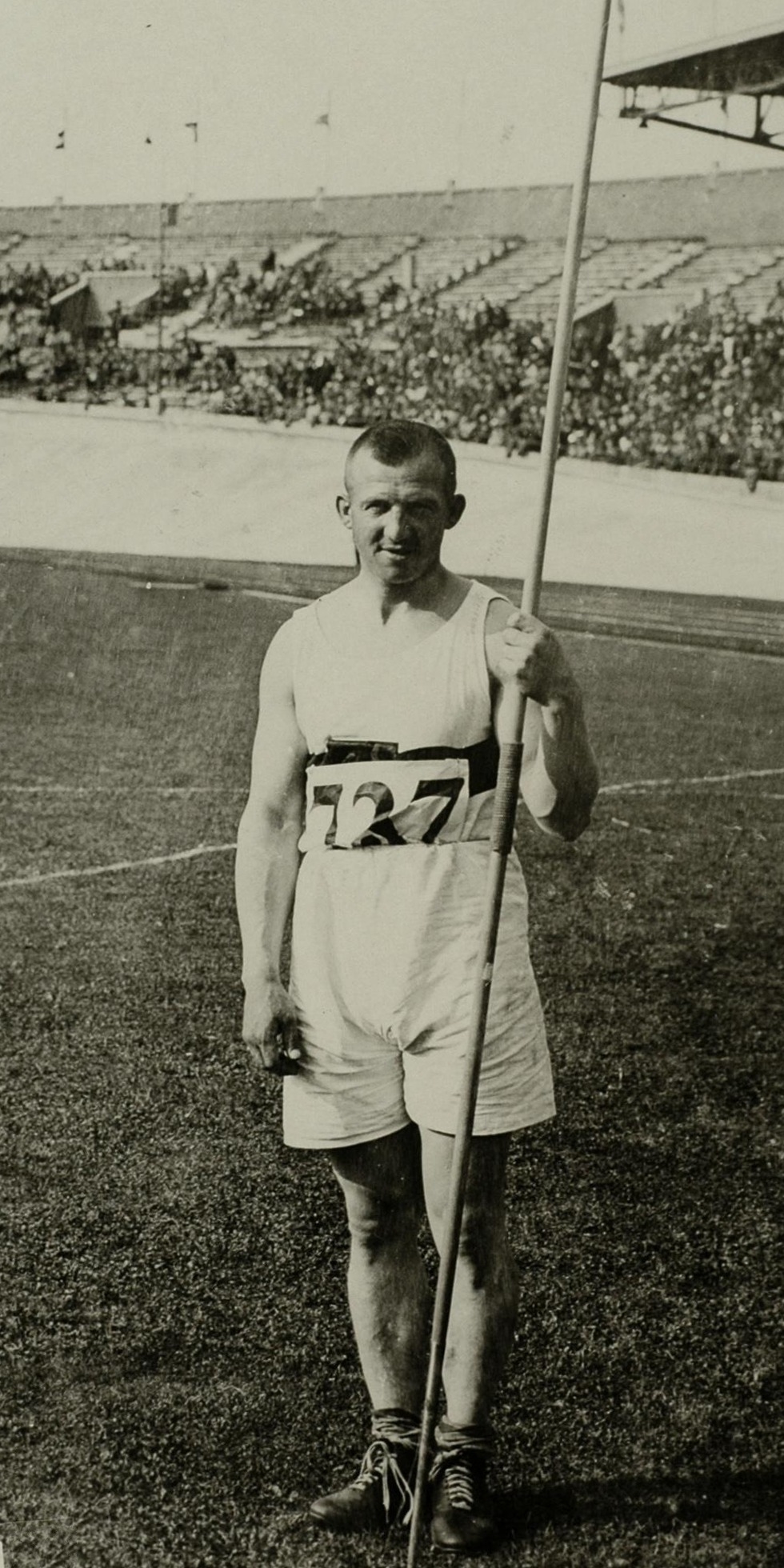
- Bruno Schlokat at the 1928 Olympics

Personal information
- Born: 23 June 1898 Königsberg, Germany
- Died: 14 September 1993 (aged 95) Elmshorn, Germany
- Height: 1.70 m (5 ft 7 in)
- Weight: 82 kg (181 lb)

Sport
- Sport: Javelin throw
- Club: Preußen Insterburg

Achievements and titles
- Olympic finals: 1928

Willy Bruno Ewald Schlokat (23 June 1898 – 14 September 1993) was a German track and field athlete. He competed in the javelin throw at the 1928 Summer Olympics and finished in fifth place with a result of 63.40 m, which was 1.20 m below his personal best.
