= Allan Eriksson =

Swedish discus thrower

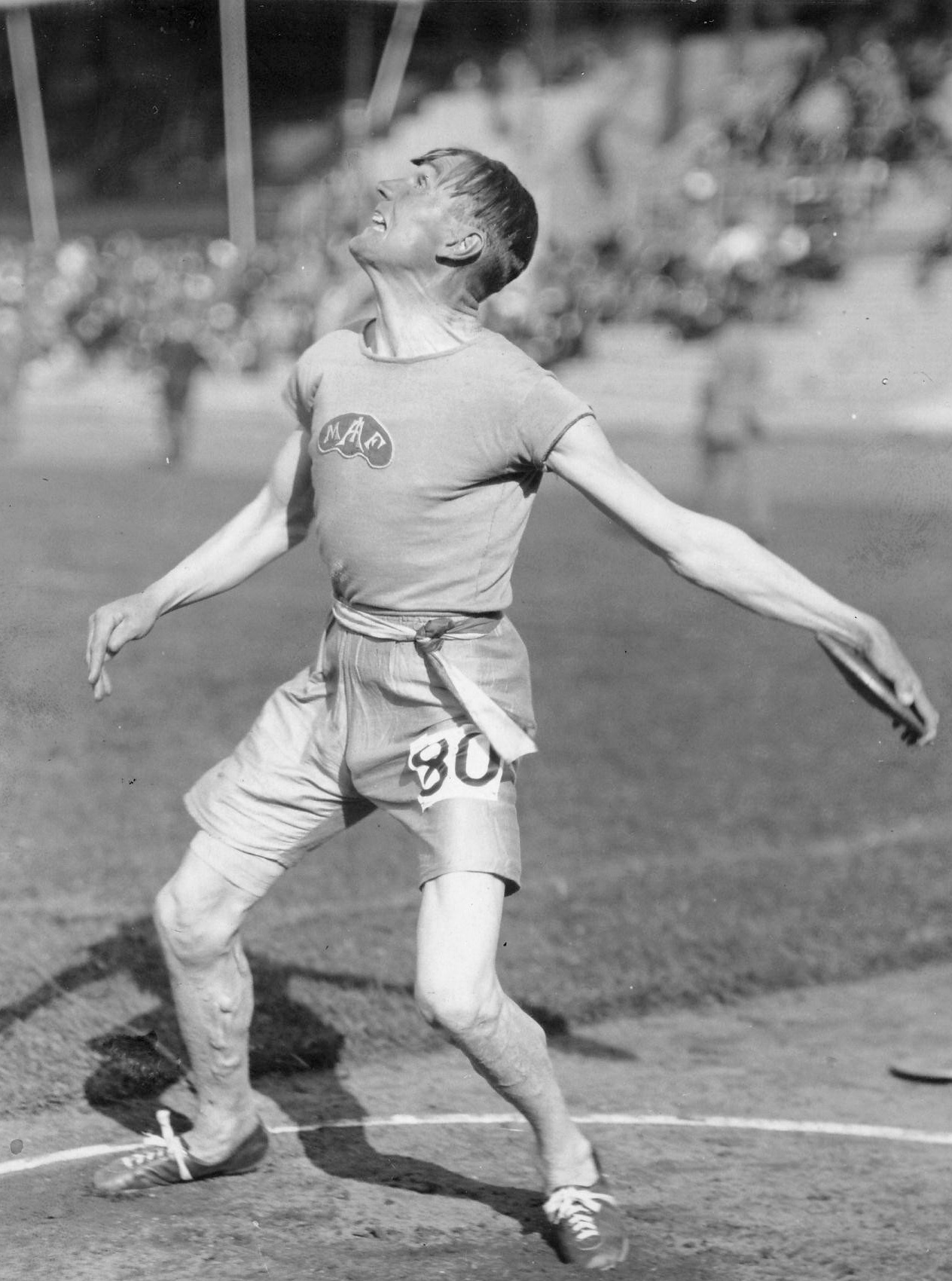

Personal information
- Born: 21 March 1894 Grängesberg, Sweden
- Died: 20 February 1963 (aged 68) Ulricehamn, Sweden

Sport
- Sport: Athletics
- Event: Discus throw
- Club: Katrineholms AIK

Achievements and titles
- Personal best: 44.26 m (1927)

Allan Eriksson (21 March 1894 – 20 February 1963) was a Swedish discus thrower. He competed at the 1920 Summer Olympics and finished in sixth place. Eriksson won the national title in the two-handed discus throw in 1923–25 and held the national record in this event. In 1928, he was awarded Stora Grabbars Märke number 52.
