= Otakar Vydra =

Czech javelin thrower

Personal information
- Nationality: Czech
- Born: 11 August 1901 Prague, Austria-Hungary
- Died: 31 October 1982 (aged 81)

Sport
- Sport: Athletics
- Event: Javelin throw

Otakar Vydra (11 August 1901 – 31 October 1982) was a Czech athlete. He competed in the men's javelin throw at the 1920 Summer Olympics.
