= Vilim Messner =

Croatian javelin thrower

Personal information
- Nationality: Croatian
- Born: 11 April 1904 Požega, Austria-Hungary
- Died: 5 June 1988 (aged 84) Zemun, Yugoslavia

Sport
- Sport: Athletics
- Event: Javelin throw

Vilim Messner (11 April 1904 – 5 June 1988) was a Croatian athlete. He competed in the men's javelin throw at the 1928 Summer Olympics, representing Yugoslavia.
