= Bartolommeo Ardy =

Italian painter (1821–1887)

Bartolommeo Ardy (1821 – 1 July 1887) was an Italian painter, mainly of landscapes of the Piedmont and Alpine regions. Later he became active in maiolica painting.

== Biography ==
Ardy was born in Saluzzo. He first studied in Geneva under Alexandre Calame, and painted mainly landscapes. He then settled in Rome. He won a prize at the first national exposition in Parma. But in 1848, he enrolled in the Italian armies in the war of independence, fighting in the Battle of Cornuda. He was awarded a medal of valor by the Roman Senate. After the war, he moved to Turin. By 1866, he was a member of the Royal Albertina Academy in 1866 as inspector-economist. By 1870, he helped found a school of ceramic painting at the Albertina under the tutelage of Giuseppe Devers, After Devers died in 1883, Ardy became the professor of industrial arts at the Academy.
