= Sorkifalud =

- Location of Vas county in Hungary

- Location of Sorkifalud
- Coordinates: 47.13342°N 16.73494°E
- Country: Hungary
- County: Vas

Area
  - Total: 17.37 km^{2} (6.71 sq mi)

Population (2004)
  - Total: 682
  - Density: 39.26/km^{2} (101.7/sq mi)
- Time zone: UTC+1 (CET)
  - Summer (DST): UTC+2 (CEST)
- Postal code: 9774
- Area code: 94

Sorkifalud is a village in Vas county, Hungary.
