= Carlo Sonego =

Italian javelin thrower

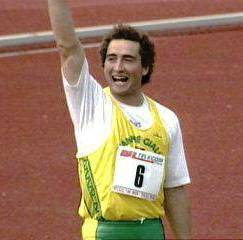
- Sonego in the 1990s

Personal information
- Nationality: Italian
- Born: 20 February 1972 (age 54) Sacile, Italy

Sport
- Country: Italy
- Sport: Athletics
- Event: Javelin throw
- Club: G.S. Fiamme Gialle
- Coached by: Walter Rizzi

Achievements and titles
- Personal best: Javelin throw: 84.60 m (1999)

Carlo Sonego (born 20 February 1972) is a retired javelin thrower from Italy.

== Biography ==
He won two national titles (1994 and 1999) during his career. He set his personal best (84.60 metres) on 8 May 1999 in Osaka, Japan. Born in Sacile, he is son of Gianfranco Sonego and is the nephew of Renato Sonego owner of Sonego Sport cycling team.

== National records ==
- Javelin throw: 84.60 m ( (Japan) Osaka, 8 May 1999) – current holder

== Progression ==
He finished the season 1999 in world top 25 (at 16th).

Year	Time	Venue	Date	World Rank	Note
1994	74.14 m	(Italy) Lignano Sabbiadoro	7 July		
1995	74.90 m	(South Africa) Cape Town	6 May		
1998	82.44 m	(Italy) Tivoli	30 May		
1999	84.60 m	(Japan) Osaka	8 May	16th	

== Achievements ==
Year	Competition	Venue	Result	Measure	Note
1998	European Championships	(Hungary) Budapest	15th	77.74 m	

== National titles ==
Carlo Sonego has won 3 times for the individual national championships.

- 2 wins in javelin throw (1994, 1999)
- 1 win in javelin throw (1999) at the Italian Winter Throwing Championships

== See also ==
- Italian records in athletics
- Italian all-time lists – Javelin throw
- Men's javelin throw Italian record progression
