= Henri Dozolme =

French shot putter

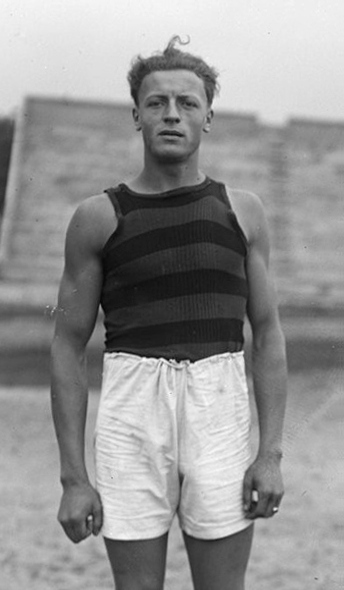
- Dozolme in 1920

Personal information
- Born: Puy-de-Dôme, France
- Died: 2 February 1976 (aged 76) Thiers, Puy-de-Dôme, France

Sport
- Sport: Athletics
- Event: Shot put
- Club: Club Association Sportive Thiers

Henri Jean Marie Dozolme (21 May 1899 – 2 February 1976) was a French shot putter who competed at the 1920 Summer Olympics and placed 15th.
