= Émile Muller (javelin thrower) =

Belgian javelin thrower

Personal information
- Nationality: Belgian

Sport
- Sport: Athletics
- Event: Javelin throw

Émile Muller was a Belgian athlete. He competed in the men's javelin throw at the 1920 Summer Olympics.
