= Hans Wipf =

Swiss javelin thrower

Personal information
- Nationality: Swiss
- Born: 1898

Sport
- Sport: Athletics
- Event: Javelin throw

Hans Wipf (born 1898, date of death unknown) was a Swiss athlete. He competed in the men's javelin throw at the 1924 Summer Olympics.
