= Erich Stoschek =

German javelin thrower

Personal information
- Nationality: German
- Born: 14 February 1903
- Died: 5 February 1985 (aged 81)

Sport
- Sport: Athletics
- Event: Javelin throw

Erich Stoschek (14 February 1903 – 5 February 1985) was a German athlete. He competed in the men's javelin throw at the 1928 Summer Olympics.
