= Wani Ardy =

- Born: Nur Syazwani binti Abdul Rahim; 25 October 1984 (age 41); Kuala Lumpur, Malaysia
- Genres: Trip hop, lyrical poetry, acoustic music
- Occupations: Creative writer, poet, singer-songwriter
- Instruments: Vocals, guitar, peking
- Years active: 2006–present
- Label: Independent

Wani Ardy (born Nur Syazwani Abd Rahim; 25 October 1984) is a Malaysian creative writer, poet, and singer-songwriter. She identifies her music as trip hop, lyrical poetry, and acoustic music.

== Background ==
Wani was born as Nur Syazwani binti Abdul Rahim in Kuala Lumpur and raised in Subang Jaya. She did not grow up in an artistic or musical environment. Her father came from a religious Johorean family while her Singaporean mother was very strict about her education. Though her father was a multi-instrumentalist during his time in Malaya University and her mother was an English teacher, their occupations changed as soon as they had children.

Unlike her siblings and cousins, Wani did rather poorly in school, describing herself as "a slow learner" and "a foolishly stubborn child who will not study what she did not like". Her mother finally allowed her to choose her own path after she passed her Malaysian Certificate of Education exams with mediocre results (she only excelled in English Literature and History).

Wani was the first in her large conventional family to pursue arts and literature. In an effort to better appreciate her Javanese ancestry from Salatiga, she began to use the name Guritno Purwakanti as her pseudonym.

== Education and career ==
Upon finishing her undergraduate degree in performing arts and screen arts with first-class honours, Wani subsequently functioned as a scriptwriter at Red Communications. Working alongside host-writer-actress Rafidah Abdullah, she wrote scripts for a few episodes of Gol & Gincu The Series, Goda, and the kids program Number Squad. She did captioning for a few episodes of 3R, Sadiq & Co., Breeze Padang Pintar, as well as subtitling for the film KAMI The Movie under Redfilms. She then became a lecturer at Kuala Lumpur Metropolitan University College, teaching film studies and basic English language. Later she moved on to Universiti Teknologi MARA, teaching scriptwriting, fiction writing, poetry, and lyrics.

Wani completed her postgraduate degree in creative writing at Macquarie University.

== Music and literature ==
Wani started writing short stories at the age of seven, penning poems, lyrics, and melody at the age of 16. She has been performing her original songs since 2002, both individually and in groups within South East Asia.

While citing KT Tunstall, Sia, Portishead, The Swell Season, and Padi as her inspirations, Wani singled out Cat Stevens as her personal idol.

Her earliest musical companion was Shukor Fuad, with whom she had a band named Boneca. Their single "Cela" (sung by vocalist Nazila Abu Zaidi, written and composed by Wani) grew quite popular and was aired by various local radio stations without their consent. Today her sessionist is her band WIDYA, which was formerly known as Wani Ardy & The Guitar Polygamy. They have represented Malaysia at various festivals in Singapore, Indonesia, and Australia.

Her songs were briefly featured in the drama series Blogger Boy and the reality drama Gadis Semasa Sunsilk.

In 2011, Wani's song "Hujan" was selected to be played throughout the month of May on Dandelion Radio, an internet radio station founded in June 2006 with the aim of pursuing the musical legacy of the popular and influential BBC Radio 1 disc jockey John Peel. The station takes its name from the British record label Dandelion Records, founded and run by Peel between 1969 and 1972.

At the end of the same year, Wani wrote and composed a couple of songs for a musical staged at the Kuala Lumpur Performing Arts Center. Produced by Dato' Faridah Merican and directed by Joe Hasham, Malaysian Girls was dubbed "the year's most glamorous musical" and received positive feedback from media, critics and theatergoers in general. Her songs "What Is This Feeling" and "Now You See Me, Now You See Me More" were recorded and compiled in the soundtrack album. She wrote for Teater Muzikal Tan Sri Arshad Ayub (2013) and Opera Puteri Saadong (2015) as well.

Wani also teaches creative writing through a series of poetry workshops called Pondok Puisi with Fazleena Hishamuddin, and organises a book and art market called Pasar Boco. She is the editor-in-chief of CQ Magazine, Malaysia's online bilingual creative writing magazine, which has been downloaded by readers from all over the world.

After joining a group of women writers for an anthology in 2009, Wani released her own collection of poems and prose; Langit Vanilla in 2011. Abdul Ghafar Ibrahim, winner of the 2005 Southeast Asian Writers Award, described her writings as "honest, vertically heavy, effective, energetic, synergetic, authentic, unpretentious and filled with strong messages." She continues to publish her writings through Eksotikata and Mesin Cahaya Masa (2014), Melompat Keluar Dari Mimpi (2015), Untuk Yang Telah Pergi (2016), IKHLAS (2017), Hujan Bakawali di Rumah Tuhan as well as Tukang Puisi (2018).

== Personal life ==
Admitting that her guitar and vocal skills are "extremely basic" while saying that writing is something that she "cannot escape from", Wani names being a storyteller as her top priority. She outlines music as "my escapism, my therapy."

In 2010, she decided to don the headscarf on stage, which led to criticism and speculation, mainly comparing her to Yuna. When approached by Esquire Malaysia about this, Wani replied, "I really can't afford to spend my time satisfying people who have already decided to stereotype me. All I can do is pray and hope that they would see what's in my head rather than what's on my head."

Wani was diagnosed with Rokitansky syndrome at the age of 18; this is a congenital disorder that happens to one in every 4,500 to 5,000 women.

== Discography ==
- Senikatawati, EP (2008)
- Meanwhile, EP (2010)
- Langit Vanilla / Sekarang Aku Tahu, single album (2012)

== Appearances ==
- Tiga Venus, compilation (2009), artists: Ana Raffali, Fynn Jamal, Wani Ardy
- Mighty Melody: Malaysia Indie Scene, compilation (2011), artists: Yuna, Liyana Fizi, Wani Ardy, Ferns, Furniture, Love/Comes, The Hollows, Couple, Nicestupidplayground, Khottal, Romancesa, The Sofa Sessions, The Drives, Crashin' Butterfliez, Poppy, The Fridays

== Publications ==
- Perempuan Simpanan (women writers anthology), Sindiket Soljah, 2009
- Langit Vanilla (collection of prose and poems), Sang Freud Press, 2011
- Eksotikata Musim Dua (anthology), Eksotikata, 2014
- Mesin Cahaya Masa (collection of prose and poems), Sang Freud Press, 2014
- Melompat Keluar Dari Mimpi (anthology), KataPilar Books, 2015
- Untuk Yang Telah Pergi (anthology), Rumah Ripta, 2016
- IKHLAS (illustrated memoir of conversations), Rumah Ripta, 2017
- Hujan Bakawali di Rumah Tuhan (anthology), Rumah Ripta, 2018
- Tukang Puisi (anthology), Katapilar Books, 2018
