= Erik Blomqvist (athlete) =

Swedish athletics competitor

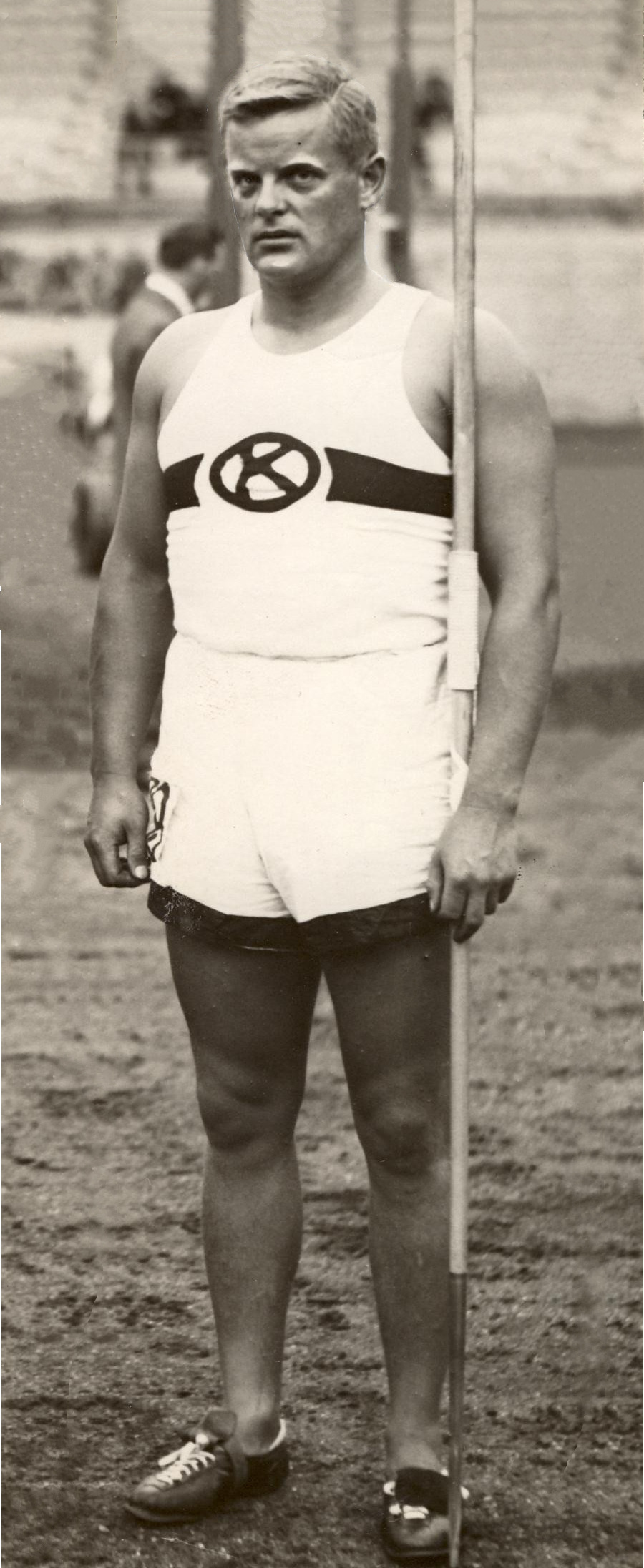

Personal information
- Born: 4 November 1896 Stockholm, Sweden
- Died: 14 January 1967 (aged 70) Stockholm, Sweden
- Height: 1.86 m (6 ft 1 in)
- Weight: 81 kg (179 lb)

Sport
- Sport: Athletics
- Events: Shot put, javelin throw, decathlon
- Club: Kronobergs IK, Stockholm

Achievements and titles
- Personal bests: SP – 13.03 m (1926); JT – 62.38 m (1924); Dec – 6434 (1918)

Erik Berthild Ruben "Blomman" Blomqvist (4 November 1896 – 14 January 1967) was a Swedish track and field athlete who competed at the 1920 and 1924 Summer Olympics. In 1920 he finished eighth in the javelin throw and 16th in the shot put. Four years later he placed sixth in the javelin throw. Blomqvist won the national javelin title in 1915, 1916, 1922, 1923, 1925 and 1929, finishing second or third in between.
