= Väinö Siikaniemi =

Athletics competitor

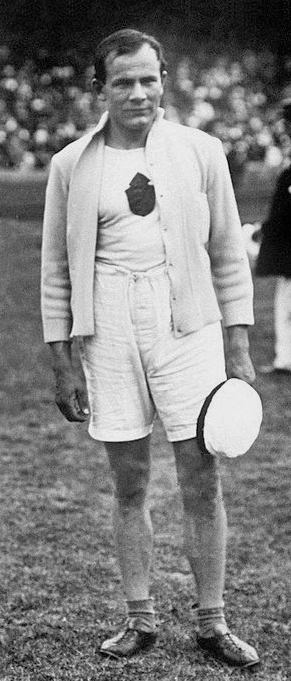
- Siikaniemi at the 1912 Olympics

Personal information
- Full name: Väinö Villiam Siikaniemi
- Born: 27 March 1887 Hollola, Päijät-Häme, Finland
- Died: 24 August 1932 (aged 45) Helsinki, Finland
- Height: 1.82 m (6 ft 0 in)
- Weight: 83 kg (183 lb)

Sport
- Sport: Athletics
- Event: Javelin throw
- Club: HKV, Helsinki

Achievements and titles
- Personal best: 54.09 (1912)
Medal record
Representing Finland
Olympic Games
Silver medal – second place	1912 Stockholm	Two-handed javelin throw

Väinö Villiam Siikaniemi (27 March 1887 – 24 August 1932) was a Finnish athlete who competed at the 1912 Summer Olympics. He finished fifth in the conventional javelin throw and won the silver medal in the two-handed javelin throw, a one-time Olympic event in which the total was counted as a sum of best throws with the right hand and with the left hand.

Siikaniemi retired from sports after the 1912 Games and became a math teacher, poet and translator. In 1923, he published his first poem and in 1929, a collection of poetry. In 1916, he married singer Oili Silventoinen (1888–1932) and later wrote lyrics for songs. He died of pneumonia, aged 45. It was said that he caught a cold during a marathon swim, which he took in an attempt to fight depression caused by the sudden death of his wife two weeks earlier.
