= Carlo Clemente =

Italian javelin thrower

Personal information
- Nationality: Italian
- Born: 2 April 1903 Verona, Italy
- Died: 18 May 1944 (aged 41) Rome, Italy

Sport
- Country: Italy (ITA)
- Sport: Athletics
- Event: Javelin throw
Medal record
International Universities Championships
Gold medal – first place	1923 Paris	Javelin throw

Carlo Clemente (2 April 1903 – 18 May 1944) was an Italian javelin thrower who competed at the 1924 Summer Olympics at the age of 21, where he ranked 14th.
