= Oprando Bottura =

Italian javelin thrower

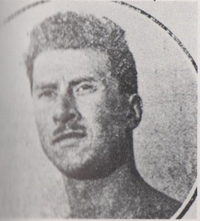

Personal information
- Nationality: Italian
- Born: 25 January 1896 Villa Poma, Italy
- Died: 6 October 1961 (aged 65) Villa Poma, Italy

Sport
- Country: Italy
- Sport: Athletics
- Event: Javelin throw
- Club: Virtus Bologna

Achievements and titles
- Personal best: Javelin throw: 52.70 m (1922)

Oprando Bottura (25 January 1896 – 6 October 1961) was an Italian athlete who competed in the 1920 Summer Olympics. In 1920 he finished 17th in the javelin throw competition.

== Achievements ==
Year	Competition	Venue	Position	Event	Performance	Note
1920	Olympic Games	(Belgium) Antwerp	17th	Javelin throw	42.70 m	
