= Erik Lundqvist =

Swedish javelin thrower

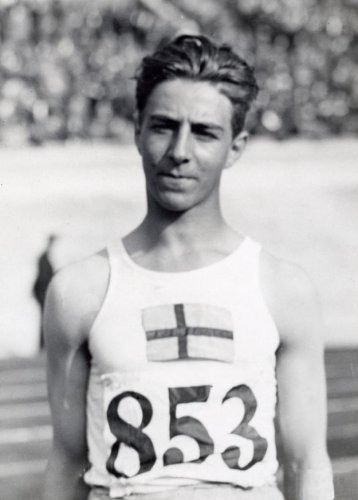
- Erik Lundqvist at the 1928 Olympics

Personal information
- Nationality: Swedish
- Born: 29 June 1908 Grängesberg, Sweden
- Died: 7 January 1963 (aged 54) Grängesberg, Sweden
- Height: 1.87 m (6 ft 2 in)
- Weight: 83 kg (183 lb)

Sport
- Country: Sweden
- Sport: Athletics
- Event: Javelin throw
- Club: IFK Grängesberg

Achievements and titles
- Personal best: 71.16 m (1936)
Medal record
Representing Sweden
Olympic Games
Gold medal – first place	1928 Amsterdam	Javelin throw

Erik Hjalmar Lundqvist (29 June 1908 – 7 January 1963) was a Swedish athlete who won a gold medal in the javelin throw at the 1928 Summer Olympics. Two weeks later he became the first man to break the 70 m barrier, setting a new world record at 71.01 m.
