= Gunnar Lindström =

Swedish javelin thrower

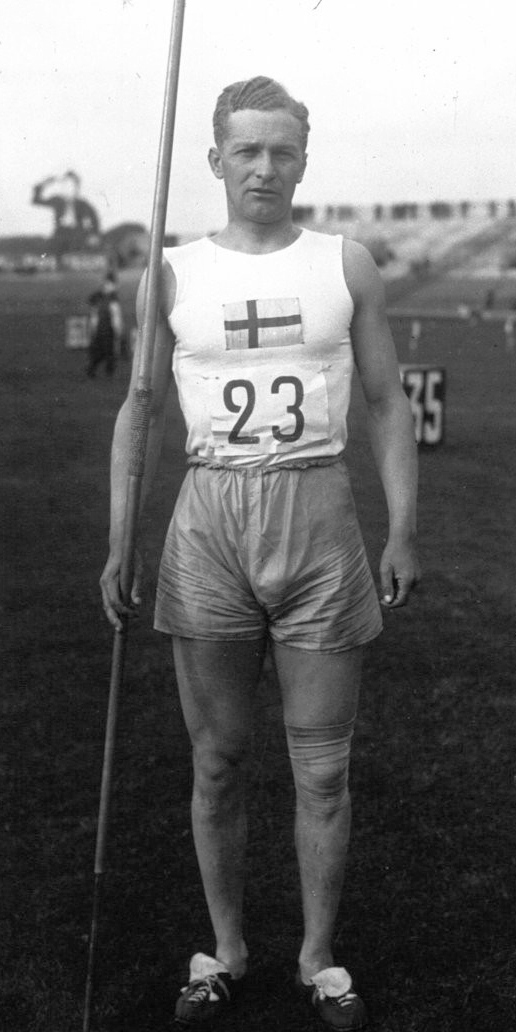
- Gunnar Lindström in 1926

Personal information
- Born: 11 February 1896 Eksjö, Sweden
- Died: 6 October 1951 (aged 55) Eksjö, Sweden
- Height: 1.72 m (5 ft 8 in)

Sport
- Sport: Athletics
- Event: Javelin throw
- Club: Malmö AI; Eksjö GIK

Achievements and titles
- Personal best: 67.77 m (1928)
Medal record
Representing Sweden
Olympic Games
Silver medal – second place	1924 Paris	Javelin throw

Nils Gunnar Lindström (11 February 1896 – 6 October 1951) was a Swedish javelin thrower.

== Career ==
Lindström competed at the 1920, 1924 and 1928 Summer Olympics and finished in sixth, second and fourteenth place, respectively. His younger brother Elof was also an Olympic javelin thrower.

On 12 October 1924, Lindström set a world record of 66.62 m, which stood for three years. During his athletics career, he won six national titles, in the conventional and two-handed javelin throw, in 1920, 1921, 1924 (2), 1926, and 1927. After retiring, he worked as an agricultural consultant and owned a farm outside Eksjö.

Lindström won the British AAA Championships title in the javelin event at the 1921 AAA Championships.

Records
Preceded by (Finland) Jonni Myyrä	Men's Javelin World Record Holder; 12 December 1924 – 1 October 1927	Succeeded by (Finland) Eino Penttilä
