= Béla Szepes =

Hungarian athlete, skier, graphic designer, journalist

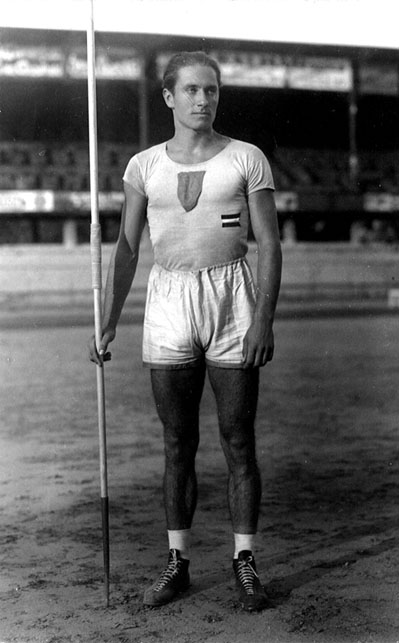
- Szepes at the 1928 Olympics

Personal information
- Nationality: Hungarian
- Born: 5 September 1903 Spišská Nová Ves, Košice, Slovakia in
- Died: 20 June 1986 (aged 82) Budapest, Hungary
- Height: 178 cm (5 ft 10 in)
- Weight: 71 kg (157 lb)

Sport
- Sport: Athletics
- Event: javelin
- Club: MAC, Budapest
Medal record
Men's athletics
Representing Hungary
Olympic Games
Silver medal – second place	1928 Amsterdam	Javelin throw

Béla Miklós Szepes (né Strauch; 5 September 1903 – 20 June 1986) was a Hungarian skier, athlete, graphic designer and journalist. He competed at the 1924 Winter Olympics and won the silver medal in the javelin throw in the 1928 Summer Olympics. He captured seven Hungarian Athletics Championships and three British Athletics Championships titles.

Later Szepes had a successful career as a graphic artist, becoming an influential sports cartoonist in Hungary.

== Early life and sporting career ==
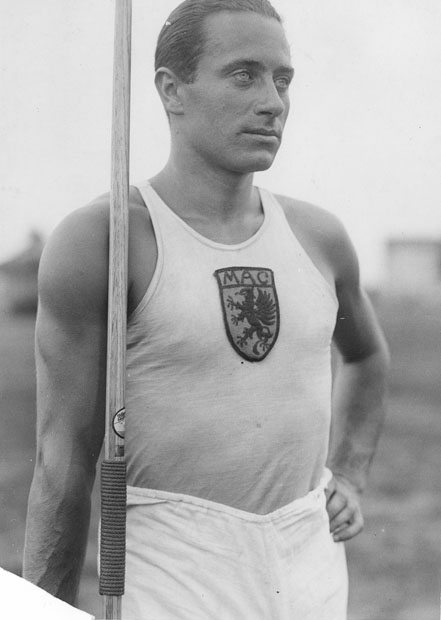
Béla Szepes at the 1928 Summer Olympics

Szepes was born in Igló, Austria-Hungary (today Spišská Nová Ves, Slovakia) in 1903 and began skiing by the Magyar Turista Egylet in 1918. Five years later he became the first ever Hungarian champion in ski jumping on a hill that was built by the jumpers themselves. He broke the Hungarian record in ski jumping six times during his career, having set his personal best in 1927 with 57 metres.

At the 1924 Winter Olympics he participated in the 18 kilometre cross-country skiing event and in the Nordic combined but did not finish either of the races.

Between 1919 and 1931 he was the athlete of Magyar Atétikai Club (MAC), competing in javelin throw. One of the most successful javelin thrower of his time, he won the Hungarian championships seven times in a row from 1925 to 1931. Szepes also set five national records during this period, having achieved his best in 1930 with 66.70 metres.

He also regularly participated at the British Athletics Championships, winning the javelin event on three occasions at the 1925 AAA Championships, 1927 AAA Championships and the 1929 AAA Championships.

In 1928 he was present at the Summer Olympics in Amsterdam, where he came second behind Erik Lundqvist with 65.26 metres.

== Later life ==
Szepes studied at the University of Arts and Design in Budapest. Following his graduation in 1926, Szepes moved to Berlin where he worked for several papers as a journalist and cartoonist. He returned to Hungary in 1933 and took a ski instructor job, was the coach of the Hungarian athletics team between 1938 and 1941 and also contributed to Nemzeti Sport (1933–1941) and later to Képes Sport (1941–1944) as a reporter and editor.

After World War II he continued his career as a freelance graphic artist; his drawings and caricatures were published in Népsport, Ludas Matyi and Füles, and made a number of book illustrations. From the 1960s he turned to sculpting and designed sports awards and trophies. Among his notable works are the trophy of the Athletic European Cup made in 1965 and the Fair Play Award of West Germany from 1972. His creations were displayed in many cities around the globe, including Dresden, Munich, Rotterdam and Montreal.

Szepes died in Budapest in 1986. His caricatures, graphics and posters are on display in the Physical Education and Sports Museum in Budapest, Hungary.

== Personal life ==
Béla Szepes met his wife Mária in 1925, and the two were married on December 24, 1930. The couple had one son, who died when he was seven months old.
