= Julius Saaristo =

Finnish athletics competitor

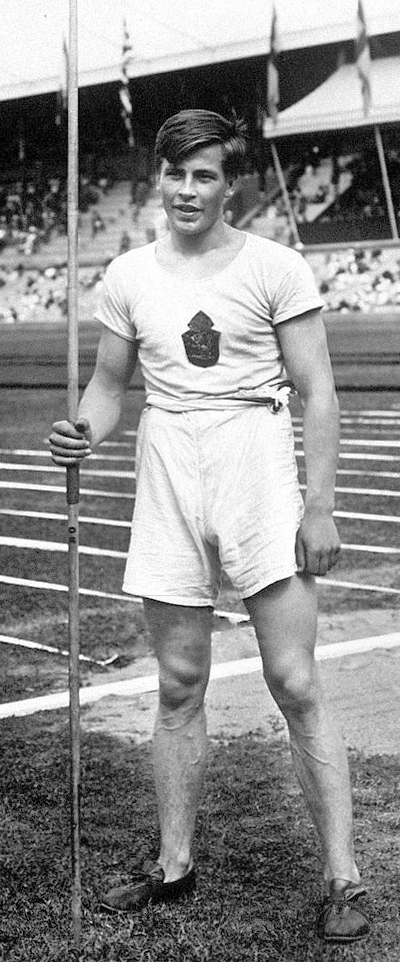
- Saaristo at the 1912 Olympics

Personal information
- Nationality: Finnish
- Born: Juho Julius Saaristo; 21 July 1891 Tampere, Finland
- Died: 12 October 1969 (aged 78) Tampere, Finland
- Height: 1.81 m (5 ft 11 in)
- Weight: 81 kg (179 lb)

Sport
- Sport: Athletics
- Events: Javelin throw, shot put, pole vault
- Club: Viipurin Urheilijat, Helsinki; Tampereen Pyrintö, Tampere

Achievements and titles
- Personal bests: JT – 62.85 m (1920); SP – 12.62 m (1911); PV – 3.35 m (1911)
Medal record
Representing Finland
Olympic Games
Gold medal – first place	1912 Stockholm	Two-handed javelin throw
Silver medal – second place	1912 Stockholm	Javelin throw

Juho Julius Saaristo (21 July 1891 – 12 October 1969) was a Finnish track and field athlete. He won two medals at the 1912 Olympics: a silver in conventional javelin throw and gold in the two-handed javelin throw, a one-time Olympic event in which the total was a sum of best throws with the right hand and with the left hand. He finished fourth in the javelin throw at the 1920 Olympics. Saaristo held the Finnish national title in the javelin in 1910, 1911 and 1919.

== Biography ==
Saaristo was born to Kaarlo Saaristo (Lindholm) and Wilhelmina Lindberg. He studied at the Tampere Industrial School in 1909–12, and from 1912 to 1915, studied machinery and electrical engineering at the Mitweida Technicum and the Strelitz Technicum (now Technical School of Civil Engineering Neustrelitz) in Germany. In 1915, he enlisted in the German Army and was assigned to the 27th Jäger Battalion. He fought in World War I on the Eastern Front at the Misa River and the Gulf of Riga. On 25 February 1918, he returned to Finland and took part in the ongoing Finnish Civil War as a commanding officer. He then continued serving with the Finnish Army, fought in World War II, and was discharged from service after the war ended. He died of throat cancer, though he was not a smoker himself.

In 1928, Saaristo married Olga Lydia Honkanen, and they had two sons and adopted a daughter.
