= Jonni Myyrä =

Finnish athletics competitor (1892–1955)

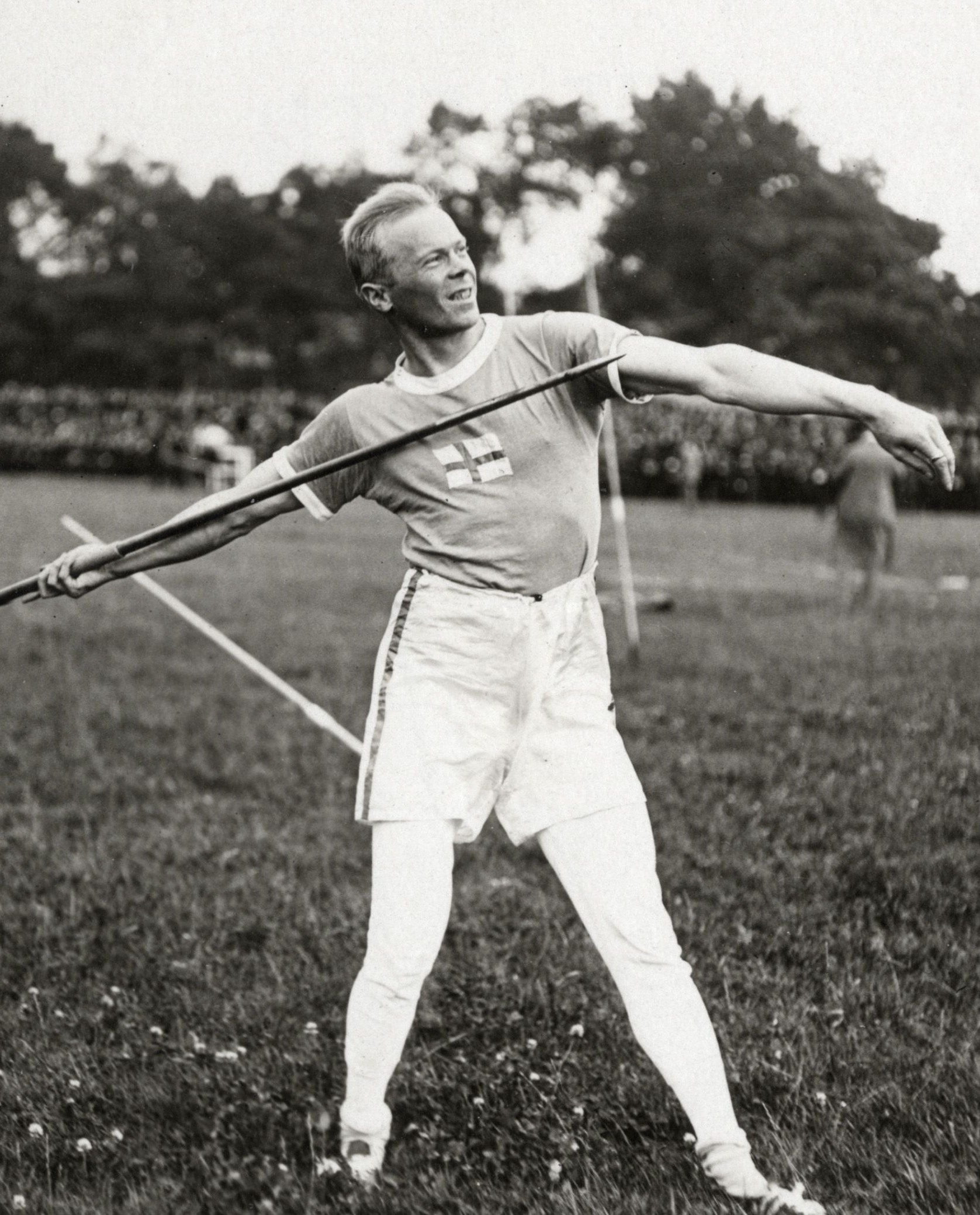
- Jonni Myyrä at the 1920 Olympics

Personal information
- Full name: Joonas Myyrä
- Nickname: "Jonni"
- Nationality: Finland
- Born: 13 July 1892 Savitaipale, Viipuri Province, Grand Duchy of Finland
- Died: 22 January 1955 (aged 62) San Francisco, United States
- Height: 1.86 m (6 ft 1 in)
- Weight: 80 kg (176 lb)

Sport
- Sport: Javelin throw, discus throw, pentathlon
- Club: Partakosken Into; Savitaipaleen Urheilijat; Lahden Ahkera
Medal record
Olympic Games
Gold medal – first place	1920 Antwerp	Javelin throw
Gold medal – first place	1924 Paris	Javelin throw

Joonas "Jonni" Myyrä (13 July 1892 – 22 January 1955) was a Finnish athlete who competed at the 1912, 1920 and 1924 Olympics. In 1912, he finished eighth in the javelin throw. At the 1920 Olympics, his left arm was fractured in a warm-up accident – the spear thrown by James Lincoln struck Myyrä while he was resting on the grass. Nevertheless, Myyrä won the javelin event with an Olympic record of 65.78 meters. He also finished 12th in the discus throw but could not complete his pentathlon events. Myyrä successfully defended his javelin title at the 1924 Summer Olympics and then fled to the United States due to his financial problems in Finland. He never returned to his home country and died in San Francisco in 1955.

He threw one officially ratified world record in the javelin, 66.10 meters in Stockholm on 24 August 1919 and several other performances exceeding the official record at the time that were for various reasons not ratified, including his eventual personal best of 68.55 m achieved in San Francisco on 27 September 1925.
