= 1982 European Athletics Championships – Men's javelin throw =

Men's javelin throw at the European Athletics Championships

These are the official results of the Men's javelin throw event (old design) at the 1982 European Championships in Athens, Greece. There were a total number of 21 competitors. The final was held on 7 September 1982. The qualification mark was set at 80.00 metres.

== Medalists ==
Gold	Uwe Hohn; East Germany (GDR)
Silver	Heino Puuste; Soviet Union (URS)
Bronze	Detlef Michel; East Germany (GDR)

== Schedule ==
- All times are Eastern European Time (UTC+2)

Qualification Round
Group A	Group B
06.09.1982 – 19:45h	06.09.1982 – 19:45h
Final Round
07.09.1982 – 17:30h

== Competitors ==
- European list as of September 5, 1982, just before the start of the competition

Rank	Athlete	Seasons Best	Personal Best
1	Detlef Michel (GDR)	94.52 m	92.48 m
2	Heino Puuste (URS)	90.72 m	89.32 m
4	Pentti Sinersaari (FIN)	89.84 m	93.84 m
5	Uwe Hohn (GDR)	89.86 m	86.56 m
6	Dainis Kūla (URS)	88.40 m	92.06 m
7	Arto Härkönen (FIN)	88.14 m	91.04 m
8	Kenth Eldebrink (SWE)	87.96 m	90.00 m
9	Antero Toivonen (FIN)	87.86 m	88.62 m
12	Klaus Tafelmeier (GER)	87.30 m	89.78 m
13	Dariusz Adamus (POL)	87.24 m	87.24 m
17	Jari Keihäs (SWE)	86.60 m	81.10 m
22	Stefan Stoykov (BUL)	85.72 m	86.24 m
27	David Ottley (GBR)	85.36 m	85.52 m

== Records ==
Standing records prior to the 1982 European Athletics Championships
World Record	Ferenc Paragi (HUN)	96.72 m	April 23, 1980	Tata, Hungary
Event Record	Jānis Lūsis (URS)	91.52 m	September 19, 1969	Athens, Greece

== Qualification ==
Q = automatic qualification; q = qualified by rank; DNS = did not start; NM = no mark; WR = world record; AR = area record; NR = national record; PB = personal best; SB = season best

=== Group A ===
Rank	Athlete	Attempts			Distance
Rank	Athlete	1	2	3	Distance
1	Arto Härkönen (FIN)	71.24	X	86.58	86.58 m
2	Heino Puuste (URS)	74.16	82.76	—	82.76 m
3	Per Erling Olsen (NOR)	X	79.80	82.30	82.30 m
4	Detlef Michel (GDR)	81.66	—	—	81.66 m
5	Agostino Ghesini (ITA)	78.38	80.62	—	80.62 m
6	Dariusz Adamus (POL)	76.08	X	X	76.08 m
7	Jan-Olof Damgren (SWE)	73.46	X	73.36	73.46 m
8	Pentti Sinersaari (FIN)	71.66	X	X	71.66 m
9	Jörgen Jelström (DEN)	70.84	X	69.30	70.84 m
10	Steve Pearson (GBR)	X	X	69.56	69.56 m
—	Jari Keihäs (SWE)	X	X	X	NM

=== Group B ===
Rank	Athlete	Attempts			Distance
Rank	Athlete	1	2	3	Distance
1	Dainis Kūla (URS)	84.18	—	—	84.18 m
2	Uwe Hohn (GDR)	84.14	—	—	84.14 m
3	Kenth Eldebrink (SWE)	X	83.76	—	83.76 m
4	Antero Toivonen (FIN)	82.30	—	—	82.30 m
5	David Ottley (GBR)	X	X	81.24	81.24 m
6	Klaus Tafelmeier (FRG)	77.56	X	81.14	81.14 m
7	Aleksandr Makarov (URS)	79.76	80.74	—	80.74 m
8	Reidar Lorentzen (NOR)	72.10	80.22	—	80.22 m
9	Einar Vilhjálmsson (ISL)	68.56	72.26	67.40	72.26 m
—	Stefan Stoykov (BUL)	X	X	X	NM

== Final ==
Rank	Athlete	Attempts						Distance
Rank	Athlete	1	2	3	4	5	6	Distance
1st place, gold medalist(s)	Uwe Hohn (GDR)	X	87.58	83.24	86.60	91.34	X	91.34 m
2nd place, silver medalist(s)	Heino Puuste (URS)	89.56	X	X	78.20	84.56	X	89.56 m
3rd place, bronze medalist(s)	Detlef Michel (GDR)	X	72.72	84.36	81.36	86.46	89.32	89.32 m
4	Dainis Kūla (URS)	85.88	87.84	X	X	X	84.98	87.84 m
5	Arto Härkönen (FIN)	85.52	83.80	86.76	85.72	84.04	79.84	86.76 m
6	Aleksandr Makarov (URS)	86.08	X	X	84.14	X	78.96	86.08 m
7	Antero Toivonen (FIN)	84.34	81.32	X	81.38	X	X	84.34 m
8	Agostino Ghesini (ITA)	79.92	81.10	78.06	78.50	X	X	81.10 m
9	Reidar Lorentzen (NOR)	X	80.40	X				80.40 m
10	Per Erling Olsen (NOR)	76.80	76.50	79.18				79.18 m
11	Kenth Eldebrink (SWE)	74.90	76.76	X				76.76 m
12	David Ottley (GBR)	X	74.30	75.06				75.06 m
13	Klaus Tafelmeier (FRG)	X	X	70.40				70.40 m

== Participation ==
According to an unofficial count, 21 athletes from 12 countries participated in the event.

- Bulgaria (1)
- Denmark (1)
- East Germany (2)
- Finland (3)
- Iceland (1)
- Italy (1)
- Norway (2)
- Poland (1)
- Soviet Union (3)
- Sweden (3)
- United Kingdom (2)
- West Germany (1)

== See also ==
- 1980 Men's Olympic Javelin Throw (Moscow)
- 1983 Men's World Championships Javelin Throw (Helsinki)
- 1984 Men's Olympic Javelin Throw (Los Angeles)
- 1987 Men's World Championships Javelin Throw (Rome)
- 1988 Men's Olympic Javelin Throw (Seoul)
