= 1983 World Championships in Athletics – Men's javelin throw =

The Men's Javelin Throw event at the 1983 World Championships in Helsinki, Finland had a total number of 18 participating athletes, with the final held on 12 August 1983. All results were made with old rules javelin. The qualification mark was set at 84.00 metres.

== Medalists ==
Gold	Detlef Michel; East Germany (GDR)
Silver	Tom Petranoff; United States (USA)
Bronze	Dainis Kūla; Soviet Union (URS)

== Schedule ==
- All times are Eastern European Time (UTC+2)

Qualification Round
Group A	Group B
10.08.1983 – 10:00h	10.08.1983 – 11:40h
Final Round
12.08.1983 – 18:55h

== Abbreviations ==
- All results shown are in metres

Q	automatic qualification
q	qualification by rank
DNS	did not start
NM	no mark
WR	world record
AR	area record
NR	national record
PB	personal best
SB	season best

== Startlist ==
- World list as of August 6, 1983, just before the start of the competition
- Competing at the 1983 World Athletics Championships

Rank	Athlete	Seasons Best	Personal Best
1	Tom Petranoff (USA)	99.72 m	88.40 m
2	Detlef Michel (GDR)	96.72 m	94.52 m
3	Heino Puuste (URS)	94.20 m	90.72 m
4	Dainis Kūla (URS)	91.88 m	92.06 m
5	Klaus Tafelmeier (FRG)	91.44 m	89.78 m
6	Koos van der Merwe (RSA)	91.24 m	88.62 m
7	Pentti Sinersaari (FIN)	90.90 m	93.84 m
8	Einar Vilhjálmsson (ISL)	90.66 m	81.22 m
9	Mike O'Rourke (NZL)	90.58 m	89.58 m
10	Mike Barnett (USA)	90.36 m	80.86 m
11	Per Erling Olsen (NOR)	90.30 m	88.02 m
12	Jorma Markus (FIN)	89.72 m	90.18 m
13	Agostino Ghesini (ITA)	89.12 m	82.52 m
14	Vasiliy Yershov (URS)	89.02 m	89.00 m
15	Rod Ewaliko (USA)	88.50 m	88.70 m
16	Viktor Yevsyukov (URS)	88.10 m	87.50 m
17	Ramón González (CUB)	87.90 m	75.02 m
18	Raimo Manninen (FIN)	87.86 m	87.58 m
19	Arto Härkönen (FIN)	87.80 m	91.04 m
20	Dariusz Adamus (POL)	87.54 m	87.24 m
21	Stanisław Górak (POL)	87.40 m	84.08 m
22	Aimo Aho (FIN)	87.28 m	89.42 m
23	Esa Utriainen (FIN)	87.28 m	90.94 m
24	Janis Zirnis (URS)	87.20 m	89.48 m
25	Kenth Eldebrink (SWE)	86.86 m	90.00 m
26	Herman Potgieter (RSA)	86.78 m	88.62 m
27	Gerald Weiß (GDR)	86.28 m	89.56 m
28	Laslo Babits (CAN)	86.08 m	84.88 m

== Records ==
Standing records prior to the 1983 World Athletics Championships
World Record	Tom Petranoff (USA)	99.72 m	May 15, 1983	Los Angeles, United States
Event Record	New event			
Season Best	Tom Petranoff (USA)	99.72 m	May 15, 1983	Los Angeles, United States

== Qualification ==
=== Group A ===
Rank	Overall	Athlete	Attempts			Distance
Rank	Overall	Athlete	1	2	3	Distance
1	2	Klaus Tafelmeier (FRG)	X	88.86	—	88.86 m
2	5	Tom Petranoff (USA)	85.68	—	—	85.68 m
3	8	Esa Utriainen (FIN)	76.18	84.22	—	84.22 m
4	9	Dainis Kūla (URS)	78.58	X	83.16	83.16 m
5	11	Rod Ewaliko (USA)	82.68	79.38	76.46	82.68 m
6	12	Aimo Aho (FIN)	72.60	81.92	79.66	81.92 m
7	13	Einar Vilhjálmsson (ISL)	81.72	77.08	X	81.72 m
8	17	Zakayo Malekwa (TAN)	72.92	X	72.80	72.92 m
9	18	Trevor Modeste (GRN)	X	51.84	X	51.84 m

=== Group B ===
Rank	Overall	Athlete	Attempts			Distance
Rank	Overall	Athlete	1	2	3	Distance
1	1	Detlef Michel (GDR)	90.40	—	—	90.40 m
2	3	Bob Roggy (USA)	73.30	86.16	—	86.16 m
3	4	Heino Puuste (URS)	82.18	85.86	—	85.86 m
4	6	Kenth Eldebrink (SWE)	85.64	—	—	85.64 m
5	7	Zdeněk Adamec (TCH)	83.42	84.54	—	84.54 m
6	10	Per Erling Olsen (NOR)	82.72	X	83.10	83.10 m
7	14	Arto Härkönen (FIN)	81.42	80.22	77.76	81.42 m
8	15	Mike O'Rourke (NZL)	75.32	X	X	75.32 m
9	16	Laslo Babits (CAN)	74.16	X	X	74.16 m

== Final ==
Rank	Athlete	Attempts						Distance
Rank	Athlete	1	2	3	4	5	6	Distance
1st place, gold medalist(s)	Detlef Michel (GDR)	88.96	89.48	88.74	X	X	86.70	89.48 m
2nd place, silver medalist(s)	Tom Petranoff (USA)	80.38	85.60	85.30	X	X	X	85.60 m
3rd place, bronze medalist(s)	Dainis Kūla (URS)	85.58	80.70	82.78	82.42	83.08	X	85.58 m
4	Heino Puuste (URS)	77.04	78.86	84.56	79.00	70.16	81.66	84.56 m
5	Per Erling Olsen (NOR)	X	81.72	83.54	77.60	74.92	X	83.54 m
6	Kenth Eldebrink (SWE)	83.28	78.84	X	78.94	X	77.26	83.28 m
7	Zdeněk Adamec (TCH)	81.30	X	X	X	75.62	X	81.30 m
8	Klaus Tafelmeier (FRG)	75.06	80.42	X	X	X	X	80.42 m
9	Bob Roggy (USA)	79.84	78.02	74.82				79.84 m
10	Aimo Aho (FIN)	79.34	X	78.08				79.34 m
11	Rod Ewaliko (USA)	76.58	76.46	77.74				77.74 m
12	Esa Utriainen (FIN)	X	76.66	X				76.66 m

== See also ==
- 1980 Men's Olympic Javelin Throw (Moscow)
- 1982 Men's European Championships Javelin Throw (Athens)
- 1984 Men's Olympic Javelin Throw (Los Angeles)
- 1986 Men's European Championships Javelin Throw (Stuttgart)
