= Athletics at the 1980 Summer Olympics – Men's javelin throw =

Men's javelin throw at the Games of the XXII Olympiad
- Venue: Lenin Stadium
- Dates: July 26–27
- Competitors: 18 from 11 nations
- Winning distance: 91.20

Medalists
1st place, gold medalist(s)		Dainis Kūla; Soviet Union
2nd place, silver medalist(s)		Aleksandr Makarov; Soviet Union
3rd place, bronze medalist(s)		Wolfgang Hanisch; East Germany

The men's javelin throw event at the 1980 Summer Olympics in Moscow, Soviet Union had 18 competitors in one qualifying group. The qualifying round was staged on July 26, with the automatic qualifying mark set at 80.00 metres (262.47 ft). Twelve advanced to the final, which took place the following day.

The Soviet Union's Dainis Kūla and Aleksandr Makarov won gold and silver, amid allegations that Soviet officials had favored their own athletes.

== Competition ==
=== Qualification ===
The qualification was held in rainy conditions, and several favorites had difficulties getting through. All three Soviet throwers and Hungary's defending champion Miklós Németh reached the automatic qualifying mark (80.00 m) in the first round, but the other Hungarian, Ferenc Paragi, who had broken the world record earlier in 1980, only got a good throw in the third and final qualification round, and East Germany's Detlef Michel, who was one of the favorites and would win the World Championship in 1983, failed to qualify.

Only ten athletes reached the automatic qualification mark, so Detlef Fuhrmann and Stefan Stoykov qualified despite not reaching the mark.

=== Final ===
The favorites in the final were Paragi, the three Soviets and East Germany's Wolfgang Hanisch, a three-time medalist at European Championships. Hanisch was an early leader after throwing 86.72 m in the first round, closely followed by two Soviets, Heino Puuste and Makarov, and Finland's Antero Puranen. Paragi had problems with his technique and failed to get a good throw, and the third Soviet thrower, Dainis Kūla, had no valid mark after two rounds.

In the third round Paragi got his best throw, 79.52 m, but it wasn't enough to move him to the top eight that would qualify for rounds four to six. Kūla, on the other hand, stayed in the competition as his third throw was measured as 88.88 m and he took the lead.

In round four Kūla improved further to 91.20 m, the eventual winning distance. Makarov got his best throws in rounds five and six and took silver ahead of Hanisch.

== Controversy ==
=== Kūla's third throw ===
Dainis Kūla's third throw immediately became controversial as it landed almost completely flat (rather than point first), and a flat throw should have been ruled illegal; had that ruling been made, Kūla would have been out of the last three rounds. It was also claimed the throw's distance had been exaggerated, with the actual distance being around 87 m.

Flat or ambiguously flat throws were not uncommon with the old javelin designs then used, nor were "generous" judgments by officials. Kūla's case, however, gained much notoriety as it not only secured him Olympic gold, but fit into a wider pattern of Soviet officials favoring their own athletes at the 1980 Olympics.

=== Opening the gates ===
Another controversy surrounded Soviet officials opening the stadium's gates when Soviet athletes were throwing, letting more wind in to aid the throws. In Finland (which had three athletes in the final), the gate issue spurred much discussion and lived on in public memory for a long time; Kūla was greeted with shouts of "open the gates!" when he competed in the 1983 World Championships in the Finnish capital, Helsinki, and when the 2013 World Championships were held in Moscow the gate controversy again became a talking point.

=== Outcome ===
In the media of javelin-crazy Finland, the usually friendly attitude towards the Soviet Union was seriously dented by the javelin final as mainstream newspapers criticized the officials. Jim Dunaway, writing for the American magazine Track & Field News, was even more negative in opining that "the competition should be voided by the IAAF and either held again at some future date, or removed from the Olympic records." However, no official complaints or protests were filed, and the original results were allowed to stand.

== Medalists ==
Gold	Dainis Kūla; Soviet Union
Silver	Aleksandr Makarov; Soviet Union
Bronze	Wolfgang Hanisch; East Germany

== Schedule ==
- All times are Moscow Time (UTC+3)

Qualification Round
26.07.1980 – 12:25h
Final Round
27.07.1980 – 17:15h

== Abbreviations ==
- All results shown are in metres

Q	automatic qualification
q	qualification by rank
DNS	did not start
NM	no mark
OR	olympic record
WR	world record
AR	area record
NR	national record
PB	personal best
SB	season best

== Records ==
Standing records prior to the 1980 Summer Olympics
World Record	Ferenc Paragi (HUN)	96.72 m	April 23, 1980	Tata, Hungary
Olympic Record	Miklós Németh (HUN)	94.58 m	July 25, 1976	Montreal, Canada

== Qualification ==
Rank	Athlete	Attempts			Distance
Rank	Athlete	1	2	3	Distance
1	Ferenc Paragi (HUN)	X	72.60	88.76	88.76 m
2	Wolfgang Hanisch (GDR)	75.24	85.82	—	85.82 m
3	Dainis Kūla (URS)	85.76	—	—	85.76 m
4	Miklós Németh (HUN)	84.84	—	—	84.84 m
5	Antero Puranen (FIN)	74.78	84.02	—	84.02 m
6	Aleksandr Makarov (URS)	83.32	—	—	83.32 m
7	Heino Puuste (URS)	82.96	—	—	82.96 m
8	Justin Arop (UGA)	63.02	76.64	82.68	82.68 m
9	Aimo Aho (FIN)	70.84	78.50	82.12	82.12 m
10	Pentti Sinersaari (FIN)	X	80.30	—	80.30 m
11	Detlef Fuhrmann (GDR)	72.12	X	78.80	78.80 m
12	Stefan Stoykov (BUL)	70.62	78.74	71.00	78.74 m
13	Detlef Michel (GDR)	73.30	78.34	X	78.34 m
14	David Ottley (GBR)	X	77.20	71.94	77.20 m
15	Dariusz Adamus (POL)	69.68	75.72	76.82	76.82 m
16	Zakayo Malekwa (TAN)	71.58	X	61.66	71.58 m
17	Inoussa Dangou (BEN)	54.20	63.56	X	63.56 m
18	Milkessa Chalchisa (ETH)	X	51.04	47.68	51.04 m

== Final ==
Rank	Athlete	Attempts						Distance
Rank	Athlete	1	2	3	4	5	6	Distance
1st place, gold medalist(s)	Dainis Kūla (URS)	X	X	88.88	91.20	X	X	91.20 m
2nd place, silver medalist(s)	Aleksandr Makarov (URS)	85.84	83.48	X	84.40	88.04	89.64	89.64 m
3rd place, bronze medalist(s)	Wolfgang Hanisch (GDR)	86.72	73.74	84.04	X	X	X	86.72 m
4	Heino Puuste (URS)	86.10	X	—	X	—	X	86.10 m
5	Antero Puranen (FIN)	85.12	X	X	78.14	X	82.94	85.12 m
6	Pentti Sinersaari (FIN)	75.08	84.34	82.86	X	X	X	84.34 m
7	Detlef Fuhrmann (GDR)	68.44	81.02	81.44	83.50	80.42	80.96	83.50 m
8	Miklós Németh (HUN)	76.60	74.06	81.46	81.38	82.40	76.22	82.40 m
9	Aimo Aho (FIN)	75.82	80.58	78.86				80.58 m
10	Ferenc Paragi (HUN)	X	75.46	79.52				79.52 m
11	Stefan Stoykov (BUL)	77.32	74.38	79.04				79.04 m
12	Justin Arop (UGA)	53.56	77.34	X				77.34 m

== See also ==
- 1976 Men's Olympic Javelin Throw (Montreal)
- 1978 Men's European Championships Javelin Throw (Prague)
- 1980 Javelin Throw Year Ranking
- 1982 Men's European Championships Javelin Throw (Athens)
- 1983 Men's World Championships Javelin Throw (Helsinki)
- 1984 Men's Olympic Javelin Throw (Los Angeles)
- 1984 Men's Friendship Games Javelin Throw (Moscow)
- 1986 Men's European Championships Javelin Throw (Stuttgart)
