= List of javelin throwers =

The javelin throw is an Olympic track and field event. Athletes specialising in the discipline are known as javelin throwers.

== Notable javelin throwers ==
=== Men ===
- Steve Backley, Great Britain
- Edgar Baumann, Paraguay
- Patrik Bodén, Sweden
- Terry Bradshaw, United States
- Al Cantello, United States
- Marius Corbett, South Africa
- Egil Danielsen, Norway
- Konstadinós Gatsioúdis, Greece
- Breaux Greer, United States
- Flint Hanner, United States
- Arto Härkönen, Finland
- Bud Held, United States
- Uwe Hohn, GDR
- Toivo Hyytiäinen, Finland
- Matti Järvinen, Finland
- Jorma Kinnunen, Finland
- Kimmo Kinnunen, Finland
- Tapio Korjus, Finland
- Ainārs Kovals, Latvia
- Dainis Kūla, Soviet Union (Latvia)
- Gergely Kulcsár, Hungary
- Eric Lemming, Sweden
- Jānis Lūsis, Soviet Union (Latvia)
- Sergey Makarov, Russia
- Jonni Myyrä, Finland
- Miklós Németh, Hungary
- Pauli Nevala, Finland
- Yrjö Nikkanen, Finland
- Eugene Oberst, United States
- Aki Parviainen, Finland
- Terje Pedersen, Norway
- Urho Peltonen, Finland
- Tom Petranoff, United States
- Tero Pitkämäki, Finland
- Seppo Räty, Finland
- Tapio Rautavaara, Finland
- Bob Roggy, United States
- Antti Ruuskanen, Finland
- Steve Seymour, United States
- Janusz Sidło, Poland
- Hannu Siitonen, Finland
- Pentti Sinersaari, Finland
- Andreas Thorkildsen, Norway
- Braian Toledo, Argentina
- Andrus Värnik, Estonia
- Vadims Vasiļevskis, Latvia
- Neeraj Chopra, India
- Keshorn Walcott, Trinidad and Tobago
- John Whittemore, United States, world's oldest athlete
- Cy Young, United States
- Jan Železný, Czech Republic
- Arshad Nadeem, Pakistan

=== Women ===
- Sonia Bisset, Cuba
- Lillian Copeland, United States
- Babe Didrikson, United States
- Dorothy Dodson, United States
- Petra Felke, GDR
- Leryn Franco, Paraguay
- Ruth Fuchs, GDR
- Trine Hattestad, Norway
- Kirsten Hellier, New Zealand
- Haruka Kitaguchi, Japan
- Tiina Lillak, Finland
- Mirela Manjani, Greece
- Osleidys Menéndez, Cuba
- Steffi Nerius, Germany
- Christina Obergföll, Germany
- Heli Rantanen, Finland
- Sofia Sakorafa, Greece
- Tessa Sanderson, Great Britain
- Kate Schmidt, United States
- Natalya Shikolenko, Belarus
- Barbora Špotáková, Czech Republic
- Linda Stahl, Germany
- Sunette Viljoen, South Africa
- Fatima Whitbread, Great Britain
- Dana Zátopková, Czechoslovakia

== See also ==
- Category:Javelin throwers (135)
- List of hammer throwers
- List of middle-distance runners
