= Athletics at the 1981 Summer Universiade – Men's javelin throw =

The men's javelin throw event at the 1981 Summer Universiade was held at the Stadionul Naţional in Bucharest on 24 and 26 July 1981.

== Medalists ==
Gold	Silver	Bronze
Dainis Kūla; Soviet Union	Gerald Weiß; East Germany	Heino Puuste; Soviet Union

== Results ==
=== Qualification ===
Rank	Athlete	Nationality	Result	Notes
1	Heino Puuste	Soviet Union	81.70	
2	Dainis Kūla	Soviet Union	81.68	
3	Helmut Schreiber	West Germany	79.94	
4	Reinaldo Patterson	Cuba	79.26	
5	Gerald Weiß	East Germany	78.76	
6	Wolfram Gambke	West Germany	78.38	
7	Matti Napari	Finland	78.18	
8	Raimo Manninen	Finland	76.80	
9	Jari Keihäs	Sweden	76.56	
10	Tudorel Pirvu	Romania	76.38	
11	Dumitru Negoiță	Romania	76.18	
12	István Herédi	Hungary	75.00	
13	Agostino Ghesini	Italy	74.08	
14	Masami Yoshida	Japan	73.90	
15	Shen Maomao	China	73.70	
16	Mike Juskus	United States	72.34	
17	Juan de la Garza	Mexico	71.16	
18	Stefan Stoykov	Bulgaria	68.44	
19	Ibrahim Atia	Lebanon	57.58	
20	Khanai Glempon	Guyana	43.24	

=== Final ===
Rank	Athlete	Nationality	Result	Notes
1st place, gold medalist(s)	Dainis Kūla	Soviet Union	89.52	UR
2nd place, silver medalist(s)	Gerald Weiß	East Germany	87.80	
3rd place, bronze medalist(s)	Heino Puuste	Soviet Union	87.22	
4	Helmut Schreiber	West Germany	82.60	
5	Wolfram Gambke	West Germany	81.44	
6	Reinaldo Patterson	Cuba	81.44	
7	Raimo Manninen	Finland	78.64	
8	Jari Keihäs	Sweden	78.32	
9	István Herédi	Hungary	77.70	
10	Tudorel Pirvu	Romania	77.32	
11	Matti Napari	Finland	77.24	
12	Dumitru Negoiță	Romania	72.86	
