= Athletics at the 1984 Summer Olympics – Men's javelin throw =

Men's javelin throw at the Games of the XXIII Olympiad
- Venue: Los Angeles Memorial Coliseum
- Date: August 4 (qualifications); August 5 (final)
- Competitors: 28 from 19 nations
- Winning distance: 86.76

Medalists
1st place, gold medalist(s)		Arto Härkönen; Finland
2nd place, silver medalist(s)		Dave Ottley; Great Britain
3rd place, bronze medalist(s)		Kenth Eldebrink; Sweden

The Men's Javelin Throw event at the 1984 Summer Olympics in Los Angeles, California, had an entry list of 28 competitors. The final was held on August 5, 1984, and the qualifying round on August 4, 1984, with the qualification mark set at 83.00 metres.

== Medalists ==
Gold	Arto Härkönen; Finland
Silver	David Ottley; Great Britain
Bronze	Kenth Eldebrink; Sweden

== Schedule ==
- All times are Pacific Standard Time (UTC-8)

Qualification Round
Group A	Group B
04.08.1984 – 09:30h	04.08.1984 – 10:30h
Final Round
05.08.1984 – 18:15h

== Abbreviations ==
- All results shown are in metres

Q	automatic qualification
q	qualification by rank
DNS	did not start
NM	no mark
OR	olympic record
WR	world record
AR	area record
NR	national record
PB	personal best
SB	season best

== Records ==
Standing records prior to the 1984 Summer Olympics
World Record	Uwe Hohn (GDR)	104.80 m	July 20, 1984	East Berlin, East Germany
Olympic Record	Miklós Németh (HUN)	94.58 m	July 25, 1976	Montreal, Canada

== Qualification ==
=== Group A ===
Rank	Overall	Athlete	Attempts			Distance
Rank	Overall	Athlete	1	2	3	Distance
1	3	Roald Bradstock (GBR)	79.52	81.08	83.06	83.06 m
2	5	Wolfram Gambke (FRG)	75.10	82.98	X	82.98 m
3	6	Per Erling Olsen (NOR)	82.46	X	X	82.46 m
4	7	Laslo Babits (CAN)	X	76.68	82.18	82.18 m
5	8	Masami Yoshida (JPN)	78.14	81.42	78.06	81.42 m
6	10	Einar Vilhjálmsson (ISL)	79.78	X	80.94	80.94 m
7	11	Jean-Paul Lakafia (FRA)	80.52	66.26	78.02	80.52 m
8	12	Duncan Atwood (USA)	77.08	79.34	X	79.34 m
9	13	Raimo Manninen (FIN)	79.26	X	X	79.24 m
10	14	Juan de la Garza (MEX)	78.80	X	79.16	79.16 m
11	16	Sejad Krdžalić (YUG)	76.52	X	X	76.52 m
12	19	Zakayo Malekwa (TAN)	71.80	X	75.18	75.18 m
13	23	Agostino Ghesini (ITA)	72.16	63.92	72.96	72.96 m
14	27	Justin Arop (UGA)	69.76	66.30	X	69.76 m

=== Group B ===
Rank	Overall	Athlete	Attempts			Distance
Rank	Overall	Athlete	1	2	3	Distance
1	1	Tom Petranoff (USA)	85.96	—	—	85.96 m
2	2	David Ottley (GBR)	85.68	—	—	85.68 m
3	4	Arto Härkönen (FIN)	82.82	83.06	—	83.06 m
4	9	Kenth Eldebrink (SWE)	79.36	81.06	79.42	81.06 m
5	2	Reidar Lorentzen (NOR)	X	68.00	76.62	76.62 m
6	17	Tero Saviniemi (FIN)	X	76.46	X	76.46 m
7	18	Steve Roller (USA)	75.50	75.48	X	75.50 m
8	20	Kazuhiro Mizoguchi (JPN)	74.82	72.58	69.18	74.82 m
9	21	Muhammad Rashid Khan (PAK)	72.48	70.76	74.58	74.58 m
10	22	Klaus Tafelmeier (FRG)	X	X	73.52	73.52 m
11	24	Chen Hung-yen (TPE)	62.46	71.48	68.54	71.48 m
12	25	Gurtej Singh (IND)	63.62	70.08	69.32	70.08 m
13	26	Sigurður Einarsson (ISL)	69.82	66.68	67.02	69.82 m
—	—	Mike O'Rourke (NZL)	X	X	X	NM

== Final ==
Rank	Athlete	Attempts						Distance
Rank	Athlete	1	2	3	4	5	6	Distance
1st place, gold medalist(s)	Arto Härkönen (FIN)	X	78.74	84.34	86.76	X	X	86.76 m
2nd place, silver medalist(s)	David Ottley (GBR)	85.74	81.52	X	X	83.92	84.46	85.74 m
3rd place, bronze medalist(s)	Kenth Eldebrink (SWE)	X	80.28	X	X	83.72	83.30	83.72 m
4	Wolfram Gambke (FRG)	82.00	82.46	X	78.88	X	72.08	82.46 m
5	Masami Yoshida (JPN)	X	81.98	X	81.98	77.92	81.66	81.98 m
6	Einar Vilhjálmsson (ISL)	80.44	77.66	79.22	81.58	X	79.26	81.58 m
7	Roald Bradstock (GBR)	70.20	81.22	78.22	76.68	X	78.82	81.22 m
8	Laslo Babits (CAN)	X	X	80.68	X	X	X	80.68 m
9	Per Erling Olsen (NOR)	73.64	X	78.98				78.98 m
10	Tom Petranoff (USA)	X	X	78.40				78.40 m
11	Duncan Atwood (USA)	72.54	78.10	X				78.10 m
12	Jean-Paul Lakafia (FRA)	X	X	70.86				70.86 m

== See also ==
- 1982 Men's European Championships Javelin Throw (Athens)
- 1983 Men's World Championships Javelin Throw (Helsinki)
- 1984 Men's Friendship Games Javelin Throw (Moscow)
- 1984 Javelin Throw Year Ranking
- 1986 Men's European Championships Javelin Throw (Stuttgart)
- 1987 Men's World Championships Javelin Throw (Rome)
