= IAAF Golden Events =

Series of athletics events

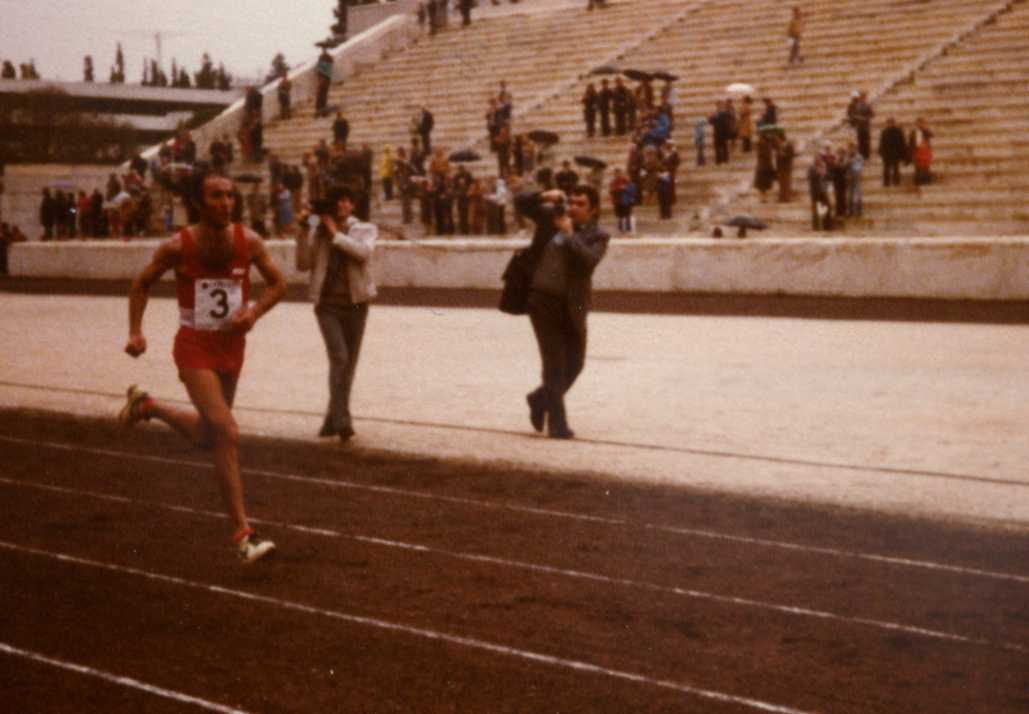
Rodolfo Gómez winning the IAAF Golden Marathon in 1982

The IAAF Golden Events were a sporadic series of twelve athletics events organised by the International Amateur Athletics Federation (IAAF) from 1978 to 1982. Aside from the inaugural event in Tokyo, the contests were held in Europe and were attached to independent track and field meetings. The purpose of the events was to raise the profile of the sport outside of Olympic competition. Marking the growing professionalism in athletics, a significant prize pot was given to the winner of the event – a move designed to attract the sport's top athletes to compete against each other at the same meeting. The inaugural prize was an 18-carat gold trophy worth 9,500 US dollars. All twelve events were for men, reflecting their position as the most prominent sex during that period.

The central element of the series was the Golden Mile – a men's mile run contest that launched the series in 1978 and was held annually until 1981. The rivalry of British runners Steve Ovett and Sebastian Coe in this event saw each take two wins and Coe set two mile world records in the process. British athletes were particularly successful in the series and won eight of the twelve events. A sprint format, aggregating an athlete's times in separate 100 metres and 200 metres, was launched in 1979 and repeated in 1981. Long-distance running was also a major element of the series as it featured one 5000 metres race, two 10,000 metres races, and a marathon race over the series history. Field events were in a minority, with one javelin throw and one pole vault being their only appearance. The marathon, in 1982, was the last Golden Event to be held.

The establishment of the IAAF World Championships in Athletics in 1983 saw the IAAF focus on its sport-specific championships as a way of using prizes to generate top level competition. The launch of the IAAF Grand Prix in 1985 formalised the major track and field circuit as a professional series of point-scoring events. The "Golden" was idea revived in the form of the Golden Four in 1992 – a high-prize money, track and field series comprising Oslo, Zurich, Brussels and Berlin (all venues that had hosted Golden Events). This was later expanded and co-opted by the IAAF in 1998 as the IAAF Golden League, which was itself later expanded to the current major track and field series: the IAAF Diamond League.

Some of the events featured title sponsors: the first event was also known as the "Dubai Golden Mile", given its sponsorship by the emirate, and the final event was also known as the "Citizen Golden Marathon", under the patronage of Japanese watchmakers Citizen Holdings.

== Editions ==
Year	Event	Location	Meet	Winner
1978	Mile run	Tokyo, Japan	Tokyo Eight Nations International	Steve Ovett
1979	100/200 metres	Zürich, Switzerland	Weltklasse Zürich	James Sanford
1979	Mile run	Oslo, Norway	Bislett Games	Sebastian Coe
1979	10,000 metres	Brussels, Belgium	Memorial Van Damme	Mike McLeod
1979	Javelin throw	Budapest, Hungary		Arto Härkönen
1980	Mile run	London, United Kingdom	London Grand Prix	Steve Ovett
1980	Pole vault	Nice, France		Serge Ferreira
1981	100/200 metres	Berlin, West Germany	Internationales Stadionfest	Allan Wells
1981	Mile run	Brussels, Belgium	Memorial Van Damme	Sebastian Coe
1981	5000 metres	Gateshead, United Kingdom	British Grand Prix	Barry Smith
1981	10,000 metres	Prague, Czechoslovakia		Mike McLeod
1982	Marathon	Athens, Greece	n/a	Rodolfo Gómez

== Podium finishers ==
Event	First		Second		Third	
1978 Golden Mile	Steve Ovett (GBR)	3:55.5	Francis Gonzalez (FRA)	3:57.3	Graham Williamson (GBR)	3:59.2
1979 Golden Sprints	James Sanford (USA)	30.54	Allan Wells (GBR)	30.64	James Gilkes (GUY)	30.67
1979 Golden Mile	Sebastian Coe (GBR)	3:48.95 WR	Steve Scott (USA)	3:51.11	Craig Masback (USA)	3:52.02
1979 Golden 10,000 m	Mike McLeod (GBR)	27:39.76	Brendan Foster (GBR)	27:41.23	Léon Schots (BEL)	27:41.34
1979 Golden Javelin	Arto Härkönen (FIN)	90.18	Antero Puranen (FIN)	89.40	Ferenc Paragi (HUN)	85.38
1980 Golden Mile	Steve Ovett (GBR)	3:52.84	Steve Scott (USA)	3:52.92	John Walker (NZL)	3:53.19
1980 Golden Vault	Serge Ferreira (FRA)	5.70 m	Philippe Houvion (FRA)	5.60 m	Mariusz Klimczyk (POL)	5.60 m
1981 Golden Sprints	Allan Wells (GBR)	30.30	Mel Lattany (USA)	30.86	Jeff Phillips (USA)	30.97
1981 Golden Mile	Sebastian Coe (GBR)	3:47.33 WR	Mike Boit (KEN)	3:49.45	Steve Scott (USA)	3:51.48
1981 Golden 5000 m	Barry Smith (GBR)	13:21.14	Tolossa Kotu (ETH)	13:23.95	Bill McChesney (USA)	13:24.66
1981 Golden 10,000 m	Mike McLeod (GBR)	27:59.38	Geoff Smith (GBR)	27:59.43	Nick Rose (GBR)	27:59.68
1982 Golden Marathon	Rodolfo Gómez (MEX)	2:11:49	Vladimir Kotov (URS)	2:13:34	Greg Meyer (USA)	2:14:07
