= 1974 European Athletics Championships – Men's javelin throw =

Men's javelin throw at the European Athletics Championships

The men's javelin throw at the 1974 European Athletics Championships was held in Rome, Italy, at Stadio Olimpico on 7 and 8 September 1974.

== Medalists ==
Gold	Hannu Siitonen; Finland
Silver	Wolfgang Hanisch; East Germany
Bronze	Terje Thorslund; Norway

== Results ==
=== Final ===
8 September

Rank	Name	Nationality	Result	Notes
1st place, gold medalist(s)	Hannu Siitonen	Finland	89.58	
2nd place, silver medalist(s)	Wolfgang Hanisch	East Germany	85.46	
3rd place, bronze medalist(s)	Terje Thorslund	Norway	83.68	
4	Nikolay Grebnyev	Soviet Union	83.66	
5	Klaus Wolfermann	West Germany	83.36	
6	Jānis Lūsis	Soviet Union	83.06	
7	Miklós Németh	Hungary	81.06	
8	Lauri Koski-Vähälä	Sweden	79.92	
9	Aimo Aho	Finland	79.38	
10	György Erdelyi	Hungary	78.06	
11	Dave Travis	Great Britain	75.42	
12	Serge Leroy	France	74.62	
13	Jorma Jaakola	Finland	73.32	
14	Michael Wessing	West Germany	71.68	

=== Qualification ===
7 September

Rank	Group	Name	Nationality	Result	Notes
1	A	Klaus Wolfermann	West Germany	82.64	Q
2	A	Dave Travis	Great Britain	82.38	Q
3	A	Wolfgang Hanisch	East Germany	82.08	Q
4	B	Lauri Koski-Vähälä	Sweden	81.80	Q
5	B	Serge Leroy	France	80.90	Q
6	B	Miklós Németh	Hungary	80.86	Q
7	B	Michael Wessing	West Germany	80.56	Q
8	A	Terje Thorslund	Norway	80.10	Q
9	B	Hannu Siitonen	Finland	79.70	Q
10	B	Nikolay Grebnyev	Soviet Union	79.48	Q
11	A	György Erdelyi	Hungary	79.10	Q
12	A	Jānis Lūsis	Soviet Union	78.44	Q
13	A	Jorma Jaakola	Finland	78.40	Q
14	B	Aimo Aho	Finland	78.38	Q
15	?	Aleksandr Makarov	Soviet Union	77.92	
16	?	Milco Milenski	Bulgaria	77.10	
17	?	Horst Timmer	West Germany	75.08	
18	?	Renzo Cramerotti	Italy	73.54	
19	?	Lolésio Tuita	France	68.86	
	?	Brian Roberts	Great Britain	NM	
	?	Valentin Dzhonev	Bulgaria	DNS	
	?	Raimo Pihl	Sweden	DNS	

== Participation ==
According to an unofficial count, 20 athletes from 11 countries participated in the event.

- Bulgaria (1)
- East Germany (1)
- Finland (3)
- France (2)
- Hungary (2)
- Italy (1)
- Norway (1)
- Soviet Union (3)
- Sweden (1)
- Great Britain (2)
- West Germany (3)
