= Aimo Aho =

Finnish javelin thrower (1951–2014)

Aimo Antero Aho (May 31, 1951 – July 10, 2014) was a Finnish javelin thrower. He made his first 80-meter throw at age 21, but spots on championship teams were hard to come by with Hannu Siitonen, Seppo Hovinen and Antero Puranen also competing. Aho represented Finland in the 1974 European Athletics Championships, the 1980 Olympics and extended his career to the 1983 World Championships in Athletics at home. Aho managed one national championship, in 1975 but medaled 8 other times. His career best – just short of 90 meters at 89.42 m – came in 1977.

After turning 35 in 1986 he set the Masters M35 world record at 77.64 m. His record lasted for more than 3 years before being surpassed by Rudolf Steiner who was more than 5 months his senior.
