= Masters M35 javelin throw world record progression =

Masters M35 javelin throw world record progression is the progression of world record improvements of the javelin throw M35 division of Masters athletics. Records must be set in properly conducted, official competitions under the standing IAAF rules unless modified by World Masters Athletics. The M35 division consists of male athletes who have reached the age of 35 but have not yet reached the age of 40, so exactly from their 35th birthday to the day before their 40th birthday. The M35 division throws an 800 g implement. These competitors threw their world record performances in Open competition. Železný's current world record was set while winning the 2001 World Championships in Athletics.

Key

Incomplete information Pending

Distance	Athlete	Nationality	Birthdate	Location	Date
92.80	Jan Železný	Czech Republic	16.06.1966	Edmonton	12.08.2001
90.76	Jan Železný	Czech Republic	16.06.1966	Edmonton	10.08.2001
89.94	Jan Železný	Czech Republic	16.06.1966	Lausanne	04.07.2001
89.35	Jan Železný	Czech Republic	16.06.1966	Lausanne	04.07.2001
89.31	Jan Železný	Czech Republic	16.06.1966	Lausanne	04.07.2001
88.70	Peter Blank	Germany	10.04.1962	Stuttgart	30.06.2001
86.99	Peter Blank	Germany	10.04.1962	Jena	24.05.1998
86.99	Peter Blank	Germany	10.04.1962	Bonn	17.05.1997
82.82	Tom Petranoff	South Africa	08.04.1958	Caserta	06.06.1993
82.62	Jorma Markus	Finland	28.11.1952	Pihtipudas	01.07.1990
79.94	Rudolf Steiner	Switzerland	16.01.1951	Sion	30.09.1989
77.64	Aimo Aho	Finland	31.05.1951	Pihtipudas	13.07.1986
76.48	Zakayo Malekwa	Tanzania	05.02.1951	Arlington	10.05.1986
