= Zdeněk Adamec =

Czech javelin thrower

Zdeněk Adamec (born 9 January 1956 in Mělník) is a Czech retired javelin thrower, who represented Czechoslovakia in the 1980s. He finished seventh at the inaugural 1983 World Championships in Helsinki, Finland and seventeenth in his qualifying round at the 1987 World Championships in Rome, Italy.

== Achievements ==
Year	Competition	Venue	Position	Event	Notes
Representing Czechoslovakia
1983	World Championships	Helsinki, Finland	7th	Javelin throw	81.30 m
1984	Friendship Games	Moscow, Soviet Union	3rd	Javelin throw	87.10 m
1987	World Championships	Rome, Italy	33rd (q)	Javelin throw	70.72 m^{1}

^{1}New model javelin
