= Wolfram Gambke =

German javelin thrower

Personal information
- Born: 2 November 1959 (age 66) Pinneberg, Schleswig-Holstein, West Germany

Sport
- Sport: Track and field
Medal record
Representing West Germany
Summer Universiade
Silver medal – second place	1985 Kobe	Javelin throw

Wolfram Gambke (born 2 November 1959) is a retired West German javelin thrower. He competed at the 1984 Summer Olympics.

== Achievements ==
Year	Competition	Venue	Position	Notes
Representing West Germany
1984	Olympic Games	Los Angeles, United States	4th	82.46 m
1985	Universiade	Kobe, Japan	2nd	84.46 m
1986	European Championships	Stuttgart, West Germany	6th	79.88 m

His personal bests are:
old javelin model: 85,90 m (1984)
new javelin model: 81,30 m (1986)

(Uwe Hohn having reached more than 100 metres (328 feet), a new javelin was introduced).
