= Esa Utriainen =

Finnish javelin thrower

Esa Markku Juhani Utriainen (born 20 November 1953) is a Finnish former javelin thrower. He was Finnish champion in 1979 and placed 12th in the 1983 World Championships in Athletics. He remains active in the sport as a coach.

== Biography ==
Utriainen was born in Virtasalmi (now part of Pieksämäki) on 20 November 1953. He was a finalist at the Finnish championships in 1977 and 1978 before winning in 1979; his winning throw, 90.94 m, remained his personal best. Track & Field News ranked him in the world's top 10 twice (in 1979 and 1981), with a peak ranking of No. 7 in the latter year. In 1983 he represented Finland at the inaugural World Championships in Helsinki; he qualified for the twelve-man final, but placed last in it.

After his athletic career he became a coach, originally in Finland; later, he coached the national javelin teams of South Korea and Britain. In 2015 he became the coach of Qatar's javelin team.

His daughter Sanni Utriainen, also coached by her father, won the World Junior Championship in 2010.
