= Athletics at the Friendship Games – Men's javelin throw =

The men's javelin throw event at the Friendship Games was held on 17 August 1984 at the Grand Arena of the Central Lenin Stadium in Moscow, Soviet Union. The old model of the javelin was used for this competition.

== Results ==
Rank	Name	Nationality	#1	#2	#3	#4	#5	#6	Result	Notes
1st place, gold medalist(s)	Uwe Hohn	East Germany	93.22	91.42	94.44	x	x	x	94.44	
2nd place, silver medalist(s)	Detlef Michel	East Germany	x	77.90	82.14	x	84.32	88.32	88.32	
3rd place, bronze medalist(s)	Zdeněk Adamec	Czechoslovakia	86.00	x	x	x	x	87.10	87.10	
4	Heino Puuste	Soviet Union							86.28	
5	Viktor Yevsyukov	Soviet Union							85.78	
6	Sergey Gavras	Soviet Union							85.08	
7	Gerald Weiß	East Germany							83.98	
8	András Temesi	Hungary							82.82	
9	Martín Álvarez	Cuba							76.14	
10	Jesús Vicente López	Argentina							69.76	
11	A. Mahmmud	South Yemen							45.86	

== See also ==
- Athletics at the 1984 Summer Olympics – Men's javelin throw
