= Detlef Michel =

German javelin thrower

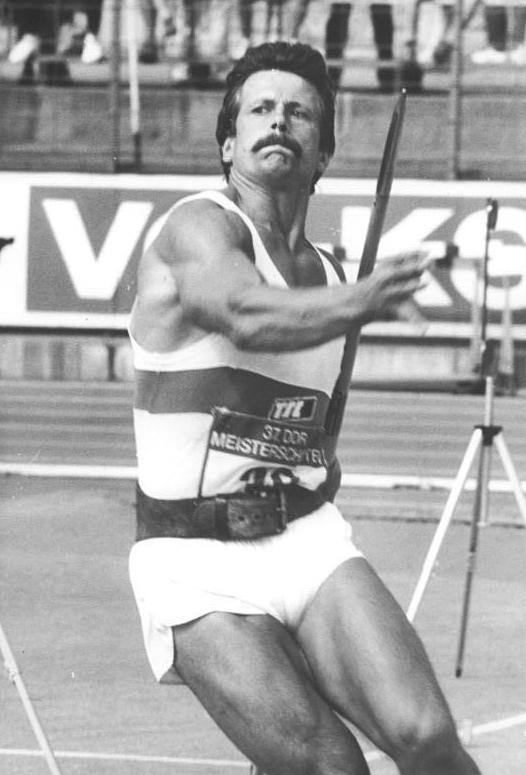
- Detlef Michel at the East German Championship in 1986

Personal information
- Nationality: East Germany
- Born: 13 October 1955 (age 70) Köpenick, East Germany
- Height: 190 cm (6 ft 3 in)
- Weight: 83 kg (183 lb)

Sport
- Country: East Germany
- Sport: Athletics
- Event: Javelin throw
- Club: Berliner TSC
- Coached by: Peter Börner

Achievements and titles
- World finals: 1983 Helsinki: Javelin throw; Gold
- Personal best: 96.72 m (1983)
Medal record
Men's athletics
Representing East Germany
World Championships
Gold medal – first place	1983 Helsinki	Javelin
European Championships
Silver medal – second place	1986 Stuttgart	Javelin
Bronze medal – third place	1982 Athens	Javelin

Detlef Michel (born 13 October 1955, in Berlin) is a German track and field athlete. He represented East Germany during the 1980s and was one of the world's best in the javelin throw. His most important result came when he won the World Championship title in Helsinki 1983 with a throw of 89.48 meters in adverse conditions (rain), beating world record holder Tom Petranoff (99.72m, 5 May 1983) of the USA by a comfortable margin. In fact, Michel threw the four longest throws of the final.

He competed in the Olympic Games twice, in 1980 and 1988, but went out in the qualifying round both times. He was unable to compete in 1984 due to his country's boycott of the games in Los Angeles and retired from professional sports in 1990.

Michel represented the Berlin sport club and trained with Peter Börner. During his career he was 1.84 meters tall and weighed 93 kilograms.

Michel's personal best under the old (pre-1986) javelin design specifications of 96.72 meters, thrown in Berlin on 8 June 1983, was for a while tied with Ferenc Paragi for second best in the world, behind only Petranoff's world record; it was later also exceeded by Uwe Hohn.

== Results at the European Athletics Championships ==
- 1978: 4th place (85.46)
- 1982: 3rd place (89.32)
- 1986: 2nd place (81.90)
