= Yngve Häckner =

Swedish javelin thrower and politician (1895–1987)

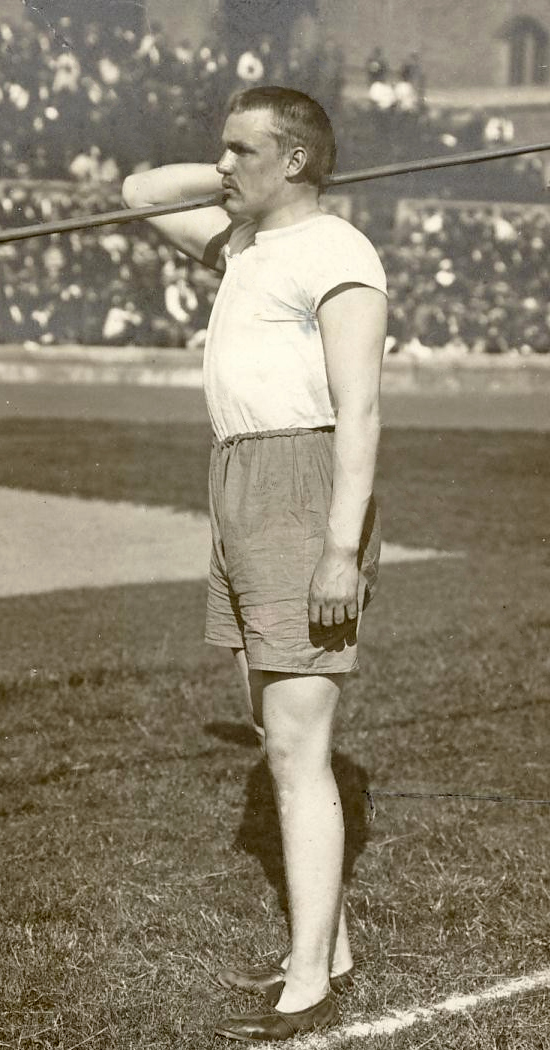
Yngve Häckner

Yngve Häckner (9 August 1895 – 3 December 1987) was a Swedish javelin thrower, lawyer and politician. He broke the world record total for javelin with both hands in 1917 and won the Swedish championship four times. From 1948 to 1952 he represented the Liberal People's Party in the second chamber of the Riksdag.

== Sports career ==
Häckner was Swedish champion in the javelin throw in 1913, 1914, 1917 and 1918. In all these years the two-handed format was used: the javelin was separately thrown with the right hand and the left hand, with the best results for both hands added together. In 1917 he broke Urho Peltonen's world record for this event, totalling 114.28 and throwing 61.81 with his better hand.

As throwing the javelin with both hands soon became a rarity, Häckner's world record has never been officially broken. Norway's Olav Sunde achieved a total of 117.21 in 1930, throwing 66.86 with his better hand, but that record wasn't officially ratified as the competition had been unsanctioned.

== Later life ==
Häckner was a lawyer by profession, and had his own law firm in Stockholm between 1937 and 1966. He also participated in politics, supporting the Liberal People's Party (Folkpartiet). He opposed Nazism and advocated boycotting the 1936 Summer Olympics in Berlin. He represented the Liberal People's Party in the second chamber of the Swedish Parliament (Riksdag) from 1948 to 1952. His paternal grandfather, Jonas Andersson, had also been a member of the Riksdag.
