= Dainis Kūla =

Latvian javelin thrower (born 1959)

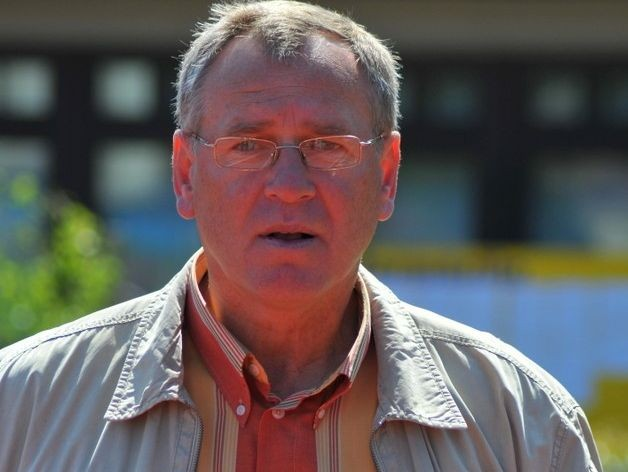

Personal information
- Nationality: Latvian
- Born: 28 April 1959 (age 67) Tukums, Latvian SSR, Soviet Union (now Republic of Latvia)
- Height: 1.98 m (6 ft 6 in)
- Weight: 90 kg (198 lb)

Sport
- Country: Soviet Union
- Sport: Athletics
- Event: Javelin throw

Achievements and titles
- Personal best: 92.06 m (1980)
Medal record
Men's Athletics
Representing the Soviet Union
Olympic Games
Gold medal – first place	1980 Moscow	Javelin
World Championships
Bronze medal – third place	1983 Helsinki	Javelin
Universiade
Gold medal – first place	1981 Bucharest	Javelin
Gold medal – first place	1983 Edmonton	Javelin

Dainis Kūla (born 28 April 1959 in Tukums, Latvian SSR) is a Latvian former javelin thrower who represented the Soviet Union at the international level for most of his career. He is most famous for controversially winning the gold medal in men's javelin throw at the 1980 Summer Olympics, becoming the second Latvian to achieve this (after Jānis Lūsis). He is also a World Championship bronze medalist, a three-time Soviet Champion and a two-time Universiade champion.

== 1980 Summer Olympics ==
Early in the training season for the 1980 Summer Olympics, Kūla threw 90.30 meters and in the run-up to the Olympics, he threw even farther: 92.06 meters, a mark he would never exceed in an official competition. The favorite though was Hungary's formidable Ferenc Paragi, who had thrown a new world record of 96.72 in April.

At the Olympics in Moscow, Kūla cleared the qualification stage easily but fouled on both of his first two throws in the final. As only the top eight of twelve finalists would be allowed the full six attempts, this meant everything hung on his third throw. Although the third throw flew far, it apparently landed flat and failed to pierce the field, which meant it too should have been ruled illegal. However, in front of the home crowd, the officials raised a white flag indicating that the throw was good; it was measured at 88.88, easily enough to advance him to the last three rounds (indeed taking the lead at that point). On his fourth throw, Kūla threw 91.20 meters, the only mark in the competition to exceed 90 m, giving him the Olympic gold. The silver went to Aleksandr Makarov with a last-round mark of 89.64, giving the Soviet Union both of the top spots, while Wolfgang Hanisch of East Germany took the bronze medal. The pre-competition favorite Paragi had led the qualification with 88.76, but only managed 79.52 during the first three rounds in the final and had to be content with 10th place, missing the last rounds.

With the old javelin design still in use at the time, throws frequently landed flat or ambiguously, resulting in questionable official judgements. Kūla's case has gained particular notoriety as it landed him with an Olympic gold, and also because it could easily be seen as Soviet officials favoring their own athlete. (There were other claims of this occurring in the javelin final, including an allegation that the stadium gates were opened to let helping wind in whenever Soviets were throwing, and that Kūla's important third throw had not only been misjudged but mismeasured as well.) However, none of these controversies resulted in any official protest.

== Further career ==
Kūla won his second major championship medal, a bronze, at the Helsinki World Championships in Athletics of 1983. His best throw in the rainy final was 85.58 meters, only two centimeters short of American Tom Petranoff's silver throw. This was the smallest margin possible at the time not relying on second-best throws as a tie-breaker, as javelin throws have only been officially measured with one centimeter accuracy since 1998. Petranoff, who had thrown a new world record of 99.72 earlier that year, and the eventual winner Detlef Michel of East Germany had been the pre-meet favorites.

In 1984, Kūla severely injured his hand and was less successful after the injury. In 1988 he was released from the Soviet team, however he continued to compete internationally up until the 1993 World Championships in Athletics in Stuttgart, by then representing his native Latvia. He failed to achieve any noticeable success there, as none of his throws crossed the 75 meter line.
