= Steve Roller =

American javelin thrower

Personal information
- Nationality: American
- Born: February 20, 1954 (age 72) Rochester, Minnesota, United States

Sport
- Sport: Athletics
- Event: Javelin throw

Steve Roller (born February 20, 1954) is an American athlete. He competed in the men's javelin throw at the 1984 Summer Olympics.
