= Detlef Fuhrmann =

German javelin thrower

Personal information
- Nationality: German
- Born: 22 July 1953 (age 72) Eisleben, East Germany

Sport
- Sport: Athletics
- Event: Javelin throw

Detlef Fuhrmann (born 22 July 1953) is a German former athlete. He competed in the men's javelin throw at the 1980 Summer Olympics.
