= Stefan Stoykov (javelin thrower) =

Bulgarian javelin thrower

Personal information
- Nationality: Bulgarian
- Born: 18 March 1951 (age 75) Tsar Asen
- Height: 184 cm (6 ft 0 in)
- Weight: 80 kg (176 lb)

Sport
- Country: Bulgaria
- Sport: Javelin throw

Stefan Stoykov (Bulgarian: Стефан Стойков) is a Bulgarian Olympic javelin thrower. He represented his country in the men's javelin throw at the 1980 Summer Olympics. He threw 78.74m in the qualifiers and a 79.04m in the finals.
