= Reidar Lorentzen =

Norwegian javelin thrower (born 1956)

Personal information
- Nationality: Norwegian
- Born: 22 September 1956 (age 69) Hammerfest

Sport
- Country: Norway
- Sport: Athletics
- Event: javelin throw

Reidar Lorentzen (born 22 September 1956) is a Norwegian javelin thrower. He was born in Hammerfest, and represented the club IK Tjalve. He competed at the 1984 Summer Olympics in Los Angeles.

== Personal life ==
Born in Hammerfest on 22 September 1956, Lorentzen is a son of politician and government minister Annemarie Røstvik Lorentzen. His brother Harald Lorentzen has won five national titles in athletics, in javelin throw, shot put and discus throw.

== Career ==
Lorentzen competed for the Oregon Ducks track and field team in the NCAA.

Representing the club IK Tjalve, Lorentzen won three national titles in javelin throw, in 1988, 1989 and 1991. His personal best is 80.06 meter, which was also the Norwegian record in javelin throw until 1996. He competed in javelin throw at the 1984 Summer Olympics in Los Angeles.

Representing the club Oslo IL, he won national titles in swimming in 100 meter backstroke in 1971, and in 100 meter butterfly in 1974.
