= Per Erling Olsen =

Norwegian javelin thrower

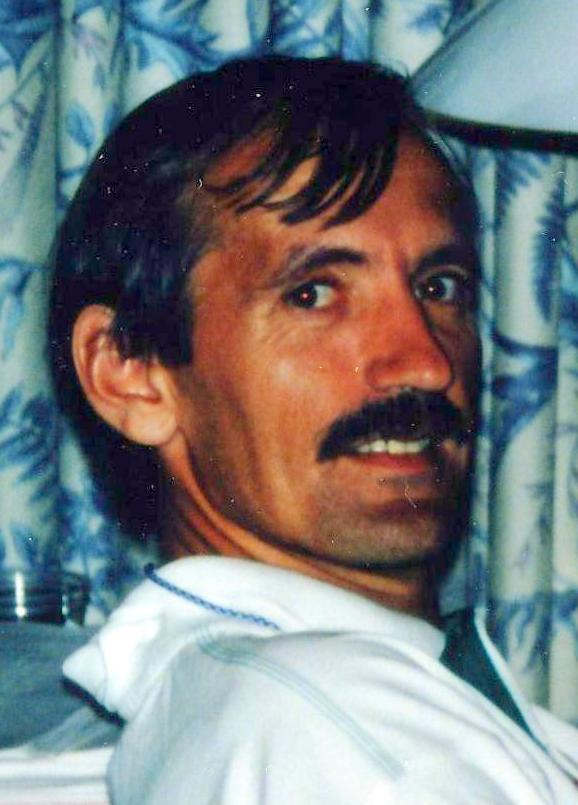
portrait of Per Erling Olsen

Per Erling Olsen (born 30 March 1958) is a former Norwegian javelin thrower. He represented SK Vidar. His personal best throw was 90.30 metres (old type), achieved in June 1983 on Bislett stadion.

At the 1984 Summer Olympics he finished ninth in the javelin final with a throw of 78.98 metres. He finished tenth at the 1982 European Championships in Athletics and fifth at the 1983 World Championships in Athletics. He became Norwegian champion from 1980-1984.

== Achievements ==
Year	Competition	Venue	Position	Notes
Representing Norway
1984	Olympic Games	Los Angeles, United States	9th	78.98 m
