= Wolfgang Hanisch =

East German javelin thrower

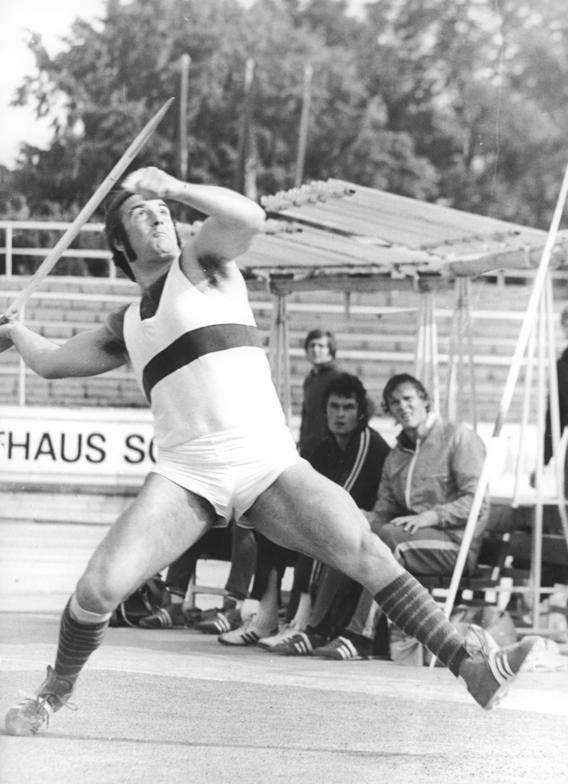
- Wolfgang Hanisch at the 1977 European Cup

Personal information
- Nationality: East Germany
- Born: 6 March 1951 (age 75) Großkorbetha, Saxony-Anhalt, East Germany
- Height: 1.87 m (6 ft 2 in)
- Weight: 92 kg (203 lb)

Sport
- Country: East Germany
- Sport: athletics
- Event: Javelin throw
- Club: SC Chemie Halle
- Coached by: Günter Siegel

Achievements and titles
- Personal best: 91.14 m (1978)
Medal record
Men's athletics
Representing East Germany
Olympic Games
Bronze medal – third place	1980 Moscow	Javelin throw
European Championships
Silver medal – second place	1974 Rome	Javelin throw
Bronze medal – third place	1971 Helsinki	Javelin throw
Bronze medal – third place	1978 Prague	Javelin throw

Wolfgang Hanisch (born 6 March 1951 in Großkorbetha, Sachsen-Anhalt) was an East German athlete who mainly competed in the javelin throw.

Hanisch had a long and successful international career competing for East Germany. He medalled in three consecutive editions of the European Athletics Championships, in Helsinki 1971, Rome 1974 and Prague 1978. His only Olympic appearance was the 1980 Summer Olympics held in Moscow, Soviet Union; there too, Hanisch was successful, winning the javelin bronze medal with a throw of 86.72 metres. However, gold in major meets eluded Hanisch. His most notable victory was in the 1979 IAAF World Cup in Montreal, Canada, when he brought the East German team the full points with a throw of 86.48.

Hanisch's personal best (with the old javelin design), thrown in Helsinki, Finland on 28 June 1978, was 91.14 metres, an East German record at the time.
