= Antero Puranen =

Finnish javelin thrower (born 1952)

Personal information
- Born: 8 November 1952 (age 73) Tervo, Finland
- Height: 185 cm (6 ft 1 in)
- Weight: 90–92 kg (198–203 lb)

Sport
- Country: Finland
- Sport: Javelin throw

Heikki Antero Puranen (born 8 August 1952) is a Finnish Olympic javelin thrower. He represented his country in the men's javelin throw at the 1980 Summer Olympics. His distance was an 84.02 in the qualifiers and an 85.12 in the finals.
