= Raimo Manninen (athlete) =

Finnish javelin thrower

Personal information
- Born: 17 September 1955 (age 70) Lahti, Finland

Sport
- Sport: Track and field

Raimo Matias Manninen (born 17 September 1955) is a retired male javelin thrower from Finland. He competed at the 1984 Summer Olympics in Los Angeles, California, finishing in 13th place. He set his personal best (93.42 metres) with the old javelin in 1984.

== Achievements ==
Year	Competition	Venue	Position	Notes
Representing Finland
1984	Olympic Games	Los Angeles, United States	13th	79.26 m
