= Klaus Tafelmeier =

German javelin thrower (born 1958)

Personal information
- Full name: Klaus-Dieter Tafelmeier
- Nationality: West Germany
- Born: April 12, 1958 (age 68) Singen, Baden-Württemberg, West Germany
- Height: 1.90 m (6 ft 3 in)
- Weight: 95 kg (209 lb)

Sport
- Country: West Germany
- Sport: Athletics
- Event: Javelin throw
- Club: Bayer Leverkusen

Achievements and titles
- Personal bests: Old javelin: 91.44 m (1983); New javelin: 86.64 m (1987)
Medal record
Men's athletics
Representing West Germany
European Championships
Gold medal – first place	1986 Stuttgart	Javelin throw

Klaus-Dieter Tafelmeier (born 12 April 1958 in Singen, Baden-Württemberg) is a retired German javelin thrower. He represented Bayer 04 Leverkusen.

In September 1986, Tafelmeier threw 85.74 metres in Como to record the first official world record for the new javelin type. The record lasted until May 1987 when Jan Železný threw 87.66 metres. Tafelmeier later established a career best throw of 86.64 metres in Gelsenkirchen. This ranks him seventh among German javelin throwers with the new implement, behind Johannes Vetter, Thomas Röhler, Raymond Hecht, Boris Henry, Peter Blank and Peter Esenwein.

== Achievements ==
Year	Competition	Venue	Position	Notes
Representing West Germany
1977	European Junior Championships	Donetsk, Soviet Union	1st	84.14 m
1982	European Championships	Athens, Greece	13th	70.40 m
1983	World Championships	Helsinki, Finland	8th	80.42 m
1984	Olympic Games	Los Angeles, United States	22nd	73.52 m
1986	European Championships	Stuttgart, West Germany	1st	84.76 m
1987	World Championships	Rome, Italy	15th	76.46 m
1988	Olympic Games	Seoul, South Korea	4th	82.72 m
1990	European Championships	Split, Yugoslavia	11th	77.26 m
1991	World Championships	Tokyo, Japan	33rd	72.42 m

== Seasonal bests by year ==
- 1986 - 85.74
- 1987 - 86.64
- 1988 - 82.72
