= Kenth Eldebrink =

Swedish javelin thrower

Personal information
- National team: Sweden
- Citizenship: Sweden
- Born: 14 May 1955 (age 70) Morjärv, Sweden

Sport
- Country: Sweden
- Sport: track and field athletics
- Club: Södertälje IF

Kenth Eldebrink (born 14 May 1955 in Morjärv) is a retired Swedish athlete who mainly competed in the men's javelin throw event.

He competed for Sweden at the 1984 Summer Olympics held in Los Angeles, California, where he won the bronze medal in the men's javelin throw event. He retired in 1986.

He is the older brother of the former ice hockey player Anders Eldebrink. His twin daughters, Frida and Elin, are professional basketball players.

== Achievements ==
Year	Competition	Venue	Position	Notes
Representing Sweden
1982	European Championships	Athens, Greece	11th	76.76 m
1983	World Championships	Helsinki, Finland	6th	83.28 m
1984	Olympic Games	Los Angeles, California, United States	3rd	83.72 m
