= Ferenc Paragi =

Hungarian javelin thrower

Personal information
- Born: 21 August 1953 Budapest, Hungary
- Died: 21 April 2016 (aged 62)
- Height: 179 cm (5 ft 10 in)
- Weight: 104 kg (229 lb)

Sport
- Country: Hungary
- Sport: Track and field
- Event: Javelin throw

Achievements and titles
- Olympic finals: 1976 Summer Olympics (20th); 1980 Summer Olympics (10th)
- National finals: Hungarian Athletics Championships (Winner: 1975–77, 1979, 1982)
- Personal best: 96.72m (1980, WR)

Ferenc Paragi (21 August 1953 – 21 April 2016) was a Hungarian athlete who, on 23 April 1980 established a world record of 96.72 meters in the javelin throw, eclipsing the global standard set by fellow countryman Miklós Németh at the 1976 Summer Olympics in Montreal.

This effort added more than two meters to the previous world record, fueling discussion and speculation regarding the likelihood of alterations to the javelin's design and flight characteristics. Proposed changes would finally take effect in 1986, following another two sizable improvements to the javelin world record; the first coming in 1983, when Tom Petranoff, then of the United States, added precisely three meters to Paragi's mark, and the other in 1984, when East German Uwe Hohn launched the 800 gram implement to 104.80 meters.

Hohn's mark only came after the new design had already been officially proposed, and contrary to a popular myth had nothing to do with the change. Indeed, the primary reason for the change was to get rid of the then frequent flat or ambiguous landings, which often made it hard to assess if a throw should be declared legal, most famously in the high-profile case at the 1980 Summer Olympics in Moscow where the eventual winner Dainis Kūla only progressed to the last three rounds with an apparently flat throw. Ambiguous landings were also much more difficult to measure accurately, compared to clearly legal ones where the javelin would stick in the ground at the landing spot.

Paragi also competed at the Moscow Olympics. Even though his form had dipped a bit after another monster mark of 96.20 on 18 May 1980, there could be no question he was among the leading favorites. However, he had problems in the qualifying round, languishing more than five meters from a spot in the finals after two rounds with a sub-standard mark of 72.60, but saved himself by throwing 88.76 with his third and final attempt – the best mark in the whole qualifying competition by almost three meters. Next day in the final however, he could do no better than 79.52 and finished in tenth place. His qualification performance would have been enough for a bronze.

Paragi was the Hungarian champion for 5 years.
