= Bob Roggy =

American javelin thrower

Bob Roggy (August 6, 1956 in Holmdel Township, New Jersey, United States – August 4, 1986) was a javelin thrower from the United States. He set the world best year performance in 1982, throwing 95.80 metres in Stuttgart, West Germany on August 29. Earlier in 1982, Roggy set the American record in the Javelin at the Bruce Jenner Invitational, beating Mark Murro's 12-year-old record. Previously, while a senior at Southern Illinois University he won the NCAA Men's Outdoor Track and Field Championships in 1978.

Roggy was killed in an accident where he fell out of the back of a pick-up truck in 1986 in Houston, Texas, at the first Olympic Sports Festival.

Roggy attended Holmdel High School. Following his death, a scholarship was set up in memory. Every year the two best athletes at Holmdel High get the opportunity to follow in his footsteps with an athletic scholarship.

== See also ==
- Caitlyn Jenner (formerly Bruce Jenner)
- RoggyBog69 (Internet Comedian)
