= Uwe Hohn =

German track and field athlete (born 1962)

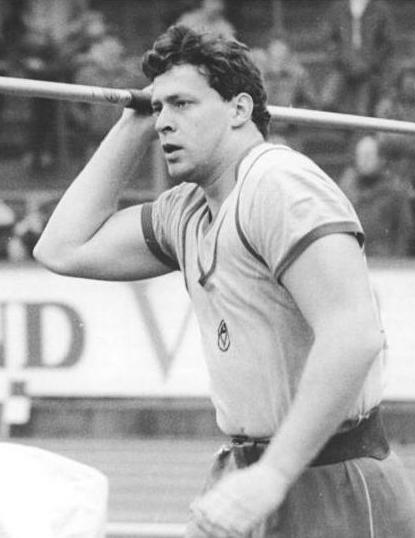
- Hohn in 1984

Personal information
- Nationality: German
- Born: 16 July 1962 (age 63) Neuruppin, East Germany
- Height: 1.98 m (6 ft 6 in)
- Weight: 118 kg (260 lb)

Sport
- Country: East Germany
- Sport: Track and field
- Event: Javelin throw
- Club: ASK Vorwärts Potsdam

Achievements and titles
- Personal bests: WR 104.80 m (1984)
Medal record
Representing East Germany
Men's athletics
World Cup
Gold medal – first place	1985 Canberra	Javelin
European Championships
Gold medal – first place	1982 Athens	Javelin

Uwe Hohn (born 16 July 1962) is a retired German track and field athlete who competed in the javelin throw. He is the only athlete to throw a javelin 100 metres or more, with his world record of 104.80 m (343 ft 9 3/4 in). A new javelin design was implemented in 1986 and the records had to be restarted, thus Hohn's mark became an "eternal world record". After his retirement from competition, Hohn became a coach and since 1999 he has worked for SC Potsdam, the successor of ASK Vorwärts Potsdam, where he started his career as a sportsman. He has also coached Indian track and field athlete Neeraj Chopra, who won the gold in the men's javelin throw at the 2020 Summer Olympics held in Tokyo.

== Career ==
Born in Neuruppin, Hohn excelled at the javelin throw from a young age and won the 1981 European Junior Championship with a throw of 86.56 m, a junior record. He then won gold at the 1982 European Championships with a 91.34 m throw. He did not compete at the 1983 World Championships and missed the 1984 Summer Olympics as East Germany had boycotted the games. He did however win gold at the Friendship Games, throwing 94.44 m (Arto Härkönen won the 1984 Olympics with a throw of 86.76 m). In 1985, Hohn won the IAAF World Cup and European Cup but his career ended in 1986 after several setbacks due to a surgery.

=== World record ===
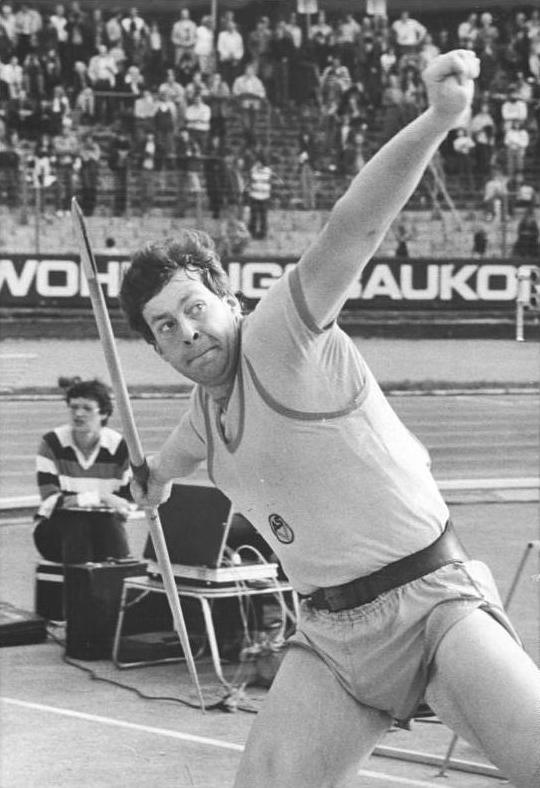
Hohn in 1984

On 20 July 1984, competing in the Olympic Day of Athletics competition at the Friedrich-Ludwig-Jahn-Sportpark, Berlin, Hohn threw the javelin a distance of 104.80 m (343 ft 9 3/4 in). Hohn's throw shattered the previous world record of 99.72 m set by Tom Petranoff of the United States in May 1983. Contrary to popular myth, this was not the primary reason for the change in javelin design rules that came into force starting in 1986; the relevant change of moving the javelin's centre of gravity forward by four centimetres had already been officially proposed prior to Hohn's record throw, not only to shorten distances but also to get rid of the then frequent flat or ambiguous landings, which often made it hard to assess if a throw should be declared legal. However, Hohn's record-breaking throw accelerated the process as throws of his distance were in danger of going beyond the available space in normal stadiums.

=== Coaching ===
Hohn has been a professional coach since 1999. In 2017, Hohn signed a contract with the Athletics Federation of India (AFI) to coach the Indian javelin squad including Junior world record holder Neeraj Chopra through the 2020 Tokyo Olympics. At the Games, Chopra won the gold medal for India with a throw of 87.58 m. AFI sacked Hohn after the Games, citing dissatisfaction with his training methods and financial demands they deemed unreasonable.

== Personal life ==
Hohn has been married since 1983 and has two children. He is 1.98 metres (6 ft 6 in) tall and had a competition weight of 112 kg.

== Achievements ==
- 1976 to 1980: GDR champion for his age group
- 1981: European junior champion for the GDR starting in Utrecht with 86.58 m; European junior record with 86.58 m
- 1982: European Champion in Athens with 91.34 m
- 1984: GDR sportsman of the year. Threw the longest men's javelin throw ever at 104.80 m.
- 1985: Won the javelin event at the 1985 IAAF World Cup – Canberra with 96.96 m (best performance in the world that year)
- 1985: Set a championship record of 92.88 m at the 1985 European Cup

Awards
Preceded by Uwe Raab	East German Sportsman of the Year; 1984	Succeeded by Jens Weißflog
