= Agostino Ghesini =

Italian javelin thrower (born 1958)

Personal information
- Nationality: Italian
- Born: 4 August 1958 (age 67) Ravenna, Italy

Sport
- Country: Italy
- Sport: Athletics
- Event: Javelin throw
Medal record
Representing Italy
Mediterranean Games
Gold medal – first place	1983 Casablanca	Javelin throw

Agostino Ghesini (born 4 August 1958) is a retired male javelin thrower from Italy.

== Biography ==
He finished 23rd place at the 1984 Summer Olympics in Los Angeles, California. He set his personal best (89.12 m) in 1983.

== Achievements ==
Year	Competition	Venue	Position	Notes
1982	European Championships	Athens, Greece	8th	81.10 m
1983	Mediterranean Games	Casablanca, Morocco	1st	79.28 m
1984	Olympic Games	Los Angeles, California, United States	23rd	72.96 m
