= Dariusz Adamus =

Polish javelin thrower

Personal information
- Nationality: Polish
- Born: 13 January 1957 (age 68) Kłodzko, Poland
- Height: 1.85 m (6 ft 1 in)
- Weight: 94 kg (207 lb)

Sport
- Sport: Athletics
- Event: Javelin throw

Dariusz Adamus (born 13 January 1957) is a Polish javelin thrower. He competed in the 1980 Summer Olympics.
