= David Ottley =

British javelin thrower (born 1955)

Dave Ottley
Personal information
- Nationality: British (English)
- Born: 5 August 1955 (age 71) West Thurrock, Essex, England
- Height: 186 cm (6 ft 1 in)
- Weight: 95 kg (209 lb)

Sport
- Sport: Athletics
- Event: Javelin
- Club: Telford/Thurrock Harriers
Medal record
Men's Athletics
Representing Great Britain
Olympic Games
Silver medal – second place	1984 Los Angeles	Javelin throw
Summer Universiade
Silver medal – second place	1977 Sofia	Javelin throw
Representing England
Commonwealth Games
Gold medal – first place	1986 Edinburgh	Javelin throw

David Charles Ottley (born 5 August 1955) is a retired British athlete who mainly competed in the men's javelin throw event. He competed at three Olympic Games.

== Biography ==
Ottley finished second behind Peter Maync in the Javelin event at the 1976 AAA Championships but by virtue of being the highest placed British athlete was considered the British javelin throw champion. The following year he won the title outright at the 1977 AAA Championships.

Ottley represented England, at the 1978 Commonwealth Games in Edmonton, Canada before going to his first Olympic Games in 1980. At the 1980 Olympics Games in Moscow, he represented Great Britain in the javelin throw event.

After two second place finishes in the AAAs, and then two third place finishes (the latter as the highest placed British athlete) he won the 1982 AAA Championships to continue his domination as Britain's leading javelin thrower. A second Commonwealth Games appearance for England ensued at the 1982 Commonwealth Games in Brisbane, Australia.

His finest moment came when he won a silver medal in the Javelin event at 1984 Olympic Games in Los Angeles. He won three consecutive AAAA titles from 1984 to 1986 and represented England for a third time at the Commonwealth Games, winning a gold medal at the 1986 Commonwealth Games in Edinburgh, Scotland.

Ottley won his sixth and last AAA title at the 1988 AAA Championships, the same year that he went to a third Olympic Games in Seoul. Altogether he won six AAA titles and was British champion ten times and he paved the way for the likes of Mick Hill and Steve Backley. Additionally he won five UK Athletics Championships from 1978 to 1982.

== Personal life ==
Ottley is referenced In "The Boy Who Cried Rat" episode of Good Morning, Miss Bliss, in which Mr. Belding (Dennis Haskins) proclaims that nobody remembers second place, referencing the javelin throw of 1984 Summer Olympics. Miss Bliss however correctly identifies that the silver medallist was indeed Ottley.

Ottley now resides in Shropshire, having moved home from Essex to Telford, and has two children.

== International competitions ==
Year	Competition	Venue	Position	Notes
Representing Great Britain and England
1984	Olympic Games	Los Angeles, United States	2nd	85.74 m
1986	Commonwealth Games	Edinburgh, United Kingdom	1st	80.62 m
1987	World Championships	Rome, Italy	9th	77.64 m
