= Aleksandr Makarov (javelin thrower) =

Soviet athlete

Personal information
- Native name: Aneкcaндp Фёдорович Maкaрoв
- Full name: Aleksandr Fyodorovich Makarov
- Born: 11 February 1951 (age 75) Kasimov, Ryazan, Russia
- Height: 1.84 m (6 ft 0 in)
- Weight: 98 kg (216 lb)

Sport
- Sport: Athletics
- Event: Javelin throw
- Club: Dynamo Moscow

Achievements and titles
- Personal best: 89.64 m (1980)
Medal record
Men's Athletics
Representing the Soviet Union
Olympic Games
Silver medal – second place	1980 Moscow	Javelin throw

Aleksandr Fyodorovich Makarov (Russian: Апександр Фёдорович Макаров; born 11 February 1951 in Kasimov, Ryazan) is a Soviet athlete who mainly competed in the javelin throw.

He competed for the Soviet Union at the 1980 Summer Olympics held in Moscow, Soviet Union, where he won the silver medal in the men's javelin throw, with a distance of 89.64 metres. He is the father of former javelin thrower Sergey Makarov.
