= Pentti Sinersaari =

Finnish javelin thrower

Pentti Olavi Sinersaari (born October 5, 1956 in Elimäki) is a former track and field athlete from Finland who competed in the men's javelin throw event. He finished sixth at the 1980 Summer Olympics, and won Finnish Championship twice, in year 1980 and 1983. He set the world's best year performance in 1979, throwing 93.84 metres at a meet in Auckland, New Zealand on 1979-01-27.
