= Hannu Siitonen =

Finnish javelin thrower

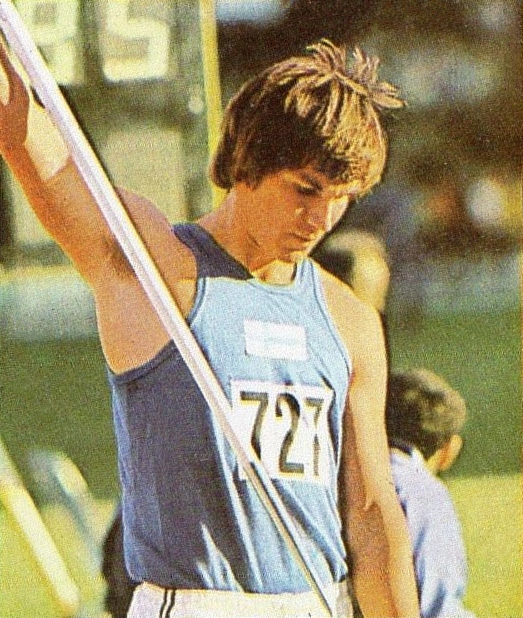

Personal information
- Full name: Hannu Juhani Siitonen
- Nationality: Finnish
- Born: 18 March 1949 (age 77) Parikkala, Finland
- Height: 1.83 m (6 ft 0 in)
- Weight: 86–88 kg (190–194 lb)

Sport
- Country: Finland
- Sport: Athletics
- Event: Javelin throw
- Club: Saaren Urheilijat

Achievements and titles
- Personal best: 93.90 m (1973)
Medal record
Men's athletics
Representing Finland
Olympic Games
Silver medal – second place	1976 Montreal	Javelin throw
European Championships
Gold medal – first place	1974 Rome	Javelin throw

Hannu Juhani Siitonen (born 18 March 1949) is a retired Finnish javelin thrower. He competed at the 1972 and 1976 Olympics and placed fourth and second, respectively. He won the European javelin title in 1974 and finished fourth in 1971.
