= Tom Petranoff =

American javelin thrower

Personal information
- Full name: Thomas Alan Petranoff
- Born: April 8, 1958 (age 68) Aurora, Illinois, U.S.
- Height: 1.88 m (6 ft 2 in)
- Weight: 109 kg (240 lb)

Achievements and titles
- Personal bests: 99.72 m (old implement); NR 89.16 m (1991)
Medal record
Men's Athletics
Representing United States
World Championships
Silver medal – second place	1983 Helsinki	Javelin
Olympic Boycott Games
Silver medal – second place	1980 Philadelphia	Javelin
Representing South Africa
African Championships in Athletics
Gold medal – first place	1992 Mauritius	Javelin
Gold medal – first place	1993 Durban	Javelin

Thomas Alan Petranoff (born April 8, 1958) is a retired American track and field athlete who competed in the javelin throw. He held the world record (old implement javelin) from May 1983 to July 1984; his 99.72 m (327 ft) throw was almost the length of an American football field (360 feet (110 meters). During his career, he was a silver medalist at the World Championships in 1983 and represented the United States at the Summer Olympics in 1984 and 1988. He transferred to South Africa in the 1990s and was twice a winner at the African Championships. His personal best with the new implement javelin is 89.16 m (292.5 ft). In the final years of his career, he returned to the United States and won a medal at the 1999 Pan American Games.

== Career ==
Petranoff's world record added precisely three meters to the previous global standard of 96.72 m, set in 1980 by Hungary's Ferenc Paragi. Petranoff's effort fueled further discussion and speculation regarding the likelihood of alterations to the javelin's design and flight characteristics. Propelled by the need to shorten distances and the then frequent flat or ambiguous landings (which resulted in many controversial official judgements), a change to a new design finally took effect in April 1986. By then, East German Uwe Hohn had greatly improved Petranoff's mark with a throw of 104.80 meters. This throw came after the changes had been officially proposed and (unlike Petranoff's record) was not a driving cause of the change.

Petranoff's mark with the old javelin design was never exceeded by any throw other than Hohn's mark. He also did well with the new design; his personal best of 89.16, thrown at Potchefstroom, South Africa on March 1, 1991, was at the time the second best ever (excluding marks thrown with a soon-to-be-banned "rough-tailed javelin" that had been introduced by Miklós Németh), behind only Steve Backley's world record of 89.58 m.

In 1984, Petranoff won the Superstars championship with a record score of 61 points. He qualified for the United States Olympic Team, but finished a disappointing 10th in the final in Los Angeles.

A native of Illinois, Petranoff later became a citizen of South Africa and competed for that country in various international competitions.

== Personal life ==
Petranoff is also the inventor of the "Turbo Javelin." This implement is used for javelin practice, especially of the indoor kind. Made of heavy-duty plastic and a rubber tip, the turbo javelin is very safe and ideal for indoor practice, and makes a good substitute for younger throwers as the official javelin can be dangerous. It is now used in its own competitions for people of all ages and is great for recreation departments and much more. The world record holder with the turbo javelin is Breaux Greer of the U.S.A.

== International competitions ==
Year	Competition	Venue	Position	Notes
Representing the (United States)
1984	Olympic Games	Los Angeles, United States	10th	78.40 m
1986	Goodwill Games	Moscow, Soviet Union	1st	83.46 m
1987	World Championships	Rome, Italy	4th	81.28 m
1988	Olympic Games	Seoul, South Korea	18th (q)	77.48 m
Representing South Africa
1992	African Championships	Mauritius	1st	87.26 m
1993	World Championships	Stuttgart, Germany	22nd (q)	75.26 m
1993	African Championships	Durban, South Africa	1st	82.40 m
Representing the (United States)
1999	Pan American Games	Winnipeg, Canada	3rd	75.95 m
