= Miklós Németh (javelin thrower) =

Hungarian javelin thrower

Personal information
- Nationality: Hungarian
- Born: 23 October 1946 (age 79) Budapest, Hungary
- Height: 193 cm (6 ft 4 in)
- Weight: 95 kg (209 lb)

Sport
- Sport: Athletics
- Event: Javelin throw
- Club: TFSE, Budapest / Vasas
Medal record
Men's athletics
Representing Hungary
Olympic Games
Gold medal – first place	1976 Montreal	Javelin
Universiade
Gold medal – first place	1970 Turin	Javelin

Miklós Németh (born 23 October 1946) is a Hungarian Olympic champion and former world record holder in the javelin throw.

== Biography ==
Born in Budapest, he is the son of Imre Németh, who won the Olympic gold in the hammer throw at the 1948 Summer Olympics. Németh's winning effort at the 1976 Summer Olympics in Montreal was also a world record, 94.58m in the first round. Silver medalist Hannu Siitonen of Finland, whose record of 93.90m was set in June, achieved 87.92m — more than 6.5m (nearly 22 feet) behind Németh. The new champion was elected Hungarian Sportsman of the Year for his achievement.

Németh's gold medal world-record performance stood until 23 April 1980, when fellow Hungarian Ferenc Paragi launched the spear 96.72m.

He won the British AAA Championships title in the javelin event at the 1980 AAA Championships.

Awards
Preceded by (Hungary) András Hargitay	Hungarian Sportsman of The Year; 1976	Succeeded by (Hungary) Pál Gerevich
