= Heino Puuste =

Estonian javelin thrower

Personal information
- Nationality: Estonian
- Born: 7 September 1955 (age 70) Lagedi, Estonia
- Height: 1.88 m (6 ft 2 in)
- Weight: 88 kg (194 lb)

Sport
- Country: Soviet Union
- Sport: Athletics
- Event: Javelin throw

Achievements and titles
- Personal best: 94.20 m (1983)
Medal record
Men's athletics
Representing Soviet Union
European Championships
Silver medal – second place	1982 Athens	Javelin throw
Universiade
Bronze medal – third place	1979 Mexico City	Javelin throw
Bronze medal – third place	1981 Bucharest	Javelin throw

Heino Puuste (born 7 September 1955 in Lagedi) is a retired Estonian javelin thrower who represented the USSR and later Estonia. He finished fourth at both the 1980 Summer Olympics and the 1983 World Championships, and won a silver medal at the 1982 European Championships. He also won bronze medals at the Universiade in 1979 and 1981. On 6 May 1983 he threw at Birmingham a new Soviet record of 94.20 meters, eclipsing the old mark (and former world record) of 93.80 by Jānis Lūsis. This record was never beaten as increasing distances and frequent flat or ambiguous landings prompted a change to a new javelin design, effective starting in 1986. Puuste later became an athletics coach, most notably coaching the 2005 javelin throw world champion Andrus Värnik.

== Personal life ==
Heino Puuste's father-in-law was basketball player Ilmar Kullam.

Awards
Preceded by Jüri Poljans	Estonian Sportsman of the Year; 1982 – 1983	Succeeded by Tiit Haagma
Preceded by Riho Suun	Estonian Sportsman of the Year; 1986	Succeeded by Jaan Ehlvest
