= Arto Härkönen =

Finnish javelin thrower (born 1959)

Personal information
- Full name: Arto Kalevi Härkönen
- Nationality: Finnish
- Born: 31 January 1959 (age 67) Helsinki, Finland
- Height: 1.90 m (6 ft 3 in)
- Weight: 88 kg (194 lb)

Sport
- Country: Finland
- Sport: Athletics
- Event: Javelin throw

Achievements and titles
- Personal best: 92.40 m (1984)
Medal record
Men's Athletics
Representing Finland
Olympic Games
Gold medal – first place	1984 Los Angeles	Javelin throw
Universiade
Silver medal – second place	1979 Mexico City	Javelin throw

Arto Kalevi Härkönen (born 31 January 1959, in Helsinki) is a retired Finnish javelin thrower who won the gold medal at the 1984 Summer Olympics, with a throw of 86.76 metres.

== International competitions ==
Year	Competition	Venue	Position	Notes
Representing Finland
1984	Olympic Games	Los Angeles, United States	1st	86.76 m
