= Javelin throw =

Track and field athletics event

Athletics Javelin throw
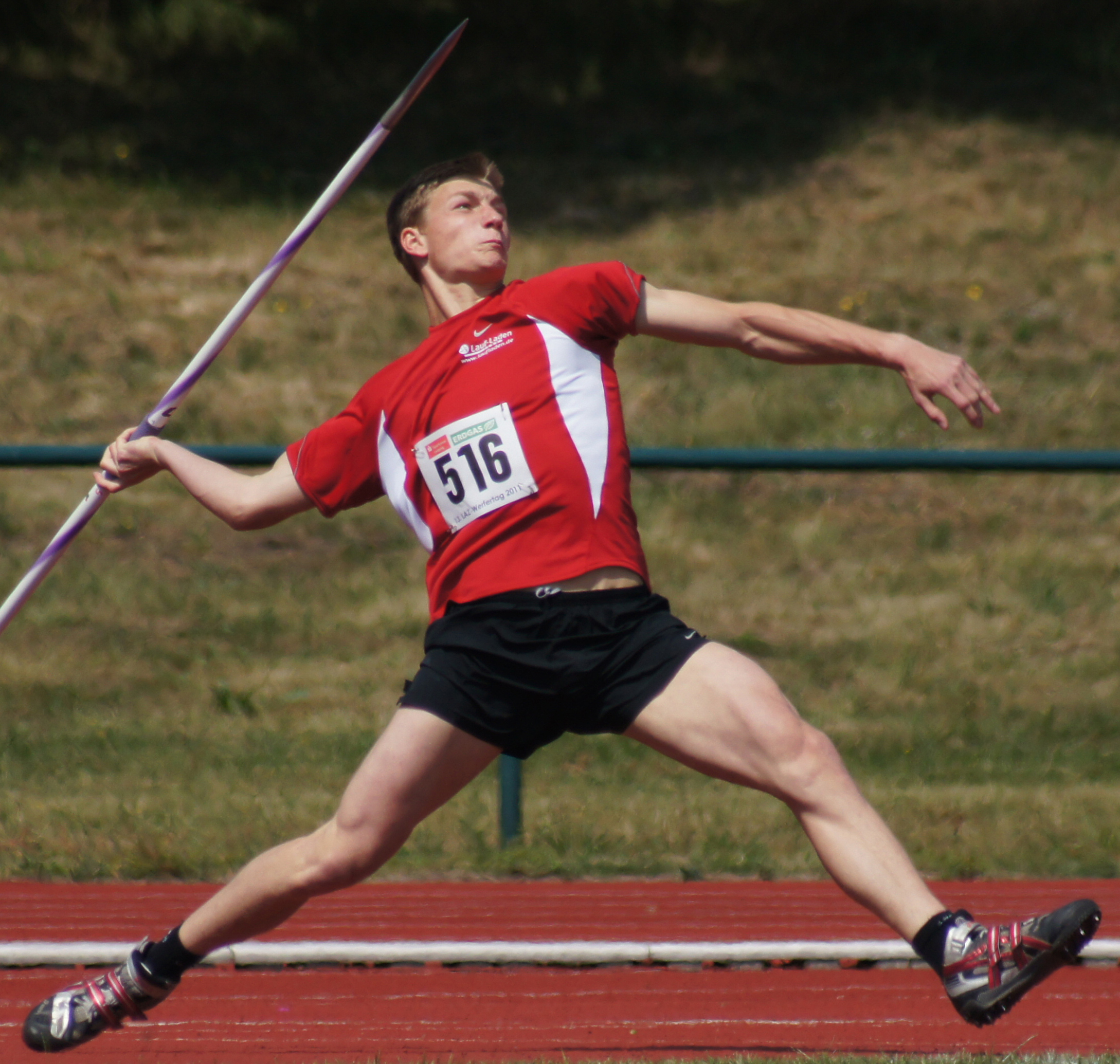
- German javelin thrower Thomas Röhler in 2011

World records
- Men: (Czech Republic) Jan Železný 98.48 m (323 ft 1 in) (1996)
- Women: (Czech Republic) Barbora Špotáková 72.28 m (237 ft 1 in) (2008)

Olympic records
- Men: (Pakistan) Arshad Nadeem 92.97 m (305 ft 0 in) (2024)
- Women: (Cuba) Osleidys Menéndez 71.53 m (234 ft 8 in) (2004)

World Championship records
- Men: (Czech Republic) Jan Železný 92.80 m (304 ft 5 in) (2001)
- Women: (Cuba) Osleidys Menéndez 71.70 m (235 ft 2 in) (2005)

World junior (U20) records
- Men: (India) Neeraj Chopra 86.48 m (283 ft 8 in) (2016)
- Women: (China) Yan Ziyi 71.74 m (235 ft 4 in) (2026)

The javelin throw is a track and field event where the javelin, a spear about 2.5 m (8 ft 2 in) in length, is thrown as far as possible. The javelin thrower gains momentum by running within a predetermined area. Javelin throwing is an event of both the men's decathlon and the women's heptathlon.

== History ==
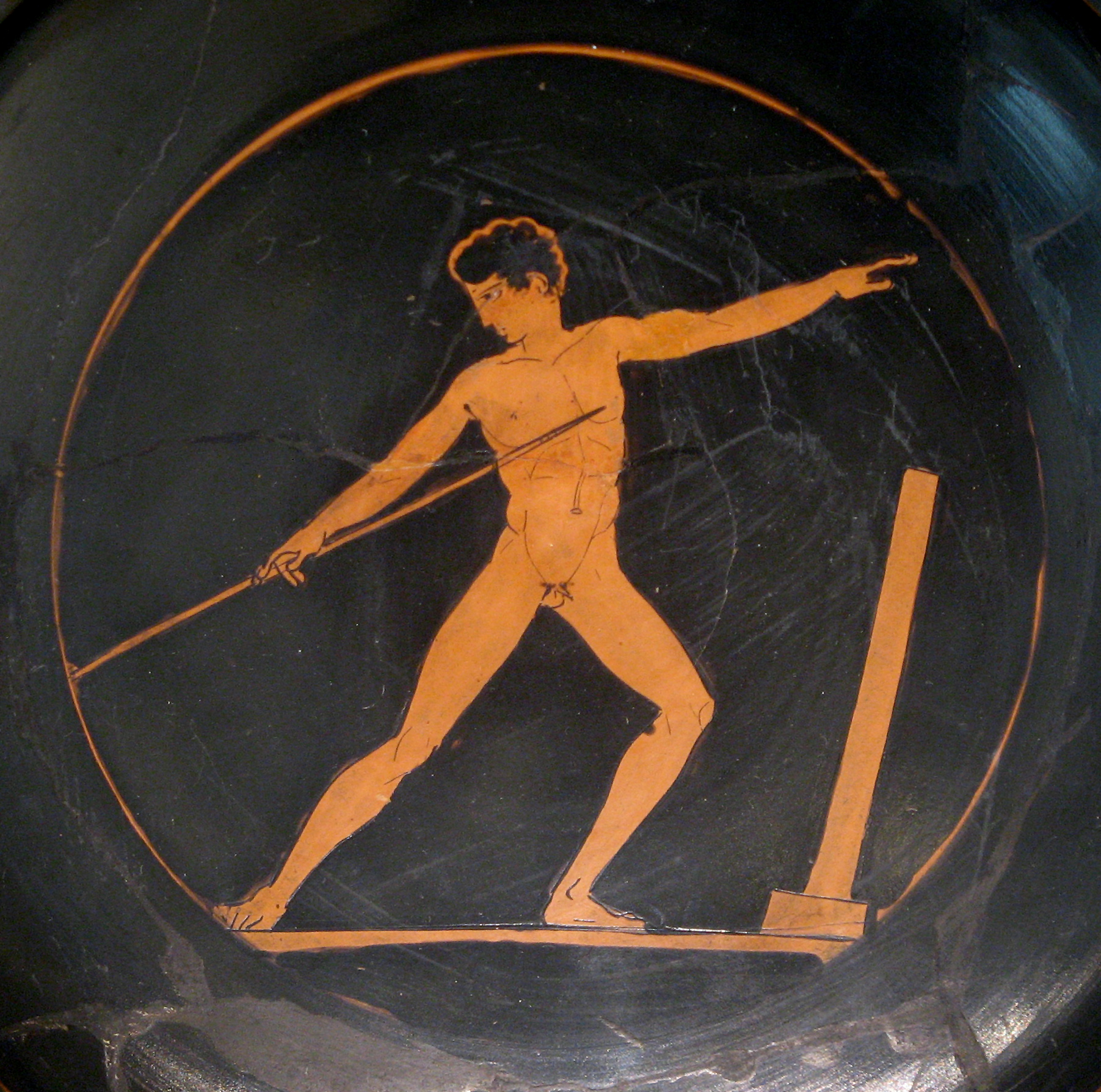
Javelin thrower on an Athenian red-figure cup, 5th century BCE (Berlin Antikensammlung F 2728)

The javelin throw was added to the Ancient Olympic Games as part of the pentathlon in 708 BC. It included two events, one for distance and the other for accuracy in hitting a target. The javelin was thrown with the aid of an Amentum (ankyle in Greek), a leather strap, that was wound around the middle of the shaft. Athletes held the javelin by the amentum and, as they released the javelin, the unwinding of the strap gave the javelin axial spin, stabilizing its flight.

Throwing javelin-like poles into targets was revived in Germany and Sweden in the early 1870s. In Sweden, these poles developed into the modern javelin, and throwing them for distance became a common event there and in Finland in the 1880s. The rules continued to evolve over the next decades; originally, javelins were thrown with no run-up, and holding them by the grip at the center of gravity was not always mandatory. Limited run-ups were introduced in the late 1890s, and soon developed into the modern unlimited run-up.

Sweden's Eric Lemming, who threw his first world best (49.32 metres) in 1899 and ruled the event from 1902 to 1912, was the first dominant javelin thrower. When the men's javelin was introduced as an Olympic discipline at the 1906 Intercalated Games, Lemming won by almost nine metres and broke his own world record; Sweden swept the first four places, as Finland's best throwers were absent and the event had yet to become popular in any other country. Though challenged by younger talents, Lemming repeated as Olympic champion in 1908 and 1912; his eventual best mark (62.32 m, thrown after the 1912 Olympics) was the first javelin world record to be officially ratified by the International Association of Athletics Federations.

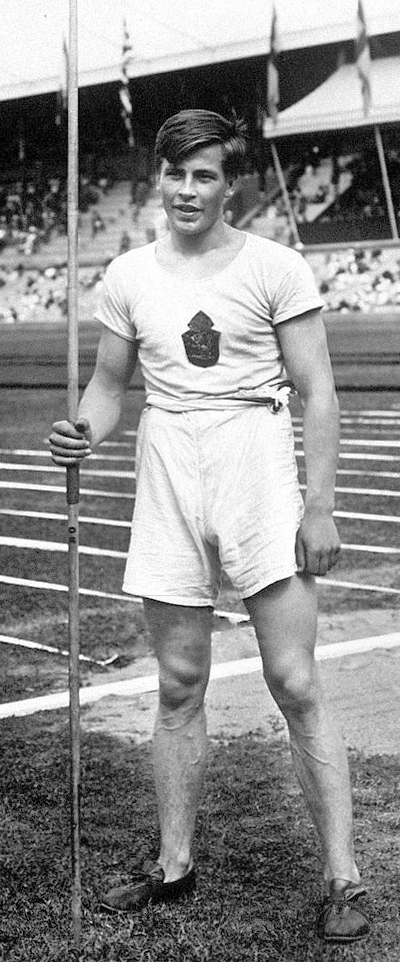
Julius Saaristo in 1912 Summer Olympics

In the late 19th and early 20th century, most javelin competitions were two-handed; the implement was thrown with the right hand and separately with the left hand, and the best marks for each hand were added together. Competitions for the better hand only were less common, though not unknown. At the Olympics, a both-hands contest was held only once, in 1912; Finland swept the medals, ahead of Lemming. After that, this version of the javelin rapidly faded into obscurity, together with similar variations of the shot and the discus; Sweden's Yngve Häckner, with his total of 114.28 m from 1917, was the last official both-hands world record holder.

Another early variant was the freestyle javelin, in which holding the javelin by the grip at the center of gravity was not mandatory; such a freestyle competition was held at the 1908 Olympics, but it was dropped from the program after that. Hungary's Mór Kóczán used a freestyle end grip to break the 60-metre barrier in 1911, a year before Lemming and Julius Saaristo first did so with a regular grip.

The first known women's javelin marks were recorded in Finland in 1909. Originally, women threw the same implement as men; a lighter, shorter javelin for women was introduced in the 1920s. Women's javelin throw was added to the Olympic program in 1932; Mildred "Babe" Didrikson of the United States became the first champion.

For a long time, javelins were made of solid wood, typically birch, with a steel tip. The hollow, highly aerodynamic Held javelin, invented by American thrower Bud Held and developed and manufactured by his brother Dick, was introduced in the 1950s; the first Held javelins were also wooden with steel tips, but later models were made entirely of metal. These new javelins flew further, but were also less likely to land neatly point first; as a response to the increasingly frequent flat or ambiguously flat landings, experiments with modified javelins started in the early 1980s. The resulting designs, which made flat landings much less common and reduced the distances thrown, became official for men starting in April 1986 and for women in April 1999, and the world records (then 104.80 m by Uwe Hohn, and 80.00 m by Petra Felke) were reset. The current (as of 2017) men's world record is held by Jan Železný at 98.48 m (1996); Barbora Špotáková holds the women's world record at 72.28 m (2008).

Of the 69 Olympic medals that have been awarded in the men's javelin, 32 have gone to competitors from Norway, Sweden or Finland. Finland is the only nation to have swept the medals at a currently recognized official Olympics, and has done so twice, in 1920 and 1932, in addition to its 1912 sweep in the two-handed javelin; in 1920 Finland swept the first four places, which is no longer possible as only three entrants per country are allowed. Finland has, however, never been nearly as successful in the women's javelin.

The javelin throw has been part of the decathlon since the decathlon was introduced in the early 1910s; the all-around, an earlier ten-event contest of American origin, did not include the javelin throw. The javelin was also part of some (though not all) of the many early forms of women's pentathlon and has always been included in the heptathlon after it replaced the pentathlon in 1981.

== Rules and competitions ==
The size, shape, minimum weight, and center of gravity of the javelin are all defined by World Athletics rules. In international competition, men throw a javelin between 2.6 and 2.7 m (8 ft 6 in and 8 ft 10 in) in length and 800 g (28 oz) in weight, and women throw a javelin between 2.2 and 2.3 m (7 ft 3 in and 7 ft 7 in) in length and 600 g (21 oz) in weight. The javelin has a grip, about 150 mm (5.9 in) wide, made of cord and located at the javelin's center of gravity (0.9 to 1.06 m (2 ft 11 in to 3 ft 6 in)) from the javelin tip for the men's javelin and 0.8 to 0.92 m (2 ft 7 in to 3 ft 0 in) from the javelin tip for the women's javelin.

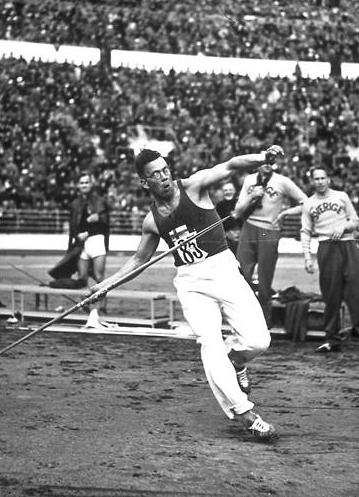
Matti Järvinen throwing the javelin at the 1932 Olympics

Unlike the other throwing events (shot put, discus, and hammer), the technique used to throw the javelin is dictated by World Athletics rules and "non-orthodox" techniques are not permitted. The javelin must be held at its grip and thrown overhand, over the athlete's shoulder or upper arm. Further, the athlete is prohibited from turning completely around or starting with their back facing the direction of the throw. This prevents athletes from attempting to spin and hurl the javelin sidearm in the style of a discus throw. This rule was put in place when a group of athletes began experimenting with a spin technique referred to as "free style". On 24 October 1956, Pentti Saarikoski threw 99.52 m (326 ft 6 in) using the technique holding the end of the javelin. Officials were so afraid of the out of control nature of the technique that the practice was banned through these rule specifications.

Instead of being confined to a circle, javelin throwers have a runway 4 m (13 ft) wide and at least 30 m (98 ft) in length, ending in an 8 m (26 ft) radius throwing arc from which their throw is measured; athletes typically use this distance to gain momentum in a "run-up" to their throw. Like the other throwing events, the competitor may not leave the throwing area (the runway) until after the implement lands. The need to come to a stop behind the throwing arc limits both how close the athlete can come to the line before the release as well as the maximum speed achieved at the time of release.

The javelin is thrown towards a 28.96º circular sector that is centered on the center point of the throwing arc. The angle of the throwing sector (28.96º) provides sector boundaries that are easy to construct and lay out on a field. A throw is only legal if the tip of the javelin lands within this sector, and is the first part of the javelin to strike the ground. The distance of the throw is measured from the throwing arc to the point where the tip of the javelin landed, rounded down to the nearest centimetre.

Competition rules are similar to other throwing events: a round consists of one attempt by each competitor in turn, and competitions typically consist of three to six rounds. The competitor with the longest single legal throw (over all rounds) is the winner; in case of a tie, the competitors' second-longest throws are also considered. Competitions involving large numbers of athletes sometimes use a cut whereby all competitors compete in the first three rounds but only those who are currently among the top eight or have achieved some minimum distances are permitted to attempt to improve on their distance in additional rounds (typically three).

The javelin is almost always thrown outdoors, though it is rarely thrown indoors. The world record for men's indoor javelin throw is 85.78 metres (281.4 ft) by Matti Närhi in 1996.

=== Javelin redesigns ===
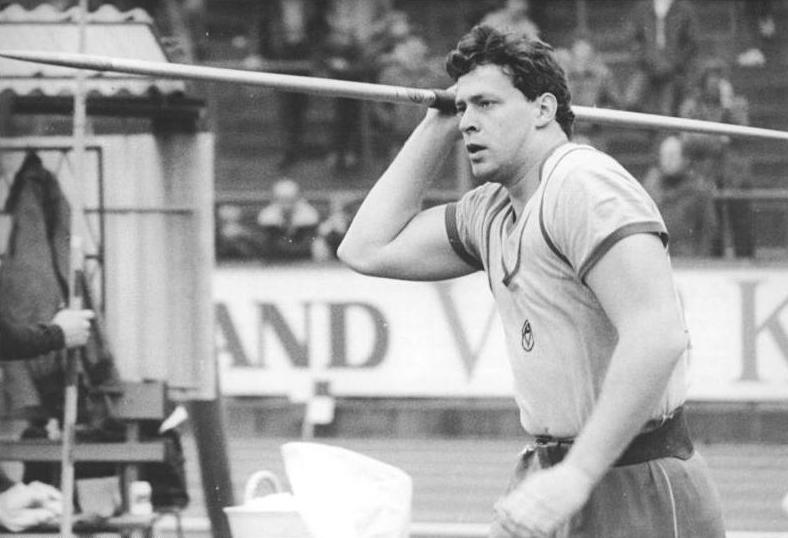
Uwe Hohn (pictured in 1984) holds the "eternal world record" with a throw of 104.80 m, as a new type of javelin (less debate of landing spot, less danger of reaching the spectators) was implemented in 1986.

On 1 April 1986, the men's javelin (800 grams (1.76 lb)) was redesigned by the governing body (the IAAF Technical Committee). They decided to change the rules for javelin design because of the increasingly frequent flat landings and the resulting discussions and protests when these attempts were declared valid or invalid by competition judges. The world record had also crept up to a potentially dangerous level, 104.80 m (343.8 ft) by Uwe Hohn. With throws exceeding 100 metres, it was becoming difficult to safely stage the competition within the confines of a stadium infield. The javelin was redesigned so that the centre of gravity was moved 4 cm (1.6 in) forward. In addition, the surface area in front of centre of gravity was reduced, while the surface area behind the centre of gravity was increased. This had an effect similar to that produced by the feathers on an arrow. The javelin turns into the relative wind. This relative wind appears to originate from the ground as the javelin descends, thus the javelin turns to face the ground. As the javelin turns into the wind less lift is generated, reducing the flight distance by around 10% but also causing the javelin to stick in the ground more consistently. In 1999, the women's javelin (600 grams (1.32 lb)) was similarly redesigned.

Modifications that manufacturers made to recover some of the lost distance, by increasing tail drag (using holes, rough paint or dimples), were forbidden at the end of 1991 and performances made using implements with such modifications removed from the record books. Seppo Räty had achieved a world record of 96.96 m (318.1 ft) in 1991 with such a design, but this record was nullified.

=== Weight rules by age group ===
The weight of the javelin in the Under-20 category is the same as the senior level.

	Men	Women
Age group	Weight	Weight
U14	400 g (14 oz)	
U16	600 g (1 lb 5 oz)	500 g (1 lb 2 oz)
U18	700 g (1 lb 9 oz)	500 g (1 lb 2 oz)
Junior (U20)	800 g (1 lb 12 oz)	600 g (1 lb 5 oz)
Senior	800 g (1 lb 12 oz)	600 g (1 lb 5 oz)
35–49	800 g (1 lb 12 oz)	600 g (1 lb 5 oz)
50–74		500 g (1 lb 2 oz)
50–59	700 g (1 lb 9 oz)	
60–69	600 g (1 lb 5 oz)	
70–79	500 g (1 lb 2 oz)	
75+		400 g (14 oz)
80+	400 g (14 oz)	

== Technique and training ==
Unlike other throwing events, javelin allows the competitor to build speed over a considerable distance. In addition, the core and upper body strength is necessary to deliver the implement, javelin throwers benefit from the agility and athleticism typically associated with running and jumping events. Thus, the athletes share more physical characteristics with sprinters than with others, although they still need the skill of heavier throwing athletes.

Traditional free-weight training is often used by javelin throwers. Metal-rod exercises and resistance band exercises can be used to train a similar action to the javelin throw to increase power and intensity. Without proper strength and flexibility, throwers can become extremely injury prone, especially in the shoulder and elbow. Core stability can help in the transference of physical power and force from the ground through the body to the javelin. Stretching and sprint training are used to enhance the speed of the athlete at the point of release, and subsequently, the speed of the javelin. At release, a javelin can reach speeds approaching 113 km/h (70 mph).

The javelin throw consists of three separate phases: the run-up, the transition, and the delivery. During each phase, the position of the javelin changes while the thrower changes his or her muscle recruitment. In the run-up phase as author Luann Voza states, "your arm is bent and kept close to your head, keeping the javelin in alignment with little to no arm movement". This allows the thrower's bicep to contract, flexing the elbow. In order for the javelin to stay up high, the thrower's deltoid flexes. In the transition phase, the thrower's "back muscles contract" as "the javelin is brought back in alignment with the shoulder with the thrower's palm up". This, according to Voza, "stretches your pectoral, or chest, muscles. From there, a stretch reflex, an involuntary contraction of your chest, helps bring your throwing arm forward with increased force". During the final phase, the rotation of the shoulders initiates the release, which then "transfers movement through the triceps muscles, wrists and fingers to extend the throwing arm forward to release the javelin".

== Culture ==
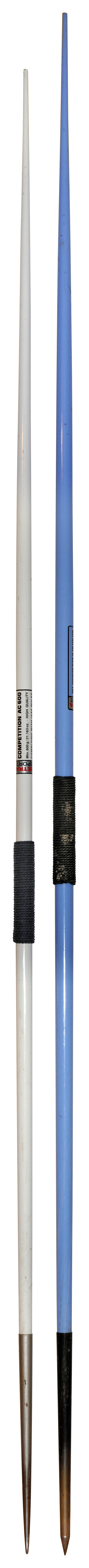
A women's (600-g, left) and men's (800-g, right) javelin.

In 1994, Michael Torke composed Javelin, commissioned by the Atlanta Committee for the Olympic Games in celebration of the Atlanta Symphony Orchestra's 50th anniversary season, in conjunction with the 1996 Summer Olympics.

Javelin throwers have been selected as a main motif in numerous collectors' coins. One of the recent samples is the €5 Finnish 10th IAAF World Championships in Athletics commemorative coin, minted in 2005 to commemorate the 2005 World Championships in Athletics. On the obverse of the coin, a javelin thrower is depicted. On the reverse, legs of hurdle runners with the Helsinki Olympic Stadium tower in the background can be seen.

== Area records ==
- Updated 4 October 2026.

Area	Men			Women		
Area	Mark	Season	Athlete	Mark	Season	Athlete
World	98.48 m (323 ft 1 in)	1996	Jan Železný (CZE)	72.28 m (237 ft 1 in)	2008	Barbora Špotáková (CZE)
Area records
Africa (records)	92.72 m (304 ft 2 in)	2015	Julius Yego (KEN)	69.35 m (227 ft 6 in)	2012	Sunette Viljoen (RSA)
Asia (records)	92.97 m (305 ft 0 in)	2024	Arshad Nadeem (PAK)	71.74 m (235 ft 4 in)	2026	Yan Ziyi (CHN)
Europe (records)	98.48 m (323 ft 1 in)	1996	Jan Železný (CZE)	72.28 m (237 ft 1 in)	2008	Barbora Špotáková (CZE)
North, Central America and Caribbean (records)	93.07 m (305 ft 4 in)	2022	Anderson Peters (GRN)	71.70 m (235 ft 2 in)	2005	Osleidys Menéndez (CUB)
Oceania (records)	89.02 m (292 ft 0 in)	2008	Jarrod Bannister (AUS)	68.92 m (226 ft 1 in)	2018	Kathryn Mitchell (AUS)
South America (records)	91.00 m (298 ft 6 in)	2025	Luiz Maurício da Silva (BRA)	67.34 m (220 ft 11 in)	2026	Flor Ruiz (COL)

== All-time top 25 (current models) ==
Tables show data for two definitions of "Top 25" - the top 25 javelin throw marks and the top 25 athletes:
- denotes top performance for athletes in the top 25 javelin throw marks
- denotes lesser performances, still in the top 25 javelin throw marks, by repeat athletes
- denotes top performance (only) for other top 25 athletes who fall outside the top 25 javelin throw marks

=== Men ===
- Correct as of June 2026.

Ath.#	Perf.#	Mark	Athlete	Nation	Date	Place	Ref.
1	1	98.48 m (323 ft 1 in)	Jan Železný	Czech Republic	25 May 1996	Jena	
2	2	97.76 m (320 ft 8 in)	Johannes Vetter	Germany	6 September 2020	Chorzów	
	3	96.29 m (315 ft 10 in)	Vetter #2		29 May 2021	Chorzów	
	4	95.66 m (313 ft 10 in)	Železný #2		29 August 1993	Sheffield	
	5	95.54 m (313 ft 5 in) A	Železný #3		6 April 1993	Pietersburg	
	6	94.64 m (310 ft 5 in)	Železný #4		31 May 1996	Ostrava	
	7	94.44 m (309 ft 10 in)	Vetter #3		11 July 2017	Luzern	
	8	94.20 m (309 ft 0 in)	Vetter #4		19 May 2021	Ostrava	
	9	94.02 m (308 ft 5 in)	Železný #5		26 March 1997	Stellenbosch	
3	10	93.90 m (308 ft 0 in)	Thomas Röhler	Germany	5 May 2017	Doha	
	11	93.88 m (308 ft 0 in)	Vetter #5		18 August 2017	Thum	
	12	93.59 m (307 ft 0 in)	Vetter #6		26 June 2021	Kuortane	
	13	93.20 m (305 ft 9 in)	Vetter #7		21 May 2021	Dessau	
4	14	93.09 m (305 ft 4 in)	Aki Parviainen	Finland	26 June 1999	Kuortane	
5	15	93.07 m (305 ft 4 in)	Anderson Peters	Grenada	13 May 2022	Doha	
6	16	92.97 m (305 ft 0 in)	Arshad Nadeem	Pakistan	8 August 2024	Saint-Denis	
	17	92.80 m (304 ft 5 in)	Železný #6		12 August 2001	Edmonton	
7	18	92.72 m (304 ft 2 in)	Julius Yego	Kenya	26 August 2015	Beijing	
	19	92.70 m (304 ft 1 in)	Vetter #8		11 March 2018	Leiria	
8	20	92.62 m (303 ft 10 in)	Rumesh Tharanga	Sri Lanka	4 June 2026	Rome	
9	21	92.61 m (303 ft 10 in)	Sergey Makarov	Russia	30 June 2002	Sheffield	
10	22	92.60 m (303 ft 9 in)	Raymond Hecht	Germany	14 August 1996	Zurich	
	23	92.42 m (303 ft 2 in)	Železný #7		28 May 1997	Ostrava	
	24	92.41 m (303 ft 2 in)	Parviainen #2		24 June 2001	Vaasa	
	25	92.28 m (302 ft 9 in)	Železný #8		9 September 1995	Monaco	
	25	92.28 m (302 ft 9 in)	Hecht #2		14 August 1996	Zurich	
11		92.06 m (302 ft 0 in)	Andreas Hofmann	Germany	2 June 2018	Offenburg	
12		91.69 m (300 ft 9 in)	Konstadinós Gatsioúdis	Greece	24 June 2000	Kuortane	
13		91.59 m (300 ft 5 in)	Andreas Thorkildsen	Norway	2 June 2006	Oslo	
14		91.53 m (300 ft 3 in)	Tero Pitkämäki	Finland	26 June 2005	Kuortane	
15		91.51 m (300 ft 2 in)	Julian Weber	Germany	28 August 2025	Zurich	
16		91.46 m (300 ft 0 in)	Steve Backley	Great Britain	25 January 1992	Auckland	
17		91.36 m (299 ft 8 in)	Cheng Chao-tsun	Chinese Taipei	26 August 2017	Taipei	
18		91.29 m (299 ft 6 in)	Breaux Greer	United States	21 June 2007	Indianapolis	
19		91.00 m (298 ft 6 in)	Luiz Maurício da Silva	Brazil	3 August 2025	São Paulo	
20		90.88 m (298 ft 1 in)	Jakub Vadlejch	Czech Republic	13 May 2022	Doha	
21		90.82 m (297 ft 11 in)	Kimmo Kinnunen	Finland	26 August 1991	Tokyo	
22		90.73 m (297 ft 8 in)	Vadims Vasiļevskis	Latvia	22 July 2007	Tallinn	
23		90.61 m (297 ft 3 in)	Magnus Kirt	Estonia	22 June 2019	Kuortane	
24		90.60 m (297 ft 2 in)	Seppo Räty	Finland	20 July 1992	Nurmijärvi	
25		90.44 m (296 ft 8 in)	Boris Henry	Germany	9 July 1997	Linz	

=== Women ===
- Correct as of September 2026.

Ath.#	Perf.#	Mark	Athlete	Nation	Date	Place	Ref.
1	1	72.28 m (237 ft 1 in)	Barbora Špotáková	Czech Republic	13 September 2008	Stuttgart	
2	2	71.74 m (235 ft 4 in)	Yan Ziyi	China	23 May 2026	Xiamen	
3	3	71.70 m (235 ft 2 in)	Osleidys Menéndez	Cuba	14 August 2005	Helsinki	
	4	71.58 m (234 ft 10 in)	Špotáková #2		2 September 2011	Daegu	
	5	71.54 m (234 ft 8 in)	Menéndez #2		1 July 2001	Rethymno	
	6	71.53 m (234 ft 8 in)	Menéndez #3		27 August 2004	Athens	
	7	71.42 m (234 ft 3 in)	Špotáková #3		21 August 2008	Beijing	
4	8	71.40 m (234 ft 3 in)	Maria Andrejczyk	Poland	9 May 2021	Split	
5	9	70.53 m (231 ft 4 in)	Mariya Abakumova	Russia	1 September 2013	Berlin	
	10	70.46 m (231 ft 2 in)	Yan #2		27 September 2026	Nagoya	
6	11	70.20 m (230 ft 3 in)	Christina Obergföll	Germany	23 June 2007	Munich	
	12	70.03 m (229 ft 9 in)	Obergföll #2		14 August 2005	Helsinki	
	13	69.82 m (229 ft 0 in)	Menéndez #4		29 August 2001	Beijing	
	14	69.81 m (229 ft 0 in)	Obergföll #3		31 August 2008	Elstal	
	15	69.75 m (228 ft 10 in)	Abakumova #2		25 August 2013	Elstal	
	16	69.57 m (228 ft 2 in)	Obergföll #4		8 September 2011	Zurich	
	17	69.55 m (228 ft 2 in)	Špotáková #4		9 August 2012	London	
	18	69.53 m (228 ft 1 in)	Menéndez #5		6 August 2001	Edmonton	
7	19	69.48 m (227 ft 11 in)	Trine Hattestad	Norway	28 July 2000	Oslo	
	20	69.45 m (227 ft 10 in)	Špotáková #5		22 July 2011	Monaco	
8	21	69.35 m (227 ft 6 in)	Sunette Viljoen	South Africa	9 June 2012	New York City	
	22	69.34 m (227 ft 5 in)	Abakumova #3		16 March 2013	Castellón	
9	23	69.19 m (227 ft 0 in)	Christin Hussong	Germany	30 May 2021	Chorzów	
	24	69.15 m (226 ft 10 in)	Špotáková #6		31 May 2008	Zaragoza	
	25	69.09 m (226 ft 8 in)	Abakumova #4		16 August 2013	Moscow	
10		68.92 m (226 ft 1 in)	Kathryn Mitchell	Australia	11 April 2018	Gold Coast	
10		68.92 m (226 ft 1 in)	Haruka Kitaguchi	Japan	12 September 2026	Budapest	
12		68.43 m (224 ft 6 in)	Sara Kolak	Croatia	6 July 2017	Lausanne	
13		68.34 m (224 ft 2 in)	Steffi Nerius	Germany	31 August 2008	Elstal	
14		68.11 m (223 ft 5 in)	Kara Winger	United States	2 September 2022	Brussels	
15		67.98 m (223 ft 0 in)	Lü Huihui	China	2 August 2019	Shenyang	
16		67.76 m (222 ft 3 in)	Victoria Hudson	Austria	28 June 2025	Maribor	
17		67.70 m (222 ft 1 in)	Kelsey-Lee Barber	Australia	9 July 2019	Lucerne	
18		67.69 m (222 ft 0 in)	Katharina Molitor	Germany	30 August 2015	Beijing	
19		67.67 m (222 ft 0 in)	Sonia Bisset	Cuba	6 July 2005	Salamanca	
20		67.51 m (221 ft 5 in)	Mirela Manjani	Greece	30 September 2000	Sydney	
21		67.47 m (221 ft 4 in)	Tatsiana Khaladovich	Belarus	7 June 2018	Oslo	
22		67.40 m (221 ft 1 in)	Nikola Ogrodníková	Czech Republic	26 May 2019	Offenburg	
22		67.40 m (221 ft 1 in)	Maggie Malone	United States	17 July 2021	East Stroudsburg	
24		67.34 m (220 ft 11 in)	Flor Ruiz Hurtado	Colombia	4 August 2026	Santo Domingo	
25		67.32 m (220 ft 10 in)	Linda Stahl	Germany	14 June 2014	New York City	

==== Annulled marks ====
- In 2011, Mariya Abakumova threw 71.99 metres. This performance was annulled due to doping offences.

== All-time top 5 (dimpled models 1990–1991) ==
Marks set using dimpled rough-tailed javelins manufactured by several companies were nullified effective 20 September 1991.

Rank	Mark	Athlete	Date	Place	Ref.
1	96.96	Seppo Räty (FIN)	2 June 1991	Punkalaidun	
2	91.36	Steve Backley (GBR)	15 September 1991	Sheffield	
3	90.84	Raymond Hecht (GER)	8 September 1991	Gengenbach	
4	90.82	Kimmo Kinnunen (FIN)	26 August 1991	Tokyo	
5	90.72	Jan Železný (TCH)	10 July 1991	Lausanne	

== All-time top 15 (old models) ==
=== Men ===
Rank	Mark	Athlete	Date	Place	Ref.
1	104.80	Uwe Hohn (GDR)	21 July 1984	Berlin	
2	99.72	Tom Petranoff (USA)	15 May 1983	Westwood	
3	96.72	Ferenc Paragi (HUN)	23 April 1980	Tata	
3	96.72	Detlef Michel (GDR)	9 June 1983	Berlin	
5	95.80	Bob Roggy (USA)	29 August 1982	Stuttgart	
6	95.10	Brian Crouser (USA)	5 August 1985	Eugene	
7	94.58	Miklós Németh (HUN)	26 July 1976	Montreal	
8	94.22	Michael Wessing (FRG)	3 August 1978	Oslo	
9	94.20	Heino Puuste (URS)	5 June 1983	Birmingham	
10	94.08	Klaus Wolfermann (FRG)	5 May 1973	Leverkusen	
11	94.06	Duncan Atwood (USA)	26 July 1985	Eugene	
12	93.90	Hannu Siitonen (FIN)	6 June 1973	Helsinki	
13	93.84	Pentti Sinersaari (FIN)	27 January 1979	Auckland	
14	93.80	Jānis Lūsis (URS)	6 July 1972	Stockholm	
15	93.70	Viktor Yevsyukov (URS)	17 July 1985	Kyiv	

=== Women ===
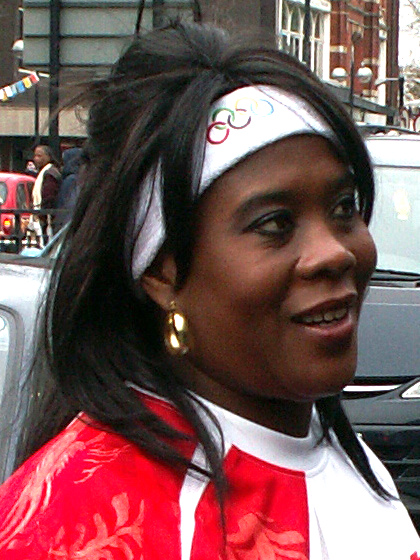
Tessa Sanderson appeared in every Summer Olympics from 1976 to 1996, winning the gold medal in the javelin at the 1984 Olympics. She was the first Black British woman to win an Olympic gold medal, and the second track and field athlete to compete at six Olympics. Sanderson won gold medals at three Commonwealth Games and at the 1992 IAAF World Cup. She set five Commonwealth records and ten British national records in the javelin, as well as records at junior and masters levels. Sanderson had a rivalry with fellow Briton Fatima Whitbread, who took the bronze in the 1984 Olympics.

Rank	Mark	Athlete	Date	Place	Ref.
1	80.00	Petra Felke (GDR)	8 September 1988	Potsdam	
2	77.44	Fatima Whitbread (GBR)	28 August 1986	Stuttgart	
3	74.76	Tiina Lillak (FIN)	13 June 1983	Tampere	
4	74.20	Sofia Sakorafa (GRE)	26 September 1982	Hania	
5	73.58	Tessa Sanderson (GBR)	26 June 1983	Edinburgh	
6	72.70	Anna Verouli (GRE)	20 May 1984	Hania	
7	72.16	Antje Kempe (GDR)	5 May 1984	Celje	
8	72.12	Trine Hattestad (NOR)	10 July 1993	Oslo	
9	71.88	Antoaneta Todorova (BUL)	15 August 1981	Zagreb	
10	71.82	Ivonne Leal (CUB)	30 August 1985	Leverkusen	
11	71.40	Natalya Shikolenko (BLR)	5 June 1994	Sevilla	
12	71.00	Silke Renk (GDR)	25 June 1988	Rostock	
13	70.76	Beate Koch (GDR)	22 June 1989	Rostock	
14	70.42	Zhang Li (CHN)	6 August 1990	Tianjin	
15	70.20	Karen Forkel (GER)	9 May 1991	Halle	

== Olympic medalists ==
=== Men ===
Games	Gold	Silver	Bronze
1908 London	Eric Lemming; Sweden	Arne Halse; Norway	Otto Nilsson; Sweden
1912 Stockholm	Eric Lemming; Sweden	Julius Saaristo; Finland	Mór Kóczán; Hungary
1920 Antwerp	Jonni Myyrä; Finland	Urho Peltonen; Finland	Pekka Johansson; Finland
1924 Paris	Jonni Myyrä; Finland	Gunnar Lindström; Sweden	Eugene Oberst; United States
1928 Amsterdam	Erik Lundqvist; Sweden	Béla Szepes; Hungary	Olav Sunde; Norway
1932 Los Angeles	Matti Järvinen; Finland	Matti Sippala; Finland	Eino Penttilä; Finland
1936 Berlin	Gerhard Stöck; Germany	Yrjö Nikkanen; Finland	Kalervo Toivonen; Finland
1948 London	Tapio Rautavaara; Finland	Steve Seymour; United States	József Várszegi; Hungary
1952 Helsinki	Cy Young; United States	Bill Miller; United States	Toivo Hyytiäinen; Finland
1956 Melbourne	Egil Danielsen; Norway	Janusz Sidło; Poland	Viktor Tsybulenko; Soviet Union
1960 Rome	Viktor Tsybulenko; Soviet Union	Walter Krüger; United Team of Germany	Gergely Kulcsár; Hungary
1964 Tokyo	Pauli Nevala; Finland	Gergely Kulcsár; Hungary	Jānis Lūsis; Soviet Union
1968 Mexico City	Jānis Lūsis; Soviet Union	Jorma Kinnunen; Finland	Gergely Kulcsár; Hungary
1972 Munich	Klaus Wolfermann; West Germany	Jānis Lūsis; Soviet Union	Bill Schmidt; United States
1976 Montreal	Miklós Németh; Hungary	Hannu Siitonen; Finland	Gheorghe Megelea; Romania
1980 Moscow	Dainis Kūla; Soviet Union	Aleksandr Makarov; Soviet Union	Wolfgang Hanisch; East Germany
1984 Los Angeles	Arto Härkönen; Finland	David Ottley; Great Britain	Kenth Eldebrink; Sweden
1988 Seoul	Tapio Korjus; Finland	Jan Železný; Czechoslovakia	Seppo Räty; Finland
1992 Barcelona	Jan Železný; Czechoslovakia	Seppo Räty; Finland	Steve Backley; Great Britain
1996 Atlanta	Jan Železný; Czech Republic	Steve Backley; Great Britain	Seppo Räty; Finland
2000 Sydney	Jan Železný; Czech Republic	Steve Backley; Great Britain	Sergey Makarov; Russia
2004 Athens	Andreas Thorkildsen; Norway	Vadims Vasiļevskis; Latvia	Sergey Makarov; Russia
2008 Beijing	Andreas Thorkildsen; Norway	Ainārs Kovals; Latvia	Tero Pitkämäki; Finland
2012 London	Keshorn Walcott; Trinidad and Tobago	Antti Ruuskanen; Finland	Vítězslav Veselý; Czech Republic
2016 Rio de Janeiro	Thomas Röhler; Germany	Julius Yego; Kenya	Keshorn Walcott; Trinidad and Tobago
2020 Tokyo	Neeraj Chopra; India	Jakub Vadlejch; Czech Republic	Vítězslav Veselý; Czech Republic
2024 Paris	Arshad Nadeem; Pakistan	Neeraj Chopra; India	Anderson Peters; Grenada
2028 Los Angeles			

=== Women ===
Games	Gold	Silver	Bronze
1932 Los Angeles	Babe Didrikson; United States	Ellen Braumüller; Germany	Tilly Fleischer; Germany
1936 Berlin	Tilly Fleischer; Germany	Luise Krüger; Germany	Maria Kwaśniewska; Poland
1948 London	Herma Bauma; Austria	Kaisa Parviainen; Finland	Lily Carlstedt; Denmark
1952 Helsinki	Dana Zátopková; Czechoslovakia	Aleksandra Chudina; Soviet Union	Yelena Gorchakova; Soviet Union
1956 Melbourne	Inese Jaunzeme; Soviet Union	Marlene Ahrens; Chile	Nadezhda Konyayeva; Soviet Union
1960 Rome	Elvīra Ozoliņa; Soviet Union	Dana Zátopková; Czechoslovakia	Birutė Kalėdienė; Soviet Union
1964 Tokyo	Mihaela Peneș; Romania	Márta Rudas; Hungary	Yelena Gorchakova; Soviet Union
1968 Mexico City	Angéla Németh; Hungary	Mihaela Peneș; Romania	Eva Janko; Austria
1972 Munich	Ruth Fuchs; East Germany	Jacqueline Todten; East Germany	Kate Schmidt; United States
1976 Montreal	Ruth Fuchs; East Germany	Marion Becker; West Germany	Kate Schmidt; United States
1980 Moscow	María Caridad Colón; Cuba	Saida Gunba; Soviet Union	Ute Hommola; East Germany
1984 Los Angeles	Tessa Sanderson; Great Britain	Tiina Lillak; Finland	Fatima Whitbread; Great Britain
1988 Seoul	Petra Felke; East Germany	Fatima Whitbread; Great Britain	Beate Koch; East Germany
1992 Barcelona	Silke Renk; Germany	Natalya Shikolenko; Unified Team	Karen Forkel; Germany
1996 Atlanta	Heli Rantanen; Finland	Louise McPaul; Australia	Trine Hattestad; Norway
2000 Sydney	Trine Hattestad; Norway	Mirela Maniani-Tzelili; Greece	Osleidys Menéndez; Cuba
2004 Athens	Osleidys Menéndez; Cuba	Steffi Nerius; Germany	Mirela Maniani; Greece
2008 Beijing	Barbora Špotáková; Czech Republic	Christina Obergföll; Germany	Goldie Sayers; Great Britain
2012 London	Barbora Špotáková; Czech Republic	Christina Obergföll; Germany	Linda Stahl; Germany
2016 Rio de Janeiro	Sara Kolak; Croatia	Sunette Viljoen; South Africa	Barbora Špotáková; Czech Republic
2020 Tokyo	Liu Shiying; China	Maria Andrejczyk; Poland	Kelsey-Lee Barber; Australia
2024 Paris	Haruka Kitaguchi; Japan	Jo-Ane van Dyk; South Africa	Nikola Ogrodníková; Czech Republic
2028 Los Angeles			

== World Championships medalists ==
=== Men ===
Championships	Gold	Silver	Bronze
1983 Helsinki	Detlef Michel (GDR)	Tom Petranoff (USA)	Dainis Kūla (URS)
1987 Rome	Seppo Räty (FIN)	Viktor Yevsyukov (URS)	Jan Železný (TCH)
1991 Tokyo	Kimmo Kinnunen (FIN)	Seppo Räty (FIN)	Vladimir Sasimovich (URS)
1993 Stuttgart	Jan Železný (CZE)	Kimmo Kinnunen (FIN)	Mick Hill (GBR)
1995 Gothenburg	Jan Železný (CZE)	Steve Backley (GBR)	Boris Henry (GER)
1997 Athens	Marius Corbett (RSA)	Steve Backley (GBR)	Konstadinos Gatsioudis (GRE)
1999 Seville	Aki Parviainen (FIN)	Konstadinos Gatsioudis (GRE)	Jan Železný (CZE)
2001 Edmonton	Jan Železný (CZE)	Aki Parviainen (FIN)	Konstadinos Gatsioudis (GRE)
2003 Saint-Denis	Sergey Makarov (RUS)	Andrus Värnik (EST)	Boris Henry (GER)
2005 Helsinki	Andrus Värnik (EST)	Andreas Thorkildsen (NOR)	Sergey Makarov (RUS)
2007 Osaka	Tero Pitkämäki (FIN)	Andreas Thorkildsen (NOR)	Breaux Greer (USA)
2009 Berlin	Andreas Thorkildsen (NOR)	Guillermo Martínez (CUB)	Yukifumi Murakami (JPN)
2011 Daegu	Matthias de Zordo (GER)	Andreas Thorkildsen (NOR)	Guillermo Martínez (CUB)
2013 Moscow	Vítězslav Veselý (CZE)	Tero Pitkämäki (FIN)	Dmitriy Tarabin (RUS)
2015 Beijing	Julius Yego (KEN)	Ihab Abdelrahman (EGY)	Tero Pitkämäki (FIN)
2017 London	Johannes Vetter (GER)	Jakub Vadlejch (CZE)	Petr Frydrych (CZE)
2019 Doha	Anderson Peters (GRN)	Magnus Kirt (EST)	Johannes Vetter (GER)
2022 Eugene	Anderson Peters (GRN)	Neeraj Chopra (IND)	Jakub Vadlejch (CZE)
2023 Budapest	Neeraj Chopra (IND)	Arshad Nadeem (PAK)	Jakub Vadlejch (CZE)
2025 Tokyo	Keshorn Walcott (TRI)	Anderson Peters (GRD)	Curtis Thompson (USA)

=== Women ===
Championships	Gold	Silver	Bronze
1983 Helsinki	Tiina Lillak (FIN)	Fatima Whitbread (GBR)	Anna Verouli (GRE)
1987 Rome	Fatima Whitbread (GBR)	Petra Felke-Meier (GDR)	Beate Peters (FRG)
1991 Tokyo	Xu Demei (CHN)	Petra Felke-Meier (GER)	Silke Renk (GER)
1993 Stuttgart	Trine Solberg-Hattestad (NOR)	Karen Forkel (GER)	Natalya Shikolenko (BLR)
1995 Gothenburg	Natalya Shikolenko (BLR)	Felicia Țilea-Moldovan (ROU)	Mikaela Ingberg (FIN)
1997 Athens	Trine Solberg-Hattestad (NOR)	Joanna Stone (AUS)	Tanja Damaske (GER)
1999 Seville	Mirela Manjani-Tzelili (GRE)	Tatyana Shikolenko (RUS)	Trine Solberg-Hattestad (NOR)
2001 Edmonton	Osleidys Menéndez (CUB)	Mirela Manjani-Tzelili (GRE)	Sonia Bisset (CUB)
2003 Saint-Denis	Mirela Maniani (GRE)	Tatyana Shikolenko (RUS)	Steffi Nerius (GER)
2005 Helsinki	Osleidys Menéndez (CUB)	Christina Obergföll (GER)	Steffi Nerius (GER)
2007 Osaka	Barbora Špotáková (CZE)	Christina Obergföll (GER)	Steffi Nerius (GER)
2009 Berlin	Steffi Nerius (GER)	Barbora Špotáková (CZE)	Monica Stoian (ROM)
2011 Daegu	Barbora Špotáková (CZE)	Sunette Viljoen (RSA)	Christina Obergföll (GER)
2013 Moscow	Christina Obergföll (GER)	Kim Mickle (AUS)	Mariya Abakumova (RUS)
2015 Beijing	Katharina Molitor (GER)	Lü Huihui (CHN)	Sunette Viljoen (RSA)
2017 London	Barbora Špotáková (CZE)	Li Lingwei (CHN)	Lü Huihui (CHN)
2019 Doha	Kelsey-Lee Barber (AUS)	Liu Shiying (CHN)	Lü Huihui (CHN)
2022 Eugene	Kelsey-Lee Barber (AUS)	Kara Winger (USA)	Haruka Kitaguchi (JPN)
2023 Budapest	Haruka Kitaguchi (JPN)	Flor Ruiz (COL)	Mackenzie Little (AUS)
2025 Tokyo	Juleisy Angulo (ECU)	Anete Sietiņa (LAT)	Mackenzie Little (AUS)

== World leading marks ==
=== Men ===
Year	Mark	Athlete	Place
1967	90.98	Jānis Lūsis (URS)	Odesa
1968	91.98	Jānis Lūsis (URS)	Saarijärvi
1969	92.70	Jorma Kinnunen (FIN)	Tampere
1970	92.64	Pauli Nevala (FIN)	Helsinki
1971	90.68	Jānis Lūsis (URS)	Helsinki
1972	93.80	Jānis Lūsis (URS)	Stockholm
1973	94.08	Klaus Wolfermann (FRG)	Leverkusen
1974	89.58	Hannu Siitonen (FIN)	Rome
1975	91.38	Miklós Németh (HUN)	Budapest
1976	94.58	Miklós Németh (HUN)	Montreal
1977	94.10	Miklós Németh (HUN)	Stockholm
1978	94.22	Michael Wessing (FRG)	Oslo
1979	93.84	Pentti Sinersaari (FIN)	Auckland
1980	96.72	Ferenc Paragi (HUN)	Tata
1981	92.48	Detlef Michel (GDR)	Berlin
1982	95.80	Bob Roggy (USA)	Stuttgart
1983	99.72	Tom Petranoff (USA)	Westwood
1984	104.80	Uwe Hohn (GDR)	Berlin
1985	96.96	Uwe Hohn (GDR)	Canberra

A new model was introduced in 1986, and all records started fresh.

Year	Mark	Athlete	Place
1986	85.74	Klaus Tafelmeier (FRG)	Como
1987	87.66	Jan Železný (TCH)	Nitra
1988	86.88	Jan Železný (TCH)	Leverkusen
1989	87.60	Kazuhiro Mizoguchi (JPN)	San José
1990	89.58	Steve Backley (GBR)	Stockholm
1991	90.82	Kimmo Kinnunen (FIN)	Tokyo
1992	91.46	Steve Backley (GBR)	Auckland
1993	95.66	Jan Železný (CZE)	Sheffield
1994	91.82	Jan Železný (CZE)	Sheffield
1995	92.60	Raymond Hecht (GER)	Oslo
1996	98.48	Jan Železný (CZE)	Jena
1997	94.02	Jan Železný (CZE)	Stellenbosch
1998	90.88	Aki Parviainen (FIN)	Tartu
1999	93.09	Aki Parviainen (FIN)	Kuortane
2000	91.69	Konstadinós Gatsioúdis (GRE)	Kuortane
2001	92.80	Jan Železný (CZE)	Edmonton
2002	92.61	Sergey Makarov (RUS)	Sheffield
2003	90.11	Sergey Makarov (RUS)	Dessau
2004	87.73	Aleksandr Ivanov (RUS)	Ostrava
2005	91.53	Tero Pitkämäki (FIN)	Kuortane
2006	91.59	Andreas Thorkildsen (NOR)	Oslo
2007	91.29	Breaux Greer (USA)	Indianapolis
2008	90.57	Andreas Thorkildsen (NOR)	Beijing
2009	91.28	Andreas Thorkildsen (NOR)	Zurich
2010	90.37	Andreas Thorkildsen (NOR)	Florø
2011	90.61	Andreas Thorkildsen (NOR)	Byrkjelo
2012	88.34	Vítězslav Veselý (CZE)	London
2013	89.03	Tero Pitkämäki (FIN)	Bad Köstritz
2014	89.21	Ihab Abdelrahman (EGY)	Shanghai
2015	92.72	Julius Yego (KEN)	Beijing
2016	91.28	Thomas Röhler (GER)	Turku
2017	94.44	Johannes Vetter (GER)	Lucerne
2018	92.70	Johannes Vetter (GER)	Leiria
2019	90.61	Magnus Kirt (EST)	Kuortane
2020	97.76	Johannes Vetter (GER)	Chorzów
2021	96.29	Johannes Vetter (GER)	Chorzów
2022	93.07	Anderson Peters (GRN)	Doha
2023	89.51	Jakub Vadlejch (CZE)	Turku
2024	92.97	Arshad Nadeem (PAK)	Paris
2025	91.51	Julian Weber (GER)	Zurich
2026	92.62	Rumesh Tharanga (SRI)	Rome

=== Women ===
Year	Mark	Athlete	Place
1973	66.10	Ruth Fuchs (GDR)	Edinburgh
1974	67.22	Ruth Fuchs (GDR)	Rome
1975	66.46	Ruth Fuchs (GDR)	Sudbury
1976	69.12	Ruth Fuchs (GDR)	Berlin
1977	69.32	Kate Schmidt (USA)	Fürth
1978	69.16	Ruth Fuchs (GDR)	Prague
1979	69.52	Ruth Fuchs (GDR)	Dresden
1980	70.08	Tatyana Biryulina (URS)	Podolsk
1981	71.88	Antoaneta Todorova (BUL)	Zagreb
1982	74.20	Sofia Sakorafa (GRE)	Hania
1983	74.76	Tiina Lillak (FIN)	Tampere
1984	74.72	Petra Felke (GDR)	Celje
1985	75.40	Petra Felke (GDR)	Schwerin
1986	77.44	Fatima Whitbread (GBR)	Stuttgart
1987	78.90	Petra Felke (GDR)	Leipzig
1988	80.00	Petra Felke (GDR)	Potsdam
1989	76.88	Petra Felke (GDR)	Macerata
1990	73.08	Petra Felke (GER)	Manaus
1991	71.44	Trine Hattestad (NOR)	Fana
1992	70.36	Natalya Shikolenko (BLR)	Moscow
1993	72.12	Trine Hattestad (NOR)	Oslo
1994	71.40	Natalya Shikolenko (BLR)	Seville
1995	71.18	Natalya Shikolenko (BLR)	Zurich
1996	69.42	Steffi Nerius (GER)	Monaco
1997	69.66	Trine Hattestad (NOR)	Helsinki
1998	70.10	Tanja Damaske (GER)	Berlin

A new model was introduced in 1999 and all records started fresh.

Year	Mark	Athlete	Place
1999	68.19	Trine Hattestad (NOR)	Fana
2000	69.48	Trine Hattestad (NOR)	Oslo
2001	71.54	Osleidys Menéndez (CUB)	Rethymno
2002	67.47	Miréla Manjani (GRE)	Munich
2003	66.52	Miréla Manjani (GRE)	Paris
2004	71.53	Osleidys Menéndez (CUB)	Athens
2005	71.70	Osleidys Menéndez (CUB)	Helsinki
2006	66.91	Christina Obergföll (GER)	Athens
2007	70.20	Christina Obergföll (GER)	Munich
2008	72.28	Barbora Špotáková (CZE)	Stuttgart
2009	68.59	Christina Obergföll (GER)	Leiria
2010	68.66	Barbora Špotáková (CZE)	Rome
2011	71.58	Barbora Špotáková (CZE)	Daegu
2012	69.55	Barbora Špotáková (CZE)	London
2013	70.53	Mariya Abakumova (RUS)	Berlin
2014	67.99	Barbora Špotáková (CZE)	Brussels
2015	67.69	Katharina Molitor (GER)	Beijing
2016	67.30	Vera Rebrik (RUS)	Sochi
2017	68.43	Sara Kolak (CRO)	Lausanne
2018	68.92	Kathryn Mitchell (AUS)	Gold Coast
2019	67.98	Lü Huihui (CHN)	Shenyang
2020	67.61	Lü Huihui (CHN)	Beijing
2021	71.40	Maria Andrejczyk (POL)	Split
2022	68.11	Kara Winger (USA)	Brussels
2023	67.38	Haruka Kitaguchi (JPN)	Brussels
2024	66.70	Flor Ruiz (COL)	Cuiaba
2025	67.76	Victoria Hudson (AUT)	Maribor
2026	71.74	Yan Ziyi (CHN)	Xiamen

== See also ==
- List of javelin throw national champions (men)
- List of javelin throwers
