= List of javelin throw national champions (men) =

Below a list of all national champions in the Men's javelin event in track and field from several countries since 1980.

== Australia ==
- 1980: Manfred Rohkämper
- 1981: Mike O'Rourke (NZL)
- 1982: Garry Calvert
- 1983: Dave Dixon
- 1984: Dave Dixon
- 1985: John Stapylton-Smith (NZL)
- 1986: Murray Keen
- 1987: Gavin Lovegrove (NZL)
- 1988: Ben Hodgson
- 1989: Gavin Lovegrove (NZL)
- 1990: Jean-Paul Lakafia (NCL)
- 1991: Yki Laine (FIN)
- 1992: Cameron Graham
- 1993: Andrew Currey
- 1994: Andrew Currey
- 1995: Andrew Currey
- 1996: Andrew Currey
- 1997: Adrian Hatcher
- 1998: Andrew Currey
- 1999: Andrew Currey
- 2000: Andrew Currey
- 2001: William Hamlyn-Harris
- 2002: Andrew Currey
- 2003: Andrew Currey
- 2004: William Hamlyn-Harris
- 2005: Oliver Dziubak
- 2006: Stuart Farquhar (NZL)
- 2007: Jarrod Bannister
- 2008: Mike Hazle
- 2009: Stuart Farquhar (NZL)

== Belarus ==
- 1992: Unknown
- 1993: Nikolay Kosyanok
- 1994: Oleg Gotsko
- 1995: Sergey Gordienko
- 1996: Andrey Khodasevich
- 1997: Vladimir Sasimovich
- 1998: Aleksandr Kulesh
- 1999: Igor Lisovskiy
- 2000: Vladimir Sasimovich
- 2001: Pavel Stasyuk
- 2002: Pavel Stasyuk
- 2003: Vladimir Sasimovich
- 2004: Mehdi Ravaei (IRI)
- 2005: Nikolay Vasilyachov
- 2006: Vadim Yautukhovich

== Belgium ==
- 1970: Louis Fortamps
- 1971: Lode Wijns
- 1972: Lode Wijns
- 1973: Lode Wijns
- 1974: Lode Wijns
- 1975: Lode Wijns
- 1976: Lode Wijns
- 1977: Lode Wijns
- 1978: Tony Duchateau
- 1979: Lode Wijns
- 1980: Luc Carlier
- 1981: Tony Duchateau
- 1982: Paul Deroo
- 1983: Tony Duchateau
- 1984: Jean-Paul Schlatter
- 1985: Jean-Paul Schlatter
- 1986: Frank Stockmans
- 1987: Jean-Paul Schlatter
- 1988: Jean-Paul Schlatter
- 1989: Frank Stockmans
- 1990: Jerome Putzeys
- 1991: Jean-Paul Schlatter
- 1992: Frank Stockmans
- 1993: Jean-Paul Schlatter
- 1994: Mark Van Mensel
- 1995: Johan Kloeck
- 1996: Mark Van Mensel
- 1997: Johan Kloeck
- 1998: Mark Van Mensel
- 1999: Johan Kloeck
- 2000: Mark Van Mensel
- 2001: Mark Van Mensel
- 2002: Mark Van Mensel
- 2003: Mark Van Mensel
- 2004: Mark Van Mensel
- 2005: Mark Van Mensel
- 2006: Loic Lemaitre
- 2007: Tom Goyvaerts
- 2008: Tom Goyvaerts
- 2009: Thomas Smet
- 2010: Tom Goyvaerts
- 2011: Tom Goyvaerts
- 2012: Tom Goyvaerts
- 2013: Thomas Smet
- 2014: Timothy Herman
- 2015: Timothy Herman
- 2016: Timothy Herman

== Canada ==
- 1980: Gheorghe Megelea
- 1981: Gheorghe Megelea
- 1982: Phil Olsen
- 1983: Phil Olsen
- 1984: Laslo Babits
- 1985: Laslo Babits
- 1986: Peter Massfeller
- 1987: Mike Olma
- 1988: Mike Mahovlich
- 1989: Mike Mahovlich
- 1990: Stephen Feraday
- 1991: Louis Breault
- 1992: Stephen Feraday
- 1993: Stephen Feraday
- 1994: Larry Steinke
- 1995: Erin Bevans
- 1996: Erin Bevans
- 1997: Erin Bevans
- 1998: Erin Bevans
- 1999: Erin Bevans
- 2000: Scott Russell
- 2001: Scott Russell
- 2002: Scott Russell
- 2003: Scott Russell
- 2004: Scott Russell
- 2005: Scott Russell
- 2006: Trevor Snyder
- 2007: Scott Russell
- 2008: Scott Russell
- 2009: Kyle Nielsen
- 2010: Curtis Moss
- 2011: Scott Russell
- 2012: Curtis Moss
- 2013: Kyle Nielsen
- 2014: Raymond Dykstra
- 2015: Caleb Jones

== PR China ==
- 1988: Ji Zhanzheng
- 1989: Wang Zhongwen
- 1990: Tang Linhua
- 1991: Zhang Lianbiao
- 1992: Zhang Lianbiao
- 1993: Zhang Lianbiao
- 1994: Zhang Lianbiao
- 1995: Zhang Lianbiao
- 1996: Zhang Lianbiao
- 1997: Gao Wenxu
- 1998: Li Rongxiang
- 1999: Li Rongxiang
- 2000: Zhang Lianbiao
- 2001: Li Rongxiang
- 2002: Li Rongxiang
- 2003: Li Rongxiang
- 2004: Chen Qi
- 2005: Chen Qi

== Czech Republic ==
- 1993: Miloš Steigauf
- 1994: Jan Železný
- 1995: Vladimír Novácek
- 1996: Jan Železný
- 1997: Patrick Landmesser
- 1998: Patrick Landmesser
- 1999: Patrick Landmesser
- 2000: Miroslav Guzdek
- 2001: Miroslav Guzdek
- 2002: Miroslav Guzdek
- 2003: Miroslav Guzdek
- 2004: Radek Pejrimovský
- 2005: Petr Belunek
- 2006: Jan Syrovátko

== Denmark ==
- 1980: Bent Larsen
- 1981: Bent Larsen
- 1982: Jørgen Jelstrøm
- 1983: Carsten Boysen
- 1984: Jørgen Jelstrøm
- 1985: Kenneth Petersen
- 1986: Kenneth Petersen
- 1987: Kenneth Petersen
- 1988: Kenneth Petersen
- 1989: Kenneth Petersen
- 1990: Arnt Pedersen
- 1991: Arnt Pedersen
- 1992: Kenneth Petersen
- 1993: Kenneth Petersen
- 1994: Kenneth Petersen
- 1995: Thomas Jørgensen
- 1996: Thomas Jørgensen
- 1997: Kenneth Petersen
- 1998: Kenneth Petersen
- 1999: Richard Askholm Knudsen
- 2000: Richard Askholm Knudsen
- 2001: Richard Askholm Knudsen
- 2002: Richard Askholm Knudsen
- 2003: Richard Askholm Knudsen
- 2004: Richard Askholm Knudsen
- 2005: Richard Askholm Knudsen
- 2006: Lars Møller
- 2007: Lars Møller

== Estonia ==
- 1917*: Aleksander Klumberg
- 1918*: Aleksander Klumberg
- 1919*: Aleksander Klumberg
- 1920: Aleksander Klumberg
- 1921: Aleksander Klumberg
- 1922: Aleksander Klumberg
- 1923: Aleksander Klumberg
- 1924: Aleksander Klumberg
- 1925: Johann Meimer
- 1926: Johann Meimer
- 1927: Aleksander Klumberg
- 1928: Johannes Schütz
- 1929: Gustav Sule
- 1930: Gustav Sule
- 1931: Gustav Sule
- 1932: Gustav Sule
- 1933: Gustav Sule
- 1934: Gustav Sule
- 1935: Gustav Sule
- 1936: Artur Mägi
- 1937: Gustav Sule
- 1938: Gustav Sule
- 1939: Artur Mägi
- 1940: Friedrich Issak
- 1941: -
- 1942: Paul Vares
- 1943: Endel Nääb
- 1944: Johannes Püss
- 1945: Harry Vallmann
- 1946: Friedrich Issak
- 1947: Friedrich Issak
- 1948: Ants Maiste
- 1949: Harry Vallmann
- 1950: Roland Ilves
- 1951: Ants Maiste
- 1952: Harry Vallmann
- 1953: John Põldsam
- 1954: Heino Tiik
- 1955: John Põldsam
- 1956: Charles Vallmann
- 1957: Charles Vallmann
- 1958: Mart Paama
- 1959: Charles Vallmann
- 1960: Charles Vallmann
- 1961: Mart Paama
- 1962: Charles Vallmann
- 1963: Mart Paama
- 1964: Charles Vallmann
- 1965: Mart Paama
- 1966: Toomas Savi
- 1967: Vambola Poljakov
- 1968: Mart Paama
- 1969: Mart Paama
- 1970: Mart Paama
- 1971: Mart Paama
- 1972: Mart Paama
- 1973: Mart Paama
- 1974: Ain Veenpere
- 1975: Heino Puuste
- 1976: Ain Veenpere
- 1977: Agu Rukki
- 1978: Kalju Mägi
- 1979: Heino Puuste
- 1980: Toivo Moorast
- 1981: Heino Puuste
- 1982: Toivo Moorast
- 1983: Toivo Moorast
- 1984: Ülo Rukki
- 1985: Marek Kaleta
- 1986: Olavi Malts
- 1987: Sulev Lepik
- 1988: Marek Kaleta
- 1989: Marek Kaleta
- 1990: Toivo Moorast
- 1991: Sulev Lepik
- 1992: Marek Kaleta
- 1993: Donald Sild
- 1994: Donald Sild
- 1995: Marek Kaleta
- 1996: Margus Kübar
- 1997: Donald Sild
- 1998: Heiko Väät
- 1999: Andrus Värnik
- 2000: Andrus Värnik
- 2001: Heiko Väät
- 2002: Rainer Raudsepp
- 2003: Andrus Värnik
- 2004: Andrus Värnik
- 2005: Andrus Värnik
- 2006: Andrus Värnik
- 2007: Risto Mätas
- 2008: Mihkel Kukk
- 2009: Tanel Laanmäe
- 2010: Ahti Peder
- 2011: Mihkel Kukk
- 2012: Risto Mätas
- 2013: Risto Mätas
- 2014: Tanel Laanmäe
- 2015: Magnus Kirt
- 2016: Tanel Laanmäe
- 2017: Magnus Kirt
- 2018: Magnus Kirt
- 2019: Magnus Kirt
- 2020: Ranno Koorep
- 2021: Ergo Tamm
- 2022: Magnus Kirt

* unofficial championships

== Finland ==
- 1980: Pentti Sinersaari
- 1981: Antero Toivonen
- 1982: Arto Härkönen
- 1983: Pentti Sinersaari
- 1984: Tero Saviniemi
- 1985: Seppo Räty
- 1986: Seppo Räty
- 1987: Tapio Korjus
- 1988: Tapio Korjus
- 1989: Seppo Räty
- 1990: Seppo Räty
- 1991: Seppo Räty
- 1992: Juha Laukkanen
- 1993: Seppo Räty
- 1994: Juha Laukkanen
- 1995: Seppo Räty
- 1996: Seppo Räty
- 1997: Sami Saksio
- 1998: Aki Parviainen
- 1999: Aki Parviainen
- 2000: Aki Parviainen
- 2001: Aki Parviainen
- 2002: Aki Parviainen
- 2003: Aki Parviainen
- 2004: Tero Pitkämäki
- 2005: Tero Pitkämäki
- 2006: Tero Pitkämäki
- 2007: Tero Pitkämäki
- 2008: Tero Järvenpää
- 2009: Teemu Wirkkala
- 2010: Tero Pitkämäki
- 2011: Ari Mannio
- 2012: Antti Ruuskanen
- 2013: Tero Pitkämäki
- 2014: Antti Ruuskanen
- 2015: Antti Ruuskanen
- 2016: Tero Pitkämäki
- 2017: Tero Pitkämäki
- 2018: Oliver Helander
- 2019: Lassi Etelätalo
- 2020: Lassi Etelätalo

== France ==
- 1980: Serge Leroy
- 1981: Penisio Lutui
- 1982: Péta Tauhavili
- 1983: Jean-Paul Lakafia
- 1984: Jean-Paul Lakafia
- 1985: Philippe Lecurieux
- 1986: Charlus Bertimon
- 1987: Pascal Lefèvre
- 1988: Pascal Lefèvre
- 1989: Pascal Lefèvre
- 1990: Pascal Lefèvre
- 1991: Pascal Lefèvre
- 1992: Pascal Lefèvre
- 1993: Pascal Lefèvre
- 1994: Pascal Lefèvre
- 1995: Pascal Lefèvre
- 1996: Alain Storaci
- 1997: Bouna Diop (SEN)
- 1998: Gaëtan Siakinuu-Schmidt
- 1999: Tommi Huotilainen (FIN)
- 2000: Laurent Dorique
- 2001: Laurent Dorique
- 2002: Gaëtan Siakinuu-Schmidt
- 2003: Dominique Pausé
- 2004: Stuart Farquhar (NZL)
- 2005: David Brisseault
- 2006: Vitolio Tipotio
- 2007: Vitolio Tipotio
- 2008: Laurent Dorique
- 2009: Vitolio Tipotio
- 2010: Jerome Haeffler
- 2011: Laurent Dorique
- 2012: Killian Durechou
- 2013: Vitolio Tipotio
- 2014: Jérémy Nicollin
- 2015: Jerome Haeffler
- 2016: Killian Durechou
- 2017: Jean-Baptiste Collet
- 2018: Jérémy Nicollin

== Germany ==
=== East Germany ===
- 1980: Detlef Michel
- 1981: Gerald Weiss
- 1982: Detlef Michel
- 1983: Detlef Michel
- 1984: Uwe Hohn
- 1985: Uwe Hohn
- 1986: Detlef Michel
- 1987: Detlef Michel
- 1988: Silvio Warsönke
- 1989: Volker Hadwich
- 1990: Raymond Hecht

=== West Germany ===
- 1980: Michael Wessing
- 1981: Helmut Schreiber
- 1982: Klaus Tafelmeier
- 1983: Klaus Tafelmeier
- 1984: Klaus Tafelmeier
- 1985: Klaus Tafelmeier
- 1986: Wolfram Gambke
- 1987: Klaus Tafelmeier
- 1988: Peter Blank
- 1989: Klaus-Peter Schneider
- 1990: Peter Blank

=== Unified Germany ===
- 1991: Klaus Tafelmeier
- 1992: Volker Hadwich
- 1993: Raymond Hecht
- 1994: Raymond Hecht
- 1995: Boris Henry
- 1996: Raymond Hecht
- 1997: Boris Henry
- 1998: Boris Henry
- 1999: Raymond Hecht
- 2000: Boris Henry
- 2001: Peter Blank
- 2002: Raymond Hecht
- 2003: Boris Henry
- 2004: Boris Henry
- 2005: Christian Nicolay
- 2006: Christian Nicolay
- 2007: Stephan Steding
- 2008: Tino Häber
- 2009: Mark Frank
- 2010: Matthias de Zordo
- 2011: Matthias de Zordo
- 2012: Thomas Röhler
- 2013: Thomas Röhler
- 2014: Thomas Röhler
- 2015: Thomas Röhler

== Great Britain ==
- 1980: Miklós Németh (HUN)
- 1981: Mike O'Rourke (NZL)
- 1982: David Ottley
- 1983: Mike O'Rourke (NZL)
- 1984: David Ottley
- 1985: David Ottley
- 1986: David Ottley
- 1987: Mick Hill
- 1988: David Ottley
- 1989: Steve Backley
- 1990: Mick Hill
- 1991: Mick Hill
- 1992: Steve Backley
- 1993: Colin Mackenzie
- 1994: Mick Hill
- 1995: Mick Hill
- 1996: Nick Nieland
- 1997: Mark Roberson
- 1998: Steve Backley
- 1999: Steve Backley
- 2000: Steve Backley
- 2001: Mark Roberson
- 2002: Mick Hill
- 2003: Mick Hill
- 2004: Steve Backley
- 2005: Nick Nieland
- 2006: Nick Nieland
- 2007: Nick Nieland

== Hungary ==
- 1980: Miklós Németh
- 1981: Miklós Németh
- 1982: Ferenc Paragi
- 1983: Miklós Németh
- 1984: András Temesi
- 1985: András Temesi
- 1986: Tamás Bolgár
- 1987: László Stefán
- 1988: Attila Bareith
- 1989: László Stefán
- 1990: Ferenc Knausz
- 1991: László Palotai
- 1992: Lajos Varga
- 1993: József Belák
- 1994: József Belák
- 1995: József Belák
- 1996: József Belák
- 1997: József Belák
- 1998: József Belák
- 1999: Gergely Horváth
- 2000: Gergely Horváth
- 2001: Gergely Horváth
- 2002: Gergely Horváth
- 2003: Gergely Horváth
- 2004: Gergely Horváth
- 2005: Gergely Horváth
- 2006: Csongor Olteán
- 2007: Csongor Olteán
- 2008: Csongor Olteán
- 2009: Csongor Olteán
- 2010: Krisztián Török
- 2011: Krisztián Török

== India ==
- 2020: Neeraj Chopra

== Ireland ==
- 1980: Peter Ruffli
- 1981: Harry Southern
- 1982: Mark O'Connor
- 1983: Kevin McBrearty
- 1984: Terry McHugh
- 1985: Terry McHugh
- 1986: Terry McHugh
- 1987: Terry McHugh
- 1988: Terry McHugh
- 1989: Terry McHugh
- 1990: Terry McHugh
- 1991: Terry McHugh
- 1992: Terry McHugh
- 1993: Terry McHugh
- 1994: Terry McHugh
- 1995: Terry McHugh
- 1996: Terry McHugh
- 1997: Terry McHugh
- 1998: Terry McHugh
- 1999: Terry McHugh
- 2000: Terry McHugh
- 2001: Terry McHugh
- 2002: Terry McHugh
- 2003: Terry McHugh
- 2004: Terry McHugh
- 2005: Michael McConkey (NIR)
- 2006: Niall Tuckey

== Italy ==
- 1980: Vanni Rodeghiero
- 1981: Agostino Ghesini
- 1982: Agostino Ghesini
- 1983: Agostino Ghesini
- 1984: Agostino Ghesini
- 1985: Fabio Michielon
- 1986: Agostino Ghesini
- 1987: Fabio de Gaspari
- 1988: Fabio de Gaspari
- 1989: Fabio de Gaspari
- 1990: Fabio de Gaspari
- 1991: Fabio de Gaspari
- 1992: Fabio de Gaspari
- 1993: Fabio de Gaspari
- 1994: Carlo Sonego
- 1995: Giuseppe Soffiato
- 1996: Fabio de Gaspari
- 1997: Fabio de Gaspari
- 1998: Armin Kerer
- 1999: Carlo Sonego
- 2000: Armin Kerer
- 2001: Alberto Desiderio
- 2002: Paolo Valt
- 2003: Francesco Pignata
- 2004: Francesco Pignata
- 2005: Francesco Pignata
- 2006: Francesco Pignata
- 2007: Daniele Crivellaro
- 2008: Roberto Bertolini
- 2009: Roberto Bertolini
- 2010: Roberto Bertolini
- 2011: Leonardo Gottardo
- 2012: Giacomo Puccini
- 2013: Norbert Bonvecchio
- 2014: Norbert Bonvecchio
- 2015: Roberto Bertolini
- 2016: Norbert Bonvecchio
- 2017: Mauro Fraresso
- 2018: Mauro Fraresso
- 2019: Mauro Fraresso

== Japan ==
- 1980: Toshihiko Takeda
- 1981: Masami Yoshida
- 1982: Yoshinori Kuriyama
- 1983: Masami Yoshida
- 1984: Masami Yoshida
- 1985: Kazuhiro Mizoguchi
- 1986: Masanori Amano
- 1987: Kazuhiro Mizoguchi
- 1988: Kazuhiro Mizoguchi
- 1989: Kazuhiro Mizoguchi
- 1990: Dmitriy Polyunik (RUS)
- 1991: Patrik Bodén (SWE)
- 1992: Masami Yoshida
- 1993: Takahiro Yamada
- 1994: Kazuhiro Mizoguchi
- 1995: Kazuhiro Mizoguchi
- 1996: Kazuhiro Mizoguchi
- 1997: Toro Ue
- 1998: Toro Ue
- 1999: Mikio Tamura
- 2000: Yukifumi Murakami
- 2001: Yukifumi Murakami
- 2002: Yukifumi Murakami
- 2003: Yukifumi Murakami
- 2004: Yukifumi Murakami
- 2005: Yukifumi Murakami
- 2006: Yukifumi Murakami
- 2007: Yukifumi Murakami
- 2008: Yukifumi Murakami
- 2009: Yukifumi Murakami
- 2010: Yukifumi Murakami
- 2011: Yukifumi Murakami
- 2012: Genki Dean

== Latvia ==
- 1991: Normunds Pildavs
- 1992: Normunds Pildavs
- 1993: Mārcis Štrobinders
- 1994: Mārcis Štrobinders
- 1995: Mārcis Štrobinders
- 1996: Mārcis Štrobinders
- 1997: Ēriks Rags
- 1998: Voldemārs Lūsis
- 1999: Ēriks Rags
- 2000: Ēriks Rags
- 2001: Ēriks Rags
- 2002: Ēriks Rags
- 2003: Ēriks Rags
- 2004: Voldemārs Lūsis
- 2005: Ainārs Kovals
- 2006: Ēriks Rags
- 2008: Vadims Vasiļevskis
- 2009: Ēriks Rags
- 2010: Ēriks Rags

== Lithuania ==
- 1990: Kestutis Mikša
- 1991: Tom Pukstys (USA)
- 1992: Arûnas Jurkšas
- 1993: Arûnas Jurkšas
- 1994: Arûnas Jurkšas
- 1995: Arûnas Jurkšas
- 1996: Arûnas Jurkšas
- 1997: Arûnas Jurkšas
- 1998: Arûnas Jurkšas
- 1999: Arûnas Jurkšas
- 2000: Arûnas Jurkšas
- 2001: Tomas Intas
- 2002: Arûnas Jurkšas
- 2003: Arûnas Jurkšas
- 2004: Tomas Intas
- 2005: Tomas Intas
- 2006: Tomas Intas
- 2007:
- 2008:
- 2009: Tomas Intas

== Netherlands ==
- 1980: Bert Smit
- 1981: Bert Smit
- 1982: Jeroen van der Meer
- 1983: Bert Smit
- 1984: Bert Smit
- 1985: Bert Smit
- 1986: Marcel Bunck
- 1987: Jeroen van der Meer
- 1988: Jeroen van der Meer
- 1989: Jeroen van der Meer
- 1990: Jeroen van der Meer
- 1991: Jeroen van der Meer
- 1992: Johan van Lieshout
- 1993: Johan van Lieshout
- 1994: Johan van Lieshout
- 1995: Johan van Lieshout
- 1996: Johan van Lieshout
- 1997: Johan van Lieshout
- 1998: Johan van Lieshout
- 1999: Johan van Lieshout
- 2000: Oscar Schermer
- 2001: Oscar Schermer
- 2002: Elliott Thijssen
- 2003: Elliott Thijssen
- 2004: Elliott Thijssen
- 2005: Bjorn Blommerde
- 2006: Elliott Thijssen
- 2007: Elliott Thijssen
- 2008: Bjorn Blommerde
- 2009: Bjorn Blommerde
- 2010: Bjorn Blommerde
- 2011: Bjorn Blommerde
- 2012: Bjorn Blommerde
- 2013: Bjorn Blommerde
- 2014: Jurriaan Wouters
- 2015: Daan Meyer
- 2016: Mart ten Berge

== New Zealand ==
- 1980: Mike O'Rourke
- 1981: Mike O'Rourke
- 1982: Mike O'Rourke
- 1983: Dave Hookway
- 1984: John Stapylton-Smith
- 1985: John Stapylton-Smith
- 1986: John Stapylton-Smith
- 1987: Gavin Lovegrove
- 1988: Mike O'Rourke
- 1989: John Stapylton-Smith
- 1990: Gavin Lovegrove
- 1991: Gavin Lovegrove
- 1992: Gavin Lovegrove
- 1993: Gavin Lovegrove
- 1994: Gavin Lovegrove
- 1995: Andrew Harrison
- 1996: Diggory Brooke
- 1997: Diggory Brooke
- 1998: Diggory Brooke
- 1999: Vladimir Ovchinnikov (RUS)
- 2000: James Goulding (FIJ)
- 2001: Andrew Harrison
- 2002: Joachim Kiteau (NCL)
- 2003: Stuart Farquhar
- 2004: Park Jae-Myong (KOR)
- 2005: Stuart Farquhar
- 2006: Stuart Farquhar
- 2007: Stuart Farquhar
- 2008: Stuart Farquhar
- 2009: Stuart Farquhar
- 2010: Stuart Farquhar
- 2011: Stuart Farquhar
- 2012: Stuart Farquhar
- 2013: Stuart Farquhar
- 2014: Stuart Farquhar
- 2015: Stuart Farquhar
- 2016: Stuart Farquhar

== Norway ==
- 1980: Per Erling Olsen
- 1981: Per Erling Olsen
- 1982: Per Erling Olsen
- 1983: Per Erling Olsen
- 1984: Per Erling Olsen
- 1985: Narve Hoff
- 1986: Øystein Slettevold
- 1987: Narve Hoff
- 1988: Reidar Lorentzen
- 1989: Reidar Lorentzen
- 1990: Arne Indrebø
- 1991: Reidar Lorentzen
- 1992: Pål Berntsen
- 1993: Arne Indrebø
- 1994: Håvard Johansen
- 1995: Arne Indrebø
- 1996: Pål Arne Fagernes
- 1997: Arne Indrebø
- 1998: Pål Arne Fagernes
- 1999: Pål Arne Fagernes
- 2000: Ronny Nilsen
- 2001: Andreas Thorkildsen
- 2002: Pål Arne Fagernes
- 2003: Andreas Thorkildsen
- 2004: Andreas Thorkildsen
- 2005: Andreas Thorkildsen
- 2006: Andreas Thorkildsen

== Poland ==
- 1980: Dariusz Adamus
- 1981: Michał Wacławik
- 1982: Michał Wacławik
- 1983: Dariusz Adamus
- 1984: Stanisław Witek
- 1985: Mirosław Szybowski
- 1986: Stanisław Górak
- 1987: Mirosław Witek
- 1988: Mirosław Witek
- 1989: Stanisław Witek
- 1990: Stanisław Witek
- 1991: Czesław Uhl
- 1992: Rajmund Kółko
- 1993: Tomasz Damszel
- 1994: Mirosław Witek
- 1995: Rajmund Kółko
- 1996: Dariusz Trafas
- 1997: Rajmund Kółko
- 1998: Dariusz Trafas
- 1999: Dariusz Trafas
- 2000: Grzegorz Krasiński
- 2001: Dariusz Trafas
- 2002: Dariusz Trafas
- 2003: Dariusz Trafas
- 2004: Rajmund Kółko
- 2005: Dariusz Trafas
- 2006: Dariusz Trafas
- 2007: Igor Janik
- 2008: Igor Janik
- 2009: Adrian Markowski
- 2010: Igor Janik
- 2011: Łukasz Grzeszczuk
- 2012: Igor Janik
- 2013: Hubert Chmielak
- 2014: Łukasz Grzeszczuk
- 2015: Marcin Krukowski
- 2016: Marcin Krukowski
- 2017: Marcin Krukowski
- 2018: Marcin Krukowski
- 2019: Marcin Krukowski

== Portugal ==
- 1980: Mário Silva
- 1981: Mário Silva
- 1982: Carlos Cunha
- 1983: Paulo Santos
- 1984: Paulo Santos
- 1985: Carlos Cunha
- 1986: Carlos Cunha
- 1987: Paulo Santos
- 1988: Carlos Cunha
- 1989:Carlos Cunha
- 1990: Carlos Cunha
- 1991: Carlos Cunha
- 1992: Carlos Cunha
- 1993: Carlos Cunha
- 1994: Carlos Cunha
- 1995: João Reis
- 1996: João Reis
- 1997: Carlos Cunha
- 1998: Filipe Ventura
- 1999: Filipe Ventura
- 2000: João Reis
- 2001: Filipe Ventura
- 2002: João Reis
- 2003: André Medeiros
- 2004: Elias Leal
- 2005: Filipe Ventura
- 2006: Filipe Ventura
- 2007: Elias Leal
- 2008: Elias Leal
- 2009: Luís Almeida
- 2010: Luís Almeida
- 2011: Tiago Aperta
- 2012: Tiago Aperta
- 2013: Tiago Aperta
- 2014: Tiago Aperta
- 2015: Tiago Aperta
- 2016: Tiago Aperta
- 2017: Tiago Aperta

== Russia ==
- 1992: Lev Shatilo
- 1993: Yuriy Rybin
- 1994: Yuriy Rybin
- 1995: Vladimir Ovchinnikov
- 1996: Sergey Makarov
- 1997: Sergey Makarov
- 1998: Yuriy Rybin
- 1999: Yuriy Rybin
- 2000: Sergey Makarov
- 2001: Sergey Makarov
- 2002: Aleksandr Ivanov
- 2003: Sergey Makarov
- 2004: Aleksandr Ivanov
- 2005: Sergey Makarov
- 2006: Sergey Makarov

== South Africa ==
- 1980: Herman Potgieter
- 1981: Herman Potgieter
- 1982: Herman Potgieter
- 1983: Herman Potgieter
- 1984: Herman Potgieter
- 1985: Chris de Beer
- 1986: Chris de Beer
- 1987: Hendrik Liebenberg
- 1988: Herman Potgieter
- 1989: Tom Petranoff (USA)
- 1990: Tom Petranoff (USA)
- 1991: Tom Petranoff
- 1992: Tom Petranoff
- 1993: Tom Petranoff
- 1994: Louis Fouché
- 1995: Phillip Spies
- 1996: Louis Fouché
- 1997: Marius Corbett
- 1998: Marius Corbett
- 1999: Marius Corbett
- 2000: Marius Corbett
- 2001: Marius Corbett
- 2002: Gerhardus Pienaar
- 2003: Gerhardus Pienaar
- 2004: Gerhardus Pienaar
- 2005: Lohan Rautenbach
- 2006: Gerhardus Pienaar

== Spain ==
Spain's national champions are as follows.

- 1980: Miguel Cánovas
- 1981: Augusto Lao
- 1982: Augusto Lao
- 1983: Antonio Lago
- 1984: Antonio Lago
- 1985: Juan José Rosell
- 1986: Julián Sotelo
- 1987: Antonio Lago
- 1988: Julián Sotelo
- 1989: Enric Bassols
- 1990: Julián Sotelo
- 1991: Julián Sotelo
- 1992: Julián Sotelo
- 1993: Raimundo Fernández
- 1994: Julián Sotelo
- 1995: Julián Sotelo
- 1996: Raimundo Fernández
- 1997: Antonio Esteban
- 1998: Alejandro García
- 1999: Gustavo Dacal
- 2000: Gustavo Dacal
- 2001: Eduardo Veranes
- 2002: Gustavo Dacal
- 2003: Gustavo Dacal
- 2004: Gustavo Dacal
- 2005: Gustavo Dacal
- 2006: Gustavo Dacal
- 2007: Gustavo Dacal
- 2008: Gustavo Dacal
- 2009: Gustavo Dacal
- 2010: Rafael Baraza
- 2011: Rafael Baraza
- 2012: Jordi Sánchez
- 2013: Manuel Uriz
- 2014: Jordi Sánchez

== Sweden ==
- 1980: Lars Henriksson
- 1981: Olavi Kolehmainen
- 1982: Kenth Eldebrink
- 1983: Olavi Kolehmainen
- 1984: Kenth Eldebrink
- 1985: Dag Wennlund
- 1986: Dag Wennlund
- 1987: Peter Borglund
- 1988: Peter Borglund
- 1989: Peter Borglund
- 1990: Peter Borglund
- 1991: Dag Wennlund
- 1992: Patrik Bodén
- 1993: Patrik Bodén
- 1994: Patrik Bodén
- 1995: Patrik Bodén
- 1996: Peter Borglund
- 1997: Patrik Bodén
- 1998: Patrik Bodén
- 1999: Patrik Bodén
- 2000: Mikael Snällfot
- 2001: Daniel Ragnvaldsson
- 2002: Daniel Ragnvaldsson
- 2003: Daniel Ragnvaldsson
- 2004: Mikael Snällfot
- 2005: Daniel Ragnvaldsson
- 2006: Magnus Arvidsson
- 2007: Magnus Arvidsson
- 2008: Magnus Arvidsson
- 2009: Daniel Ragnvaldsson
- 2010: Daniel Ragnvaldsson
- 2011: Kim Amb
- 2012: Kim Amb

== Ukraine ==
- 1992: Andriy Maznichenko
- 1993: Andriy Novikov
- 1994: Andriy Maznichenko
- 1995: Andriy Uglov
- 1996: Andriy Uglov
- 1997: Andriy Maznichenko
- 1998: Serhiy Volochay
- 1999: Yuriy Drozdov
- 2000: Oleh Stetsenko
- 2001: Oleh Stetsenko
- 2002: Oleh Stetsenko
- 2003: Oleh Stetsenko
- 2004: Oleh Stetsenko
- 2005: Oleh Stetsenko
- 2006: Roman Avramenko
- 2007: Oleh Stetsenko
- 2008: Roman Avramenko
- 2009: Oleksandr Pyatnytsya
- 2010: Dmytro Kosynskyy
- 2011: Oleksandr Pyatnytsya
- 2012: Oleksandr Pyatnytsya
- 2013: Yuriy Kushniruk
- 2014: Dmytro Kosynskyy
- 2015: Dmytro Kosynskyy
- 2016: Dmytro Kosynskyy
- 2017: Dmytro Sheremet
- 2018: Yuriy Kushniruk
- 2019: Oleksandr Nychyporchuk
- 2020: Oleksandr Nychyporchuk

== United States ==
- 1980: Duncan Atwood
- 1981: Bruce Kennedy
- 1982: Bob Roggy
- 1983: Rod Ewaliko
- 1984: Curt Ransford
- 1985: Tom Petranoff
- 1986: Tom Petranoff
- 1987: Duncan Atwood
- 1988: Dave Stephens
- 1989: Mike Barnett
- 1990: Vince Labosky
- 1991: Mike Barnett
- 1992: Tom Pukstys
- 1993: Tom Pukstys
- 1994: Todd Riech
- 1995: Tom Pukstys
- 1996: Todd Riech
- 1997: Tom Pukstys
- 1998: Tom Pukstys
- 1999: Tom Pukstys
- 2000: Breaux Greer
- 2001: Breaux Greer
- 2002: Breaux Greer
- 2003: Breaux Greer
- 2004: Breaux Greer
- 2005: Breaux Greer
- 2006: Breaux Greer
- 2007: Breaux Greer
- 2008: Bobby Smith
- 2009: Chris Hill
- 2010: Sean Furey
- 2011: Mike Hazle
- 2012: Sam Humphreys
- 2013: Riley Dolezal
- 2014: Sean Furey
- 2015: Sean Furey
- 2016: Sean Furey
- 2017: Riley Dolezal
