= Athletics at the 1988 Summer Olympics – Men's javelin throw =

Men's javelin throw at the Games of the XXV Olympiad
- Venues: Seoul Olympic Stadium
- Dates: September 24 (qualifications); September 25 (final)
- Competitors: 38 from 22 nations
- Winning distance: 84.28

Medalists
1st place, gold medalist(s)		Tapio Korjus; Finland
2nd place, silver medalist(s)		Jan Železný; Czechoslovakia
3rd place, bronze medalist(s)		Seppo Räty; Finland

The men's javelin throw event at the 1988 Summer Olympics in Seoul, South Korea had an entry list of 38 competitors, with two qualifying groups (38 throwers) before the final (12) took place on Sunday September 25, 1988. This was the first time that the competitors had to use the new javelin. The qualification mark was set at 79.00 metres.

== Medalists ==
Gold	Tapio Korjus; Finland
Silver	Jan Železný; Czechoslovakia
Bronze	Seppo Räty; Finland

== Schedule ==
- All times are Korea Standard Time (UTC+9)

Qualification Round
Group A	Group B
24.09.1988 – 09:40h	24.09.1988 – 11:00h
Final Round
25.09.1988 – 12:00h

== Abbreviations ==
- All results shown are in metres

Q	automatic qualification
q	qualification by rank
DNS	did not start
NM	no mark
OR	olympic record
WR	world record
AR	area record
NR	national record
PB	personal best
SB	season best

== Records ==
Standing records prior to the 1988 Summer Olympics
World Record	Jan Železný (TCH)	87.66 m	May 31, 1987	Nitra, Czechoslovakia
Olympic Record	Miklós Németh (HUN)	94.58 m	July 25, 1976	Montreal, Canada
Broken records during the 1988 Summer Olympics
Olympic Record	Seppo Räty (FIN)	76.76 m	September 24, 1988	Seoul, South Korea
Olympic Record	Kazuhiro Mizoguchi (JPN)	77.44 m	September 24, 1988	Seoul, South Korea
Olympic Record	Peter Borglund (SWE)	78.66 m	September 24, 1988	Seoul, South Korea
Olympic Record	Jan Železný (TCH)	85.90 m	September 24, 1988	Seoul, South Korea

== Qualification ==
=== Group A ===
Rank	Overall	Athlete	Attempts			Distance
Rank	Overall	Athlete	1	2	3	Distance
1	1	Jan Železný (TCH)	85.90	—	—	85.90 m
2	2	Seppo Räty (FIN)	76.76	77.70	81.62	81.62 m
3	6	Vladimir Ovchinnikov (URS)	X	77.68	80.26	80.26 m
4	7	Kimmo Kinnunen (FIN)	77.22	80.24	—	80.24 m
5	8	Gerald Weiß (GDR)	78.20	74.80	80.22	80.22 m
6	9	Peter Borglund (SWE)	78.66	73.76	80.16	80.16 m
7	10	Sejad Krdžalić (YUG)	72.40	78.06	79.90	79.90 m
8	13	Einar Vilhjálmsson (ISL)	78.46	75.64	78.92	78.92 m
9	18	Tom Petranoff (USA)	71.42	75.04	77.48	77.48 m
10	19	Kazuhiro Mizoguchi (JPN)	77.44	X	77.46	77.46 m
11	24	Rudolf Steiner (SUI)	76.02	67.56	X	76.02 m
12	25	Roald Bradstock (GBR)	75.96	73.66	72.60	75.96 m
13	29	Brian Crouser (USA)	72.66	72.64	72.72	72.72 m
14	30	Charlus Bertimon (FRA)	70.84	70.58	70.48	70.84 m
15	31	Mike Mahovlich (CAN)	X	69.44	67.32	69.44 m
16	32	Stéphane Laporte (FRA)	63.66	X	69.40	69.40 m
17	34	Zakayo Malekwa (TAN)	X	67.14	67.56	67.56 m
18	35	Ghanem Zaid (KUW)	62.88	63.50	65.84	65.84 m
19	37	Paul Hurlston (CAY)	X	62.34	61.78	62.34 m

=== Group B ===
Rank	Overall	Athlete	Attempts			Distance
Rank	Overall	Athlete	1	2	3	Distance
1	3	Tapio Korjus (FIN)	76.42	78.26	81.42	81.42 m
2	4	David Ottley (GBR)	80.98	—	—	80.98 m
3	5	Klaus Tafelmeier (FRG)	77.98	75.08	80.52	80.52 m
4	11	Dag Wennlund (SWE)	X	79.66	—	79.66 m
5	12	Viktor Yevsyukov (URS)	71.18	79.26	—	79.26 m
6	14	Dave Stephens (USA)	78.42	76.80	70.86	78.42 m
7	15	Silvio Warsönke (GDR)	75.88	75.78	78.22	78.22 m
8	16	Lee Uk-jong (KOR)	X	67.96	78.10	78.10 m
9	17	Detlef Michel (GDR)	73.54	77.68	77.70	77.70 m
10	20	Mick Hill (GBR)	77.20	74.98	72.98	77.20 m
11	21	Masami Yoshida (JPN)	74.76	71.38	76.90	76.90 m
12	22	Terry McHugh (IRL)	76.46	73.34	69.18	76.46 m
13	23	Pascal Lefèvre (FRA)	76.42	74.56	72.90	76.42 m
14	26	Zdeněk Nenadál (TCH)	75.56	69.78	75.34	75.56 m
15	27	Sigurður Einarsson (ISL)	69.18	72.90	75.52	75.52 m
16	28	Stephen Feraday (CAN)	68.78	66.22	73.32	73.32 m
17	33	Justin Arop (UGA)	67.54	69.10	67.68	69.10 m
18	36	Hafez El-Hussein (SYR)	63.34	63.34	63.30	63.34 m
19	38	Abdul Azim Al-Aliwat (KSA)	56.32	53.32	49.48	56.32 m

== Final ==
Rank	Athlete	Attempts						Distance
Rank	Athlete	1	2	3	4	5	6	Distance
1st place, gold medalist(s)	Tapio Korjus (FIN)	82.74	76.26	—	—	X	84.28	84.28 m
2nd place, silver medalist(s)	Jan Železný (TCH)	X	82.32	81.60	83.46	77.88	84.12	84.12 m
3rd place, bronze medalist(s)	Seppo Räty (FIN)	80.00	76.26	83.26	78.74	80.66	80.44	83.26 m
4	Klaus Tafelmeier (FRG)	80.14	78.72	78.28	X	77.76	82.72	82.72 m
5	Viktor Yevsyukov (URS)	81.42	82.32	X	80.38	81.42	79.52	82.32 m
6	Gerald Weiß (GDR)	80.66	81.30	79.94	77.26	77.80	78.28	81.30 m
7	Vladimir Ovchinnikov (URS)	76.48	76.58	79.12	X	77.32	74.64	79.12 m
8	Dag Wennlund (SWE)	76.88	75.62	78.30	X	76.60	X	78.30 m
9	Peter Borglund (SWE)	78.16	78.22	74.76				78.22 m
10	Kimmo Kinnunen (FIN)	75.62	77.78	78.04				78.04 m
11	David Ottley (GBR)	74.52	75.70	76.96				76.96 m
12	Sejad Krdžalić (YUG)	72.12	73.28	X				73.28 m

== See also ==
- 1984 Men's Olympic Javelin Throw (Los Angeles)
- 1987 Men's World Championships Javelin Throw (Rome)
- 1988 Javelin Throw Year Ranking
- 1990 Men's European Championships Javelin Throw (Split)
- 1991 Men's World Championships Javelin Throw (Tokyo)
- 1992 Men's Olympic Javelin Throw (Barcelona)
