= 1993 World Championships in Athletics – Men's javelin throw =

These are the official results of the Men's Javelin Throw event at the 1993 World Championships in Stuttgart, Germany. There were a total of 47 participating athletes, with the final held on Monday August 16, 1993. All results were made with rough surfaced javelin. The qualification mark was set at 81.00 metres.

== Doping disqualification ==
The original bronze medalist Dmitriy Polyunin (Uzbekistan) was disqualified for doping after his sample was found positive for the anabolic steroid stanozolol, and the medal was instead awarded Mick Hill (Great Britain).

== Medalists ==
Gold	Jan Železný; Czech Republic (CZE)
Silver	Kimmo Kinnunen; Finland (FIN)
Bronze	(United Kingdom) Mick Hill; Great Britain (GBR)

== Schedule ==
- All times are Central European Time (UTC+1)

Qualification Round
Group A	Group B
15.08.1993 – 10:00h	15.08.1993 – 12:00h
Final Round
16.08.1993 – 19:30h

== Abbreviations ==
- All results shown are in metres

Q	automatic qualification
q	qualification by rank
DNS	did not start
NM	no mark
WR	world record
AR	area record
NR	national record
PB	personal best
SB	season best

== Records ==
Standing records prior to the 1993 World Athletics Championships
World Record	Jan Železný (CZE)	95.54 m	April 6, 1993	Pietersburg, South Africa
Event Record	Kimmo Kinnunen (FIN)	90.82 m	August 26, 1991	Tokyo, Japan
Season Best	Raymond Hecht (GER)	88.90 m	July 2, 1993	Villeneuve d'Ascq, France
Broken records during the 1993 World Athletics Championships
Event Record	Kimmo Kinnunen (FIN)	84.78 m	August 16, 1993	Stuttgart, Germany
Event Record	Jan Železný (CZE)	85.98 m	August 16, 1993	Stuttgart, Germany

== Qualification ==
=== Group A ===
Rank	Overall	Athlete	Attempts			Distance
Rank	Overall	Athlete	1	2	3	Distance
1	1	Jan Železný (CZE)	83.22	—	—	83.22 m
2	2	Ari Pakarinen (FIN)	X	83.06	—	83.06 m
3	3	Dmitriy Polyunin (UZB)	81.04	—	—	81.04 m
4	4	Mick Hill (GBR)	79.80	80.06	80.78	80.78 m
5	7	Kimmo Kinnunen (FIN)	X	78.40	78.86	78.86 m
6	9	Patrik Bodén (SWE)	77.04	78.34	75.80	78.34 m
7	17	Kostas Gatsioudis (GRE)	76.70	75.88	X	76.70 m
8	18	Yuriy Rybin (RUS)	X	74.94	76.58	76.58 m
9	19	Ed Kaminski (USA)	69.60	74.36	75.70	75.70 m
10	20	Ivan Mustapić (CRO)	74.92	75.64	74.98	75.64 m
11	21	Colin MacKenzie (GBR)	74.10	75.34	X	75.34 m
12	22	Tom Petranoff (RSA)	75.26	X	X	75.26 m
13	24	Marek Kaleta (EST)	X	74.80	X	74.80 m
14	26	Sigurður Einarsson (ISL)	73.20	X	74.40	74.40 m
15	27	Fabio de Gaspari (ITA)	73.54	74.34	73.50	74.34 m
16	29	Peter Blank (GER)	73.76	X	74.10	74.10 m
17	31	Rodrigo Zelaya (CHI)	71.50	73.26	X	73.26 m
18	33	Dainis Kula (LAT)	69.22	73.18	X	73.18 m
19	34	Lee Wook-Jong (KOR)	72.04	X	72.02	72.04 m
20	36	Radoman Šćekić (IWP)	71.50	X	X	71.50 m
21	41	Art Skipper (USA)	67.14	X	68.72	68.72 m
22	44	Andrew Currey (AUS)	X	X	66.72	66.72 m
23	45	Edgar Baumann (PAR)	X	X	59.82	59.82 m

=== Group B ===
Rank	Overall	Athlete	Attempts			Distance
Rank	Overall	Athlete	1	2	3	Distance
1	5	Tom Pukstys (USA)	78.76	76.64	79.84	79.84 m
2	6	Steve Backley (GBR)	76.20	78.48	79.64	79.64 m
3	8	Dag Wennlund (SWE)	78.48	77.02	X	78.48 m
4	10	Terry McHugh (IRL)	75.26	78.28	X	78.28 m
5	11	Vladimir Sasimovich (BLR)	78.24	77.28	77.10	78.24 m
6	12	Miloš Steigauf (CZE)	78.10	X	X	78.10 m
7	13	Vladimir Ovchinnikov (RUS)	77.98	75.66	75.16	77.98 m
8	14	Boris Henry (GER)	76.58	73.14	77.42	77.42 m
9	15	Gavin Lovegrove (NZL)	74.16	75.14	77.08	77.08 m
10	16	Vadim Bavikin (ISR)	73.30	X	76.98	76.98 m
11	23	Raymond Hecht (GER)	71.84	X	75.00	75.00 m
12	25	Peter Borglund (SWE)	71.94	74.58	X	74.58 m
13	28	Seppo Räty (FIN)	74.30	73.62	73.16	74.30 m
14	30	Pascal Lefèvre (FRA)	73.34	X	X	73.34 m
15	32	Viktor Zaitsev (UZB)	73.22	71.64	70.54	73.22 m
16	35	Kenneth Petersen (DEN)	72.00	X	X	72.00 m
17	37	Viktor Yevsyukov (KAZ)	71.12	X	67.70	71.12 m
18	38	Vladimir Parfyonov (UZB)	X	X	70.88	70.88 m
19	39	Juan de la Garza (MEX)	70.86	X	X	70.86 m
20	40	Ambrosi Matiashvili (GEO)	69.54	X	64.74	69.54 m
21	42	Stephen Feraday (CAN)	67.74	65.76	68.40	68.40 m
22	43	Mārcis Štrobinders (LAT)	X	68.38	X	68.38 m
23	46	Ryan Haylock (CAY)	56.76	X	X	56.76 m
—	—	Phillip Spies (RSA)	X	X	X	NM

== Final ==
Rank	Athlete	Attempts						Distance	Note
Rank	Athlete	1	2	3	4	5	6	Distance	Note
1st place, gold medalist(s)	Jan Železný (CZE)	81.86	X	X	83.82	85.98	84.62	85.98 m	CR
2nd place, silver medalist(s)	Kimmo Kinnunen (FIN)	77.46	77.68	84.78	X	81.72	82.46	84.78 m	
3rd place, bronze medalist(s)	Mick Hill (GBR)	82.80	80.18	80.08	X	81.48	82.96	82.96 m	
4	Steve Backley (GBR)	79.78	81.66	79.00	81.16	80.18	81.80	81.80 m	
5	Ari Pakarinen (FIN)	81.08	76.52	X	X	X	80.44	81.08 m	
6	Dag Wennlund (SWE)	80.52	75.10	X	77.34	75.90	75.82	80.52 m	
7	Vladimir Sasimovich (BLR)	75.88	78.70	X	77.34	75.90	75.82	78.70 m	
8	Patrik Bodén (SWE)	75.18	78.00	76.84				78.00 m	
9	Tom Pukstys (USA)	75.54	75.68	77.92				77.92 m	
10	Terry McHugh (IRL)	76.06	73.38	76.22				76.22 m	
11	Miloš Steigauf (CZE)	X	X	70.78				70.78 m	
(3rd)	Dmitriy Polyunin (UZB)	75.50	80.54	83.38	X	X	81.72	DSQ	Doping

== See also ==
- 1992 Men's Olympic Javelin Throw (Barcelona)
- 1994 Men's European Championships Javelin Throw (Helsinki)
- 1996 Men's Olympic Javelin Throw (Atlanta)
