= 1994 European Athletics Championships – Men's javelin throw =

Men's javelin throw at the European Athletics Championships

These are the official results of the Men's javelin throw event at the 1994 European Championships in Helsinki, Finland, held at Helsinki Olympic Stadium on 7 and 8 August 1994. There were a total number of 26 participating athletes. The defending European Champion Steve Backley retained his title and set a championship record (85.20 metres) in the final round, using an enhanced javelin model.

== Medalists ==
Gold	(United Kingdom) Steve Backley; Great Britain (GBR)
Silver	Seppo Räty; Finland (FIN)
Bronze	Jan Železný; Czech Republic (CZE)

== Schedule ==
- All times are Eastern European Time (UTC+2)

Qualification Round
Group A	Group B
07.08.1994 – 18:50h	07.08.1994 – 20:10h
Final Round
08.08.1994 – 18:50h

== Abbreviations ==
- All results shown are in metres

Q	automatic qualification
q	qualification by rank
DNS	did not start
NM	no mark
WR	world record
AR	area record
NR	national record
PB	personal best
SB	season best

== Records ==
Standing records prior to the 1994 European Athletics Championships
World Record	Jan Železný (CZE)	95.66 m	August 28, 1993	Sheffield, United Kingdom
Event Record	Steve Backley (GBR)	87.30 m	August 28, 1990	(Socialist Federal Republic of Yugoslavia) Split, Yugoslavia
Broken records during the 1994 European Athletics Championships
Event Record	Steve Backley (GBR)	85.20 m	August 8, 1994	Helsinki, Finland

== Qualification ==
=== Group A ===
Rank	Overall	Athlete	Attempts			Distance	Note
Rank	Overall	Athlete	1	2	3	Distance	Note
1	4	Raymond Hecht (GER)	77.90	82.54	—	82.54 m	
2	6	Steve Backley (GBR)	81.58	—	—	81.58 m	
3	8	Donald Sild (EST)	81.12	—	—	81.12 m	
4	9	Patrik Bodén (SWE)	X	79.60	80.94	80.94 m	
5	12	Uladzimir Sasimovich (BLR)	78.98	75.94	X	78.98 m	
6	13	Harri Hakkarainen (FIN)	76.82	78.82	75.88	78.82 m	
7	14	Konstadinos Gatsioudis (GRE)	75.84	77.72	78.56	78.56 m	
8	15	Andrey Shevchuk (RUS)	78.56	X	72.00	78.56 m	
9	16	Sigurður Einarsson (ISL)	76.06	72.32	77.22	77.22 m	
10	22	Colin Mackenzie (GBR)	74.00	X	X	74.00 m	
11	23	Miloš Steigauf (TCH)	73.82	73.10	X	73.82 m	
12	24	Ivan Mustapić (CRO)	72.50	X	71.48	72.50 m	
13	25	Håvard Johansen (NOR)	72.44	66.40	X	72.44 m	

=== Group B ===
Rank	Overall	Athlete	Attempts			Distance	Note
Rank	Overall	Athlete	1	2	3	Distance	Note
1	1	Seppo Räty (FIN)	84.76	—	—	84.76 m	
2	2	Mick Hill (GBR)	78.24	84.44	—	84.44 m	
3	3	Jan Železný (CZE)	79.86	83.88	—	83.88 m	
4	5	Terry McHugh (IRL)	78.98	82.14	—	82.14 m	PB
5	6	Andrey Moruyev (RUS)	81.58	—	—	81.58 m	
6	10	Dag Wennlund (SWE)	79.44	80.30	—	80.30 m	
7	11	Boris Henry (GER)	79.22	77.20	76.64	79.22 m	
8	17	Yuriy Rybin (RUS)	74.26	76.38	X	76.38 m	
9	18	Juha Laukkanen (FIN)	73.54	73.82	75.86	75.86 m	
10	19	Mirosław Witek (POL)	72.56	75.26	74.58	75.26 m	
11	20	Peter Blank (GER)	74.88	72.14	X	74.88 m	
12	21	Marek Kaleta (EST)	74.46	72.32	69.74	74.46 m	
13	26	Mārcis Štrobinders (LAT)	—	—	—	NM	

== Final ==
Rank	Athlete	Attempts						Distance	Note
Rank	Athlete	1	2	3	4	5	6	Distance	Note
1st place, gold medalist(s)	Steve Backley (GBR)	81.04	85.20	81.74	X	—	79.70	85.20 m	CR
2nd place, silver medalist(s)	Seppo Räty (FIN)	81.80	X	80.06	82.16	82.90	80.78	82.90 m	
3rd place, bronze medalist(s)	Jan Železný (CZE)	80.40	82.58	82.50	X	X	X	82.58 m	
4	Patrik Bodén (SWE)	79.54	80.80	80.76	79.14	81.34	75.66	81.34 m	
5	Raymond Hecht (GER)	79.12	78.04	81.18	X	80.60	81.06	81.18 m	
6	Mick Hill (GBR)	80.24	80.36	80.66	X	X	X	80.66 m	
7	Terry McHugh (IRL)	79.12	78.30	79.78	75.52	80.46	X	80.46 m	
8	Uladzimir Sasimovich (BLR)	78.88	X	77.32	75.42	X	76.52	78.88 m	
9	Andrey Moruyev (RUS)	X	X	78.66				78.66 m	
10	Dag Wennlund (SWE)	78.52	77.60	75.16				78.52 m	
11	Boris Henry (GER)	76.40	74.10	76.88				76.88 m	
12	Donald Sild (EST)	75.38	71.16	74.88				75.38 m	

== Participation ==
According to an unofficial count, 26 athletes from 15 countries participated in the event.

- Belarus (1)
- Croatia (1)
- Czech Republic (2)
- Estonia (2)
- Finland (3)
- Germany (3)
- Greece (1)
- Iceland (1)
- Ireland (1)
- Latvia (1)
- Norway (1)
- Poland (1)
- Russia (3)
- Sweden (2)
- United Kingdom (3)

== See also ==
- 1991 Men's World Championships Javelin Throw (Tokyo)
- 1992 Men's Olympic Javelin Throw (Barcelona)
- 1993 Men's World Championships Javelin Throw (Stuttgart)
- 1995 Men's World Championships Javelin Throw (Gothenburg)
- 1996 Men's Olympic Javelin Throw (Atlanta)
- 1997 Men's World Championships Javelin Throw (Athens)
