= 1987 World Championships in Athletics – Men's javelin throw =

These are the official results of the Men's Javelin Throw event at the 1987 World Championships in Rome, Italy. There were a total of 37 participating athletes, with the final held on Sunday August 30, 1987. All results were made with rough surfaced javelin (old design). The qualification mark was set at 79.00 metres.

== Medalists ==
Gold	Seppo Räty; Finland (FIN)
Silver	Viktor Yevsyukov; Soviet Union (URS)
Bronze	Jan Železný; Czechoslovakia (TCH)

== Schedule ==
- All times are Central European Time (UTC+1)

Qualification Round
Group A	Group B
29.08.1987 – 18:00h	29.08.1987 – 19:00h
Final Round
30.08.1987 – 17:30h

== Abbreviations ==
- All results shown are in metres

Q	automatic qualification
q	qualification by rank
DNS	did not start
NM	no mark
WR	world record
AR	area record
NR	national record
PB	personal best
SB	season best

== Records ==
Standing records prior to the 1987 World Athletics Championships
World Record	Jan Železný (TCH)	87.66 m	May 31, 1987	Nitra, Czechoslovakia
Event Record	New javelin design since last championships			
Season Best	Jan Železný (TCH)	87.66 m	May 31, 1987	Nitra, Czechoslovakia
Broken records during the 1987 World Athletics Championships
Event Record	Viktor Yevsyukov (URS)	82.10 m	August 29, 1987	Rome, Italy
Event Record	Jan Železný (TCH)	82.20 m	August 30, 1987	Rome, Italy
Event Record	Seppo Räty (FIN)	82.32 m	August 30, 1987	Rome, Italy
Event Record	Viktor Yevsyukov (URS)	82.52 m	August 30, 1987	Rome, Italy
Event Record	Seppo Räty (FIN)	83.54 m	August 30, 1987	Rome, Italy

== Qualification ==
=== Group A ===
Rank	Overall	Athlete	Attempts			Distance
Rank	Overall	Athlete	1	2	3	Distance
1	1	Viktor Yevsyukov (URS)	77.30	73.90	81.36	81.36 m
2	3	Pascal Lefèvre (FRA)	76.30	80.60	—	80.60 m
3	5	Jan Železný (TCH)	70.86	79.20	—	79.20 m
4	6	Duncan Atwood (USA)	78.92	76.62	—	78.92 m
5	7	Mick Hill (GBR)	77.98	78.88	77.42	78.88 m
6	9	Peter Borglund (SWE)	78.30	75.76	76.62	78.30 m
7	10	Seppo Räty (FIN)	78.22	76.50	77.58	78.22 m
8	14	Antonios Papadimitriou (GRE)	70.12	X	76.48	76.48 m
9	17	Sejad Krdžalić (YUG)	70.02	X	75.94	75.94 m
10	18	Roald Bradstock (GBR)	71.28	75.86	73.90	75.86 m
11	21	Emil Tsvetanov (BUL)	73.88	75.48	72.24	75.48 m
12	22	Masami Yoshida (JPN)	72.48	74.90	73.34	74.90 m
13	25	Juan de la Garza (MEX)	73.36	71.56	68.56	73.36 m
14	27	Andreas Linden (FRG)	72.22	71.48	71.80	72.22 m
15	28	Kim Jae-Sang (KOR)	71.88	66.60	68.06	71.88 m
16	30	Zakayo Malekwa (TAN)	71.74	68.50	70.30	71.74 m
17	35	Tarek Chaabani (TUN)	61.86	64.32	64.66	64.66 m
18	36	Bassam Al-Shater (SYR)	X	59.56	61.64	61.64 m
19	37	Romeo Montanes (PHI)	54.62	57.18	58.38	58.38 m

=== Group B ===
Rank	Overall	Athlete	Attempts			Distance
Rank	Overall	Athlete	1	2	3	Distance
1	2	Tom Petranoff (USA)	81.26	—	—	81.26 m
2	4	Kazuhiro Mizoguchi (JPN)	71.62	80.58	—	80.58 m
3	8	David Ottley (GBR)	72.40	78.64	70.42	78.64 m
4	11	Lev Shatilo (URS)	73.44	73.42	78.20	78.20 m
5	12	Dag Wennlund (SWE)	77.78	75.80	76.64	77.78 m
6	13	Einar Vilhjálmsson (ISL)	74.98	75.54	77.46	77.46 m
7	15	Klaus Tafelmeier (FRG)	75.94	74.78	76.46	76.46 m
8	16	Marek Kaleta (URS)	72.28	76.10	73.26	76.10 m
9	19	Jyrki Blom (FIN)	75.64	75.74	68.10	75.74 m
10	20	Sigurður Einarsson (ISL)	75.52	73.54	X	75.52 m
11	23	Gavin Lovegrove (NZL)	74.16	X	X	74.16 m
12	24	Mirosław Witek (POL)	69.82	73.26	73.62	73.62 m
13	26	Ivan Mustapić (YUG)	71.00	73.34	70.02	72.34 m
14	29	Justin Arop (UGA)	67.08	68.36	71.76	71.76 m
15	31	Mark Babich (USA)	67.94	70.76	70.62	70.76 m
16	32	Fabio de Gaspari (ITA)	70.44	70.76	65.84	70.76 m
17	33	Zdeněk Adamec (TCH)	X	X	70.72	70.72 m
18	34	Mike Mahovlich (CAN)	67.64	65.92	66.20	67.64 m

== Final ==
Rank	Athlete	Attempts						Distance	Note
Rank	Athlete	1	2	3	4	5	6	Distance	Note
1st place, gold medalist(s)	Seppo Räty (FIN)	79.86	78.08	82.32	76.52	79.44	83.54	83.54 m	
2nd place, silver medalist(s)	Viktor Yevsyukov (URS)	82.10	80.36	X	X	82.52	80.34	82.52 m	
3rd place, bronze medalist(s)	Jan Železný (TCH)	80.56	82.20	79.50	X	79.38	X	82.20 m	
4	Tom Petranoff (USA)	75.48	80.46	81.28	X	80.76	X	81.28 m	
5	Lev Shatilo (URS)	69.84	81.02	76.84	71.42	X	X	81.02 m	
6	Kazuhiro Mizoguchi (JPN)	80.24	X	77.98	77.26	77.28	77.72	80.24 m	
7	Mick Hill (GBR)	78.14	79.66	74.72	X	74.64	75.52	79.66 m	
8	Dag Wennlund (SWE)	72.52	75.68	78.40	76.76	X	77.48	78.40 m	
9	David Ottley (GBR)	74.48	76.78	77.64				77.64 m	
10	Pascal Lefèvre (FRA)	75.94	75.62	77.14				77.14 m	
11	Peter Borglund (SWE)	75.22	74.98	75.46				75.46 m	
12	Duncan Atwood (USA)	67.86	72.54	X				72.54 m	

== See also ==
- 1984 Men's Olympic Javelin Throw (Los Angeles)
- 1986 Men's European Championships Javelin Throw (Stuttgart)
- 1988 Men's Olympic Javelin Throw (Seoul)
- 1990 Men's European Championships Javelin Throw (Split)
