= 1991 World Championships in Athletics – Men's javelin throw =

These are the official results of the Men's Javelin Throw event at the 1991 World Championships in Tokyo, Japan. There were a total of 41 participating athletes, with the final held on Monday August 26, 1991. All results were made with rough surfaced javelin. The qualification mark was set at 82.00 metres.

== Medalists ==
Gold	Kimmo Kinnunen; Finland (FIN)
Silver	Seppo Räty; Finland (FIN)
Bronze	Vladimir Sasimovich; Soviet Union (URS)

== Schedule ==
- All times are Japan Standard Time (UTC+9)

Qualification Round
Group A	Group B
25.08.1991 – 09:00h	25.08.1991 – 10:30h
Final Round
26.08.1991 – 18:10h

== Abbreviations ==
- All results shown are in metres

Q	automatic qualification
q	qualification by rank
DNS	did not start
NM	no mark
WR	world record
AR	area record
NR	national record
PB	personal best
SB	season best

== Records ==
Standing records prior to the 1991 World Athletics Championships
World Record	Seppo Räty (FIN)	96.96 m	June 2, 1991	Punkalaidun, Finland
Event Record	Seppo Räty (FIN)	83.54 m	August 30, 1987	Rome, Italy
Season Best	Tom Petranoff (USA)	89.16 m	March 1, 1991	Potchefstroom, South Africa
Broken records during the 1991 World Athletics Championships
Event Record	Kimmo Kinnunen (FIN)	90.82 m	August 26, 1991	Tokyo, Japan

== Qualification ==
=== Group A ===
Rank	Overall	Athlete	Attempts			Distance
Rank	Overall	Athlete	1	2	3	Distance
1	1	Kimmo Kinnunen (FIN)	80.68	88.48	—	88.48 m
2	6	Gavin Lovegrove (NZL)	74.54	76.46	82.08	82.08 m
3	10	Einar Vilhjálmsson (ISL)	80.10	79.64	78.56	80.10 m
4	14	Dmitriy Polyunin (URS)	78.50	78.08	77.84	78.50 m
5	15	Steve Backley (GBR)	75.34	78.24	73.96	78.24 m
6	16	Ramón González (CUB)	77.00	77.72	72.54	77.72 m
7	17	Pascal Lefévre (FRA)	X	77.26	76.84	77.26 m
8	18	Jan Železný (TCH)	X	76.26	X	76.26 m
9	19	Ari Pakarinen (FIN)	75.08	67.82	76.14	76.14 m
10	22	Masami Yoshida (JPN)	X	X	75.96	75.96 m
11	24	Dave Stephens (USA)	75.10	71.10	72.80	75.10 m
12	27	Peter Borglund (SWE)	67.84	74.40	68.00	74.40 m
13	28	Sejad Krdžalić (YUG)	67.92	X	73.84	73.84 m
14	31	Juan de la Garza (MEX)	72.84	66.34	66.18	72.84 m
15	32	Viktor Zaitsev (URS)	X	72.48	69.82	72.48 m
16	33	Klaus Tafelmeier (GER)	X	X	72.42	72.42 m
17	34	Rodrigo Zelaya (CHI)	68.76	70.70	62.38	70.70 m
18	36	Angel Mandzhukov (BUL)	66.26	69.78	X	69.78 m
19	39	Julián Sotelo (ESP)	X	X	65.74	65.74 m
20	40	Trevor Modeste (GRN)	62.68	60.28	X	62.68 m

=== Group B ===
Rank	Overall	Athlete	Attempts			Distance
Rank	Overall	Athlete	1	2	3	Distance
1	2	Seppo Räty (FIN)	80.50	87.34	—	87.34 m
2	3	Peter Blank (GER)	82.56	—	—	82.56 m
3	4	Dag Wennlund (SWE)	82.46	—	—	82.46 m
4	5	Vladimir Sasimovich (URS)	82.38	—	—	82.38 m
5	7	Raymond Hecht (GER)	77.80	78.48	81.92	81.92 m
6	8	Vadim Bavikin (ISR)	78.68	81.56	X	81.56 m
7	9	Sigurður Einarsson (ISL)	78.02	78.84	80.60	80.60 m
8	11	Patrik Bodén (SWE)	79.64	77.84	79.22	79.64 m
9	12	Mick Hill (GBR)	79.54	X	X	79.54 m
10	13	Zhang Lianbiao (CHN)	76.28	71.60	78.94	78.94 m
11	20	Radoman Šćekić (YUG)	76.10	X	X	76.10 m
12	21	Sigurdur Matthiasson (ISL)	76.02	73.64	71.40	76.02 m
13	23	Colin MacKenzie (GBR)	75.12	X	74.74	75.12 m
14	25	Mike Barnett (USA)	71.02	72.44	75.02	75.02 m
15	26	Tom Pukstys (USA)	74.72	X	X	74.72 m
16	29	Kazuhiro Mizoguchi (JPN)	73.78	X	73.42	73.78 m
17	30	Kim Ki-Hun (KOR)	73.62	69.22	70.94	73.62 m
18	35	Luis Lucumi (COL)	69.64	70.48	66.44	70.48 m
19	37	Frederick Morgan (ASA)	66.98	X	65.52	66.98 m
20	38	Frans Mahuse (INA)	66.20	63.56	—	66.20 m
21	41	Benjamin Cawicaan (PHI)	59.56	58.54	61.38	61.38 m

== Final ==
Rank	Athlete	Attempts						Distance	Note
Rank	Athlete	1	2	3	4	5	6	Distance	Note
1st place, gold medalist(s)	Kimmo Kinnunen (FIN)	90.82	—	X	82.12	82.74	X	90.82 m	
2nd place, silver medalist(s)	Seppo Räty (FIN)	81.04	81.22	84.14	X	X	88.12	88.12 m	
3rd place, bronze medalist(s)	Vladimir Sasimovich (URS)	X	87.08	X	X	X	X	87.08 m	
4	Gavin Lovegrove (NZL)	76.16	75.54	82.30	82.02	X	84.24	84.24 m	
5	Mick Hill (GBR)	84.12	X	X	X	76.44	79.94	84.12 m	
6	Sigurður Einarsson (ISL)	75.76	82.00	83.46	X	81.54	82.60	83.46 m	
7	Dag Wennlund (SWE)	X	74.26	81.14	75.56	78.02	X	81.14 m	
8	Patrik Bodén (SWE)	74.16	X	78.12	X	73.62	78.58	78.58 m	
9	Einar Vilhjálmsson (ISL)	77.28	X	X				77.28 m	
10	Vadim Bavikin (ISR)	77.18	X	68.98				77.18 m	
11	Peter Blank (GER)	68.04	72.62	66.92				72.62 m	
12	Raymond Hecht (GER)	66.46	70.58	X				70.58 m	

== See also ==
- 1988 Men's Olympic Javelin Throw (Seoul)
- 1990 Men's European Championships Javelin Throw (Split)
- 1992 Men's Olympic Javelin Throw (Barcelona)
- 1994 Men's European Championships Javelin Throw (Helsinki)
