= 1990 European Athletics Championships – Men's javelin throw =

Men's javelin throw at the European Athletics Championships

These are the official results of the Men's Javelin Throw event at the 1990 European Championships in Split, Yugoslavia, held at Stadion Poljud on 27 and 28 August 1990. The qualification mark was set at 80.00 metres.

== Medalists ==
Gold	(United Kingdom) Steve Backley; Great Britain (GBR)
Silver	Viktor Zaitsev; Soviet Union (URS)
Bronze	Patrik Bodén; Sweden (SWE)

== Schedule ==
- All times are Central European Time (UTC+1)

Qualification Round
Group A	Group B
27.08.1990 – 17:30h	27.08.1990 – 19:00h
Final Round
28.08.1990 – 18:10h

== Abbreviations ==
- All results shown are in metres

Q	automatic qualification
q	qualification by rank
DNS	did not start
NM	no mark
WR	world record
AR	area record
NR	national record
PB	personal best
SB	season best

== Records ==
Standing records prior to the 1990 European Athletics Championships
World Record	Steve Backley (GBR)	90.98 m	July 20, 1990	London, United Kingdom
Event Record	Klaus Tafelmeier (FRG)	84.76 m	August 27, 1986	Stuttgart, West Germany

== Qualification ==
=== Group A ===
Rank	Overall	Athlete	Attempts			Distance
Rank	Overall	Athlete	1	2	3	Distance
1	4	Viktor Zaitsev (URS)	81.00	—	—	81.00 m
2	5	Vladimir Ovchinnikov (URS)	79.94	—	X	79.94 m
3	7	Seppo Räty (FIN)	79.50	77.90	76.78	79.50 m
4	9	Kimmo Kinnunen (FIN)	76.50	78.26	79.04	79.04 m
5	11	Raymond Hecht (GDR)	78.24	X	68.82	78.24 m
6	12	Johan van Lieshout (NED)	77.82	X	X	77.82 m
7	13	Jan Železný (TCH)	X	77.64	76.38	77.64 m
8	16	Dag Wennlund (SWE)	76.58	75.76	77.32	77.32 m
9	17	Sigurður Einarsson (ISL)	75.20	75.86	77.32	77.32 m
10	20	Marko Hyytiäinen (FIN)	74.66	X	75.88	75.88 m
11	21	Ivan Mustapić (YUG)	71.44	73.62	75.04	75.04 m
12	23	Peter Schreiber (FRG)	73.54	X	74.08	74.08 m
13	25	Peter Blank (FRG)	73.30	70.32	X	73.30 m
14	28	Gary Jenson (GBR)	64.46	64.82	71.60	71.60 m
15	29	Fikret Özsoy (TUR)	61.96	67.20	68.86	68.86 m

=== Group B ===
Rank	Overall	Athlete	Attempts			Distance
Rank	Overall	Athlete	1	2	3	Distance
1	1	Einar Vilhjálmsson (ISL)	85.48	—	—	85.48 m
2	2	Steve Backley (GBR)	82.24	—	—	82.24 m
3	3	Patrik Bodén (SWE)	81.36	—	—	81.36 m
4	6	Klaus Tafelmeier (FRG)	74.70	74.08	79.84	79.84 m
5	8	Mick Hill (GBR)	77.94	79.16	X	79.16 m
6	10	Pascal Lefèvre (FRA)	76.12	78.68	73.32	78.68 m
7	14	Marek Kaleta (URS)	68.88	70.26	77.64	77.64 m
8	15	Peter Borglund (SWE)	70.02	73.26	77.46	77.46 m
9	18	Sejad Krdžalić (YUG)	77.28	75.22	70.88	77.28 m
10	19	Terry McHugh (IRL)	76.14	74.52	71.50	76.14 m
11	22	Dumitru Negoiţă (ROM)	73.82	74.36	71.68	74.36 m
12	24	Radoman Šćekić (YUG)	X	72.48	73.34	73.34 m
13	26	Rudolf Steiner (SUI)	61.06	X	73.12	73.12 m
14	27	Sigurður Matthíasson (ISL)	71.14	71.66	72.52	72.52 m
15	30	Jeroen van der Meer (NED)	X	65.60	67.76	67.76 m

== Final ==
Rank	Athlete	Attempts						Distance
Rank	Athlete	1	2	3	4	5	6	Distance
1st place, gold medalist(s)	Steve Backley (GBR)	85.78	83.80	X	82.16	X	87.30	87.30 m
2nd place, silver medalist(s)	Viktor Zaytsev (URS)	83.30	79.24	79.36	74.62	82.54	76.50	83.30 m
3rd place, bronze medalist(s)	Patrik Bodén (SWE)	77.46	80.36	82.66	81.84	81.96	81.78	82.66 m
4	Mick Hill (GBR)	79.10	82.38	78.02	80.82	80.78	X	82.38 m
5	Seppo Räty (FIN)	76.80	79.54	X	80.62	81.60	82.18	82.18 m
6	Vladimir Ovchinnikov (URS)	78.32	81.78	78.36	76.56	—	X	81.78 m
7	Pascal Lefèvre (FRA)	79.68	73.74	77.18	79.98	76.00	X	79.98 m
8	Kimmo Kinnunen (FIN)	78.28	77.94	75.48	X	X	79.00	79.00 m
9	Einar Vilhjálmsson (ISL)	73.92	77.80	78.14				78.14 m
10	Raymond Hecht (GDR)	77.72	66.54	69.34				77.72 m
11	Klaus Tafelmeier (FRG)	77.24	70.44	77.26				77.26 m
12	Johan van Lieshout (NED)	75.52	X	74.68				75.52 m

== Participation ==
According to an unofficial count, 30 athletes from 15 countries participated in the event.

- Czechoslovakia (1)
- East Germany (1)
- Finland (3)
- France (1)
- Iceland (3)
- Ireland (1)
- Netherlands (2)
- Romania (1)
- Soviet Union (3)
- Sweden (3)
- Switzerland (1)
- Turkey (1)
- United Kingdom (3)
- West Germany (3)
- Yugoslavia (3)

== See also ==
- 1988 Men's Olympic Javelin Throw (Seoul)
- 1991 Men's World Championships Javelin Throw (Tokyo)
- 1992 Men's Olympic Javelin Throw (Barcelona)
