= John Stapylton-Smith =

New Zealand javelin thrower

John Martin Stapylton-Smith (born 12 August 1961) is a retired New Zealand javelin thrower.

He won the 1985 Pacific Conference Games, finished fifth at the 1985 World Cup, ninth at the 1986 Commonwealth Games seventh at the 1989 World Cup, seventh at the 1990 Commonwealth Games, and again seventh at the 1992 World Cup,

Stapylton-Smith became New Zealand champion 1984, 1985, 1986 and 1989. His main competitors were Gavin Lovegrove and Mike O'Rourke. His personal best throw was 87.28 metres with the old javelin type, achieved in June 1985 in Berkeley; and 78.14 metres with the new javelin type, achieved in February 1989 in Hamilton, New Zealand.

In 1990, Stapylton-Smith was awarded the New Zealand 1990 Commemoration Medal.
