= Korjus =

Family name

Origin
- Languages: Estonian, Finnish
- Region of origin: Estonia, Finland

Korjus is a surname originating in Estonia and Finland (in Estonian, it means "carrion"). It's bearers include:

- Jaakko Korjus (1926–1998), Finnish writer and editor
- Kevin Korjus (born 1993), Estonian racing driver
- Miliza Korjus (1909–1980), American opera singer and actress of Estonian descent
- Seppo Korjus (born 1942), Finnish actor and musician
- Tapio Korjus (born 1961), Finnish javelin thrower
- Vesa Korjus (born 1981), Finnish hurdler
