= Mahovlich =

Mahovlich is a surname. Notable people with the surname include:

- Frank Mahovlich (born 1938), Canadian ice hockey player and politician, brother of Peter
- Mike Mahovlich (born 1960), Canadian javelin thrower
- Peter Mahovlich (born 1946), Canadian ice hockey player, coach, and executive
