= Jónas Egilsson =

Icelandic athlete and sports executive

President of the Icelandic Athletic Federation
- In office July 1997 – March 2006
- Preceded by: Helgi Haraldsson
- Succeeded by: Arnþór Sigurðsson

Jónas Egilsson

President of the Icelandic Athletic Federation
- In office March 2012 – 7 September 2014
- Preceded by: Stefán Halldórsson
- Succeeded by: Einar Vilhjálmsson

Jónas Egilsson (born 12 February 1958) is an Icelandic athlete and sports executive.

== Athletics career ==
In the 80s he ran sprints at distances of 100 to 400 m as well as 400 m hurdles. He represented the club Íþróttafélag Reykjavíkur.

== Executive career ==
Jónas was a long-term president of the Icelandic Athletic Federation (Frjálsíþróttasamband Íslands). He first became president in July 1997 and served this function until March 2006. For the second time he was elected president in March 2012. In September 2014 he was replaced by Einar Vilhjálmsson. In 2003–2007 and again from 2011 he was a member of the European Athletics Council.
