= Andrey Moruyev =

Russian javelin thrower

Andrey Moruyev (Russian: Андрей Моруев; born 6 May 1970 in Petrozavodsk, Republic of Karelia) is a retired male javelin thrower from Russia. He set his personal best (87.34 metres) on 25 June 1994 in Birmingham.

== International competitions ==
Year	Competition	Venue	Position	Notes
Representing Russia
1994	European Championships	Helsinki, Finland	9th	78.66 m
1995	World Championships	Gothenburg, Sweden	10th	79.14 m
1996	Olympic Games	Atlanta, United States	22nd	77.20 m
1997	World Championships	Athens, Greece	11th	81.38 m
