= Rudolf Steiner (disambiguation) =

Rudolf Steiner (1861–1925) was an Austrian philosopher and polymath.

Rudolf Steiner may also refer to:

- Rudolf Steiner (footballer, born 1903) (1903–1994), Romanian footballer
- Rudolf Steiner (footballer, born 1937) (1937–2015), German footballer
- Rudolf Steiner (film director) (born 1942), German film director
- Rudolf Steiner (athlete) (born 1951), Swiss track and field athlete
