= Einar Vilhjálmsson =

Icelandic javelin thrower

President of the Icelandic Athletic Federation
- In office 7 September 2014 – 1 May 2016
- Preceded by: Jónas Egilsson
- Succeeded by: Freyr Ólafsson

Personal details
- Born: 1 June 1960 (age 66) Reykjavík, Iceland

Einar Vilhjálmsson (born 1 June 1960 in Reykjavík) is a retired male javelin thrower from Iceland, who represented his native country at three consecutive Summer Olympics, starting in 1984. He set his personal best (86.80 metres) on 30 August 1992 in his native town Reykjavík. His father Vilhjálmur Einarsson finished in second place in the men's triple jump at the 1956 Summer Olympics.

In September 2014, he was elected president of the Icelandic Athletic Federation (Frjálsíþróttasamband Íslands).

== Achievements ==
Year	Competition	Venue	Position	Notes
Representing Iceland
1984	Olympic Games	Los Angeles, United States	6th	81.58 m
1987	World Championships	Rome, Italy	13th	77.46 m
1988	Olympic Games	Seoul, South Korea	13th	78.92 m
1990	European Championships	Split, Yugoslavia	9th	78.14 m
1991	World Championships	Tokyo, Japan	9th	77.28 m
1992	Olympic Games	Barcelona, Spain	14th	78.70 m
