= Roberto Bertolini =

Italian javelin thrower (born 1985)

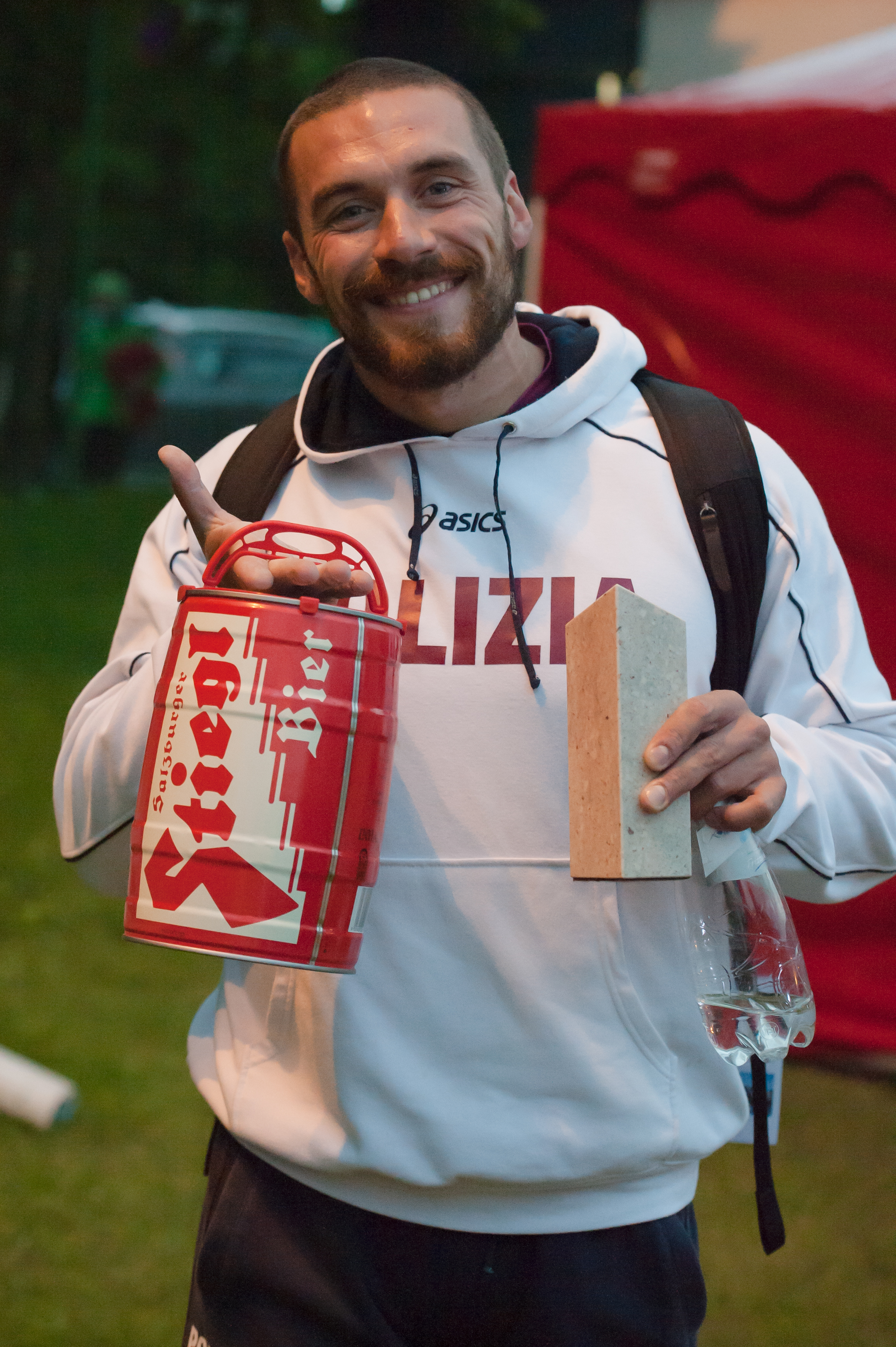
- Bertolini in 2015

Personal information
- Nationality: Italian
- Born: 10 September 1985 (age 40) Milan, Italy
- Height: 1.87 m (6 ft 1 1/2 in)
- Weight: 100 kg (220 lb)

Sport
- Country: Italy
- Sport: Athletics
- Event: Javelin throw
- Club: G.S. Fiamme Oro
- Coached by: Cosimo Scaglione

Achievements and titles
- Personal best: Javelin throw: 81.68 m (2017)
Medal record
Mediterranean Games
Silver medal – second place	2018 Tarragona	Javelinn throw

Roberto Bertolini (born 10 September 1985) is a javelin thrower from Italy.

He won the javelin throwing competition in the Italian Athletics Championships of 2008, 2009, 2010, and 2015, and has represented his country many times internationally. He is now a javelin throw coach in Italy.

== Life ==
Bertolini won a total of four national titles during his career. He set his personal best (81.05 metres) on 18 June 2016 in Nembro and this is the third italian best performance of all-time. He has 5 caps in national team.

== Career ==
Personal best

Year	Time	Venue	Date	World Rank	Note
2019	77.85 m	(Italy) Lucca	24 February	5th	
2018	80.24 m	(Italy) Trieste	14 July		
2017	81.68 m	(Italy) Nembro	7 July		
2016	81.05 m	(Italy) Nembro	18 June		
2015	80.97 m	(Switzerland) Genève	6 June		
2014	77.23 m	(Italy) Milan	27 September		
2013	74.58 m	(Italy) Ascoli Piceno	27 April		
2012	74.35 m	(Italy) Modena	22 September		
2011	74.44 m	(Italy) Milan	18 September		
2009	74.48 m	(Italy) Savona	27 May		
2008	78.10 m	(Italy) Nembro	24 July		

== Achievements ==
Year	Competition	Venue	Position	Event	Measure	Notes
2008	European Cup	(France) Annecy	4th	Javelin throw	74.55 m	
2009	Mediterranean Games	(Italy) Pescara	9th	Javelin throw	70.16 m	
2011	European Team Championships	(Sweden) Stockholm	6th	Javelin throw	72.07 m	SB
2016	European Championships	(Netherlands) Amsterdam	6th	Javelin throw	75.75 m	

== National titles ==
Roberto Bertolini has won 4 times for the individual national championships.

- 4 wins in javelin throw (2008, 2009, 2010 and 2015)

== See also ==
- Italian all-time lists - Javelin throw
