= Terry McHugh =

Irish javelin thrower

Personal information
- Born: 22 August 1963 (age 62) Clonmel, Ireland
- Height: 1.93 m (6 ft 4 in)
- Weight: 104 kg (229 lb)

Sport
- Country: Ireland
- Sport: Athletics
- Event: Javelin throw

Achievements and titles
- Personal bests: NR 82.75 m (2000)

Terry McHugh (born 22 August 1963) is a retired Irish track and field athlete who competed in the javelin throw. His personal best of 82.75 m, set in 2000, is the Irish record. He won twenty-one consecutive Irish Championships from 1984 to 2004.

== Career ==
During his career, McHugh finished tenth at the 1993 World Championships and seventh at the 1994 European Championships. He competed in four Summer Olympics – 1988 (22nd), 1992 (27th), 1996 (29th) and 2000 (20th).

McHugh also competed in two Winter Olympics – 1992 Albertville (32nd in Bobsleigh Men's Two) and 1998 Nagano (27th in Bobsleigh Men's Two & 30th in Bobsleigh Men's Four).

He is the second Irish sportsperson, after sailor David Wilkins, to compete at five Olympics, and the first to compete at six.

== Personal life ==
McHugh has remained close friends with his bobsleigh teammate and former champion discus thrower Garry Power, who now teaches at a school in the UK. McHugh lives in Switzerland with his wife Daniela (former Swiss 400m runner) and son. He returned to Ireland in 2009 for the burial of Power's father, for whom he was a pall-bearer.

== Competition record ==
Year	Competition	Venue	Position	Notes
Representing Ireland
1988	Olympic Games	Seoul, South Korea	22nd	76.46 m
1990	European Championships	Split, Yugoslavia	19th (q)	76.14 m
1992	Olympic Games	Barcelona, Spain	27th	73.26 m
1993	World Championships	Stuttgart, Germany	10th	76.22 m
1994	European Championships	Helsinki, Finland	7th	80.46 m
1995	World Championships	Gothenburg, Sweden	21st	74.58 m
1996	Olympic Games	Atlanta, Georgia, United States	29th	72.84 m
1997	World Championships	Athens, Greece	14th	77.90 m
1998	European Championships	Budapest, Hungary	23rd	72.82 m
1999	World Championships	Seville, Spain	20th	77.23 m
2000	Olympic Games	Sydney, Australia	20th	79.90 m
2001	World Championships	Edmonton, Canada	24th	75.49 m
2002	European Championships	Munich, Germany	—	NM

== Seasonal bests by year ==
- 1988 - 76.46
- 1992 - 73.26
- 1993 - 78.28
- 1994 - 82.14
- 1995 - 74.58
- 1996 - 72.84
- 1997 - 77.90
- 1998 - 79.73
- 1999 - 78.47
- 2000 - 82.75 NR
- 2001 - 78.19
- 2002 - 78.67
- 2003 - 72.14
- 2004 - 75.57
