= Lev Shatilo =

Lev Vladimirovich Shatilo (Russian: Лев Владимирович Шатило; born 21 October 1962) is a Russian former javelin thrower for the Soviet Union, who is best known for finishing fifth (81.02 metres) at the 1987 World Championships in Rome, Italy. In 1992 he was the first national champion of Russia since independence.

He also placed third in the javelin at the 1992 CIS Winter Throwing Championships. His personal best for the event was 84.30 m (276 ft 6 3/4 in), set on 7 June 1987 in Moscow.

== International competitions ==
| Year | Competition | Venue | Position | Notes |
Representing Soviet Union
| 1987 | World Championships | Rome, Italy | 5th | 81.02 m |

== National titles ==
- Russian Athletics Championships
  - Javelin throw: 1992

== See also ==
- List of javelin throw national champions (men)
