= Armin Kerer =

Italian javelin thrower

Personal information
- Nationality: Italian
- Born: 27 June 1972 (age 54) Brixen, Italy

Sport
- Country: Italy
- Sport: Athletics
- Event: Javelin throw
- Club: G.S. Fiamme Gialle

Achievements and titles
- Personal best: Javelin throw: 80.25 m (1989)

Armin Kerer (born 27 June 1972) is a retired Italian javelin thrower. His most notable victories were national titles in 1998 and 2000, but his personal best performance was achieved in Brixen on 18 September 1999, when he threw 80.25 metres. He represented the sports club SSV Brixen.

== National titles ==
Armin Kerer has won 3 times the individual national championship.

- 2 wins in Javelin throw (1998, 2000)
- 1 win in Javelin throw (1996) at the Italian Winter Throwing Championships

== See also ==
- Italian all-time lists - Javelin throw
