= Rodrigo Zelaya =

Chilean javelin thrower (born 1968)

Personal information
- Born: 12 June 1968 (age 57)

Sport
- Sport: Track and field

Rodrigo Andrés Zelaya Pérez (born 12 June 1968) is a retired Chilean athlete who specialised in the javelin throw. He twice represented his country at World Championships, in 1991 and 1993, without qualifying for the final. In addition, he won multiple medals on regional level.

Zelaya competed for the Texas Tech Red Raiders track and field team in the NCAA.

His personal best of 77.28 metres (Santiago de Chile 1998) is a former national record.

== Competition record ==
Year	Competition	Venue	Position	Notes
Representing Chile
1987	South American Junior Championships	Santiago, Chile	2nd	62.98 m
1987	South American Championships	São Paulo, Brazil	2nd	64.06 m
1988	Ibero-American Championships	Mexico City, Mexico	6th	62.88 m A
1989	South American Championships	Medellín, Colombia	5th	62.66 m
1990	Ibero-American Championships	Manaus, Brazil	3rd	67.28 m
1991	South American Championships	Manaus, Brazil	2nd	73.88 m
1991	Pan American Games	Havana, Cuba	7th	70.86 m
1991	World Championships	Tokyo, Japan	30th (q)	70.70 m
1992	Ibero-American Championships	Seville, Spain	6th	66.90 m
1993	South American Championships	Lima, Peru	1st	72.86 m
1993	World Championships	Stuttgart, Germany	31st (q)	73.26 m
1994	South American Games	Valencia, Venezuela	2nd	76.50 m
1995	Pan American Games	Mar del Plata, Argentina	5th	74.18 m
1996	Ibero-American Championships	Medellín, Colombia	2nd	74.22 m
1997	South American Championships	Mar del Plata, Argentina	6th	69.70 m
1998	Ibero-American Championships	Lisbon, Portugal	3rd	74.54 m
