= Viktor Yevsyukov =

Ukrainian javelin thrower (born 1956)

Personal information
- Native name: Виктор Александрович Евсюков
- Full name: Viktor Aleksandrovich Yevsyukov
- Nationality: Kazakh
- Born: October 6, 1956 (age 69) Stalino, Ukrainian SSR, Soviet Union
- Height: 1.88 m (6 ft 2 in)
- Weight: 100 kg (220 lb)

Sport
- Country: Soviet Union; Kazakhstan
- Sport: Athletics
- Event: Javelin throw
- Club: Dynamo Almaty

Achievements and titles
- Personal bests: 93.70 m (1985, old model); 85.16 m (1987, new model)
Medal record
Men's Athletics
Representing Soviet Union
World Championships
| Silver medal – second place | 1987 Rome | Javelin |
European Championships
| Bronze medal – third place | 1986 Stuttgart | Javelin |

Viktor Aleksandrovich Yevsyukov (Russian: Виктор Апександрович Евсюков, born October 6, 1956, in Stalino (now Donetsk), in the Ukrainian SSR of the Soviet Union) is a retired javelin thrower who represented the Soviet Union and later Kazakhstan during his active career. He won the silver medal at the 1987 World Championships in Rome.

His personal best throw is 85.16 metres, achieved in June 1987 in Karl-Marx-Stadt (today Chemnitz). It is also the standing Kazakhstani record. His personal best with the old javelin design, in use prior to April 1986, was 93.70 metres, thrown in Kiev on July 17, 1985. This was the third best mark ever by a Soviet thrower, behind only Heino Puuste and Jānis Lūsis.

== Achievements ==
| Year | Competition | Venue | Position | Notes |
Representing Soviet Union
| 1986 | European Championships | Stuttgart, West Germany | 3rd | 81.80 m |
| 1987 | World Championships | Rome, Italy | 2nd | 82.52 m |
| 1988 | Olympic Games | Seoul, South Korea | 5th | 82.32 m |
Representing Kazakhstan
| 1993 | World Championships | Stuttgart, Germany | 37th | 71.12 m |
