= Ari Pakarinen =

Finnish javelin thrower (born 1969)

Ari Pakarinen (born 14 May 1969) is a retired male javelin thrower from Finland. His personal best throw is 85.18 metres, achieved in July 1995 in Lapua.

He finished fifth at the 1993 World Championships. He later qualified for the final at the 2002 European Championships, but finished last with no valid result.

== International competitions ==
Year	Competition	Venue	Position	Notes
Representing Finland
1991	World Championships	Tokyo, Japan	19th	76.14 m
1993	World Championships	Stuttgart, Germany	5th	81.08 m
2002	European Championships	Munich, Germany	—	DNF

== Seasonal bests ==
- 1986 - 56.04
- 1987 - 64.04
- 1988 - 71.46
- 1989 - 79.39
- 1990 - 80.76
- 1991 - 82.52
- 1992 - 84.00
- 1993 - 83.08
- 1994 - 83.38
- 1995 - 85.18
- 1996 - 77.64
- 1997 - 77.80
- 1998 - 76.70
- 1999 - 77.97
- 2000 - 78.71
- 2001 - 81.27
- 2002 - 83.03
- 2003 - 76.80
- 2004 - 79.27
