= Tero Saviniemi =

Finnish javelin thrower

Tero Tapani Saviniemi (born 8 July 1963 in Tampere) is a retired male javelin thrower from Finland. He competed for his native country at the 1984 Summer Olympics in Los Angeles, California, finishing in 17th place. He set his personal best (86.78 metres) with the old javelin in 1984. Sabiniemi won the national title in 1984.

== Achievements ==
Year	Competition	Venue	Position	Notes
Representing Finland
1984	Olympic Games	Los Angeles, United States	17th	76.46 m
