= Dmitry Polyunin =

Uzbekistani javelin thrower

Dmitriy Polyunin (Russian: Дмитрий Полюнин; born April 6, 1969) is a retired javelin thrower from Uzbekistan, who competed for the Unified Team at the 1992 Summer Olympics in Barcelona, Spain. There he did not reach the final, although he was ranked as the number ten of the world in 1992 (85.74 metres).

== Doping ==
Polyunin tested positive for the anabolic steroid stanozolol at the 1993 World Championships in Athletics and had to hand back the bronze medal. He received a four-year ban from sports for the anti-doping rule violation.

== Seasonal bests by year ==
- 1988 - 69.12
- 1991 - 78.50
- 1992 - 85.74
- 1993 - 81.04
- 1999 - 77.74
- 2000 - 77.74

== Achievements ==
Year	Competition	Venue	Position	Notes
Representing the Soviet Union
1988	World Junior Championships	Sudbury, Canada	4th	69.12 m
1991	World Championships	Tokyo, Japan	14th	78.50 m
Representing Unified Team
1992	Olympic Games	Barcelona, Spain	18th	76.40 m
Representing Uzbekistan
1993	World Championships	Stuttgart, Germany	DSQ (3rd)	Doping
