= Kimmo Kinnunen =

Finnish javelin thrower (born 1968)

Personal information
- Full name: Kimmo Paavali Kinnunen
- Nationality: Finnish
- Born: 31 March 1968 (age 58) Äänekoski, Finland
- Height: 1.87 m (6 ft 2 in)
- Weight: 99 kg (218 lb)

Sport
- Country: Finland
- Sport: Track and field
- Event: Javelin throw

Achievements and titles
- Personal best: 90.82 m (1991)
Medal record
Men's Athletics
Representing Finland
World Championships
| Gold medal – first place | 1991 Tokyo | Javelin |
| Silver medal – second place | 1993 Stuttgart | Javelin |

Kimmo Paavali Kinnunen (born 31 March 1968) is a Finnish former javelin thrower. He won gold at the 1991 World Championships in Tokyo and silver at the 1993 World Championships in Stuttgart.

His other achievements include a 4th-place finish at the 1992 Summer Olympics in Barcelona and 7th-place finish at the 1996 Summer Olympics in Atlanta. His personal best is 90.82 from the 1991 World Championships.

Kimmo Kinnunen is son of javelin thrower Jorma Kinnunen.

== International competitions ==
| Year | Competition | Venue | Position | Notes |
Representing Finland
| 1986 | World Junior Championships | Athens, Greece | 5th | 70.96 m |
| 1988 | Olympic Games | Seoul, South Korea | 10th | 78.04 m |
| 1990 | European Championships | Split, SFR Yugoslavia | 8th | 79.00 m |
| 1991 | World Championships | Tokyo, Japan | 1st | 90.82 m |
| 1992 | Olympic Games | Barcelona, Spain | 4th | 82.62 m |
| 1993 | World Championships | Stuttgart, Germany | 2nd | 84.78 m |
| 1996 | Olympic Games | Atlanta, Georgia, United States | 7th | 84.02 m |

== Seasonal bests by year ==
- 1986 - 71.72
- 1987 - 72.94
- 1988 - 80.24
- 1989 - 83.10
- 1990 - 81.46
- 1991 - 90.82
- 1992 - 83.42
- 1993 - 84.78
- 1994 - 79.34
- 1995 - 82.64
- 1996 - 85.32
- 1997 - 82.48
- 1998 - 84.23
- 1999 - 85.96
- 2000 - 81.41
- 2001 - 81.35
- 2002 - 80.39
- 2003 - 74.54
