= Rudolf Steiner (athlete) =

Swiss javelin thrower

for others with the same name, see Rudolf Steiner (disambiguation)

Rudolf Steiner (born January 16, 1951) is a retired track and field athlete from Switzerland, who competed in the men's javelin throw event during his career. He represented his native country at the 1988 Summer Olympics in Seoul, South Korea, where he didn't reach the final after throwing 76.02 metres in the qualification round.

== Achievements ==
Year	Competition	Venue	Position	Notes
Representing Switzerland
1988	Olympic Games	Seoul, South Korea	24th	76.02 m
1990	European Championships	Split, FR Yugoslavia	26th	73.12 m
