= Mike O'Rourke (athlete) =

New Zealand javelin thrower

Personal information
- Born: 25 August 1955 (age 70) Croydon, New South Wales, Australia

Sport
- Country: New Zealand
- Sport: Track and field
- Event: Javelin throw

Achievements and titles
- National finals: Javelin throw champion (1976, 1977, 1978, 1979, 1980, 1981, 1982, 1988)
Medal record
Men's athletics
Representing New Zealand
Commonwealth Games
Silver medal – second place	1978 Edmonton	Javelin
Gold medal – first place	1982 Brisbane	Javelin

Michael David O'Rourke (born 25 August 1955) is a former New Zealand javelin thrower. He represented his country at the 1984 Summer Olympics in Los Angeles and at three Commonwealth Games. He was national champion eight times. O'Rourke was born in Croydon, New South Wales, Australia. In 1990, he was awarded the New Zealand 1990 Commemoration Medal.

O'Rourke won two British AAA Championships titles in the javelin at the 1981 AAA Championships and 1983 AAA Championships.

== Personal bests ==
- Pre-1986 specification:

90.58 m NR

- 1986 specification:

79.00 m

== Achievements ==
Year	Competition	Venue	Position	Notes
Representing New Zealand
1978	Commonwealth Games	Edmonton, Canada	2nd	83.18 m
1982	Commonwealth Games	Brisbane, Australia	1st	89.48 m = CR
1984	Olympic Games	Los Angeles, United States	—	NM
1990	Commonwealth Games	Auckland, New Zealand	5th	79.00 m PB
