= Phillip Spies =

Philip Spies - South African javelin thrower

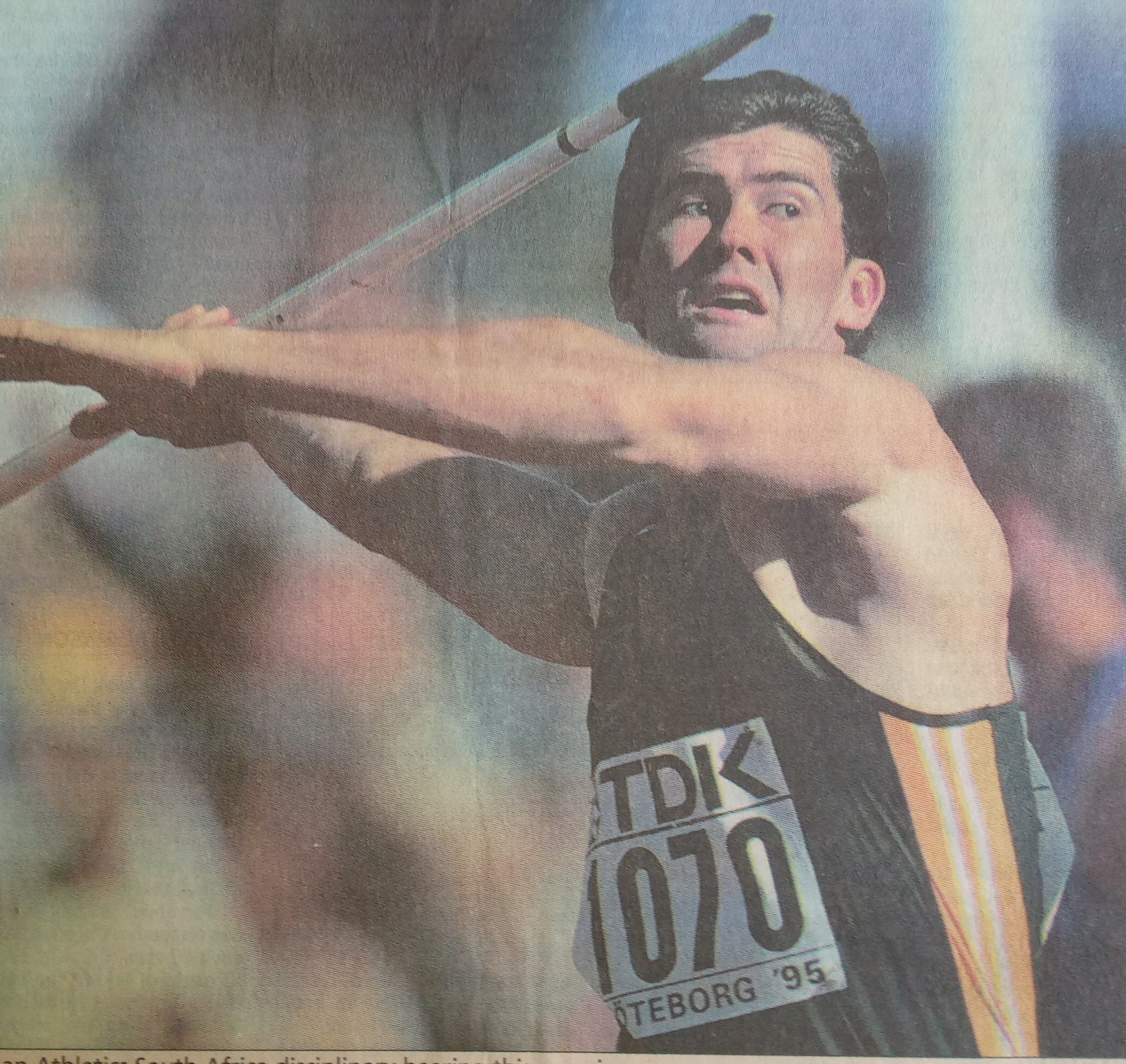
- Spies in 1995.

Medal record

Men's athletics

Representing South Africa

African Championships
Silver medal – second place	1993 Durban	Javelin throw
Bronze medal – third place	1992 Belle Vue Harel	Javelin throw

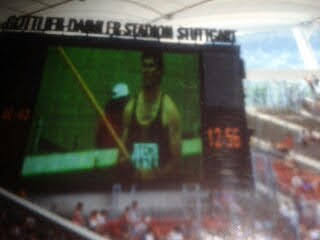

Philip Spies (born 21 May 1970) is a retired South African javelin thrower. Primarily a provincial cricketer at school and South African Country District level, he chose athletics over cricket. The arrival in South Africa of the USA's World Record Holder, Tom Petranoff (in 1989) was a deciding factor for Spies with regards to choosing athletics over cricket. Petranoff became an integral part of Spies' athletics career and still regards Petranoff as being one of the great javelin throwers of all time: 99.72 meters old model and 85.38 meters new model.

Spies became South African Schools champion at 17 years of age and achieved South African Schools Colors in 1988. IAAF ranked third in the world in 1988 as 17 year old throwing 72,24 meters in Nelspruit, EasternTransvaal with the 800g javelin.

Spies played on the SA Tennis Union circuit in 1990/1991, a competitive golfer, RE/MAX long drive participant (412 meters best) and a golf handicap of five.

He won the bronze medal at the 1992 African Championships, the silver medal at the 1993 African Championships, finished eighth at the 1994 Commonwealth Games, and won the silver medal at the 1995 All-Africa Games. He competed at the 1993 World Championships and the 1995 World Championships without reaching the final.

His personal best throw was 84.02 metres, achieved in April 1995 in Pietersburg. Unofficially threw 89.10 m in Harare, Zimbabwe in 1995, throw not ratified. Competed in more than 45 countries worldwide in the colours of Rand Afrikaans University and representing South Africa.

Spies managed to throw the Sandvik Diana 90m 600 gram javelin over 105 meters during training in Helsinki, Finland in 1993.
