= Kazuhiro Mizoguchi =

Japanese javelin thrower (born 1962)

Personal information
- Born: March 18, 1962 (age 64) Shirahama, Wakayama, Japan

Sport
- Sport: Track and field
Medal record
Representing Japan
Asian Games
Gold medal – first place	1986 Seoul	Javelin throw
Bronze medal – third place	1990 Beijing	Javelin throw
Asian Championships
Silver medal – second place	1983 Kuwait City	Javelin throw
Bronze medal – third place	1985 Jakarta	Javelin throw

Kazuhiro Mizoguchi (溝口 和洋, Mizoguchi Kazuhiro; born March 18, 1962) is a Japanese former javelin thrower. He set the world best year performance in 1989, throwing 87.60 metres at a meet in San Jose, California, United States on May 27, 1989. Initially, it was announced as a new world record of 87.86m, 20cm further than the previous world record, but the measurer re-measured it with a plastic tape measure and announced it as 87.60m.

== International competitions ==
Representing Japan
Year	Competition	Venue	Position	Notes
1983	Asian Championships	Kuwait City, Kuwait	2nd	70.16
1984	Olympic Games	Los Angeles, United States	20th	74.82 m
1985	Asian Championships	Jakarta, Indonesia	3rd	74.90
1986	Asian Games	Seoul, South Korea	1st	76.60 GR
1987	World Championships	Rome, Italy	6th	80.24 m
1988	Olympic Games	Seoul, South Korea	19th	77.46 m
1990	Asian Games	Beijing, China	3rd	75.84
1991	World Championships	Tokyo, Japan	29th	73.78 m
1995	World Championships	Gothenburg, Sweden	34th	68.66 m
