= Dave Stephens (javelin thrower) =

American javelin thrower

Personal information
- Born: February 8, 1962 (age 64) Chico, California, United States

Sport
- Sport: Track and field

David Eldon Stephens (born February 8, 1962) is a retired male javelin thrower from United States, who twice represented his native country at the Summer Olympics: in 1988 and 1996. He set his personal best (83.88 metres) with the old javelin type on May 3, 1991, in Knoxville, Tennessee. Stephens is a 1987 graduate of California State University, Northridge.

== Achievements ==
Year	Competition	Venue	Position	Notes
Representing the United States
1988	Olympic Games	Seoul, South Korea	14th (q)	78.42 m
1991	Pan American Games	Havana, Cuba	8th	69.80 m
1991	World Championships	Tokyo, Japan	24th (q)	75.10 m
1996	Olympic Games	Atlanta, United States	15th (q)	79.18 m
