= Tom Pukstys =

American track and field athlete

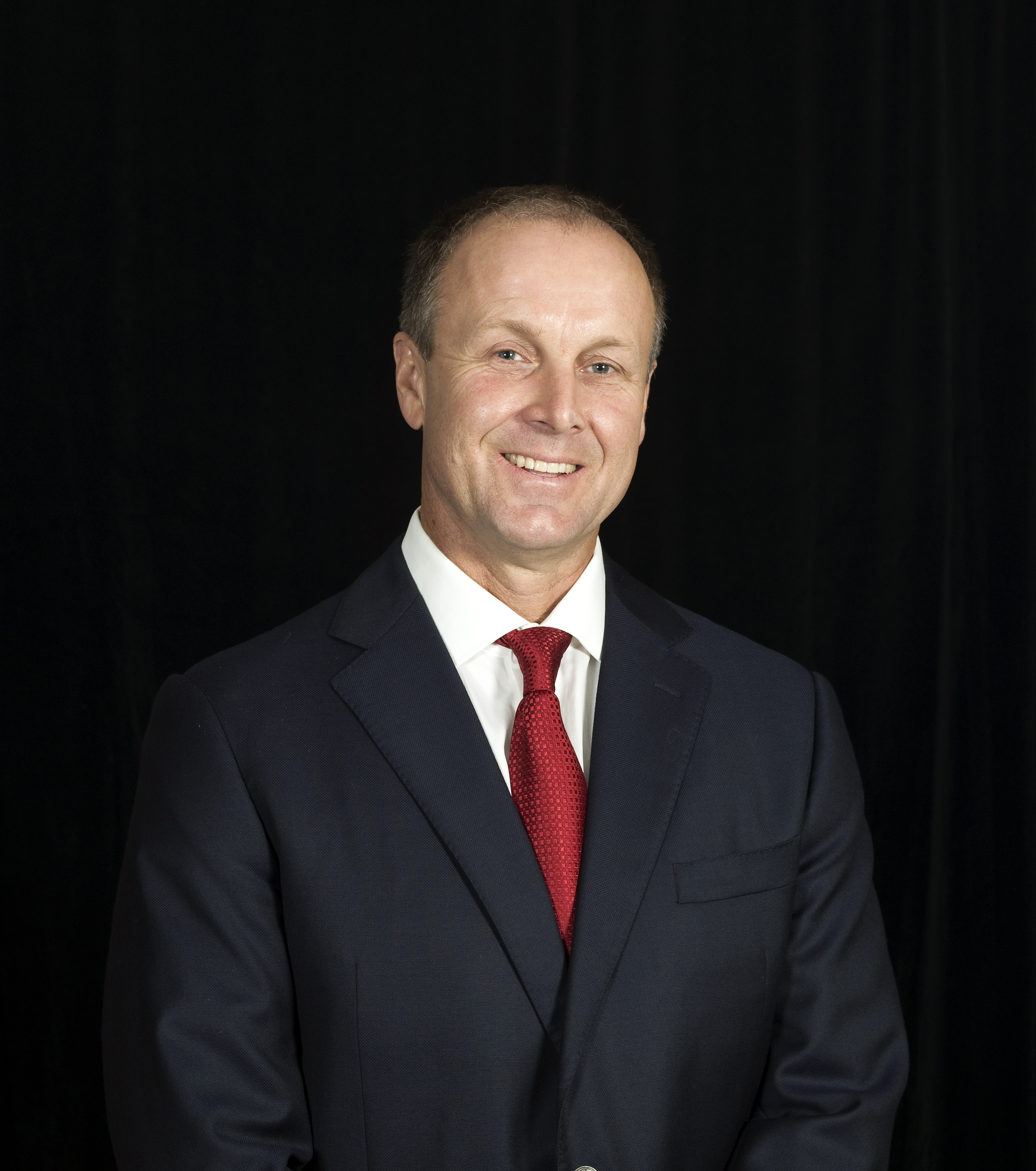
- Pukstys in 2019

Personal information
- Full name: Thomas Paul Pukstys
- National team: United States
- Born: May 28, 1968 (age 58) Glen Ellyn, Illinois, U.S.
- Height: 6 ft 2 in (1.88 m)
- Weight: 216 lb (98 kg)

Sport
- Sport: Track and field
- Event: Javelin throw
- College team: College of DuPage; University of Florida

Thomas Paul Pukstys (born May 28, 1968) is an American former track and field athlete who was a javelin thrower. Pukstys was a six-time U.S. javelin champion, and represented the United States at the 1992 and 1996 Summer Olympics.

== Biography ==
Pukstys's parents came to the U.S. from Lithuania in 1949. He was born in Glen Ellyn, Illinois. He graduated from Amos Alonzo Stagg High School in Palos Hills, Illinois. His older brother Andrew was attending medical school in Lithuania, and returned home with a gift for Pukstys: a javelin. Thereafter, Pukstys quit the high school baseball team and went out for the track team, throwing the javelin 155 feet in his first track meet.

For his first two years as an undergraduate, Pukstys enrolled in the College of DuPage in Glen Ellyn and was a member of the DuPage Chaparrals track and field team. After his sophomore year, he accepted an athletic scholarship to transfer to the University of Florida in Gainesville, Florida, where he was a member of the Florida Gators track and field team. He graduated from the University of Florida with a bachelor's degree in public relations in 1992.

Pukstys broke his first American record in June 1993. His personal best was a throw of 87.12 meters in 1997.

Pusktys was an assistant track and field coach for the U.S. Olympic team that competed in the 2012 Summer Olympics in London.

After attending a Valparaiso University master's program, in 2015 Pukstys coached the Valparaiso Beacons track and field program.

== Seasonal bests by year ==
- 1987 - 71.34
- 1988 - 75.72
- 1989 - 74.82
- 1990 - 83.30
- 1991 - 81.68
- 1992 - 83.20
- 1993 - 85.70
- 1994 - 82.32
- 1995 - 84.50
- 1996 - 86.82
- 1997 - 87.12
- 1998 - 85.06
- 1999 - 84.11
- 2000 - 84.25
- 2001 - 79.48
- 2003 - 79.31
- 2004 - 78.85

== Achievements ==
Year	Competition	Venue	Position	Notes
1991	World Championships	Tokyo, Japan	26th	74.72 m
1992	Olympic Games	Barcelona, Spain	10th	76.72 m
1993	World Championships	Stuttgart, Germany	9th	77.92 m
1995	World Championships	Gothenburg, Sweden	19th	76.12 m
1996	Olympic Games	Atlanta, Georgia, United States	8th	83.58 m
1997	World Championships	Athens, Greece	15th	78.64 m
1997	IAAF Grand Prix Final	Fukuoka, Japan	4th	85.68 m
1998	Goodwill Games	Uniondale, New York, United States	2nd	79.86 m
1999	World Championships	Seville, Spain	—	DNS
2001	World Championships	Edmonton, Canada	20th	78.10 m

== See also ==
- Florida Gators
- List of University of Florida alumni
- List of University of Florida Olympians
