= Mike Mahovlich =

Canadian javelin thrower

Personal information
- Born: August 27, 1960 (age 65) Burnaby, British Columbia, Canada

Sport
- Sport: Track and field

Michael G. "Mike" Mahovlich (born August 27, 1960) is a retired male javelin thrower from Canada, who won a total number of two national titles (1988 and 1989) during his career. He competed at the 1987 World Championships and the 1988 Summer Olympics, but did not reach the final. Mahovlich set his personal best on April 26, 1986, throwing 79.04 metres.

Mahovlich was an All-American thrower for the Washington Huskies track and field team, finishing 7th in the javelin at the 1979 NCAA Division I Outdoor Track and Field Championships.

== Achievements ==
Year	Competition	Venue	Position	Notes
Representing Canada
1987	World Championships	Rome, Italy	34th	67.64 m
1988	Olympic Games	Seoul, South Korea	31st	69.44 m
