= Gavin Lovegrove =

New Zealand javelin thrower

Personal information
- Full name: Gavin Brian Lovegrove
- Born: 21 October 1967 (age 58) Hamilton, New Zealand
- Height: 1.88 m (6 ft 2 in)
- Weight: 94 kg (207 lb)

Achievements and titles
- Personal bests: NR 88.20 m (1996)
Medal record
Men's athletics
Representing New Zealand
Commonwealth Games
Bronze medal – third place	1986 Edinburgh	Javelin
Bronze medal – third place	1990 Auckland	Javelin
Bronze medal – third place	1994 Victoria	Javelin

Gavin Brian Lovegrove (born 21 October 1967) is a retired New Zealand track and field athlete who competed in the javelin throw. His personal best of 88.20 m, set in 1996, is the New Zealand record. During his career, he twice represented his homeland at the Summer Olympics (1992 and 1996), won a bronze medal at three consecutive Commonwealth Games (1986, 1990 and 1994) and participated in five World Championships (1987, 1991, 1993, 1995 and 1997). He also twice broke the world junior record (76.68 m and 79.58 m, both 1986) and was a six-time national champion (1987, 1990, 1991, 1992, 1993 and 1994).

In 1990, Lovegrove was awarded the New Zealand 1990 Commemoration Medal. After retirement from competition, Lovegrove went into computer science and now works as a web developer.

== Personal bests ==
Event	Distance	Place	Date
Javelin	88.20m NR	Oslo	1996

== Seasonal bests by year ==
- 1985 – 77.12m (700gm) & 80.00m (800gm – old specifications rules javelin)
- 1986 – 79.58m (800gm – new specifications rules javelin) – World Junior Record
- 1987 – 80.20m (800gm)
- 1988 – 80.70m
- 1989 – 83.90m
- 1990 – 82.64m
- 1991 – 85.18m (Rough tailed implement)
- 1992 – 86.14m
- 1993 – 85.34m
- 1994 – 84.50m
- 1995 – 85.54m
- 1996 – 88.20m NR
- 1997 – 82.38m
- 1998 – 82.08m

== Achievements ==
Year	Competition	Venue	Position	Notes
Representing New Zealand
1986	World Junior Championships	Athens, Greece	3rd	74.22 m
1987	World Championships	Rome, Italy	23rd	74.16 m
1991	World Championships	Tokyo, Japan	4th	84.24 m
1992	Olympic Games	Barcelona, Spain	9th	77.08 m
1993	World Championships	Stuttgart, Germany	15th	77.08 m
1995	World Championships	Gothenburg, Sweden	20th	74.98 m
1996	Olympic Games	Atlanta, Georgia, United States	23rd	77.12 m
1997	World Championships	Athens, Greece	21st	75.62 m
