= Masami Yoshida (javelin thrower) =

Japanese javelin thrower (1958–2000)

Personal information
- Nationality: Japanese
- Born: 14 June 1958 Arida, Wakayama, Japan
- Died: 7 March 2000 (aged 41) Tokyo, Japan
- Height: 179 cm (5 ft 10 in)
- Weight: 90 kg (198 lb)

Sport
- Sport: Athletics
- Event: Javelin throw
Medal record
Men's athletics
Representing Japan
Asian Championships
Gold medal – first place	1983 Kuwait City	Javelin throw
Silver medal – second place	1991 Kuala Lumpur	Javelin throw
Bronze medal – third place	1981 Tokyo	Javelin throw

Masami Yoshida (Japanese: 吉田 雅美; 14 June 1958 – 7 March 2000) was a javelin thrower from Japan, who represented his native country in three consecutive Summer Olympics, starting in 1984. He was born in Arida. He achieved his personal best (75.96 metres) on 25 August 1991 during the World Championships in Tokyo, Japan.

Yoshida finished third behind David Ottley in the javelin throw event at the British 1985 AAA Championships.

Yoshida committed suicide in Tokyo in 2000.

== Achievements ==
Year	Competition	Venue	Position	Notes
Representing Japan
1984	Olympic Games	Los Angeles, United States	5th	81.98 m
1987	World Championships	Rome, Italy	22nd	74.90 m
1988	Olympic Games	Seoul, South Korea	21st	76.90 m
1990	Goodwill Games	Seattle, United States	3rd	77.36 m
1991	World Championships	Tokyo, Japan	22nd	75.96 m
1992	Olympic Games	Barcelona, Spain	23rd	72.88 m
