= Colin Mackenzie (athlete) =

Welsh javelin thrower

Personal information
- Nationality: British (Welsh)
- Born: 30 June 1963 (age 62) Haverfordwest, Wales

Sport
- Sport: Athletics
- Event: Javelin
- Club: Newham and Essex Beagles A.C.

Colin Mackenzie (born 30 June 1963) is a retired British javelin thrower.

== Biography ==
Mackenzie finished seventh at the 1986 Commonwealth Games. He also competed at the 1991 World Championships, the 1993 World Championships and the 1994 European Championships without reaching the final.

Throwing for Wales in 1986, he later switched his Commonwealth Games allegiance to England. His personal best throw was 82.60 achieved in Oristano, Italy June 1991 Edinburgh.

Mackenzie became the British javelin throw champion after winning the British AAA Championships title at the 1993 AAA Championships. It was a significant feat bearing in mind that at the time Britain had some of the world's leading javelin throwers in Steve Backley and Mick Hill.

At a meet in Palio della Quercia, Italy on 24 July 1994, Mackenzie failed a doping test, having taken dextropropoxyphene. The medication was for an ankle injury that would also bar him from competing at the 1994 Commonwealth Games in August. In September, the failed test was revealed. Mackenzie claimed his innocence, and that the medication was not performance-enhancing, but rather had the adverse effect. Nonetheless, Mackenzie received a doping ban for three months, the same as his fellow countryman Solomon Wariso.
