= Julián Sotelo =

Spanish javelin thrower

Julián Sotelo Madrazo (born July 5, 1965 in Santander, Cantabria) is a retired male javelin thrower from Spain, who finished in 20th place (75.34 metres) at the 1992 Summer Olympics in Barcelona, Spain. He set his personal best (78.78 m) in 1992. Sotelo is a seven-time national champion in the men's javelin throw.

== Achievements ==
Year	Competition	Venue	Position	Notes
Representing Spain
1988	Ibero-American Championships	Mexico City, Mexico	3rd	69.30 m A
1990	Ibero-American Championships	Manaus, Brazil	2nd	68.10 m
1991	Mediterranean Games	Athens, Greece	1st	76.04 m
1991	World Championships	Tokyo, Japan	39th (q)	65.74 m
1992	Ibero-American Championships	Seville, Spain	3rd	70.50 m
1992	Olympic Games	Barcelona, Spain	20th (q)	75.34 m
1993	Mediterranean Games	Narbonne, France	9th	65.06 m
1994	Ibero-American Championships	Mar del Plata, Argentina	2nd	73.88 m
