= Vladimir Ovchinnikov (athlete) =

Russian javelin thrower

Personal information
- Born: 2 August 1970 (age 56) Volgograd, Soviet Union

Sport
- Sport: Track and field
Medal record
Representing Soviet Union
Summer Universiade
Silver medal – second place	1991 Sheffield	Javelin throw

Vladimir Olegovich Ovchinnikov (Russian: Владимир Олегович Овчинников; born 2 August 1970) is a retired male javelin thrower from Russia, who competed in three Summer Olympics, starting in 1988 (Seoul, South Korea) for the Soviet Union. He set his personal best on 14 May 1995 in Tolyatti, throwing 88.00 metres.

== International competitions ==
Year	Competition	Venue	Position	Notes
Representing the Soviet Union
1988	World Junior Championships	Sudbury, Canada	1st	77.08 m
1988	Olympic Games	Seoul, South Korea	7th	79.12 m
1990	European Championships	Split, Yugoslavia	6th	81.78 m
Representing Russia
1993	World Championships	Stuttgart, Germany	13th	77.98 m
1995	World Championships	Gothenburg, Sweden	14th	78.28 m
1996	Olympic Games	Atlanta, United States	16th	78.20 m
2000	Olympic Games	Sydney, Australia	14th	82.10 m

== Seasonal bests by year ==
- 1988 – 80.26
- 1990 – 81.78
- 1993 – 77.98
- 1995 – 88.00
- 1996 – 78.20
- 1997 – 78.40
- 1999 – 80.29
- 2000 – 82.60
- 2001 – 78.72
