= Pascal Lefèvre =

French javelin thrower

Personal information
- Born: 25 January 1965 (age 61) Saint-Quentin, Aisne, France

Sport
- Sport: Track and field
- Club: ASPTT Grenoble
Medal record
Representing France
Summer Universiade
Silver medal – second place	1989 Duisburg	Javelin throw

Pascal Lefèvre (born 25 January 1965) is a retired javelin thrower from France, who competed at the 1988 Summer Olympics in Seoul, South Korea, but did not reach the final. He set his personal best (82.56 m) on 28 August 1989 in Duisburg, at the Summer Universiade. This performance has remained one of the longest lasting French national records in track and field: His 1989 record has held until it was beaten in 2024 by fellow French national athlete Teuraiterai Tupaia. Lefévre was nine times French national champion in the men's javelin event (1987–1995).

== Achievements ==
Year	Competition	Venue	Position	Notes
Representing France
1987	World Championships	Rome, Italy	10th	77.14 m
1988	Olympic Games	Seoul, South Korea	23rd	76.42 m
1989	Jeux de la Francophonie	Casablanca, Morocco	2nd	72.80 m
1989	Universiade	Duisburg, Germany	2nd	82.56 m
1990	European Championships	Split, FR Yugoslavia	7th	79.98 m
1991	World Championships	Tokyo, Japan	17th	77.26 m
1993	World Championships	Stuttgart, Germany	30th	73.34 m

== Seasonal bests by year ==
- 1987 - 80.60
- 1989 - 82.56
- 1990 - 79.98
- 1991 - 77.26
- 1993 - 74.98
- 1994 - 75.20
- 1995 - 66.32
