= Gerald Weiß =

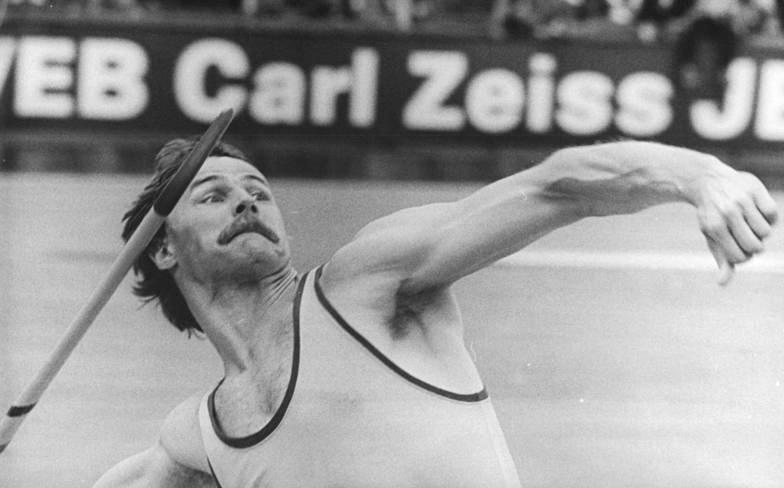
- Weiß in 1986

Personal information
- Full name: Gerhard Dietmar Eberhard Weiß
- Nationality: German
- Born: 8 January 1960 Lübz, Bezirk Schwerin, East Germany
- Died: 17 February 2018 (aged 58) Göhlsdorf, Kloster Lehnin municipality, Germany
- Height: 1.93 m (6 ft 4 in)
- Weight: 105 kg (231 lb)

Sport
- Country: East Germany
- Sport: Athletics
- Event: Javelin throw
- Club: SC Traktor Schwerin

Achievements and titles
- Personal best: 83.30 m (1988)
Medal record
Men's athletics
Representing East Germany
Universiade
Silver medal – second place	1981 Bucharest	Javelin throw

Gerhard Dietmar Eberhard Weiß (also spelled Weiss; 8 January 1960, in Lübz – 17 February 2018, in Kloster Lehnin) was an East German javelin thrower.

Weiß represented the sports club SC Traktor Schwerin, and became East German champion in 1981. He furthermore won silver medals at the East German championships in 1980, 1983, 1986, 1987, 1988 and bronze medals in 1984, 1989 and 1990. His personal best throw was 83.30 metres, achieved in June 1988 in Jena.

== Achievements ==
Year	Competition	Venue	Position	Notes
1986	European Championships	Stuttgart, West Germany	11th	
1988	Olympic Games	Seoul, South Korea	6th	
