= Silvio Warsönke =

East German javelin thrower

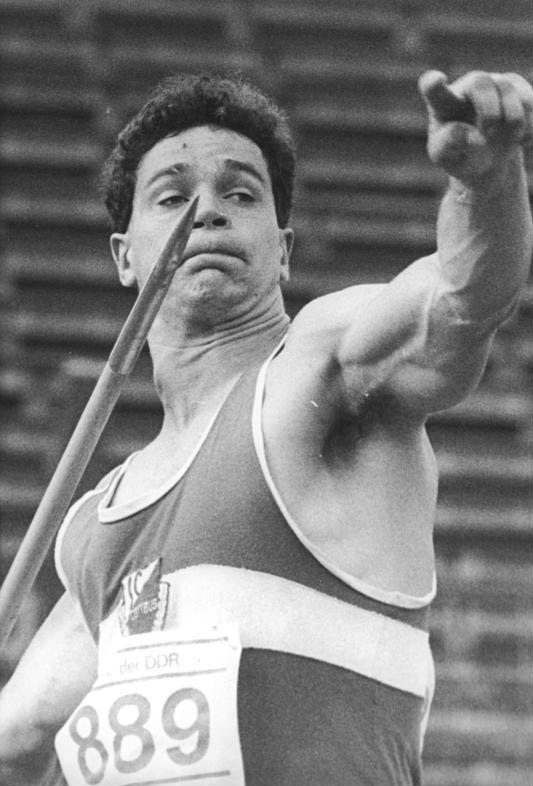
- Warsönke in 1988

Personal information
- Nationality: East Germany
- Born: 2 August 1967 (age 58) Finsterwalde, East Germany
- Height: 197 cm (6 ft 6 in)
- Weight: 105 kg (231 lb)

Sport
- Country: East Germany
- Sport: Javelin throw

Silvio Warsönke is an East German Olympic javelin thrower. He represented his country in the men's javelin throw at the 1988 Summer Olympics. His distance was a 78.22.
