= Lee Uk-jong =

South Korean javelin thrower

Personal information
- Nationality: South Korean
- Born: 26 October 1966 (age 59)

Sport
- Sport: Athletics
- Event: Javelin throw

Lee Uk-jong (born 26 October 1966) is a South Korean athlete. He competed in the men's javelin throw at the 1988 Summer Olympics.
