= Donald Sild =

Estonian javelin thrower

Donald-Aik Sild (born 3 October 1968) is a retired male javelin thrower from Estonia.

Sild was born in Tallinn, and represented his native country at the 1996 Summer Olympics in Atlanta, United States. He set his personal best (85.28 metres) on 11 June 1994 in Saint-Denis, France. It was the Estonian record.

== Achievements ==
Year	Competition	Venue	Position	Result
Representing Estonia
1994	European Championships	Helsinki, Finland	12th	75.38 m
1995	World Championships	Gothenburg, Sweden	—	NM
1996	Olympic Games	Atlanta, United States	30th	72.54 m
