= Miloš Steigauf =

Czech javelin thrower

Miloš Steigauf (born 5 December 1969 in Slaný) is a Czech javelin thrower. He has earned his living as a soldier.

He finished eleventh at the 1993 World Championships with a throw of 70.78 metres. He became the last Czechoslovak champion in javelin throw, before the country's dissolution.

== Achievements ==
Year	Competition	Venue	Position	Notes
Representing the Czech Republic
1993	World Championships	Stuttgart, Germany	11th	70.78 m
1994	European Championships	Helsinki, Finland	23rd	73.82 m
