= Yuriy Rybin =

Russian javelin thrower

Yuriy Rybin (Russian: Юрий Рыбин; born 5 March 1963) is a retired male javelin thrower from Russia. He set his personal best (86.98 metres) on 26 August 1995 in Nitra, and participated in the 1995 World Championships in Athletics.

== Seasonal bests by year ==
- 1993 - 76.58
- 1995 - 86.98
- 1997 - 78.16
- 1998 - 83.08
- 1999 - 79.00
- 2000 - 77.58
- 2001 - 81.22
- 2002 - 74.70

== International competitions ==
Representing Russia
| Year | Competition | Venue | Position | Notes |
|---|---|---|---|---|
| 1993 | World Championships | Stuttgart, Germany | 18th | 76.58 m |
| 1994 | European Championships | Helsinki, Finland | 17th | 76.38 m |
| 1995 | World Championships | Gothenburg, Sweden | 7th | 81.00 m |
| 1998 | European Championships | Budapest, Hungary | 22nd | 72.86 m |
