= Marek Kaleta =

Estonian javelin thrower

Personal information
- Born: 17 December 1961 (age 64) Kunda, then part of Estonian SSR, Soviet Union

Sport
- Sport: Track and field
Medal record
Representing Soviet Union
Summer Universiade
Gold medal – first place	1987 Zagreb	Javelin throw

Marek Kaleta (born 17 December 1961) is a retired Estonian male javelin thrower who represented the Soviet Union in the 1980s and later on Estonia. He set his personal best 83.30, which was the Estonian national record this time, on 12 August 1990 in Pieksämäki, Finland. Kaleta is best known for winning the gold medal in the men's javelin throw event at the 1987 Summer Universiade in Zagreb.

== Achievements ==
Year	Competition	Venue	Position	Result
Representing the Soviet Union
1986	European Championships	Stuttgart, West Germany	9th	77.16 m
1987	Summer Universiade	Zagreb, Yugoslavia	1st	81.42 m
1987	World Championships	Rome, Italy	16th	76.10 m
1990	Goodwill Games	Seattle, United States	4th	77.18 m
1990	European Championships	Split, Yugoslavia	14th	77.64 m
Representing Estonia
1993	World Championships	Stuttgart, Germany	24th	74.80 m
1994	European Championships	Helsinki, Finland	21st	74.46 m
