= Charlus Bertimon =

French javelin thrower

Charlus Michel Bertimon (born 1 January 1957 in Pointe-Noire, Basse-Terre, Guadeloupe) is a retired track and field athlete from France, who competed in the men's javelin throw event during his career. He represented France at the 1988 Summer Olympics in Seoul, South Korea, where he didn't reach the final after throwing 70.84 metres in the qualification round. He is the brother of Léone Bertimon, a former national champion in the men's shot put.
