= Tapio Korjus =

Finnish javelin thrower (born 1961)

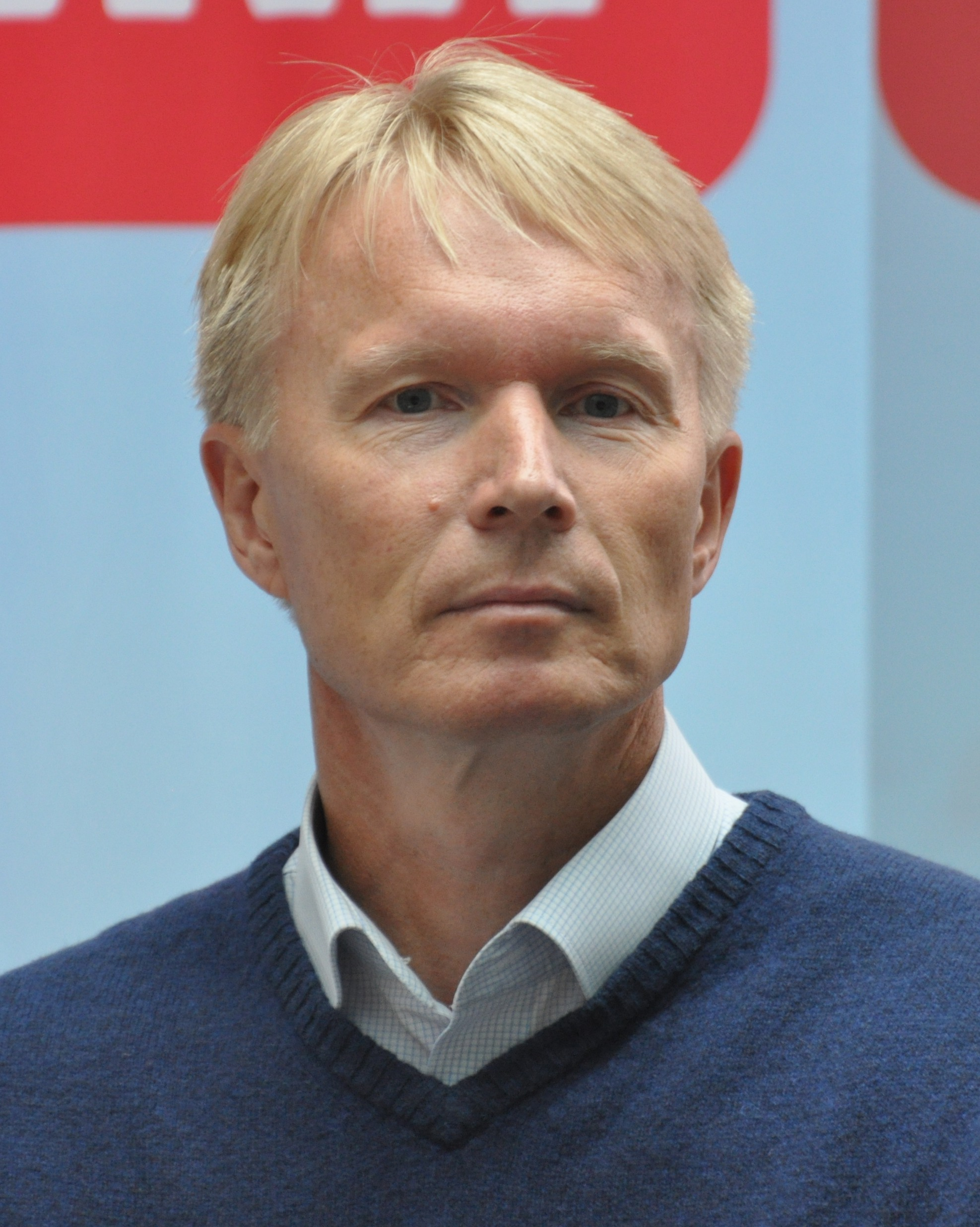
- Tapio Korjus in 2013

Personal information
- Full name: Seppo Tapio Aleksanteri Korjus
- Born: 10 February 1961 (age 65) Vehkalahti, Finland
- Height: 196 cm (6 ft 5 in)
- Weight: 102 kg (225 lb)

Sport
- Country: Finland
- Sport: Athletics
- Event: Javelin throw

Achievements and titles
- Personal best: 86.50 m (1988)
Medal record
Men's athletics
Representing Finland
Olympic Games
Gold medal – first place	1988 Seoul	Javelin

Tapio Korjus (born 10 February 1961, in Vehkalahti) is a Finnish Olympic champion former javelin thrower.

== Biography ==
Korjus was born in Vehkalahti. He was one of the leading javelin thrower in his home country in the 1980s, but did not attain international success until 1988.

At the Summer Olympics held in Seoul, South Korea, Korjus was second-placed for most of the contest. However, with the last throw of the competition, he threw the javelin 84.28 meters, winning the gold medal. Korjus continued to compete after his Olympic victory for one more season, and retired from sports at the end of 1989. He later worked as an athletics coach and has coached other javelin throwers including Mikaela Ingberg.

From 2007-11, Korjus was chairman of the Finnish National Sports Council and was re-elected as chairman of that council again in 2015. In 2010, Korjus also became chairman of the Finnish NOC professional sports committee.
