= Peter Borglund =

Swedish javelin thrower

Peter Lars Mikael Borglund (born 29 January 1964) is a retired javelin thrower from Sweden, who represented his native country at two consecutive Summer Olympics (1988 and 1992). He is a five-time Swedish champion in the men's javelin event (1987, 1988, 1989, 1990 and 1996). His personal best is 84.76 metres, thrown on August 19, 1989, in Stockholm.

Borglund competed for the Texas Longhorns track and field team in the NCAA.

== Achievements ==
Year	Competition	Venue	Position	Notes
Representing Sweden
1987	World Championships	Rome, Italy	11th	75.46 m
1988	Olympic Games	Seoul, South Korea	9th	78.22 m
1990	European Championships	Split, SFR Yugoslavia	16th	77.46 m
1991	World Championships	Tokyo, Japan	27th	74.40 m
1992	Olympic Games	Barcelona, Spain	22nd	74.72 m
1993	World Championships	Stuttgart, Germany	25th	74.58 m
