= Stephen Feraday =

Canadian javelin thrower

Personal information
- Born: April 5, 1959 (age 66) Toronto, Ontario, Canada

Sport
- Sport: Track and field

Stephen "Steve" Feraday (born April 5, 1959) is a retired track and field athlete from Canada, who competed in the men's javelin throw event during his career. A member of the University of Toronto athletics club, Feraday represented his native country at two consecutive Summer Olympics, beginning with Seoul. Feraday threw his personal record 77.82 in 1988.

== Achievements ==
Year	Competition	Venue	Position	Notes
Representing Canada
1988	Olympic Games	Seoul, South Korea	28th	73.32 m
1992	Olympic Games	Barcelona, Spain	29th	70.94 m
1993	World Championships	Stuttgart, Germany	42nd	68.40 m
