= Mike Barnett (athlete) =

American javelin thrower (born 1961)

Personal information
- Born: May 21, 1961 (age 65) Montebello, California, United States

Sport
- Sport: Track and field
Medal record
Representing United States
Pan American Games
Silver medal – second place	1991 Havana	Javelin throw
Pan American Junior Athletics Championships
Gold medal – first place	1980 Sudbury	Javelin throw

Michael H. Barnett (born May 21, 1961) is an American athlete who competes in the javelin. He competed in the 1992 Summer Olympics, finishing 7th.

Following the prime of his athletic career, Barnett went into coaching at Azusa Pacific University. He coached decathlete Bryan Clay to the 2008 gold medal in the decathlon. He also was part of the track and field team in the Spanish club Larios A.A.M. now named Asociación Atlética Moratalaz, directed by Rafael Pajaron.
