= Dag Wennlund =

Swedish javelin thrower

Dag Bengt Wennlund (born 6 October 1963) is a retired javelin thrower from Sweden, who represented his native country at three consecutive Summer Olympics (1988, 1992 and 1996). He is a three-time Swedish champion in the men's javelin event (1985, 1986 and 1991). His personal best is 85.02, thrown on May 28, 1995 in Alvesta.

Representing the Texas Longhorns men's track and field team, Wennlund won the 1986 and 1987 NCAA Division I Outdoor Track and Field Championships in the javelin.

== Achievements ==
Year	Competition	Venue	Position	Notes
Representing Sweden
1986	European Championships	Stuttgart, West Germany	15th (q)	76.88 m
1987	World Championships	Rome, Italy	8th	78.40 m
1988	Olympic Games	Seoul, South Korea	8th	78.30 m
1990	European Championships	Split, SFR Yugoslavia	16th	77.32 m
1991	World Championships	Tokyo, Japan	7th	81.14 m
1992	Olympic Games	Barcelona, Spain	15th	77.88 m
1993	World Championships	Stuttgart, Germany	6th	80.25 m
1994	European Championships	Helsinki, Finland	10th	78.52 m
1995	World Championships	Gothenburg, Sweden	5th	82.04 m
1996	Olympic Games	Atlanta, Georgia	26th	75.24 m
