= Seppo Räty =

Finnish javelin thrower (born 1962)

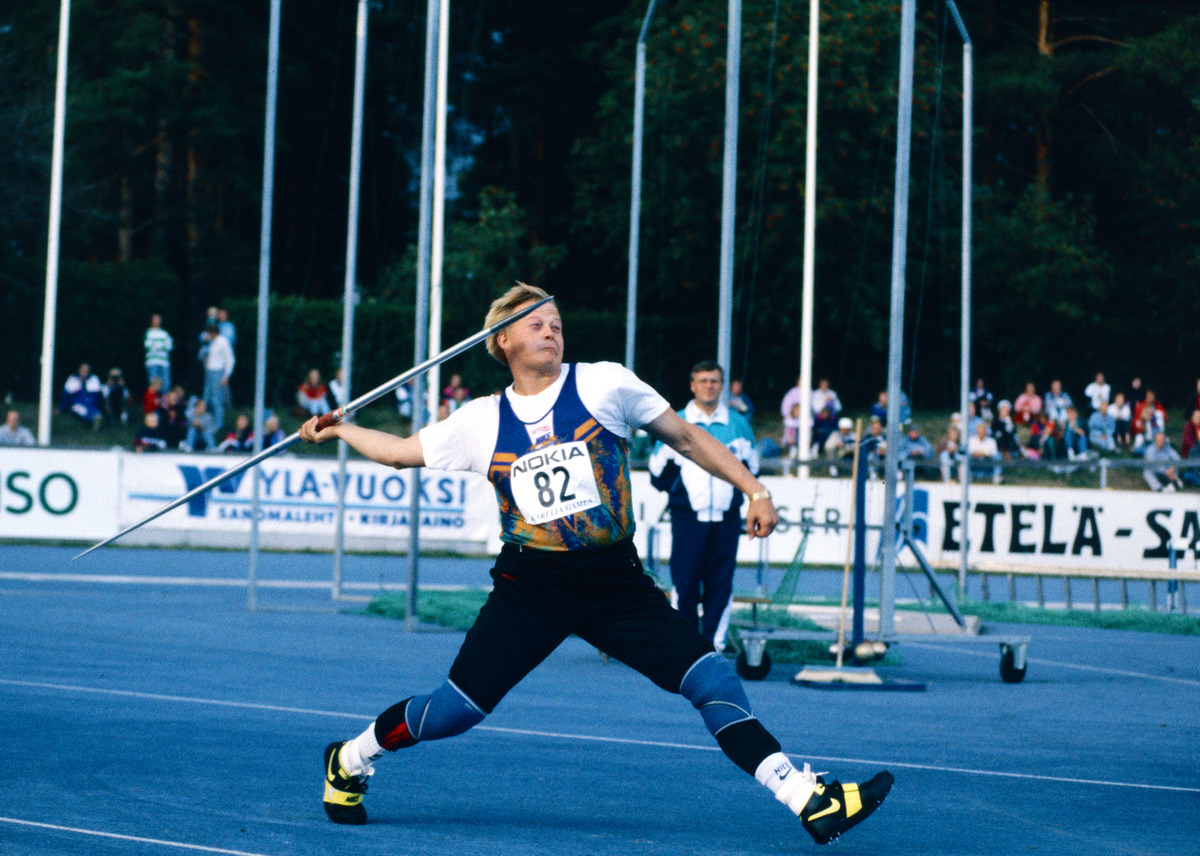
- Räty in 1992

Personal information
- Full name: Seppo Henrik Räty
- Nicknames: Tohmajärven karhu Tohmajärven tykki
- Nationality: Finnish
- Born: 27 April 1962 (age 64) Helsinki, Finland
- Years active: 1987-1997
- Height: 1.88 m (6 ft 2 in)
- Weight: 95 kg (209 lb) - 115kg

Sport
- Country: Finland (1987-1997)
- Sport: Track and field
- Event: Javelin throw

Achievements and titles
- Olympic finals: 1988 Seoul: Javelin throw; Bronze; 1992 Barcelona: Javelin throw; Silver; 1996 Atlanta: Javelin throw; Bronze
- World finals: 1987 Rome: Javelin throw; Gold; 1991 Tokyo: Javelin throw; Silver
- Personal best: 90.60 m (1992)
Medal record
Men's athletics
Representing Finland
Olympic Games
Silver medal – second place	1992 Barcelona	Javelin
Bronze medal – third place	1988 Seoul	Javelin
Bronze medal – third place	1996 Atlanta	Javelin
World Championships
Gold medal – first place	1987 Rome	Javelin
Silver medal – second place	1991 Tokyo	Javelin
European Championships
Silver medal – second place	1994 Helsinki	Javelin

Seppo Henrik Räty (born 27 April 1962) is a retired Finnish track and field athlete who competed in the javelin throw. He was a World Champion, having won gold in 1987. He was also an Olympic medalist (silver in 1992, bronze in 1988 and 1996). He was nicknamed Tohmajärven karhu ("The Bear of Tohmajärvi") and Tohmajärven tykki ("The Cannon of Tohmajärvi").

His personal best throw of 96.96 m, set in 1991, was one of his two world records with the "new javelin" at the time, however this throw was made using a "Nemeth" javelin that was banned by the IAAF later that year. All records made using this javelin were retrospectively deleted as from 20.9.1991 but remain ratified world records recognised by the IAAF. His best throw with the current javelin is 90.60 m, achieved in 1992.

While in the process of winning the 1987 World Championships, Räty was the subject of an often repeated video of failure. Räty tripped on the runway, his javelin throw sticking in the runway about 30 cm short of the foul line. While an embarrassing throw for negative gain, in fact since he had not crossed the line it did not even count as a foul.

After retiring, Räty became a coach. He currently (2008) mentors another javelin thrower from Northern Karelia, Oona Sormunen.

== Seasonal bests by year ==
- 1986 - 81.72
- 1987 - 83.54
- 1988 - 83.26
- 1989 - 83.92
- 1990 - 86.92
- 1991 - 96.96 (modified javelin)
- 1992 - 90.60
- 1993 - 85.68
- 1994 - 85.22
- 1995 - 87.68
- 1996 - 86.98
- 1997 - 82.22
- 1998 - 75.14
- 1999 - 79.47
