= Mārcis Štrobinders =

Latvian javelin thrower

Personal information
- Nationality: Latvian
- Born: 12 June 1966 (age 60) Talsi, Latvian SSR, Soviet Union

Sport
- Sport: Athletics
- Event: Javelin throw

Mārcis Štrobinders (born 12 June 1966) is a Latvian athlete. He competed in the men's javelin throw at the 1992 Summer Olympics.
