= Sigurður Einarsson (javelin thrower) =

Icelandic javelin thrower

Personal information
- Born: 28 September 1962 (age 63) Reykjavík, Iceland

Sport
- Sport: Track and field

Sigurður "Siggy" Einarsson (born 28 September 1962) is an Icelandic former javelin thrower. He competed at the Olympics in 1984, 1988 and 1992. His best result was 5th place in 1992.

Einarsson was part of a group of Icelandic athletes recruited to compete for the Alabama Crimson Tide track and field team in the 1980s. He was an All-American thrower for the program, finishing runner-up in the javelin at the 1986 NCAA Division I Outdoor Track and Field Championships.
