= Louis Fouché =

Louis Fouché may refer to:

- Louis Fouché (shot putter) (1913–1971), South African shot putter
- Louis Fouché (rugby union) (born 1990), South African rugby union footballer
- Louis Fouché (javelin thrower) (born 1970), South African javelin thrower
