= Athletics at the 1994 Commonwealth Games – Men's javelin throw =

Men's javelin throw at the Commonwealth Games

The men's javelin throw event at the 1994 Commonwealth Games was held on 28 August at the Centennial Stadium in Victoria, British Columbia.

== Results ==
Rank	Name	Nationality	#1	#2	#3	#4	#5	#6	Result	Notes
1st place, gold medalist(s)	Steve Backley	England	80.46	80.56	82.74	x	x		82.74	
2nd place, silver medalist(s)	Mick Hill	England	81.84	76.68	x			79.24	81.84	
3rd place, bronze medalist(s)	Gavin Lovegrove	New Zealand	79.12	x					80.42	
4	Nigel Bevan	Wales	75.32	76.38	x		80.38		80.38	
5	Louis Fouché	South Africa	72.92	73.44					77.00	
6	Andrew Currey	Australia							74.88	
7	Mark Roberson	England	73.78	x	72.68	72.10			73.78	
8	Phillip Spies	South Africa	x	69.78	69.80	71.08			72.70	
9	Lawrence Steinke	Canada	65.38	x	68.14				68.14	
10	Graham Morfitt	Canada	66.66	64.46	66.96				66.96	
11	Louis Brault	Canada							66.76	
