= Athletics at the 1990 Central American and Caribbean Games – Results =

These are the full results of the athletics competition at the 1990 Central American and Caribbean Games which took place between 28 November and 2 December 1990, at the Estadio Olímpico Universitario in Mexico City, Mexico.

== Men's results ==
=== 100 metres ===
Heats – 28 November
Wind:
Heat 1: +2.3 m/s, Heat 2: +0.5 m/s, Heat 3: +2.9 m/s

Rank	Heat	Name	Nationality	Time	Notes
1	2	Joel Isasi	Cuba	10.36	Q
2	1	Jorge Aguilera	Cuba	10.37	Q
3	1	Edgar Chourio	Venezuela	10.43	Q
4	3	Wayne Watson	Jamaica	10.48	Q
5	1	Eduardo Nava	Mexico	10.52	q
6	3	Junior Cornette	Guyana	10.52	Q
7	1	John Mair	Jamaica	10.56	q
8	2	Wesley Bradshaw	Barbados	10.83	Q
9	2	Herman Adam	Mexico	10.86	
10	3	Lindel Hodge	British Virgin Islands	10.87	
11	3	Manuel Gonel	Dominican Republic	10.91	
12	1	Willis Todman	British Virgin Islands	10.91	
13	2	Carlos García	Dominican Republic	10.93	
14	3	Michael Pearson	Costa Rica	11.05	
15	1	Henry Milligan	United States Virgin Islands	11.11	
16	2	Jimez Ashby	United States Virgin Islands	11.27	
17	2	Siegfried Regales	Netherlands Antilles	11.32	
18	3	Anthony Illidge	Aruba	11.35	
	1	Ronald Boyce	Barbados	DNS	

Final – 29 November

Wind: +5.3 m/s

Rank	Name	Nationality	Time	Notes
1st place, gold medalist(s)	Joel Isasi	Cuba	10.17	
2nd place, silver medalist(s)	Jorge Aguilera	Cuba	10.29	
3rd place, bronze medalist(s)	Wayne Watson	Jamaica	10.45	
4	Junior Cornette	Guyana	10.48	
5	John Mair	Jamaica	10.50	
6	Eduardo Nava	Mexico	10.52	
7	Edgar Chourio	Venezuela	10.54	
8	Wesley Bradshaw	Barbados	10.77	

=== 200 metres ===
Heats – 30 November
Wind:
Heat 1: +0.7 m/s, Heat 2: +1.5 m/s, Heat 3: +1.3 m/s

Rank	Heat	Name	Nationality	Time	Notes
1	1	Roberto Hernández	Cuba	20.64	Q
2	2	Félix Stevens	Cuba	20.85	Q
3	1	Edgardo Guilbe	Puerto Rico	20.89	Q
4	3	Junior Cornette	Guyana	21.33	Q
5	2	Henrico Atkins	Barbados	21.34	Q
6	3	Andrew Smith	Jamaica	21.40	Q
7	1	Wayde Payne	Barbados	21.52	q
8	2	Keith Smith	United States Virgin Islands	21.52	q
9	3	Eduardo Nava	Mexico	21.55	
10	2	Devon Campbell	Jamaica	21.65	
11	2	Willis Todman	British Virgin Islands	22.03	
12	3	Michael Pearson	Costa Rica	22.04	
13	2	Rafael Hernández	Dominican Republic	22.04	
14	1	William Archer	British Virgin Islands	22.15	
15	1	Jaime López	Mexico	22.17	
16	3	Anthony Illidge	Aruba	23.09	
17	3	Henry Milligan	United States Virgin Islands	23.20	
18	1	Siegfried Regales	Netherlands Antilles	23.35	
	1	Jimez Ashby	United States Virgin Islands	DNS	
	2	Edgar Chourio	Venezuela	DNS	
	2	César Krings	Guatemala	DNS	
	3	Manuel Gonel	Dominican Republic	DNS	

Final – 1 December

Wind: -0.3 m/s

Rank	Name	Nationality	Time	Notes
1st place, gold medalist(s)	Roberto Hernández	Cuba	20.72	
2nd place, silver medalist(s)	Edgardo Guilbe	Puerto Rico	20.79	
3rd place, bronze medalist(s)	Junior Cornette	Guyana	21.22	
4	Wayde Payne	Barbados	21.32	
5	Henrico Atkins	Barbados	21.38	
6	Keith Smith	United States Virgin Islands	21.71	
	Félix Stevens	Cuba	DNS	
	Andrew Smith	Jamaica	DNS	

=== 400 metres ===
Heats – 29 November

Rank	Heat	Name	Nationality	Time	Notes
1	1	Roberto Hernández	Cuba	46.60	Q
2	2	Devon Morris	Jamaica	46.94	Q
3	1	Alvin Daniel	Trinidad and Tobago	47.03	Q
4	2	Henry Aguiar	Venezuela	47.23	Q
5	1	Howard Burnett	Jamaica	47.29	Q
6	2	Héctor Herrera	Cuba	47.55	Q
7	1	Nelson García	Venezuela	47.97	q
8	1	Raymundo Escalante	Mexico	48.06	q
9	2	Juan José Morales	Mexico	48.10	
10	1	Ronald Thorne	Barbados	49.27	
11	1	Keith Smith	United States Virgin Islands	49.58	
12	2	William Archer	British Virgin Islands	50.81	
	2	Siebert Straughan	Barbados	DNS	
	2	Jimez Ashby	United States Virgin Islands	DNS	

Final – 30 November

Rank	Name	Nationality	Time	Notes
1st place, gold medalist(s)	Roberto Hernández	Cuba	44.84	
2nd place, silver medalist(s)	Alvin Daniel	Trinidad and Tobago	45.58	
3rd place, bronze medalist(s)	Howard Burnett	Jamaica	45.86	
4	Devon Morris	Jamaica	45.96	
5	Henry Aguiar	Venezuela	46.21	
6	Héctor Herrera	Cuba	46.80	
7	Raymundo Escalante	Mexico	47.31	
8	Nelson García	Venezuela	48.59	

=== 800 metres ===
Heats – 30 December

Rank	Heat	Name	Nationality	Time	Notes
1	2	Luis Martínez	Guatemala	1:52.69	Q
2	1	Armando Rodríguez	Mexico	1:53.55	Q
3	1	Luis Karin Toledo	Mexico	1:53.99	Q
4	2	Juan Navarro	Venezuela	1:54.71	Q
5	2	Carlos Mairena	Nicaragua	1:55.14	Q
6	1	Dale Jones	Antigua and Barbuda	1:55.32	Q
7	1	Roger Miranda	Nicaragua	1:55.62	q
8	1	Lázaro Vázquez	Guatemala	1:59.19	q
9	1	Stephen Roberts	Barbados	1:59.97	
10	2	Terry Harewood	Barbados	2:04.10	
	1	Héctor Herrera	Cuba	DNS	
	2	Norberto Téllez	Cuba	DNS	

Final – 1 December

Rank	Name	Nationality	Time	Notes
1st place, gold medalist(s)	Luis Karin Toledo	Mexico	1:49.61	
2nd place, silver medalist(s)	Dale Jones	Antigua and Barbuda	1:51.18	
3rd place, bronze medalist(s)	Armando Rodríguez	Mexico	1:51.35	
4	Juan Navarro	Venezuela	1:51.37	
5	Luis Martínez	Guatemala	1:51.68	
6	Roger Miranda	Nicaragua	1:52.75	
7	Carlos Mairena	Nicaragua	1:53.52	
8	Lázaro Vázquez	Guatemala	1:58.15	

=== 1500 metres ===
29 November

Rank	Name	Nationality	Time	Notes
1st place, gold medalist(s)	Arturo Barrios	Mexico	3:45.73	
2nd place, silver medalist(s)	Mauricio Hernández	Mexico	3:45.84	
3rd place, bronze medalist(s)	José López	Venezuela	3:50.08	
4	Luis Martínez	Guatemala	3:51.55	
5	José Luis Isaac	Cuba	3:53.30	
6	Lázaro Vázquez	Guatemala	4:04.03	
7	Roger Miranda	Nicaragua	4:09.84	
8	Carlos Mairena	Nicaragua	4:22.19	
	Linton McKenzie	Jamaica	DNS	
	Dale Jones	Antigua and Barbuda	DNS	
	Amadeo Kemper	Netherlands Antilles	DNS	
	Anthony Williams	Netherlands Antilles	DNS	

=== 5000 metres ===
30 November

Rank	Name	Nationality	Time	Notes
1st place, gold medalist(s)	Arturo Barrios	Mexico	13:49.89	GR
2nd place, silver medalist(s)	Marcos Barreto	Mexico	14:04.21	
3rd place, bronze medalist(s)	Herder Vásquez	Colombia	14:18.48	
4	Domingo Demota	Dominican Republic	15:31.88	
5	Linton McKenzie	Jamaica	16:03.17	
6	Amadeo Kemper	Netherlands Antilles	16:32.97	
7	Binda Premradj	Suriname	17:14.83	
8	Marlon Williams	United States Virgin Islands	17:23.73	
9	Anthony Williams	Netherlands Antilles	17:41.23	
	Calvin Dallas	United States Virgin Islands	DNS	

=== 10,000 metres ===
28 November

Rank	Name	Nationality	Time	Notes
1st place, gold medalist(s)	Dionicio Cerón	Mexico	29:46.09	
2nd place, silver medalist(s)	Isaac García	Mexico	30:05.63	
3rd place, bronze medalist(s)	Herder Vásquez	Colombia	30:28.89	
4	Ángel Rodríguez	Cuba	32:31.35	
5	Domingo Demota	Dominican Republic	32:39.48	
6	Richard Rodriguez	Aruba	36:01.27	
7	Binda Premradj	Suriname	36:39.51	
8	Jean Dieujuste Gedeon	Haiti	36:43.44	
	Juan Linares	Cuba	DNS	
	William Aguirre	Nicaragua	DNS	
	Ignacio Cuba	Cuba	DNS	
	Amadeo Kemper	Netherlands Antilles	DNS	

=== Marathon ===
2 December

Rank	Name	Nationality	Time	Notes
1st place, gold medalist(s)	Jorge González	Puerto Rico	2:18:55	GR
2nd place, silver medalist(s)	César Mercado	Puerto Rico	2:19:40	
3rd place, bronze medalist(s)	Óscar Mejía	Venezuela	2:21:40	
4	Graciano González	Mexico	2:25:16	
5	Kimball Reynierse	Aruba	2:25:29	
6	Miguel Vargas	Costa Rica	2:27:28	
7	José Ignacio Ramírez	Colombia	2:27:40	
8	William Aguirre	Nicaragua	2:29:32	
9	Juan Amores	Costa Rica	2:30:02	
10	Julio Rosa	Dominican Republic	2:35:19	
11	Gumersindo Olmedo	Mexico	2:37:05	
	Radamés González	Cuba	DNF	
	Isidro Rico	Mexico	DNS	

=== 110 metres hurdles ===
2 December
Wind: +1.7 m/s

Rank	Name	Nationality	Time	Notes
1st place, gold medalist(s)	Emilio Valle	Cuba	13.64	
2nd place, silver medalist(s)	Alexis Sánchez	Cuba	13.94	
3rd place, bronze medalist(s)	Elvis Cedeño	Venezuela	14.18	
4	Eliexer Pulgar	Venezuela	14.42	
5	Roberto Carmona	Mexico	14.78	
6	Efraín Pedroza	Mexico	15.67	
7	Rudel Antonio	El Salvador	15.83	

=== 400 metres hurdles ===
29 November

Rank	Name	Nationality	Time	Notes
1st place, gold medalist(s)	Domingo Cordero	Puerto Rico	49.61	GR
2nd place, silver medalist(s)	Antonio Smith	Venezuela	51.32	
3rd place, bronze medalist(s)	Llimy Rivas	Colombia	52.87	
4	Wilfredo Ferrer	Venezuela	52.89	
5	Raúl Huitrón	Mexico	53.39	
6	Juan Jesús Gutiérrez	Mexico	53.76	
7	César Krings	Guatemala	54.14	
8	Winston Sinclair	Jamaica	55.86	

=== 3000 metres steeplechase ===
2 December

Rank	Name	Nationality	Time	Notes
1st place, gold medalist(s)	Germán Silva	Mexico	9:01.26	
2nd place, silver medalist(s)	Adalberto Vélez	Mexico	9:01.60	
3rd place, bronze medalist(s)	Ángel Rodríguez	Cuba	9:14.60	
4	Juan Antonio Conde	Cuba	9:22.69	

=== 4 × 100 metres relay ===
30 November

Rank	Team	Name	Time	Notes
1st place, gold medalist(s)	Cuba	Andrés Simón, Leandro Peñalver, Félix Stevens, Joel Isasi	39.09	
2nd place, silver medalist(s)	Puerto Rico	Félix Molina, Domingo Cordero, Edgardo Guilbe, Elmer Williams	39.81	
3rd place, bronze medalist(s)	Venezuela	Elvis Cedeño, Eliexer Pulgar, Henry Aguiar, Edgar Chourio	40.65	
4	Barbados	Wayde Payne, Henrico Atkins, Ronald Boyce, Eversley Bradshaw	40.66	
5	Dominican Republic	Juan Navarro, Manuel Gonel, Carlos García, Radames Sánchez	41.58	
	Jamaica	Wayne Watson, Andrew Smith, John Mair, Evon Clarke	DQ	
	Mexico	Jaime López, Eduardo Nava, Herman Adam, Raymundo Escalante	DQ	

=== 4 × 400 metres relay ===
30 November

Rank	Team	Name	Time	Notes
1st place, gold medalist(s)	Jamaica	Terrence McCrae, Evon Clarke, Howard Burnett, Devon Morris	3:05.22	
2nd place, silver medalist(s)	Barbados	Terry Harewood, Ronald Thorne, Stephen Roberts, Seibert Straughan	3:05.48	
3rd place, bronze medalist(s)	Cuba	Leandro Peñalver, Emilio Valle, Héctor Herrera, Lázaro Martínez	3:06.17	
4	Mexico	Raymundo Escalante, Juan José Morales, Eduardo Nava, Luis Karin Toledo	3:06.21	
5	Venezuela	Henry Aguiar, Antonio Smith, Wilfredo Ferrer, Nelson García	3:12.44	
	Dominican Republic		DNS	
	Puerto Rico		DNS	

=== 20 kilometres walk ===
28 November

Rank	Name	Nationality	Time	Notes
1st place, gold medalist(s)	Ernesto Canto	Mexico	1:23:52	GR
2nd place, silver medalist(s)	Carlos Mercenario	Mexico	1:24:03	
3rd place, bronze medalist(s)	Héctor Moreno	Colombia	1:24:54	
4	Julio Urías	Guatemala	1:39:51	
	Orlando Díaz	Colombia	DNF	

=== 50 kilometres walk ===
1 December

Rank	Name	Nationality	Time	Notes
1st place, gold medalist(s)	Héctor Moreno	Colombia	4:06:04	
2nd place, silver medalist(s)	Edel Oliva	Cuba	4:10:19	
3rd place, bronze medalist(s)	Orlando Díaz	Colombia	4:15:45	
4	José Víctor Alonzo	Guatemala	4:39:07	
5	Nelson Funes	Guatemala	4:48:10	
	Daniel García	Mexico	DQ	
	Francisco Reyes	Mexico	DNF	
	Martín Bermúdez	Mexico	DNF	

=== High jump ===
2 December

Rank	Name	Nationality	1.90	1.95	2.00	2.05	2.08	2.11	2.14	2.17	2.20	2.22	2.24	2.26	2.28	2.30	2.32	2.34	2.40	Result	Notes
1st place, gold medalist(s)	Javier Sotomayor	Cuba	–	–	–	–	–	–	–	o	–	xo	–	o	–	o	o	o	xxx	2.34	GR
2nd place, silver medalist(s)	Marino Drake	Cuba	–	–	–	–	o	–	o	o	xo	–	o	–	o	xxo	xo	xxx		2.32	
3rd place, bronze medalist(s)	Carlos Arzuaga	Puerto Rico	–	o	–	xo	o	o	o	xo	x									2.17	
4	Alejandro Pliego	Mexico	–	–	o	o	o	xo	xxx											2.11	
5	Karl Scatliffe	British Virgin Islands	–	o	xo	o	o	xxx												2.08	
6	Luis Ramírez	Mexico	o	o	xxx															1.95	

=== Pole vault ===
1 December

Rank	Name	Nationality	4.85	4.90	5.00	5.05	5.10	5.15	5.20	5.26	5.30	5.35	5.40	5.50	5.51	Result	Notes
1st place, gold medalist(s)	Ángel García	Cuba	–	–	xo	–	o	–	o	–	xxo	o	o	x–	xx	5.40	GR
2nd place, silver medalist(s)	Miguel Berrío	Cuba	–	–	o	–	xo	–	o	o	–	x–	xx			5.26	
3rd place, bronze medalist(s)	Konstantín Zagustín	Venezuela	–	–	xo	–	o	–	xxx							5.10	
4	Edgar Díaz	Puerto Rico	xxo	–	–	o	–	xxx								5.05	
5	Efrem Meléndez	Puerto Rico	–	xxo	–	xxx										4.90	
6	Miguel Escoto	Mexico	xo	–	xxx											4.85	
	Guillermo Salgado	Mexico	xxx													NM	

=== Long jump ===
30 November

Rank	Name	Nationality	#1	#2	#3	#4	#5	#6	Result	Notes
1st place, gold medalist(s)	Juan Felipe Ortiz	Cuba	x	7.66	8.17	7.83	x	x	8.17	
2nd place, silver medalist(s)	Jaime Jefferson	Cuba	7.88w	8.02	x	8.06	8.06	8.05	8.06	
3rd place, bronze medalist(s)	Darío Ruiz	Mexico	7.53	x	x	7.51	7.74	7.95	7.95	
4	Ronald Chambers	Jamaica	7.46	7.77	7.85	7.74	7.62	7.29	7.85	
5	Elmer Williams	Puerto Rico	7.61	x	7.58	7.55	7.56	7.59	7.61	
6	Eugene Licorish	Grenada	7.51	x	7.38	7.40	7.31	x	7.51	
7	Gerardo Guevara	Mexico	7.49	7.06	x	x	6.90	x	7.49	
8	Ángel Tovar	Venezuela	x	7.40	7.30	7.08	7.14	7.14w	7.40	
9	Jimmy Ávila	Panama	6.70	7.31	x				7.31	
10	Wendell Williams	Trinidad and Tobago	6.98w	7.21	7.28				7.28	
11	Anselm James	Trinidad and Tobago	x	7.04	7.12				7.12	
12	Gustavo Ruiz	Guatemala	5.97	6.09	x				6.09	

=== Triple jump ===
2 December

Rank	Name	Nationality	#1	#2	#3	#4	#5	#6	Result	Notes
1st place, gold medalist(s)	Lázaro Betancourt	Cuba	16.36	16.49	x	16.61	16.66	16.49	16.66	
2nd place, silver medalist(s)	Juan Miguel López	Cuba	16.18	15.97	12.55	16.50	x	16.32	16.50	
3rd place, bronze medalist(s)	Sergio Saavedra	Venezuela	x	15.39	x	15.77	x	16.18	16.18	
4	Francisco Olivares	Mexico	15.91	16.14	15.98	16.08	16.05	13.95	16.14	
5	Félix Molina	Puerto Rico	15.94	16.01	x	x	15.62	x	16.01	
6	Edward Cruden	Suriname	15.69	x	15.60	15.60	15.62	15.69	15.69	
7	Gerardo Guevara	Mexico	x	x	15.05	x	x	x	15.05	
8	Alejandro Lara	Nicaragua	x	x	14.03	x	x	14.36	14.36	
	Eugene Licorish	Grenada							DNS	

=== Shot put ===
1 December

Rank	Name	Nationality	#1	#2	#3	#4	#5	#6	Result	Notes
1st place, gold medalist(s)	Paul Ruiz	Cuba	18.93	x	x	x	x	x	18.93	
2nd place, silver medalist(s)	Marciso Boué	Cuba	18.01	18.26	x	x	17.76	x	18.26	
3rd place, bronze medalist(s)	Samuel Crespo	Puerto Rico	16.07	16.14	16.13	x	16.60	16.36	16.60	
4	Francisco Ball	Puerto Rico	x	15.69	16.15	15.61	x	16.32	16.32	
5	Hubert Maingot	Trinidad and Tobago	16.10	x	15.90	x	15.78	x	16.10	
6	Jaime Comandari	El Salvador	14.72	14.58	x	15.06	14.59	x	15.06	
7	Carlos Rodríguez	Mexico	x	14.14	14.64	15.00	14.61	x	15.00	
8	José Pedro Flores	Mexico	12.71	x	x	12.71	12.85	13.09	13.09	
	Eugene Licorish	Grenada							DNS	
	James Dedier	Trinidad and Tobago							DNS	

=== Discus throw ===
28 November

Rank	Name	Nationality	#1	#2	#3	#4	#5	#6	Result	Notes
1st place, gold medalist(s)	Roberto Moya	Cuba	62.14	64.64	61.18	x	x	x	64.64	
2nd place, silver medalist(s)	Gabriel Pedroso	Cuba	58.74	56.78	59.44	x	x	x	59.44	
3rd place, bronze medalist(s)	James Dedier	Trinidad and Tobago	51.62	51.34	51.64	49.90	53.40	52.24	53.40	
4	Eulogio Cruz	Dominican Republic	50.58	x	52.02	x	x	x	52.02	
5	Juan Francisco Ayala	Mexico	x	46.62	47.90	47.86	48.80	48.44	48.80	
6	Samuel Crespo	Puerto Rico	47.12	47.58	x	47.58	x	x	47.58	
7	Herbert Rodríguez	El Salvador	x	44.88	x	?	42.60	45.80	45.80	
8	Eulogio Arroyo	Mexico	42.56	40.72	x	36.90	41.50	40.52	42.56	
	Eugene Licorish	Grenada							DNS	
	Hubert Maingot	Trinidad and Tobago							DNS	

=== Hammer throw ===
1 December

Rank	Name	Nationality	#1	#2	#3	#4	#5	#6	Result	Notes
1st place, gold medalist(s)	Eladio Hernández	Cuba	67.96	68.24	70.74	x	x	x	70.74	GR
2nd place, silver medalist(s)	Guillermo Guzmán	Mexico	66.88	68.06	67.56	65.98	64.42	68.18	68.18	
3rd place, bronze medalist(s)	René Díaz	Cuba	x	x	64.54	66.62	x	63.96	66.62	
4	David Castrillón	Colombia	x	57.12	x	56.02	x	58.94	58.94	
5	Fernando Wilson	Dominican Republic	x	x	55.26	54.62	x	x	55.26	
6	Daniel Marcial	Mexico	x	46.46	x	x	45.94	47.20	47.20	

=== Javelin throw ===
29 November

Rank	Name	Nationality	#1	#2	#3	#4	#5	#6	Result	Notes
1st place, gold medalist(s)	Ramón González	Cuba	75.20	70.96	76.96	78.86	75.46	78.50	78.86	GR
2nd place, silver medalist(s)	Juan de la Garza	Mexico	72.52	76.60	x	x	64.10	76.54	76.60	
3rd place, bronze medalist(s)	Kirt Thompson	Trinidad and Tobago	70.84	68.54	x	69.50	72.64	75.38	75.38	
4	Luis Lucumí	Colombia	x	x	71.38	70.52	68.92	74.82	74.82	
5	Héctor Duarte	Cuba	72.34	70.30	71.40	x	x	74.20	74.20	
6	Trevor Modeste	Grenada	68.12	65.54	65.32	67.56	61.88	64.00	68.12	
7	Leobardo Vaal	Mexico	66.22	x	62.58	60.38	x	65.66	66.22	
8	Paul Huriston	Cayman Islands	63.72	64.06	59.20	56.62	60.34	x	64.06	
9	Daniel Alonso	Dominican Republic	60.04	58.42	63.50				63.50	
10	Rigoberto Calderón	Nicaragua	58.74	55.64	59.24				59.24	
11	Kenneth Lucas	Aruba	52.48	53.20	x				53.20	
	Eugene Licorish	Grenada							DNS	

=== Decathlon ===
28–29 November

The highest mark recorded in each event is highlighted in yellow

Rank	Athlete	Nationality	100m	LJ	SP	HJ	400m	110m H	DT	PV	JT	1500m	Points	Notes
1st place, gold medalist(s)	Miguel Valle	Cuba	10.87	7.38	14.31	1.91	50.18	14.49	37.33	4.20	57.46	5:14.09	7448	
2nd place, silver medalist(s)	Ernesto Betancourt	Cuba	11.21	6.63	14.24	2.03	50.10	15.67	42.06	3.90	63.09	5:10.51	7278	
3rd place, bronze medalist(s)	Antonio Greene	Bahamas	10.92	7.24	13.53	2.03	50.16	15.38	43.72	3.35	56.30	5:38.45	7118	
4	Jorge Camacho	Mexico	11.20	6.63	11.27	1.91	49.39	16.15	30.36	NM	36.96	4:55.50	6003	
5	José Román	Puerto Rico	11.71	6.73	12.76	1.88	53.31	16.18	39.56	NM	44.60	5:39.97	5711	
6	Sergio Ontiveros	Mexico	11.52	6.39	10.95	1.82	52.21	16.81	35.34	4.10	NM	5:17.18	5648	
	Reynaldo Guerrero	Dominican Republic	11.53	6.19	11.42	1.79	52.20	15.45	35.36	NM	DNS	–	DNS	

== Women's results ==
=== 100 metres ===
Heats – 28 November
Wind:
Heat 1: +1.5 m/s, Heat 2: +0.6 m/s

Rank	Heat	Name	Nationality	Time	Notes
1	2	Liliana Allen	Cuba	11.22	Q
2	2	Heather Samuel	Antigua and Barbuda	11.63	Q
3	2	Alejandra Quiñónes	Colombia	11.71	Q
4	1	Zoila Stewart	Costa Rica	11.85	Q
5	1	Guadalupe García	Mexico	11.88	Q
6	1	Julia Duporty	Cuba	11.89	Q
7	1	Layphane Carnegie	Jamaica	11.96	q
8	2	Alma Vázquez	Mexico	12.00	q
9	1	Jacqueline Sophia	Netherlands Antilles	12.14	
10	1	Natalee Felicia	Netherlands Antilles	12.30	
11	2	Amrei Baumgarten	Guatemala	12.82	

Final – 29 November

Wind: +3.2 m/s

Rank	Name	Nationality	Time	Notes
1st place, gold medalist(s)	Liliana Allen	Cuba	11.33	
2nd place, silver medalist(s)	Heather Samuel	Antigua and Barbuda	11.73	
3rd place, bronze medalist(s)	Alejandra Quiñónes	Colombia	11.86	
4	Layphane Carnegie	Jamaica	11.89	
5	Alma Vázquez	Mexico	11.92	
6	Julia Duporty	Cuba	11.99	
7	Guadalupe García	Mexico	12.01	
8	Zoila Stewart	Costa Rica	12.05	

=== 200 metres ===
Heats – 30 November
Wind:
Heat 1: +1.4 m/s, Heat 2: +1.3 m/s

Rank	Heat	Name	Nationality	Time	Notes
1	2	Liliana Allen	Cuba	23.67	Q
2	1	Norfalia Carabalí	Colombia	23.77	Q
3	1	Zoila Stewart	Costa Rica	24.23	Q
4	2	Heather Samuel	Antigua and Barbuda	24.27	Q
5	1	Layphane Carnegie	Jamaica	24.28	Q
6	1	Alma Vázquez	Mexico	24.32	q
7	2	Guadalupe García	Mexico	24.35	Q
8	1	Jacqueline Sophia	Netherlands Antilles	24.39	q
9	2	Soraima Martha	Netherlands Antilles	25.29	
10	2	Gail Prescod	Saint Vincent and the Grenadines	25.56	
11	2	Amrei Baumgarten	Guatemala	26.36	
	1	Bernice Gálvez	Belize	DNS	
	2	Ximena Restrepo	Colombia	DNS	

Final – 1 December

Wind: -1.2 m/s

Rank	Name	Nationality	Time	Notes
1st place, gold medalist(s)	Liliana Allen	Cuba	23.27	
2nd place, silver medalist(s)	Norfalia Carabalí	Colombia	23.75	
3rd place, bronze medalist(s)	Heather Samuel	Antigua and Barbuda	24.33	
4	Alma Vázquez	Mexico	24.47	
5	Zoila Stewart	Costa Rica	24.49	
6	Guadalupe García	Mexico	24.68	
7	Jacqueline Sophia	Netherlands Antilles	24.71	
8	Layphane Carnegie	Jamaica	24.74	

=== 400 metres ===
30 November

Rank	Name	Nationality	Time	Notes
1st place, gold medalist(s)	Ana Fidelia Quirot	Cuba	51.70	
2nd place, silver medalist(s)	Norfalia Carabalí	Colombia	52.57	
3rd place, bronze medalist(s)	Nancy McLeón	Cuba	55.29	
4	Erendira Villagómez	Mexico	56.37	
5	Shermaine Ross	Grenada	56.53	
6	Blanca de Santiago	Mexico	57.35	
7	Gail Prescod	Saint Vincent and the Grenadines	1:04.47	
8	Bernice Gálvez	Belize	1:05.96	

=== 800 metres ===
Heats – 30 November

Rank	Heat	Name	Nationality	Time	Notes
1	2	Letitia Vriesde	Suriname	2:13.65	Q
2	1	Ana Fidelia Quirot	Cuba	2:15.39	Q
3	1	Irma Torres	Mexico	2:15.61	Q
4	1	Alma Jiménez	Guatemala	2:16.30	Q
5	2	Daisy Ocasio	Puerto Rico	2:16.43	Q
6	1	Sonia Escalera	Puerto Rico	2:17.43	q
6	2	Jennifer Fisher	Bermuda	2:17.43	Q
8	2	Bigna Samuel	Saint Vincent and the Grenadines	2:19.21	q
9	2	María de la Paz Gomora	Mexico	2:19.26	

Final – 1 December

Rank	Name	Nationality	Time	Notes
1st place, gold medalist(s)	Ana Fidelia Quirot	Cuba	2:04.85	
2nd place, silver medalist(s)	Letitia Vriesde	Suriname	2:04.97	
3rd place, bronze medalist(s)	Jennifer Fisher	Bermuda	2:09.52	
4	Irma Torres	Mexico	2:12.45	
5	Alma Jiménez	Guatemala	2:16.68	
6	Sonia Escalera	Puerto Rico	2:17.65	
7	Daisy Ocasio	Puerto Rico	2:20.26	
8	Bigna Samuel	Saint Vincent and the Grenadines	2:23.14	

=== 1500 metres ===
2 December

Rank	Name	Nationality	Time	Notes
1st place, gold medalist(s)	Letitia Vriesde	Suriname	4:26.28	
2nd place, silver medalist(s)	María Luisa Servín	Mexico	4:29.03	
3rd place, bronze medalist(s)	Jennifer Fisher	Bermuda	4:57.25	
4	Bigna Samuel	Saint Vincent and the Grenadines	4:58.67	
5	Aura Morales	Guatemala	5:04.70	
6	Esther Merino	Mexico	5:07.60	
	Vilma Peña	Costa Rica	DNS	
	Milagros Rodríguez	Cuba	DNS	

=== 3000 metres ===
1 December

Rank	Name	Nationality	Time	Notes
1st place, gold medalist(s)	María del Carmen Díaz	Mexico	9:30.09	GR
2nd place, silver medalist(s)	María Luisa Servín	Mexico	9:38.08	
3rd place, bronze medalist(s)	Vilma Peña	Costa Rica	10:37.00	
4	Gilda Méndez	Panama	11:11.75	
5	Anna Eatherly	Bermuda	11:14.19	
6	Aura Morales	Guatemala	11:14.47	
7	Milagros Rodríguez	Cuba	11:37.08	
8	Gloria Guerra	Panama	11:46.28	

=== 10,000 metres ===
29 November

Rank	Name	Nationality	Time	Notes
1st place, gold medalist(s)	María del Carmen Díaz	Mexico	35:27.68	GR
2nd place, silver medalist(s)	Santa Velázquez	Mexico	35:53.36	
3rd place, bronze medalist(s)	Vilma Peña	Costa Rica	37:32.53	
4	Carmen Fernández	Venezuela	37:54.36	
5	Emperatriz Wilson	Cuba	39:28.91	
6	Gilda Méndez	Panama	39:55.71	
7	Gloria Guerra	Panama	40:38.49	

=== Marathon ===
2 December

Rank	Name	Nationality	Time	Notes
1st place, gold medalist(s)	María Flora Moreno	Mexico	2:47:38	GR
2nd place, silver medalist(s)	Marisol Vargas	Mexico	2:50:25	
3rd place, bronze medalist(s)	Maribel Durruty	Cuba	2:50:41	
4	Mónica Silviria	Venezuela	2:53:50	
5	Emperatriz Wilson	Cuba	2:54:54	
6	Cornelia Melis	Aruba	3:07:38	
7	Naydi Nazario	Puerto Rico	3:08:37	
	Carmen Serrano	Puerto Rico	DNF	
	Uvilma Ruiz	Venezuela	DNF	
	María Elena Reyna	Mexico	DNS	

=== 100 metres hurdles ===
2 December
Wind: +1.0 m/s

Rank	Name	Nationality	Time	Notes
1st place, gold medalist(s)	Aliuska López	Cuba	12.94	
2nd place, silver medalist(s)	Odalys Adams	Cuba	13.26	
3rd place, bronze medalist(s)	Sandra Taváres	Mexico	13.68	
4	Arlene Phillips	Venezuela	13.99	
5	Gisela Heckel	Mexico	14.98	
6	Aida Boesche	Guatemala	15.76	
	Ana Regina Quiñónez	Guatemala	DNS	

=== 400 metres hurdles ===
29 November

Rank	Name	Nationality	Time	Notes
1st place, gold medalist(s)	Elsa Jiménez	Cuba	57.59	
2nd place, silver medalist(s)	Maribelsy Peña	Colombia	59.06	
3rd place, bronze medalist(s)	Tania Fernández	Cuba	59.55	
4	Alejandra Quintanar	Mexico	1:02.32	
5	Alma Jiménez	Guatemala	1:02.91	
6	Catalina Segura	Mexico	1:04.73	
7	Arlene Phillips	Venezuela	1:19.98	
	Walesica Ramos	Puerto Rico	DNS	

=== 4 × 100 metres relay ===
30 November

Rank	Team	Name	Time	Notes
1st place, gold medalist(s)	Cuba	Odalys Adams, Aliuska López, Julia Duporty, Liliana Allen	44.54	
2nd place, silver medalist(s)	Colombia	Alejandra Quiñónes, Norfalia Carabalí, Ximena Restrepo, Maribelcy Peña	45.29	
3rd place, bronze medalist(s)	Mexico	Sandra Taváres, Alma Vázquez, Guadalupe García, Gabriela Romero	45.75	
4	Netherlands Antilles	Jacqueline Sophia, Soraima Martha, Natalee Felicia, Solange Ostiana	48.21	
5	Puerto Rico	Mayra Medina, Sonia Escalera, Walesica Ramos, Aurelis Acosta	48.40	
	Venezuela		DNS	

=== 4 × 400 metres relay ===
2 December

Rank	Team	Name	Time	Notes
1st place, gold medalist(s)	Cuba	Nancy McLeon, Elsa Jiménez, Julia Duporty, Ana Fidelia Quirot	3:36.27	
2nd place, silver medalist(s)	Mexico	Erendira Villagómez, Alejandra Quintanar, Rosa García, Areli Ovalle	3:44.59	
3rd place, bronze medalist(s)	Puerto Rico	Arealis Acosta, Daisy Ocasio, Sonia Escalera, Walesica Ramos	3:50.08	
	Colombia		DNS	

=== 10,000 metres walk ===
30 November

Rank	Name	Nationality	Time	Notes
1st place, gold medalist(s)	Graciela Mendoza	Mexico	49:09.45	GR
2nd place, silver medalist(s)	Maricela Chávez	Mexico	50:49.55	
3rd place, bronze medalist(s)	Liliana Bermeo	Colombia	51:33.27	
4	María Magdalena Guzmán	El Salvador	59:52.21	
	Gloria Moreno	Colombia	DNS	

=== High jump ===
29 November

Rank	Name	Nationality	1.55	1.60	1.65	1.70	1.73	1.76	1.79	1.82	1.85	1.87	1.91	Result	Notes
1st place, gold medalist(s)	María del Carmen García	Cuba	–	–	–	o	–	o	o	o	xo	xo	xxx	1.87	
2nd place, silver medalist(s)	Silvia Costa	Cuba	–	–	–	–	o	xo	o	xo	xx–	x		1.82	
3rd place, bronze medalist(s)	Cristina Fink	Mexico	–	–	–	o	o	o	xo	xxx				1.79	
4	Najuma Fletcher	Guyana	o	–	o	xxo	xxo	o	xxx					1.76	
5	Ana Regina Quiñónes	Guatemala	o	o	xo	o	xxx							1.70	
6	Paula Burchall	Bermuda	–	o	xo	xxx								1.65	
7	Gisela Heckel	Mexico	o	o	xxx									1.60	

=== Long jump ===
28 November

Rank	Name	Nationality	#1	#2	#3	#4	#5	#6	Result	Notes
1st place, gold medalist(s)	Niurka Montalvo	Cuba	6.21w	6.58	6.36	x	x	x	6.58	
2nd place, silver medalist(s)	Eloína Echevarría	Cuba	6.24	x	x	x	6.40	6.30	6.40w	
3rd place, bronze medalist(s)	Euphemia Huggins	Trinidad and Tobago	6.04	6.39	6.33	6.29w	6.34	6.39	6.39	
4	María Emilia Lenk	Mexico	5.83w	5.64	5.67	x	x	x	5.83w	
5	Solange Ostiana	Netherlands Antilles	5.63w	5.29	5.46	5.61w	4.81	5.05	5.63w	
6	Yvette Haynes	Saint Vincent and the Grenadines	x	5.51w	4.68	x	5.20	5.48	5.51w	
7	Georgina Obeso	Mexico	5.04w	x	x	5.46	x	x	5.46	
	Mayra Medina	Puerto Rico							DNS	
	Madeline de Jesús	Puerto Rico							DNS	

=== Shot put ===
29 November

Rank	Name	Nationality	#1	#2	#3	#4	#5	#6	Result	Notes
1st place, gold medalist(s)	Belsis Laza	Cuba	17.62	17.59	17.73	x	x	x	17.73	
2nd place, silver medalist(s)	Herminia Fernández	Cuba	x	x	x	15.93	15.70	16.36	16.36	
3rd place, bronze medalist(s)	María Isabel Urrutia	Colombia	15.57	15.94	16.06	14.97	15.39	16.09	16.09	
4	Lilián Rivera	Puerto Rico	13.10	13.85	13.32	x	12.72	13.99	13.99	
5	Angélica Roux	Mexico	11.47	12.15	12.02	12.22	x	12.58	12.58	
6	María del Carmen Rodríguez	Mexico	11.80	12.34	12.07	12.22	x	12.03	12.34	
7	María Lourdes Ruiz	Nicaragua	11.31	11.41	11.03	10.99	10.84	11.10	11.41	
8	Verónica Monzón	Guatemala	10.72	10.46	10.47	10.98	10.45	10.30	10.98	

=== Discus throw ===
2 December

Rank	Name	Nationality	#1	#2	#3	#4	#5	#6	Result	Notes
1st place, gold medalist(s)	Bárbara Hechevarría	Cuba	58.62	x	56.49	x	57.04	58.00	58.62	
2nd place, silver medalist(s)	Olga Gómez	Cuba	54.16	54.48	x	x	x	56.06	56.06	
3rd place, bronze medalist(s)	María Isabel Urrutia	Colombia	53.60	53.44	52.66	53.84	53.18	52.46	53.84	
4	Lilián Rivera	Puerto Rico	x	48.56	44.88	x	47.48	47.92	48.56	
5	María Lourdes Ruiz	Nicaragua	x	41.74	42.66	43.10	x	38.78	43.10	
6	Laura Aguiñaga	Mexico	x	40.20	40.40	41.58	40.44	x	41.58	
7	Claudia Becerril	Mexico	x	x	41.40	x	40.86	x	41.40	
8	Verónica Monzón	Guatemala	28.30	27.96	32.38	30.88	30.72	31.00	32.38	

=== Javelin throw ===
30 November

Rank	Name	Nationality	#1	#2	#3	#4	#5	#6	Result	Notes
1st place, gold medalist(s)	Herminia Bouza	Cuba	x	54.06	57.74	x	x	x	57.74	
2nd place, silver medalist(s)	María Caridad Colón	Cuba	x	x	x	x	55.86	x	55.86	
3rd place, bronze medalist(s)	Marieta Riera	Venezuela	x	x	x	x	50.01	51.86	51.86	
4	Terry-Lynn Paynter	Bermuda	48.16	50.20	44.52	x	x	48.18	50.20	
5	Martha Blanco	Mexico	45.58	43.34	x	44.22	x	x	45.58	
	Nohemí Romo	Mexico	x	x	x	x	x	x	NM	
	Lilián Rivera	Puerto Rico							DNS	

=== Heptathlon ===
30 November – 1 December

The highest mark recorded in each event is highlighted in yellow

Rank	Name	Nationality	100m H	HJ	SP	200m	LJ	JT	800m	Points	Notes
1st place, gold medalist(s)	Zorobabelia Córdoba	Colombia	14.68	1.64	13.24	25.14	5.95	48.84	2:30.13	5647	GR
2nd place, silver medalist(s)	Magalys García	Cuba	14.38	1.61	11.56	25.16	5.55	51.98	2:26.43	5528	
3rd place, bronze medalist(s)	Laiza Carrillo	Cuba	14.28	1.70	11.68	25.35	6.10	37.42	2:26.93	5519	
4	Rita Solís	Mexico	16.03	1.64	11.46	26.92	5.30	37.38	2:40.50	4664	
5	Larissa Soto	Guatemala	16.02	1.52	8.59	26.07	5.06	26.42	2:26.04	4313	
6	Mayra Medina	Puerto Rico	15.28	1.73	9.35	26.08	5.49	24.26	3:15.30	4274	
	Cristina Fink	Mexico	15.26	1.82	9.43	26.87	DNS	–	–	DNF	
