= Athletics at the 1989 Summer Universiade – Men's javelin throw =

The men's javelin throw event at the 1989 Summer Universiade was held at the Wedaustadion in Duisburg on 27 and 28 August 1989.

== Medalists ==
Gold	Silver	Bronze
Steve Backley; Great Britain	Pascal Lefèvre; France	Marko Hyytiäinen; Finland

== Results ==
=== Qualification ===
Rank	Athlete	Nationality	Result	Notes
1	Steve Backley	Great Britain	78.52	
2	Peter Blank	West Germany	78.00	
3	Marko Hyytiäinen	Finland	77.98	
4	Uwe Trinks	East Germany	75.58	
5	Pascal Lefèvre	France	75.30	
6	Ramón González	Cuba	74.98	
7	Nigel Bevan	Great Britain	74.68	
8	Peter Schreiber	West Germany	74.58	
9	Sigurður Einarsson	Iceland	74.52	
10	Mike Barnett	United States	74.08	
11	Sulev Lepik	Soviet Union	73.32	
12	Andriy Maznichenko	Soviet Union	73.18	
13	Yki Laine	Finland	72.50	
14	Kim Ki-hoon	South Korea	72.50	
15	Radoman Šćekić	Yugoslavia	72.40	
16	Fabio De Gaspari	Italy	72.30	
17	Darryl Roberson	United States	69.60	
18	Ben Hodgson	Australia	68.58	
19	Emil Tsvetanov	Bulgaria	68.40	
20	Metin Altintaş	Turkey	64.92	
21	Louis Breault	Canada	64.78	
22	Carlos Cunha	Portugal	64.16	

=== Final ===
Rank	Athlete	Nationality	#1	#2	#3	#4	#5	#6	Result	Notes
1st place, gold medalist(s)	Steve Backley	Great Britain	85.60	x	–	–	x	79.64	85.60	GR
2nd place, silver medalist(s)	Pascal Lefèvre	France							82.56	NR
3rd place, bronze medalist(s)	Marko Hyytiäinen	Finland							81.52	
4	Sigurður Einarsson	Iceland							81.42	
5	Nigel Bevan	Great Britain							79.56	
6	Peter Blank	West Germany							79.08	
7	Uwe Trinks	East Germany							78.32	
8	Peter Schreiber	West Germany							76.66	
9	Ramón González	Cuba							76.10	
10	Andriy Maznichenko	Soviet Union							75.82	
11	Mike Barnett	United States							75.24	
12	Sulev Lepik	Soviet Union							72.78	
