= Athletics at the 1998 Commonwealth Games – Men's javelin throw =

Men's javelin throw at the Commonwealth Games

The men's javelin throw event at the 1998 Commonwealth Games was held on 21 September in Kuala Lumpur.

Steve Backley failed to win a third Commonwealth Games title, losing to Marius Corbett who also broke Backley's Games record. Backley said he would use this loss as motivation for the 1999 World Championships in Athletics.

== Results ==
Rank	Name	Nationality	Result	Notes
1st place, gold medalist(s)	Marius Corbett	South Africa	88.75	CR
2nd place, silver medalist(s)	Steve Backley	England	87.38	
3rd place, bronze medalist(s)	Mick Hill	England	83.80	
4	Mark Roberson	England	80.98	
5	Andrew Currey	Australia	80.05	
6	Diggory Brooke	New Zealand	75.55	
7	James Goulding	Fiji	73.68	
8	Nigel Bevan	Wales	73.06	
9	Erin Bevans	Canada	72.37	
10	Adrian Hatcher	Australia	68.99	
11	Yazid Imran	Malaysia	62.49	
	Paul Langat	Kenya	NM	
