= Athletics at the 1990 Commonwealth Games – Men's javelin throw =

Men's javelin throw at the Commonwealth Games

The men's javelin throw event at the 1990 Commonwealth Games was held on 3 February at the Mount Smart Stadium in Auckland.

== Results ==
Rank	Name	Nationality	#1	#2	#3	#4	#5	#6	Result	Notes
1st place, gold medalist(s)	Steve Backley	England	84.90	80.70	80.80	81.32	x	86.02	86.02	GR
2nd place, silver medalist(s)	Mick Hill	England	81.32	x	81.46	81.98	80.80	83.32	83.32	
3rd place, bronze medalist(s)	Gavin Lovegrove	New Zealand							81.66	
4	Nigel Bevan	Wales	70.42						79.70	
5	Mike O'Rourke	New Zealand	x	70.68					79.00	
6	Mark Roberson	England							75.38	
7	John Stapylton-Smith	New Zealand							72.80	
8	Justin Arop	Uganda							70.74	
9	Steve Feraday	Canada							68.20	
10	Mike Mahovlich	Canada							67.80	
11	Murray Keen	Australia							65.64	
12	Christakis Telonis	Cyprus							62.36	
13	Jeffrey Dambe	Botswana							49.78	
