= Abdul Azim Al-Aliwat =

Saudi Arabian javelin thrower

Personal information
- Nationality: Saudi Arabian
- Born: 12 July 1967 (age 59)

Sport
- Sport: Athletics
- Event: Javelin throw
Medal record
Men's athletics
Representing Saudi Arabia
Arab U20 Championships
| Gold medal – first place | 1986 Cairo | Javelin throw |
Gulf Cooperation Council Championships
| Gold medal – first place | 1992 Riyadh | Javelin throw |

Abdul Azim Al-Aliwat (Arabic: عبد العظيم العليوات; born 12 July 1967) is a Saudi Arabian handball player and javelin thrower. He competed in the men's javelin throw at the 1988 Summer Olympics.

== Career ==
At the 1986 World U20 Championships javelin throw, Al-Aliwat finished 17th in the 'B' group qualification, throwing 60.98 metres. Throwing 59.30 metres, he won the gold medal in the javelin at the 1986 Arab Junior Athletics Championships ahead of Hussain Abbas.

Al-Aliwat was seeded n the 'B' qualification group at the 1988 Olympics. He threw 56.32 metres on his first attempt, which would be his best effort following 53.32 m and 49.48 m throws. He finished 19th in his group and did not advance to the finals.

At the 1992 Gulf Cooperation Council Athletics Championships in Riyadh, Al-Aliwat won the gold medal with a 66.14 metres throw. At a separate meeting in 1992, he set his personal best of 69.86 metres.

He was a national champion in the javelin, winning the Saudi Athletics Championships.

Al-Aliwat participated in masters athletics. He won a silver medal in the M55 javelin throw at the 2023 Asia Masters Athletics Championships, and was 9th at the World Masters Athletics Championships. He also competed in the shot put at a masters level.

Al-Aliwat was also an accomplished handball player. He was known as a strength player, shooting more than nine metres away from the goal. He was said to have been responsible for promoting the handball division of the Al-Noor FC to the premier league of Saudi athletics, and participated in the IHF World Men's Handball Championship.

== Personal life ==
Al-Aliwat attended King Saud University where he studied physical education. He is married with four children.

In 2016, he worked with Al-Huda Club to train their first handball team. After poor results, his contract was terminated in March 2017.

He became president of the handball division of the Al-Noor FC sports club. Al-Noor fans had hoped he could correct problems with the club. As president, he restricted the club's management to only men and excluded women.
