= Athletics at the 1991 Summer Universiade – Men's javelin throw =

The men's javelin throw event at the 1991 Summer Universiade was held at the Don Valley Stadium in Sheffield on 25 July 1991.

The winning margin was an enormous 6.82 metres which as of 2024 remains the only time the men's javelin has been won by more than 6.5 metres at these games.

== Results ==
Rank	Athlete	Nationality	#1	#2	#3	#4	#5	#6		Notes
1st place, gold medalist(s)	Steve Backley	Great Britain	87.42	83.22	–	81.62	–	x	87.42	UR
2nd place, silver medalist(s)	Vladimir Ovchinnikov	Soviet Union							80.60	
3rd place, bronze medalist(s)	Knut Hempel	Germany							77.90	
4	Nigel Bevan	Great Britain	76.38	x	77.80	x	69.40	63.82	77.80	
5	Tommi Huotilainen	Finland							76.62	
6	Fabio De Gaspari	Italy							76.16	
7	John Richardson	United States							75.12	
8	Andrey Maznichenko	Soviet Union							74.26	
9	Ed Kaminski	United States							72.16	
10	Jouni Koukkari	Finland							71.94	
11	Håvard Johansen	Norway							69.96	
12	Nick Batty	Australia							65.86	
13	Geng Shengli	China							65.86	
14	Per Jensen	Denmark							62.82	
	Naeima Khadjavi	Iran							NM	
