= 1990 World Junior Championships in Athletics – Men's javelin throw =

The men's javelin throw event at the 1990 World Junior Championships in Athletics was held in Plovdiv, Bulgaria, at Deveti Septemvri Stadium on 9 and 10 August.

== Medalists ==
Gold	Tommi Viskari; Finland
Silver	Dariusz Trafas; Poland
Bronze	Jarkko Heimonen; Finland

== Results ==
=== Final ===
10 August

Rank	Name	Nationality	Attempts						Result	Notes
Rank	Name	Nationality	1	2	3	4	5	6	Result	Notes
1st place, gold medalist(s)	Tommi Viskari	Finland	x	69.52	73.88	68.90	x	x	73.88	
2nd place, silver medalist(s)	Dariusz Trafas	Poland	72.18	68.26	72.76	x	65.28	x	72.76	
3rd place, bronze medalist(s)	Jarkko Heimonen	Finland	68.64	69.94	68.92	67.54	x	72.30	72.30	
4	Marco Badura	East Germany	71.30	70.84	65.14	64.92	68.76	x	71.30	
5	Christian Benninger	West Germany	68.20	70.32	70.80	-	x	x	70.80	
6	Kóstas Gatsioúdis	Greece	69.90	x	69.46	63.66	67.50	69.70	69.90	
7	Yasuo Nakamura	Japan	68.12	64.80	69.02	65.34	66.76	69.60	69.60	
8	Johan Helge	Sweden	x	69.18	64.38	x	x	65.14	69.18	
9	Teodor Pekarskiy	Soviet Union	x	67.60	64.06				67.60	
10	Ambrosi Matiashvili	Soviet Union	67.56	x	64.80				67.56	
11	Ireneusz Karasinski	Poland	x	x	62.00				62.00	
12	Gregory Wiesner	Switzerland	x	59.10	61.00				61.00	

=== Qualifications ===
9 Aug

==== Group A ====
Rank	Name	Nationality	Attempts			Result	Notes
Rank	Name	Nationality	1	2	3	Result	Notes
1	Jarkko Heimonen	Finland	67.44	73.42	-	73.42	Q
2	Tommi Viskari	Finland	67.00	71.32	-	71.32	Q
3	Yasuo Nakamura	Japan	65.12	65.84	70.62	70.62	Q
4	Ambrosi Matiashvili	Soviet Union	69.94	-	-	69.94	Q
5	Teodor Pekarskiy	Soviet Union	69.14	-	-	69.14	Q
6	Kóstas Gatsioúdis	Greece	64.28	68.52	-	68.52	Q
7	Ireneusz Karasinski	Poland	68.50	-	-	68.50	Q
8	Marco Badura	East Germany	68.38	-	-	68.38	Q
9	Gregory Wiesner	Switzerland	66.50	60.00	68.10	68.10	Q
10	Dariusz Trafas	Poland	x	67.46	62.68	67.46	q
11	Christian Benninger	West Germany	67.44	66.44	65.98	67.44	q
12	Johan Helge	Sweden	61.26	x	67.10	67.10	q
13	Joakim Nilsson	Sweden	66.94	x	62.04	66.94	
14	Leonardo Vaal	Mexico	65.08	66.22	59.86	66.22	
15	Andreas Pollandt	East Germany	64.74	64.60	65.96	65.96	
16	József Szabó	Hungary	65.74	63.74	64.78	65.74	
17	Satbir Singh Saran	India	57.46	61.50	63.98	63.98	
18	Daniele Ferazzuto	Italy	63.78	63.08	60.78	63.78	
19	Andrew Currey	Australia	61.58	63.66	62.54	63.66	
20	Andrej Babić	Yugoslavia	60.60	61.02	63.60	63.60	
21	Erik Smith	United States	x	63.56	61.68	63.56	
22	Chad McKinney	United States	62.56	60.34	x	62.56	
23	Martin Saunders	Australia	58.58	53.56	62.52	62.52	
24	Asen Valev	Bulgaria	x	61.24	56.74	61.24	
25	Pedro Claure	Chile	60.70	58.66	58.72	60.70	

== Participation ==
According to an unofficial count, 25 athletes from 18 countries participated in the event.

- Australia (2)
- Bulgaria (1)
- Chile (1)
- East Germany (2)
- Finland (2)
- Greece (1)
- Hungary (1)
- India (1)
- Italy (1)
- Japan (1)
- Mexico (1)
- Poland (2)
- Soviet Union (2)
- Sweden (2)
- Switzerland (1)
- United States (2)
- West Germany (1)
- Yugoslavia (1)
