= Andrew Currey =

Australian javelin thrower

Personal information
- Nationality: Australian
- Born: 7 February 1971 (age 55) Wee Waa, New South Wales, Australia
- Height: 185 cm (6 ft 1 in)
- Weight: 95 kg (209 lb)

Sport
- Sport: Athletics
- Event: javelin throw
- Club: Illawarra Blue Stars

Andrew Bruce Currey (born 7 February 1971) is a retired javelin thrower from Australia, who was the nation's leading javelin specialist in the 1990s. His main rival was training partner Adrian Hatcher.

Currey represented his native country twice at the Summer Olympics, in 1996 and 2000. He won a total number of nine Australian titles in the men's javelin throw.

Currey finished third behind Colin Mackenzie and Mark Roberson in the javelin throw event at the British 1993 AAA Championships.

He is married to Louise McPaul.

== Seasonal bests by year ==
- 1993 - 80.12
- 1995 - 81.54
- 1996 - 77.28
- 1997 - 79.64
- 1998 - 85.75
- 1999 - 83.88
- 2000 - 85.28
- 2001 - 86.67
- 2002 - 85.69
- 2003 - 82.29
- 2004 - 72.94

== Achievements ==
Year	Competition	Venue	Position	Notes
Representing Australia
1990	World Junior Championships	Plovdiv, Bulgaria	19th (q)	63.66 m
1993	World Championships	Stuttgart, Germany	44th (q)	66.72 m
1994	Commonwealth Games	Victoria, Canada	6th	74.88 m
1995	World Championships	Gothenburg, Sweden	16th (q)	76.84 m
1996	Olympic Games	Atlanta, United States	21st (q)	77.28 m
1998	Goodwill Games	Uniondale, United States	3rd	78.50 m
1998	Commonwealth Games	Kuala Lumpur, Malaysia	5th	80.05 m
1999	World Championships	Seville, Spain	21st (q)	75.34 m
2000	Olympic Games	Sydney, Australia	22nd (q)	78.12 m
2001	Goodwill Games	Brisbane, Australia	6th	81.44 m
2002	Commonwealth Games	Manchester, United Kingdom	5th	76.98 m
