= Athletics at the 1995 Pan American Games – Men's javelin throw =

Men's javelin throw at the Pan American Games

The men's javelin throw event at the 1995 Pan American Games was held at the Estadio Atletico "Justo Roman" on 21 March.

== Results ==
Rank	Name	Nationality	#1	#2	#3	#4	#5	#6	Result	Notes
1st place, gold medalist(s)	Emeterio González	Cuba	x	78.16	76.28	78.32	79.28	x	79.28	
2nd place, silver medalist(s)	Edgar Baumann	Paraguay	x	78.70	69.28	–	70.96	73.22	78.70	
3rd place, bronze medalist(s)	Todd Riech	United States	77.34	77.82	x	69.88	73.56	75.98	77.82	
4	Ovidio Trimiño	Cuba	76.76	73.10	71.64	71.68	71.52	68.82	76.76	
5	Rodrigo Zelaya	Chile	74.18	x	73.46	x	72.06	69.40	74.18	
6	Ed Kaminski	United States	69.78	69.70	70.48	x	71.42	72.30	72.30	
7	Rigoberto Calderón	Nicaragua	68.22	x	x	x	69.58	68.28	69.58	
8	Mauricio Silva	Argentina	63.98	65.68	65.60	65.18	63.24	x	65.68	
9	Nery Kennedy	Paraguay	64.02	62.92	62.18				64.02	
10	Joel Hamilton	Dominica	56.58	60.00	x				60.00	
11	Selwyn Smith	Grenada	52.72	58.84	59.14				59.14	
	Juan de la Garza	Mexico							DNS	
