= Athletics at the 1985 Summer Universiade – Men's javelin throw =

The men's javelin throw event at the 1985 Summer Universiade was held at the Kobe Universiade Memorial Stadium in Kobe on 1 and 2 September 1985. It was the last time the old model javelin was used by men at the Games.

== Medalists ==
Gold	Silver	Bronze
Dumitru Negoiță; Romania	Wolfram Gambke; West Germany	Jean-Paul Lakafia; France

== Results ==
=== Qualification ===
Rank	Group	Athlete	Nationality	Result	Notes
1	?	Sejad Krdžalić	Yugoslavia	79.76	
2	?	Wolfram Gambke	West Germany	79.38	
3	?	Jean-Paul Lakafia	France	79.16	
4	?	Kazuhiro Mizoguchi	Japan	78.92	
5	?	Dumitru Negoiţă	Romania	77.50	
6	?	Mike Mahovlich	Canada	77.20	
7	?	Ramon González	Cuba	76.86	
8	?	Fabio Michielon	Italy	74.44	
9	?	Aleksey Gritskevich	Soviet Union	74.16	
10	?	Carlos Cunha	Portugal	73.58	
11	?	Michael Collins	United States	72.94	
12	?	Peter Blank	West Germany	71.12	
13	?	Craig Christianson	United States	71.08	
14	?	Zhao Ming	China	69.80	
15	?	Masaji Okada	Japan	67.76	
16	?	Mike Brennan	Canada	62.06	
17	?	Erastus Mogoa	Kenya	57.98	
18	?	Ariful Hoque	Bangladesh	52.90	

=== Final ===
Rank	Athlete	Nationality	Result	Notes
1st place, gold medalist(s)	Dumitru Negoiţă	Romania	84.62	
2nd place, silver medalist(s)	Wolfram Gambke	West Germany	84.46	
3rd place, bronze medalist(s)	Jean-Paul Lakafia	France	82.96	
4	Sejad Krdžalić	Yugoslavia	82.24	
5	Ramon González	Cuba	82.16	
6	Kazuhiro Mizoguchi	Japan	81.14	
7	Aleksey Gritskevich	Soviet Union	78.92	
8	Mike Mahovlich	Canada	78.02	
9	Michael Collins	United States	75.92	
10	Peter Blank	West Germany	71.80	
11	Fabio Michielon	Italy	68.58	
12	Carlos Cunha	Portugal	68.26	
