= 1986 World Junior Championships in Athletics – Men's javelin throw =

The men's javelin throw event at the 1986 World Junior Championships in Athletics was held in Athens, Greece, at Olympic Stadium on 17 and 18 July.

== Medalists ==
Gold	Vladimir Sasimovich; Soviet Union
Silver	Mark Roberson; United Kingdom
Bronze	Gavin Lovegrove; New Zealand

== Results ==
=== Final ===
18 July

Rank	Name	Nationality	Result	Notes
1st place, gold medalist(s)	Vladimir Sasimovich	Soviet Union	78.84	
2nd place, silver medalist(s)	Mark Roberson	United Kingdom	74.24	
3rd place, bronze medalist(s)	Gavin Lovegrove	New Zealand	74.22	
4	Uwe Ludwig	East Germany	73.68	
5	Kimmo Kinnunen	Finland	70.96	
6	Juan Oxamendi	Cuba	70.96	
7	Gary Jenson	United Kingdom	69.96	
8	Patrik Bodén	Sweden	69.62	
9	Arnis Shimkus	Soviet Union	68.62	
10	Kim Jae-Sang	South Korea	67.34	
11	Mirosław Witek	Poland	65.24	
12	Alain Storaci	France	64.94	

=== Qualifications ===
17 Jul

==== Group A ====
Rank	Name	Nationality	Result	Notes
1	Uwe Ludwig	East Germany	71.50	Q
2	Kimmo Kinnunen	Finland	70.18	Q
3	Gary Jenson	United Kingdom	67.64	Q
4	Arnis Shimkus	Soviet Union	66.56	Q
5	José Luis Hernández	Cuba	66.06	
6	Milan Stjepovic	Yugoslavia	64.44	
7	Valentin Jula	Romania	62.96	
8	Stefan Petersson	Sweden	62.46	
9	Eric Schoenborn	United States	62.44	
10	Markus Galanski	West Germany	61.26	
11	Christophe Laudat	France	60.94	
12	Shingo Ogino	Japan	60.18	
13	Amadou Bangoura	Senegal	59.54	
14	Panagiotis Lambrianides	Cyprus	59.10	
15	Graham Morfitt	Canada	56.40	
16	Marcelo Knauss	Argentina	55.94	
17	Upadhyay Kumar	India	54.02	
18	Roberto Jiménez	Nicaragua	53.22	
19	Roelof Geertsema	Netherlands	51.56	

==== Group B ====
Rank	Name	Nationality	Result	Notes
1	Vladimir Sasimovich	Soviet Union	72.16	Q
2	Mark Roberson	United Kingdom	69.62	Q
3	Gavin Lovegrove	New Zealand	69.20	Q
4	Mirosław Witek	Poland	68.60	Q
5	Juan Oxamendi	Cuba	67.76	Q
6	Kim Jae-Sang	South Korea	67.60	Q
7	Alain Storaci	France	66.90	q
8	Patrik Bodén	Sweden	66.24	q
9	José Gómez	Dominican Republic	66.22	
10	Steffen Thrän	East Germany	66.08	
11	John White	Australia	65.74	
12	Anders Höeffler	Denmark	65.54	
13	Giuseppe Soffiato	Italy	65.24	
14	Juha Laukkanen	Finland	65.02	
15	Ralph Willinski	West Germany	65.00	
16	Roy Seidmeyer	United States	61.98	
17	Abdul Azim Al-Aliwat	Saudi Arabia	60.98	
18	Tony Mucha	Canada	60.40	
19	Ivan Sibaja	Nicaragua	56.06	
20	Troy Patterson	Barbados	50.10	
21	Hussein Hassan Abdullah	United Arab Emirates	49.18	
22	Martin Rekab	Sierra Leone	42.26	

== Participation ==
According to an unofficial count, 41 athletes from 30 countries participated in the event.

- Argentina (1)
- Australia (1)
- Barbados (1)
- Canada (2)
- Cuba (2)
- Cyprus (1)
- Denmark (1)
- Dominican Republic (1)
- East Germany (2)
- Finland (2)
- France (2)
- India (1)
- Italy (1)
- Japan (1)
- Netherlands (1)
- New Zealand (1)
- Nicaragua (2)
- Poland (1)
- Romania (1)
- Saudi Arabia (1)
- Senegal (1)
- Sierra Leone (1)
- South Korea (1)
- Soviet Union (2)
- Sweden (2)
- United Arab Emirates (1)
- United Kingdom (2)
- United States (2)
- West Germany (2)
- Yugoslavia (1)
