= 1986 Arab Junior Athletics Championships =

2nd Arab Junior Athletics Championships
- Host city: Cairo, Egypt
- Events: 38

The 1986 Arab Junior Athletics Championships was the second edition of the international athletics competition for under-20 athletes from Arab countries. It took place in Cairo, Egypt. A total of 38 athletics events were contested, 22 for men and 16 for women. Algeria, a regional power in the sport, did not send a team.

Tunisia topped the medal table with twelve gold medals, most of them from the women's section. Morocco and Saudi Arabia each won seven gold medals and were closely followed by Egypt, which took six. Four top world-level athletes emerged at this competition, all of them Moroccan. In the men's 5000 metres, Brahim Boutayeb beat his compatriot Khalid Skah to the title – both went on to win gold medals in the 10,000 metres at the Olympics. In the women's 3000 metres, Zahra Ouaziz was only third in Cairo but as a senior she won two medals at the World Championships in Athletics. Nezha Bidouane was the Arab junior women's champion in the 100 metres hurdles and the runner-up in the 400 metres hurdles and later was a two-time world champion in the latter event.

The most successful athlete was Tunisia's Selma Khardani, who won the women's 800, 1500 and 3000 m titles. She won senior honours at national level, but not internationally. Hanan Ahmed Khaled was the second most successful athlete at the competition, winning the shot put and discus throw events, and also a javelin throw bronze medal; she became one of Egypt's most successful sportswomen, with four gold medals at the African Championships in Athletics to her name.

== Medal summary ==
=== Men ===
Event	Gold		Silver		Bronze	
100 metres	Mohammed Husawi (KSA)	10.78	Mohammed Al-Beshi (KSA)	10.85	Mohamed El Kandoussi (MAR)	10.92
200 metres	Mohammed Al-Beshi (KSA)	21.79 CR	Mohammed Husawi (KSA)	21.91	Mohamed El Kandoussi (MAR)	22.04
400 metres	Sultan Saad (KSA)	49.16	Yacoub Ishak (KUW)	49.19	Slim Ben Brahim (TUN)	49.41
800 metres	Brahim El-Ghazali (MAR)	1:54.21	Omar Ibrahim Mohamed (EGY)	1:54.77	Shawki Abdullah (QAT)	1:55.23
1500 metres	Brahim El-Ghazali (MAR)	3:51.59	Mohammed Khamis (QAT)	3:51.72	Abdelmalek Amanallah (MAR)	3:53.77
5000 metres	Brahim Boutayeb (MAR)	14:13.75 CR	Khalid Skah (MAR)	15:01.85	Noureddine Kamoun (TUN)	15:07.35
110 m hurdles	Khalid Salem Hassan (BHR)	14.85 CR	Ziad Enazi Abdulrazak (KUW)	15.04	Adnan Ali (KUW)	15.67
400 m hurdles	Khalid Salem Hassan (BHR)	52.84	Saleh Zayed (BHR)	54.93	Hassan El Fergui (MAR)	55.25
2000 metres steeplechase	Abdelmalek Amanallah (MAR)	5:49.29	Tawfik Boukroma (TUN)	5:51.82	Habib Boujlel (TUN)	5:57.20
4×100 m relay	Saudi Arabia (KSA)	42.22 CR	Bahrain (BHR)	42.99	Morocco (MAR)	43.97
4×400 m relay	Egypt (EGY)	3:20.88	Oman (OMN)	3:23.16	Tunisia (TUN)	3:24.69
30 km road race	Saleh Alawi (QAT)	2:01:44	Mohammed Sarsour (JOR)	2:04:22	Othman Ali (QAT)	2:10:52
15 km walk	Ahmed Abdel Hamid (EGY)	1:25:12	Salah Abdallah (EGY)	1:29:54	Walid Okasha (PLE)	1:35:13
High jump	Wahid Ahmed Abu Agala (EGY)	1.96 m	Mashal Douihi (KUW)	1.93 m	Omran Al-Maarouf (PLE)	1.90 m
Pole vault	Nasser Al-Wahibi (KSA)	4.30 m	Walid Zaid (QAT)	4.00 m	Mashal Abdullah (KUW)	4.00 m
Long jump	Talal Al-Sowailem (KUW)	6.76 m	Youssef Sayed Mohamed Awad (EGY)	6.67 m	Only two finishers	
Triple jump	Larbi Fezzani (TUN)	14.34 m	Youssef Sayed Mohamed Awad (EGY)	14.28 m	Hassan Ghazala (MAR)	14.15 m
Shot put	Khalid Salman Al-Khalidi (KSA)	15.65 m CR	Hussain Ali Al-Saeed (KUW)	15.08 m	Mahmoud Saeed Jala (KUW)	14.83 m
Discus throw	Mahmoud Mustafa (KUW)	41.04 m	Badr Abdulwahid (KUW)	40.68 m	Sherif Mohamed Abderrahim (EGY)	40.22 m
Hammer throw	Abdul Hakim Ali (QAT)	59.64 m CR	Badr Ali Al-Rashoud (KUW)	54.08 m	Riyad Rashid (BHR)	49.40 m
Javelin throw	Abdul Azim Al-Ewat (KSA)	59.30 m	Hussain Abbas (KUW)	56.44 m	Saeed Hamed (OMN)	56.42 m
Decathlon	Anis Driss (TUN)	5830 pts	Mashal Douihi (KUW)	5499 pts	Ahmed Hosni Abu Zid (EGY)	5229 pts

=== Women ===
Event	Gold		Silver		Bronze	
100 metres	Méryem Oumezdi (MAR)	12.23 CR	Lamia Makni (TUN)	12.42	Ilham Saïdi (MAR)	13.01
200 metres	Lamia Makni (TUN)	25.15 CR	Méryem Oumezdi (MAR)	25.69	Intisar Othman (JOR)	26.79
400 metres	Lamia Makni (TUN)	57.06 CR	Hend Kebaoui (TUN)	59.41	Intisar Othman (JOR)	60.29
800 metres	Selma Khardani (TUN)	2:18.00	Nadia Belattar (MAR)	2:21.27	Rahma Zouggar (MAR)	2:22.67
1500 metres	Selma Khardani (TUN)	4:39.08	Bouchra Belmoudden (MAR)	4:45.59	Nadia Belattar (MAR)	4:49.78
3000 metres	Selma Khardani (TUN)	10:35.39	Amin Ismail (JOR)	10:51.10	Zahra Ouaziz (MAR)	11:02.22
100 m hurdles	Nezha Bidouane (MAR)	15.20	Selma Triki (TUN)	16.67	Ilham Saïdi (MAR)	18.25
400 m hurdles	Hend Kebaoui (TUN)	64.35	Nezha Bidouane (MAR)	65.50	Samia Sassi (TUN)	67.36
4×100 m relay	Tunisia (TUN)	49.32	Morocco (MAR)	50.39	Egypt (EGY)	52.14
4×400 m relay	Tunisia (TUN)	4:01.68	Morocco (MAR)	4:11.76	Jordan (JOR)	4:16.78
High jump	Touria Aboudi (MAR)	1.58 m CR	Ilham Touati (MAR)	1.56 m	Rym Fatma Guizani (TUN)	1.54 m
Long jump	Nagwa Abd El Hay Riad (EGY)	5.52 m	Basma Fkih (TUN)	5.41 m	Hend Kebaoui (TUN)	5.36 m
Shot put	Hanan Ahmed Khaled (EGY)	11.74 m CR	Nadia Messadi (TUN)	10.06 m	Méryem Benamar (MAR)	9.87 m
Discus throw	Hanan Ahmed Khaled (EGY)	38.72 m	Nevin Idris (EGY)	28.70 m	Abir Mahmoud (PLE)	19.18 m
Javelin throw	Nadia Messadi (TUN)	30.04 m	Azza El Omari (EGY)	28.98 m	Hanan Ahmed Khaled (EGY)	26.96 m
Heptathlon	Nadia Messadi (TUN)	2608 pts	Hédia Zalila (TUN)	2510 pts	Ilham Touati (MAR)	2478 pts

== Medal table ==
Rank	Nation	Gold	Silver	Bronze	Total
1	Tunisia (TUN)	12	7	7	26
2	Morocco (MAR)	7	8	13	28
3	Saudi Arabia (KSA)	7	2	0	9
4	Egypt (EGY)	6	6	4	16
5	Kuwait (KUW)	2	8	3	13
6	Qatar (QAT)	2	2	2	6
7	Bahrain (BHR)	2	2	1	5
8	Jordan (JOR)	0	2	3	5
9	Oman (OMN)	0	1	1	2
10	Palestine (PLE)	0	0	2	2
Totals (10 entries)		38	38	36	112
