= 1995 World Championships in Athletics – Men's javelin throw =

These are the official results of the Men's Javelin Throw event at the 1995 World Championships in Gothenburg, Sweden. There were a total number of 37 participating athletes, with the final held on Sunday 13 August 1995. The qualification mark was set at 82.00 metres.

== Medalists ==
Gold	Jan Železný; Czech Republic (CZE)
Silver	(United Kingdom) Steve Backley; Great Britain (GBR)
Bronze	Boris Henry; Germany (GER)

== Schedule ==
- All times are Central European Time (UTC+1)

Qualification Round
Group A	Group B
11.08.1995 – 09:30h	11.08.1995 – 11:30h
Final Round
13.08.1995 – 16:00h

== Abbreviations ==
- All results shown are in metres

Q	automatic qualification
q	qualification by rank
DNS	did not start
NM	no mark
WR	world record
AR	area record
NR	national record
PB	personal best
SB	season best

== Records ==
Standing records prior to the 1995 World Athletics Championships
World Record	Jan Železný (CZE)	95.66 m	August 28, 1993	Sheffield, United Kingdom
Event Record	Jan Železný (CZE)	85.98 m	August 16, 1993	Stuttgart, Germany
Season Best	Raymond Hecht (GER)	92.60 m	July 21, 1995	Oslo, Norway
Broken records during the 1995 World Athletics Championships
Event Record	Boris Henry (GER)	87.60 m	August 13, 1995	Gothenburg, Sweden
Event Record	Jan Železný (CZE)	89.58 m	August 13, 1995	Gothenburg, Sweden

== Qualification ==
=== Group A ===
Rank	Overall	Athlete	Attempts			Distance
Rank	Overall	Athlete	1	2	3	Distance
1	4	Mick Hill (GBR)	X	83.54	—	83.54 m
2	9	Andreas Linden (GER)	66.30	80.16	X	80.16 m
3	10	Raymond Hecht (GER)	79.82	X	78.32	79.82 m
4	11	Harri Hakkarainen (FIN)	79.66	78.70	79.04	79.66 m
5	13	Vladimir Sasimovich (BLR)	78.40	78.94	76.54	78.94 m
6	14	Vladimir Ovchinnikov (RUS)	77.48	78.28	X	78.28 m
7	15	Patrik Bodén (SWE)	75.10	X	77.62	77.62 m
8	16	Andrew Currey (AUS)	76.84	72.50	74.50	76.84 m
9	19	Tom Pukstys (USA)	75.08	76.12	75.06	76.12 m
10	20	Gavin Lovegrove (NZL)	74.98	X	X	74.98 m
11	22	Kenneth Petersen (DEN)	X	69.32	74.22	74.22 m
12	24	Phillip Spies (RSA)	X	X	74.06	74.06 m
13	27	Ivan Mustapić (CRO)	X	73.12	71.34	73.12 m
14	28	Edgar Baumann (PAR)	72.90	71.40	70.78	72.90 m
15	30	Viktor Zaitsev (UZB)	X	X	71.08	71.08 m
16	31	Aleksandr Fingert (ISR)	68.30	66.46	70.94	70.94 m
17	34	Kazuhiro Mizoguchi (JPN)	X	68.66	X	68.66 m
18	35	Frans Mahuse (INA)	62.62	68.18	X	68.18 m
19	36	Fernando Palomo (ESA)	X	62.90	X	62.90 m

=== Group B ===
Rank	Overall	Athlete	Attempts			Distance
Rank	Overall	Athlete	1	2	3	Distance
1	1	Jan Železný (CZE)	78.98	90.12	—	90.12 m
2	2	Boris Henry (GER)	87.60	—	—	87.60 m
3	3	Andrey Moruyev (RUS)	85.60	—	—	85.60 m
4	5	Steve Backley (GBR)	83.20	—	—	83.20 m
5	6	Seppo Räty (FIN)	79.82	82.42	—	82.42 m
6	7	Yuriy Rybin (RUS)	X	X	82.14	82.14 m
7	8	Aki Parviainen (FIN)	72.74	80.98	—	80.98 m
8	12	Dag Wennlund (SWE)	74.02	77.42	79.00	79.00 m
9	17	Emeterio González (CUB)	X	X	76.54	76.54 m
10	18	Gregor Högler (AUT)	76.12	76.08	76.40	76.40 m
11	21	Terry McHugh (IRL)	74.58	73.90	71.64	74.58 m
12	23	Sigurður Einarsson (ISL)	74.10	73.74	71.18	74.10 m
13	25	Vladimir Parfyonov (UZB)	X	67.22	73.64	73.64 m
14	26	Fikret Özsoy (TUR)	73.50	X	X	73.50 m
15	29	Ed Kaminski (USA)	X	70.64	71.92	71.92 m
16	32	Kim Ki-Hun (KOR)	67.46	70.20	66.62	70.20 m
17	33	Juan de la Garza (MEX)	X	X	70.20	70.20 m
—	37	Donald Sild (EST)	X	X	—	NM

== Final ==
Rank	Athlete	Attempts						Distance	Note
Rank	Athlete	1	2	3	4	5	6	Distance	Note
1st place, gold medalist(s)	Jan Železný (CZE)	80.52	83.02	82.92	88.92	89.06	89.58	89.58 m	CR
2nd place, silver medalist(s)	Steve Backley (GBR)	81.10	X	78.30	X	84.92	86.30	86.30 m	
3rd place, bronze medalist(s)	Boris Henry (GER)	83.10	85.16	84.30	80.36	84.06	86.08	86.08 m	
4	Raymond Hecht (GER)	83.30	X	82.80	83.02	81.48	81.74	83.30 m	
5	Dag Wennlund (SWE)	X	78.68	82.04	—	—	—	82.04 m	
6	Mick Hill (GBR)	79.06	79.88	81.06	X	79.06	X	81.06 m	
7	Yuriy Rybin (RUS)	X	75.76	81.00	X	79.54	X	81.00 m	
8	Andreas Linden (GER)	X	80.76	X	79.72	—	78.16	80.76 m	
9	Aki Parviainen (FIN)	79.58	X	X				79.58 m	
10	Andrey Moruyev (RUS)	X	78.30	79.14				79.14 m	
11	Seppo Räty (FIN)	78.66	78.76	74.94				78.76 m	
12	Harri Hakkarainen (FIN)	74.74	76.00	78.16				78.16 m	

== See also ==
- 1991 Men's World Championships Javelin Throw (Tokyo)
- 1992 Men's Olympic Javelin Throw (Barcelona)
- 1994 Men's European Championships Javelin Throw (Helsinki)
- 1996 Men's Olympic Javelin Throw (Atlanta)
- 1998 Men's European Championships Javelin Throw (Budapest)
