= Athletics at the 2002 Commonwealth Games – Men's javelin throw =

Men's javelin throw at the Commonwealth Games
- Competitors: 11 from 7 nations
- Winning time: 86.81 m

Medalists
gold medal	Steve Backley	England
silver medal	Scott Russell	Canada
bronze medal	Nick Nieland	England

The men's javelin throw event at the 2002 Commonwealth Games was held on 31 July. The winning margin was 7.83 metres which as of 2024 remains the only time the men's javelin throw has been won by more than 7.5 metres at these games.

== Results ==
Rank	Athlete	Nationality	#1	#2	#3	#4	#5	#6	Result	Notes
1st place, gold medalist(s)	Steve Backley	England	86.81	84.94	x	–	–	–	86.81	
2nd place, silver medalist(s)	Scott Russell	Canada	78.98	75.49	x	72.20	75.92	x	78.98	
3rd place, bronze medalist(s)	Nick Nieland	England	71.80	71.72	73.15	74.54	78.63	x	78.63	
4	William Hamlyn-Harris	Australia	77.31	72.10	x	70.31	78.63	75.11	77.31	
5	Andrew Currey	Australia	74.88	73.07	76.81	74.60	76.98	x	76.98	
6	Mark Roberson	England	74.52	73.82	72.61	x	x	73.81	74.52	
7	Michael Allen	Northern Ireland	x	64.63	67.07	65.58	x	x	67.07	
8	James Goulding	Fiji	x	64.43	x	64.24	x	63.18	64.43	
9	Elvis Smith	Turks and Caicos Islands	32.03	42.87	x				42.87	
10	Nigel Faleuka	Niue	x	42.73	36.62				42.73	
	Mathew Faleuka	Niue							DNS	
