= Trevor Modeste =

Grenadian javelin thrower (born 1960)

Personal information
- Full name: Errol Trevor Modeste
- Nationality: Grenada
- Born: September 19, 1960 (age 65)

Sport
- Sport: Track and field
- Event: Javelin throw

Trevor Modeste (born 19 September 1960) is a former Grenadian javelin thrower.

== Competition record ==
Year	Competition	Venue	Position	Event	Notes
Representing Grenada
1982	Central American and Caribbean Games	Havana, Cuba	5th	Javelin throw	68.78 m
1983	World Championships	Helsinki, Finland	18th (q)	Javelin throw	51.84 m
1987	Pan American Games	Indianapolis, United States	9th	Shot put	12.55 m
1987	Pan American Games	Indianapolis, United States	7th	Javelin throw	64.12 m
1990	Central American and Caribbean Games	Mexico City, Mexico	6th	Javelin throw	68.12 m
1991	Pan American Games	Havana, Cuba	11th	Javelin throw	65.24 m
1991	World Championships	Tokyo, Japan	40th (q)	Javelin throw	62.68 m
1999	Central American and Caribbean Championships	Bridgetown, Barbados	1st	Javelin throw	63.92 m
2003	Central American and Caribbean Championships	St. George's, Grenada	5th	Javelin throw	63.64 m

== See also ==
- List of javelin throwers
