= Junior Cornette =

Guyanese sprinter (born 1966)

Personal information
- Born: 15 April 1966 (age 60)

Sport
- Sport: Track and field
Medal record
Representing Guyana
Central American and Caribbean Games
Bronze medal – third place	1990 Mexico City	200m

Junior Cornette (born 15 April 1966) is a retired Guyanese sprinter.

He won the bronze medal in the 200 metres at the 1990 Central American and Caribbean Games. He also competed at the 1991 and 1993 World Championships without reaching the final.

== Achievements ==
Year	Competition	Venue	Position	Event	Notes
Representing Guyana
1990	Central American and Caribbean Games	Mexico City, Mexico	4th	100 m	10.48 (w)
1990	Central American and Caribbean Games	Mexico City, Mexico	3rd	200 m	21.22
1991	Pan American Games	Havana, Cuba	14th (h)	100 m	10.88
1991	Pan American Games	Havana, Cuba	24th (h)	200 m	30.24
1991	World Championships	Tokyo, Japan	45th (h)	100 m	10.63
