= Athletics at the 1987 Pan American Games – Men's javelin throw =

Men's javelin throw at the Pan American Games

The men's javelin throw event at the 1987 Pan American Games was held in Indianapolis, United States on 15 August. It was the first time that the new model javelin was used at the Pan American Games and, therefore, a new games record was set.

== Results ==
Rank	Name	Nationality	#1	#2	#3	#4	#5	#6	Result	Notes
1st place, gold medalist(s)	Duncan Atwood	United States	78.04	75.90	76.38	x	74.82	78.68	78.68	GR
2nd place, silver medalist(s)	Ramón González	Cuba	75.58	71.76	–	x	–	x	75.58	
3rd place, bronze medalist(s)	Juan de la Garza	Mexico	72.94	73.76	68.92	x	72.26	72.84	73.76	
4	Mark Babich	United States	70.56	69.88	68.66	68.46	71.64	73.54	73.54	
5	Michael Mahovlich	Canada	67.48	69.70	68.40	x	68.70	67.60	69.70	
6	Luis Lucumí	Colombia	x	68.06	x	63.74	65.58	64.00	68.06	
7	Trevor Modeste	Grenada	61.76	64.12	x	x	x	56.80	64.12	
