= Juha Laukkanen =

Finnish javelin thrower

Personal information
- Full name: Juha Lauri Laukkanen
- Nationality: Finland
- Born: January 6, 1969 (age 57) Pielavesi, Pohjois-Savo, Finland
- Height: 186 cm (6 ft 1 in)
- Weight: 95–99 kg (209–218 lb)

Sport
- Sport: Athletics
- Event: Javelin throw
- Club: Laukkalan Luja, Pielavesi

Achievements and titles
- Olympic finals: 1992
- Personal bests: 88.22 m (Kuortane, 20 June 1992)

Juha Lauri Laukkanen (born 6 January 1969) is a retired male javelin thrower from Finland. His personal best throw is 88.22 metres, achieved in June 1992 in Kuortane. Remarkably, two of Laukkanen's throws have resulted in injuries to officials. In the 1994 Bislett Games in Oslo his throw resulted in a judge being impaled in his arm by the javelin. In 1998 at an athletics festival in Riederich, Germany another one of his throws seriously injured an official when it pierced him in the stomach.

== Seasonal bests by years ==
- 1987 - 79.46
- 1988 - 65.54
- 1992 - 88.22
- 1993 - 82.98
- 1994 - 81.66
- 1995 - 82.54
- 1996 - 87.12
- 1997 - 87.10
- 1998 - 86.96
- 1999 - 85.53
- 2000 - 82.35
- 2001 - 85.40
- 2002 - 78.93

== Achievements ==
Year	Competition	Venue	Position	Notes
Representing Finland
1986	World Junior Championships	Athens, Greece	19th (q)	65.02 m
1988	World Junior Championships	Sudbury, Canada	10th	65.54 m
1992	Olympic Games	Barcelona, Spain	6th	79.20 m
1994	European Championships	Helsinki, Finland	18th	75.86 m
1997	IAAF Grand Prix Final	Fukuoka, Japan	8th	81.44 m
1998	European Championships	Budapest, Hungary	5th	84.78 m
2001	World Championships	Edmonton, Canada	19th	78.28 m
