= Athletics at the 1991 Pan American Games – Men's javelin throw =

Men's javelin throw at the Pan American Games

The men's javelin throw event at the 1991 Pan American Games was held in Havana, Cuba on 5 August.

== Results ==
Rank	Name	Nationality	#1	#2	#3	#4	#5	#6	Result	Notes
1st place, gold medalist(s)	Ramón González	Cuba	x	x	79.12	x	x	73.40	79.12	
2nd place, silver medalist(s)	Michael Barnett	United States	70.58	69.42	74.38	75.00	77.40	75.46	77.40	
3rd place, bronze medalist(s)	Luis Lucumí	Colombia	65.54	67.02	77.38	70.04	72.18	x	77.38	
4	Héctor Duharte	Cuba	70.00	70.54	x	x	73.72	76.32	76.32	
5	Juan de la Garza	Mexico	72.86	69.48	71.70	x	71.28	66.56	72.86	
6	Steve Feraday	Canada	66.42	70.00	71.68	69.38	71.80	68.34	71.80	
7	Rodrigo Zelaya	Chile	60.64	64.94	69.38	65.94	65.38	70.86	70.86	
8	Dave Stephens	United States	69.12	69.80	67.72	x	x	x	69.80	
9	Kirk Thompson	Trinidad and Tobago	66.56	x	63.60				66.56	
10	Edgar Baumann	Paraguay	59.06	65.26	x				65.26	
11	Trevor Modeste	Grenada	65.24	63.12	47.82				65.24	
12	Gustavo Wielandt	Chile	64.36	63.50	62.88				64.36	
13	Kevin Smith	Bahamas	x	61.76	55.58				61.76	
14	Dale Davis	Bahamas	56.10	60.42	61.20				61.20	
15	Rigoberto Calderón	Nicaragua	x	59.32	59.62				59.62	
