= Harri Hakkarainen =

Finnish javelin thrower (born 1969)

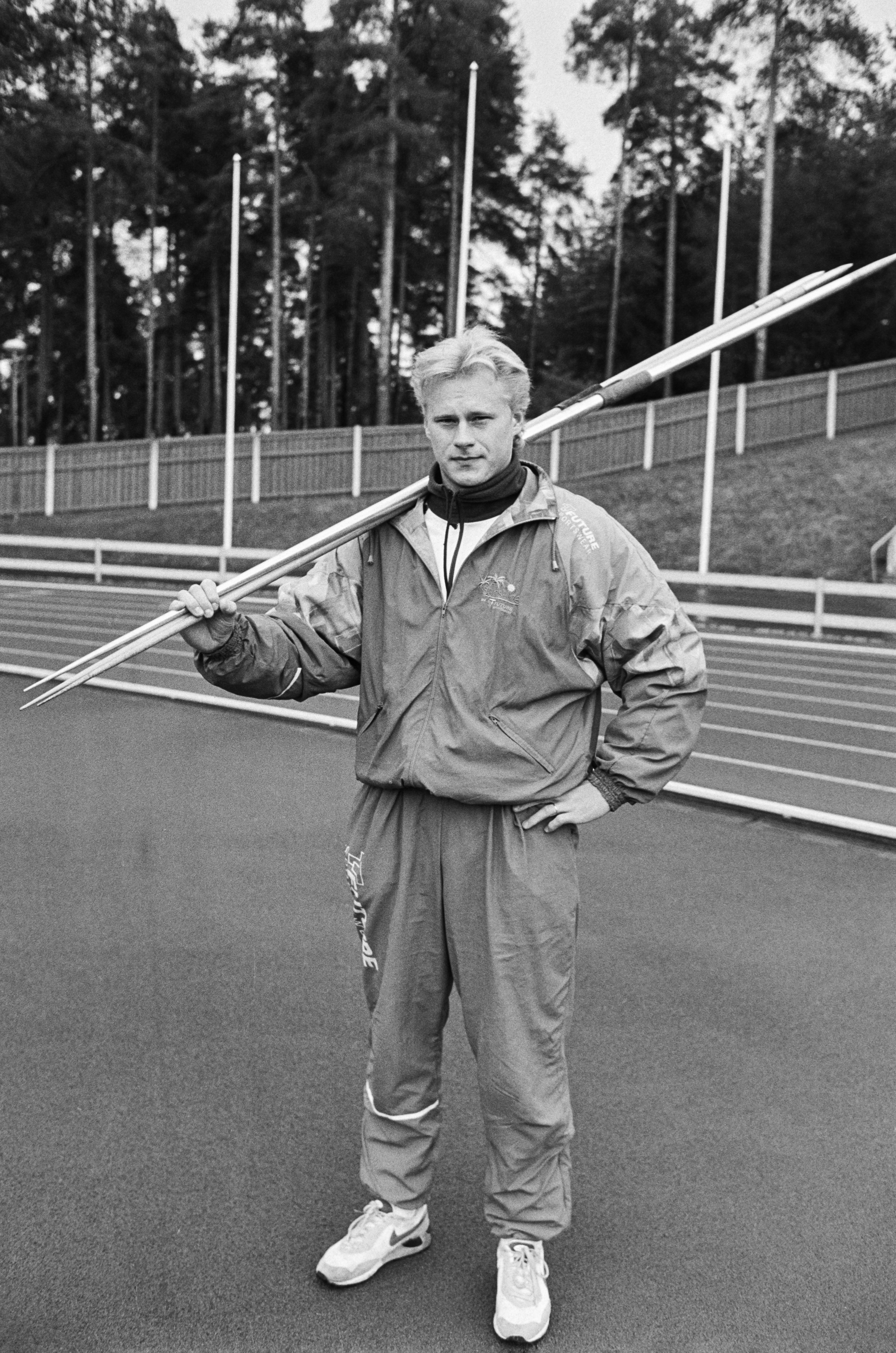
Harri Hakkarainen in the early 1990s.

Harri Tapio Hakkarainen (born 16 October 1969 in Kaavi) is a retired male javelin thrower from Finland. He set his personal best (87.82 metres) on 24 June 1995 in Kuortane.

== Seasonal bests by year ==
- 1986 – 60.38
- 1987 – 63.88
- 1988 – 65.78
- 1989 – 70.06
- 1992 – 83.46
- 1993 – 84.36
- 1994 – 85.46
- 1995 – 87.82
- 1996 – 87.44
- 1997 – 86.48
- 1998 – 85.34
- 1999 – 85.00
- 2000 – 85.65
- 2001 – 83.67
- 2002 – 80.56
- 2003 – 77.52
- 2004 – 74.60
- 2005 – 74.11
- 2006 – 71.34
- 2007 – 72.07
- 2008 – 72.11
- 2009 – 70.55
- 2010 – 65.46
- 2011 – 61.20
- 2012 – 61.85

== Achievements ==
Year	Competition	Venue	Position	Notes
Representing Finland
1994	European Championships	Helsinki, Finland	13th	78.82 m
1995	World Championships	Gothenburg, Sweden	12th	78.16 m
1996	Olympic Games	Atlanta, Georgia, United States	14th	79.34 m
2000	Olympic Games	Sydney, Australia	—	NM
