= Hubert Maingot =

Trinidad and Tobago athlete

Personal information
- Nationality: Trinidadian
- Born: 1953
- Died: 28 August 2009 (aged 56)

Sport
- Sport: Athletics
- Event(s): Shot put Discus throw
Medal record
Representing Trinidad and Tobago
Pan American Games
Bronze medal – third place	1983 Caracas	Shot put
Central American and Caribbean Games
Bronze medal – third place	1986 Santiago	Shot put

Hubert Maingot (1953 – died 28 August 2009) was a Trinidad and Tobago athlete in the shot put and discus throw.

Maingot was a six-time national champion in shot put (1975, 1977, 1979, 1980, 1989 & 1994) and won a further four national titles in discus (1979, 1980, 1981 & 1989). He was a bronze medalist in shot put at the 1983 Pan American Games in Caracas, where he also came seventh in discus. A former shot put national record holder, Maingot took the record from Olympian Roy Hollingsworth, improving the mark several times until his best throw of 17.68 m in 1985.

Maingot finished third behind Billy Cole in the shot put event at the British 1985 AAA Championships.

== Competition record ==
Year	Competition	Venue	Position	Event	Notes
Representing Trinidad and Tobago
1977	Central American and Caribbean Championships	Xalapa, Mexico	3rd	Shot put	15.72 m
1978	Central American and Caribbean Games	Medellín, Colombia	6th	Shot put	16.00 m
1983	Pan American Games	Caracas, Venezuela	3rd	Shot put	16.48 m
1983	Pan American Games	Caracas, Venezuela	7th	Discus throw	46.10 m
1986	Central American and Caribbean Games	Santiago, Dominican Republic	3rd	Shot put	16.99 m
1989	Central American and Caribbean Championships	San Juan, Puerto Rico	3rd	Shot put	16.39 m
1990	Central American and Caribbean Games	Mexico City, Mexico	5th	Shot put	16.10 m
1991	Pan American Games	Havana, Cuba	8th	Shot put	16.63 m
