= Athletics at the 1983 Pan American Games – Men's shot put =

Men's shot put at the Pan American Games

The men's shot put event at the 1983 Pan American Games was held in Caracas, Venezuela on 23 August.

== Results ==
Rank	Name	Nationality	Result	Notes
1st place, gold medalist(s)	Luis Delís	Cuba	18.24	
2nd place, silver medalist(s)	Gert Weil	Chile	17.30	
3rd place, bronze medalist(s)	Hubert Maingot	Trinidad and Tobago	16.48	
~~4~~	Juan de la Cruz	Dominican Republic	~~16.24~~	DQ
4	William Romero	Venezuela	15.73	
5	Wilfredo Jaimes	Venezuela	15.38	
	Paul Ruiz	Cuba	NM	
	Ian Pyka	United States	DNS	
	Jesse Stuart	United States	DNS	
