= Athletics at the 1987 Pan American Games – Men's shot put =

Men's shot put at the Pan American Games

The men's shot put event at the 1987 Pan American Games was held in Indianapolis, United States on 16 August.

== Results ==
Rank	Name	Nationality	#1	#2	#3	#4	#5	#6	Result	Notes
1st place, gold medalist(s)	Gert Weil	Chile	20.21	x	x	19.51	19.71	x	20.21	
2nd place, silver medalist(s)	Gregg Tafralis	United States	18.75	x	19.15	x	20.17	x	20.17	
3rd place, bronze medalist(s)	Paul Ruiz	Cuba	18.59	18.67	18.86	x	–	–	18.86	
4	José de Souza	Brazil	x	16.18	17.16	x	16.85	16.99	17.16	
5	James Dedier	Trinidad and Tobago	15.44	16.22	16.57	16.34	x	x	16.57	
6	Samuel Crespo	Puerto Rico	14.82	16.10	x	15.59	16.54	16.08	16.54	
7	Carlos Bryner	Argentina	13.94	x	14.03	x	x	14.01	14.03	
8	Jaime Comandari	El Salvador	x	12.79	12.47	13.26	13.28	13.79	13.79	
9	Trevor Modeste	Grenada	12.55	12.39	12.07				12.55	
10	Anthony George	Grenada	x	11.27	x				11.27	
	Jeff Braun	United States							DNS	
