= Steve Backley =

English javelin thrower (born 1969)

Steve Backley OBE
Personal information
- Nationality: British (English)
- Born: 12 February 1969 (age 57) Sidcup, England
- Years active: 1989–2004
- Height: 1.95 m (6 ft 5 in)
- Weight: 102 kg (225 lb)

Sport
- Sport: Track and field
- Event: Javelin throw
- Club: Cambridge Harriers

Achievements and titles
- Regional finals: 1990 Split: Javelin throw; Gold; 1994 Helsinki: Javelin throw; Gold; 1998 Budapest: Javelin throw; Gold; 2002 Munich: Javelin throw; Gold
- Personal bests: NR 91.46 m (1992)
Medal record
Men's athletics
Representing Great Britain
Olympic Games
Silver medal – second place	1996 Atlanta	Javelin
Silver medal – second place	2000 Sydney	Javelin
Bronze medal – third place	1992 Barcelona	Javelin
World Championships
Silver medal – second place	1995 Gothenburg	Javelin
Silver medal – second place	1997 Athens	Javelin
European Championships
Gold medal – first place	1990 Split	Javelin
Gold medal – first place	1994 Helsinki	Javelin
Gold medal – first place	1998 Budapest	Javelin
Gold medal – first place	2002 Munich	Javelin
Universiade
Gold medal – first place	1989 Duisburg	Javelin
Gold medal – first place	1991 Sheffield	Javelin
Representing England
Commonwealth Games
Gold medal – first place	1990 Auckland	Javelin
Gold medal – first place	1994 Victoria	Javelin
Gold medal – first place	2002 Manchester	Javelin
Silver medal – second place	1998 Kuala Lumpur	Javelin
- Updated on 10 February 2014

Stephen James Backley, OBE (born 12 February 1969) is an English retired track and field athlete who competed in the javelin throw. He formerly held the world record, and his 91.46-metre (300.1 ft) throw from 1992 is the British record. During his career, he was a firm fixture in the British national athletics team. He won four gold medals at the European Championships, three Commonwealth Games gold medals, two silvers and a bronze at the Olympic Games, and two silvers at the World Championships. Currently, he is a regular commentator for athletics competitions, especially the field events.

== Career ==
=== Early life ===
Backley was educated at Hurst Primary School, Bexley, and later at Bexley and Erith Technical High School for Boys (now Beths Grammar School) in his teens. He was a member of the South East London-based Cambridge Harriers Athletics club, and competed for Bexley in the London Youth Games. He enrolled at Loughborough University in October 1988 to study for a BSc Honours degree in physical education, sports science and recreation management. Although he completed his first year there and remained a student until 2002, the time he dedicated to the javelin prevented him from completing his studies. However, on 16 December 2002 Loughborough University honoured him with the degree of Doctor of Technology honoris causa.

Backley's first significant title, was won in 1987 when he threw 75.14 metres to pick up the European junior title, ahead of Vladimir Sasimovich (73.24) of Russia and East German Raymond Hecht (72.78). In 1988, Backley won the silver medal at the 1988 World Junior Championships. He also broke the world junior record that year.

=== 1990–1993: World records ===
In July 1990, Backley set a world record of 89.58m in Stockholm, Sweden. The record was then bettered by the Czech thrower Jan Železný a few weeks later, but Backley then regained the record with a throw 90.98m at Crystal Palace, London, to end the year as the world record holder. Finland's Seppo Räty then bettered the record in 1991. The records set by Železný and Räty, as well as Backley's 90.98m throw, had all been made using new 'Nemeth' javelins, however in August 1991 the IAAF declared this type of javelin illegal and all records set using them were retrospectively deleted. As a consequence, the world record reverted to the 89.58m mark that Backley had set in 1990. Backley then set another world record of 91.46m in January 1992 in New Zealand, a record which stood until 1993, when it was bettered by Železný.

=== 2000 Olympics and 2001 World championships ===
Backley started the year recovering from knee surgery throwing 82.19m against the U.S. in Glasgow, Scotland. The injury forced him to withdraw from the European Cup Super League meeting in Gateshead, England in early July. Due to injury his second competition came in August, taking second (85.84m) to Finlands Aki Parviainen in the Norwich Union Grand Prix and improved to 86.70m in winning the AAA Championship.

At Sydney, Australia, for the 2000 Summer Olympics he beat the qualifying mark with his very first throw (83.74m), although the favourite, Jan Železný, threw an enormous qualifying throw of 89.39m. In the final, Backley set a new Olympic record with his second throw of 89.95m, but in the third round two-time champion Železný threw a distance of 90.17m. Subsequent rounds did not see improvements from either competitor and again Železný won the gold medal ahead of Backley. Sergey Makarov took bronze.

With the 2001 World Championships in Athletics to look forward to, he threw over ninety metres for the first time since 1992 at the British Grand Prix at Crystal Palace on 22 July. He had trailed behind Latvian Ēriks Rags (86.47) and American Breaux Greer (85.91) who had both produced personal bests before he pulled out a huge 90.81 with his final throw.

This should have given him an enormous for boost for the worlds in Edmonton, but on 10 August Backley had not taken his A-game to the show. He could only manage 81.50 in the qualifying rounds and when both pools had finished this left him way down in thirteenth place. One consolation was that his teammate Mick Hill had qualified well, but even this good news was short lived as Mick unfortunately picked up an injury and only managed to record one distance in the final, finishing last.

Jan Železný took gold with a championship record of 92.80 ahead of Aki Parviainen (91.31) and Konstadinós Gatsioúdis of Greece (89.95). American, Breaux Greer once again increased his personal best to 87.00 in finishing one place outside the medals.

Such was his disgust at his performance he had been contemplating retirement but re-appeared in Gateshead, for the Norwich Union Classic and gained a little revenge by beating world silver medallist Aki Parviainen with a throw of 86.74. Of his six throws this day five of them would have qualified for final nine days earlier.

Backley then travelled to Brisbane in September to take part in the Goodwill Games but despite leading after two rounds, the up and down season continued and he could not improve to leave Jan Železný on top once again ahead of Ēriks Rags and Breaux Greer.

=== 2002 Commonwealth and European champion ===
It was going to be a busy with two major back-to-back competitions, the Commonwealth Games on 25 July – 4 August and the European Championships on 6–11 August .

On 31 July was the first test and with no major competition he knew that he had reclaimed his Commonwealth title after his very first throw of 86.81 in the City of Manchester Stadium. Runner up Scott Russell of Canada was nearly eight metres back with (78.98) and England's bronze medallist Nick Nieland managed only 78.63. This gave Backley a hat-trick of Commonwealth titles.

The European Championships in Munich would be much stiffer task with all of the World's leading exponents on show. Producing an opening throw of 86.29 and then surpassing that marginally in the third with 86.37 it was obvious that he was in form but he still trailed behind Russian leader Sergey Makarov who had sent out a massive 88.05 first round throw.

World record holder Jan Železný again found the European title beyond him and did not manage to record a distance so was eliminated after the third round. This seemed to inspire Backley and the reigning champion went half a metre past the leader in the fifth with 88.54. Makarov couldn't respond to this and ended up with silver with Germany's Boris Henry taking bronze with 85.33. This fantastic achievement made Backley the first British athlete to win four consecutive European Championship golds.

=== Closing career ===
Backley began the year having problems with a knee injury, but with an early season win in Sweden under his belt, and another victory on 13 July at the Norwich Union Grand Prix in Gateshead, throwing 85.69 to defeat Boris Henry (83.52) and Alexandr Ivanov (81.69), he put injury firmly behind him.

A couple of weeks later at the North Down International at Bangor Northern Ireland his opening throw of 81.42m was once again good enough to see off the competition.

It was therefore disappointing when after managing to qualify for the final, only in seventh position, at the IAAF championship Stade de France, Paris, on the final weekend of August, his third and best throw of only 80.13m could not take him through to the last eight in the Sunday final. Sergey Makarov took the title with 85.44 ahead of Andrus Värnik 85.17 and Boris Henry 84.74 with these all being recorded in the first round.

In Backley's final year of competition in 2004, where he was hoping to add to his Olympic medal haul, he struggled to find form and at the 2004 Summer Olympics in Athens, Greece, in a wide-open field, he only made the final as the last non-automatic qualifier. In the final his third round throw of 84.13 metres pulled him up to fourth place but he could not improve on this and finished in that position unable to gain a medal at his fourth consecutive games.

== Personal best ==
Backley's personal best was 91.46 metres achieved on 25 January 1992 at North Shore City, New Zealand. That throw still stands as the British record in men's javelin.

== Life outside athletics ==
Backley was awarded the MBE in the 1995 New Year's Honours list, and then an OBE in 2003. He was inducted into the London Youth Games Hall of Fame in 2009. Backley was on a special Olympic medal winners' version of Jungle Run, in which he, Mark Foster, and Iwan Thomas collected the most monkey statues.

Backley competed in the 2008 edition of Dancing on Ice with partner Susie Lipanova. He survived three consecutive skate-offs against Samantha Mumba, Aggie MacKenzie and Tim Vincent. However, Backley ended up in the skate-off for the fourth time in a row, where he lost out to Zaraah Abrahams and her partner Fred Palascak after the judges chose to save her. Backley finished 7th.

Backley has been a regular commentator for the BBC, working on athletics events. At the Beijing 2008 and London 2012 Olympics, he commentated for BBC Radio 5 Live. At the Rio 2016, Tokyo 2020 and Paris 2024 Olympics, Backley was the corporation's main field athletics commentator on television. He also worked commentated on the television coverage of the Glasgow 2014, Gold Coast 2018 and Birmingham 2022 Commonwealth Games.

In August 2014, Backley was one of 200 public figures who were signatories to a letter to The Guardian expressing their hope that Scotland would vote to remain part of the United Kingdom in September's independence referendum.

== International competitions ==
Year	Competition	Venue	Position	Notes
Representing Great Britain and England
1987	European Junior Championships	Birmingham, United Kingdom	1st	75.14 m
1988	World Junior Championships	Sudbury, Canada	2nd	75.40 m
1989	Universiade	Duisburg, West Germany	1st	85.60 m
1989	World Cup	Barcelona, Spain	1st	85.90 m
1990	Commonwealth Games	Auckland, New Zealand	1st	86.02 m
1990	European Championships	Split, Yugoslavia	1st	87.30 m
1991	Universiade	Sheffield, United Kingdom	1st	87.42 m
1991	World Championships	Tokyo, Japan	15th (q)	78.24 m
1992	Olympic Games	Barcelona, Spain	3rd	83.38 m
1993	World Championships	Stuttgart, Germany	4th	81.80 m
1994	Commonwealth Games	Victoria, Canada	1st	82.74 m
1994	European Championships	Helsinki, Finland	1st	85.20 m
1994	World Cup	London, United Kingdom	1st	85.02 m
1995	World Championships	Gothenburg, Sweden	2nd	86.30 m
1996	Olympic Games	Atlanta, United States	2nd	87.44 m
1997	World Championships	Athens, Greece	2nd	86.80 m
1998	European Championships	Budapest, Hungary	1st	89.72 m
1998	World Cup	Johannesburg, South Africa	1st	88.71 m
1998	Commonwealth Games	Kuala Lumpur, Malaysia	2nd	87.38 m
1999	World Championships	Seville, Spain	8th	83.84 m
2000	Olympic Games	Sydney, Australia	2nd	89.85 m
2001	World Championships	Edmonton, Canada	14th (h)	81.50 m
2001	Goodwill Games	Brisbane, Australia	4th	83.34 m
2002	Commonwealth Games	Manchester, United Kingdom	1st	86.81 m
2002	European Championships	Munich, Germany	1st	88.54 m
2002	World Cup	Madrid, Spain	4th	79.39 m
2003	World Championships	Paris, France	9th	80.13 m
2004	Olympic Games	Athens, Greece	4th	84.13 m

== Seasonal bests by year ==
World Record and / or 90m+ in bold.

- 1987 – 78.16
- 1988 – 79.50
- 1989 – 85.90
- 1990 – **90.98 ~~World record~~** (Note: As detailed above, the Németh model javelin introduced in 1990 was retroactively deemed illegal by the IAAF in August 1991)
  - 1990 – **89.58 World record**
- 1991 – 87.42
- 1992 – **91.46 World record**
- 1993 – 85.10
- 1994 – 85.20
- 1995 – 88.54
- 1996 – 87.44
- 1997 – 89.02
- 1998 – 89.89
- 1999 – 87.59
- 2000 – 89.85
- 2001 – 90.81
- 2002 – 88.54
- 2003 – 85.69
- 2004 – 84.13

== See also ==
- Lists of Olympic medalists
- List of Olympic medalists in athletics (men)

Records
Preceded by (Sweden) Patrik Bodén	Men's Javelin World Record Holder; 2 July 1990 – 6 April 1993	Succeeded by (Czech Republic) Jan Železný
