= Youssef Ali Nesaif Boukhamas =

Bahraini javelin thrower

Personal information
- Nationality: Bahraini
- Born: 1 January 1969 (age 57)

Sport
- Sport: Athletics
- Event: Javelin throw

Youssef Ali Nesaif Boukhamas (born 1 January 1969) is a Bahraini athlete. He competed in the men's javelin throw at the 1992 Summer Olympics.
