= Andrey Shevchuk =

Andrey Shevchuk (Russian: Андрей Шевчук; born 8 March 1970) is a retired Russian javelin thrower. Her personal best throw was 85.70 metres, achieved in June 1993 in Bratislava.

He won the bronze medal at the 1989 European Junior Championships, finished eighth at the 1992 Olympic Games and won the gold medal at the 1994 Goodwill Games. He competed at the 1994 European Championships without reaching the final.

== International competitions ==
Year	Competition	Venue	Position	Notes
Representing Unified Team
1992	Olympic Games	Barcelona, Spain	8th	77.74 m
Representing Russia
1994	European Championships	Helsinki, Finland	15th	78.56 m
