= Ramón González (javelin thrower) =

Cuban javelin thrower

Personal information
- Born: Ramón González Silva; August 24, 1966 (age 59)
Medal record
Representing Cuba
Pan American Games
Gold medal – first place	1991 Havana	Javelin throw
Silver medal – second place	1983 Caracas	Javelin throw
Silver medal – second place	1987 Indianapolis	Javelin throw
Central American and Caribbean Games
Gold medal – first place	1986 Santiago	Javelin throw
Gold medal – first place	1990 Mexico City	Javelin throw

Ramón González Silva (born August 24, 1966) is a retired male javelin thrower from Cuba, who won a total number of three medals (one gold, two silvers) at the Pan American Games during his career.

== Achievements ==
Year	Competition	Venue	Position	Notes
Representing Cuba
1983	Pan American Games	Caracas, Venezuela	2nd	78.34 m
1985	Central American and Caribbean Championships	Nassau, Bahamas	2nd	76.88 m
1985	Universiade	Kobe, Japan	5th	82.16 m
1986	Central American and Caribbean Games	Santiago de los Caballeros, DR	1st	77.32 m
1986	Ibero-American Championships	La Habana, Cuba	1st	76.38 m
1987	Pan American Games	Indianapolis, United States	2nd	75.58 m
1988	Ibero-American Championships	Mexico City, Mexico	1st	75.56 m A
1989	Universiade	Duisburg, West Germany	9th	76.10 m
1989	World Cup	Barcelona, Spain	5th	78.02 m^{1}
1990	Goodwill Games	Seattle, United States	2nd	80.84 m
1990	Central American and Caribbean Games	Mexico City, Mexico	1st	78.86 m
1991	Pan American Games	Havana, Cuba	1st	79.12 m
1991	World Championships	Tokyo, Japan	16th	77.72 m
1992	Ibero-American Championships	Seville, Spain	1st	75.88 m

^{1}Representing the Americas
