= Paul Ruiz =

Cuban shot putter

Personal information
- Born: 21 September 1962 (age 63)

Sport
- Sport: Track and field
Medal record
Representing Cuba
Pan American Games
Silver medal – second place	1991 Havana	Shot put
Bronze medal – third place	1987 Indianapolis	Shot put
Central American and Caribbean Games
Gold medal – first place	1986 Santiago	Shot put
Gold medal – first place	1990 Mexico City	Shot put
Bronze medal – third place	1982 Havana	Shot put

Paul Ruiz Mena (born 21 September 1962) is a Cuban retired shot putter. His personal best is 20.28 metres, achieved in May 1988 in Rostock.

== Achievements ==
Year	Competition	Venue	Position	Event	Notes
Representing Cuba
1981	Central American and Caribbean Championships	Santo Domingo, Dominican Republic	3rd	Shot put	16.40 m
1982	Central American and Caribbean Games	Havana, Cuba	3rd	Shot put	16.14 m
1983	Central American and Caribbean Championships	Havana, Cuba	1st	Shot put	17.76 m
1983	Pan American Games	Caracas, Venezuela	–	Shot put	NM
1985	Central American and Caribbean Championships	Nassau, Bahamas	1st	Shot put	18.98 m
1986	Central American and Caribbean Games	Santiago de los Caballeros, Dominican Republic	1st	Shot put	19.01 m
1986	Ibero-American Championships	Havana, Cuba	2nd	Shot put	18.24 m
1987	Pan American Games	Indianapolis, United States	3rd	Shot put	18.86 m
1988	Ibero-American Championships	Mexico City, Mexico	1st	Shot put	19.18 m A
1989	World Indoor Championships	Budapest, Hungary	10th	Shot put	18.80 m
1990	Central American and Caribbean Games	Mexico City, Mexico	1st	Shot put	18.93 m A
1991	World Indoor Championships	Seville, Spain	12th	Shot put	18.57 m
1991	Pan American Games	Havana, Cuba	2nd	Shot put	19.30 m
