= Ed Kaminski =

American javelin thrower

Personal information
- Born: March 26, 1968 (age 58) Kansas City, Kansas, United States
- Height: 6 ft 3 in (191 cm)
- Weight: 220 lb (100 kg)

Sport
- Sport: Track and field
- Event: Javelin throw
- College team: Johnson County; University of Arkansas
Medal record
Representing United States
Summer Universiade
Silver medal – second place	1993 Buffalo	Javelin throw

Ed Kaminski (born March 26, 1968, in Kansas City, Kansas) is a retired American track and field athlete who specialized in the javelin throw. He represented his country at three consecutive World Championships although without qualifying for the final on any occasion. In addition he won the silver medal at the 1993 Summer Universiade.

His personal best in the event is 82.44 meters (270 ft 6 in) set in Emporia in 1994.

== Competition record ==
Year	Competition	Venue	Position	Notes
Representing the United States
1991	Universiade	Sheffield, United Kingdom	9th	72.16 m
1993	Universiade	Buffalo, United States	2nd	77.52 m
1993	World Championships	Stuttgart, Germany	19th (q)	75.70 m
1995	Pan American Games	Mar del Plata, Argentina	6th	72.30 m
1995	World Championships	Gothenburg, Sweden	29th (q)	71.92 m
1997	World Championships	Athens, Greece	35th (q)	69.42 m
1998	Goodwill Games	Uniondale, United States	5th	74.08 m
