= Todd Riech =

American javelin thrower

Todd Ryan Riech
Personal information
- Full name: Todd Ryan Riech
- Nationality: American
- Born: October 24, 1970 (age 55) Hot Springs, Montana, USA
- Education: Fresno State University
- Occupations: Personal trainer, coach, former athlete
- Spouse: Brittany Borman
- Parents: Jack Riech (father), Gloria Riech (mother)
- Other interests: NCAA Champion (1994), Pan American Games Bronze Medalist (1995)

Sport
- Country: USA
- Sport: Track and field
- Position: Javelin thrower
- Event: Javelin throw
- College team: Fresno State University
- Team: USA
- Now coaching: yes

Achievements and titles
- Olympic finals: 1996 Summer Olympics
- Personal best: 82.12 m (269-5)

Todd Ryan Riech is a former American olympian as a javelin thrower. Riech is a personal trainer and coach.

== Early life ==
On October 24, 1970, Riech was born in Hot Springs, Montana. Reich's father is Jack Reich. Reich's mother is Gloria Riech, who is part native American-Indian and French. Riech is a registered native American-Indian.

== Education ==
Riech earned a bachelor's degree from Fresno State University.

== Career ==
In 1994, as a college student, Reich won the NCAA Championship with a national collegiate record in the Javelin Throw.

As an athlete, Riech set his best at the Olympic trials with throw of 268 feet, 7 inches.

Riech participated at the 1996 Summer Olympics in Atlanta, Georgia. He set his personal best (82.12/269-5) with the new javelin type on July 2, 2000, in Glasgow. Todd made 4 USA teams.

Riech became an assistant track coach at CSU Long Beach, where he coached the Men's and Women's Javelin teams.

Riech became a certified personal trainer and coach. Riech is the co-founder and co-owner of ProSport Physical Therapy and Performance in California.

== Personal life ==
Reich's wife is Brittany Borman, a retired female javelin thrower from the United States. They have two children. Reich and his family live in Fresno, California.

== International competitions ==
Year	Competition	Venue	Position	Notes
Representing the United States
1995	Pan American Games	Mar del Plata, Argentina	3rd	77.82 m
1996	Olympic Games	Atlanta, United States	17th	78.02 m
