= Athletics at the 1983 Pan American Games – Men's discus throw =

Men's discus throw at the Pan American Games

The men's discus throw event at the 1983 Pan American Games was held in Caracas, Venezuela on 25 August.

== Results ==
Rank	Name	Nationality	Result	Notes
1st place, gold medalist(s)	Luis Delís	Cuba	67.32	
2nd place, silver medalist(s)	Bradley Cooper	Bahamas	62.38	
3rd place, bronze medalist(s)	Juan Martínez	Cuba	62.04	
4	Gilberto Martínez	Dominican Republic	50.86	
5	Luis Palacios	Venezuela	49.14	
6	Wilfredo Jaimes	Venezuela	48.14	
7	Hubert Maingot	Trinidad and Tobago	46.10	
	Paul Bishop	United States	DNS	
	Greg McSeveney	United States	DNS	
