= 1988 World Junior Championships in Athletics – Men's javelin throw =

The men's javelin throw event at the 1988 World Junior Championships in Athletics was held in Sudbury, Ontario, Canada, at Laurentian University Stadium on 28 and 29 July.

== Medalists ==
Gold	Vladimir Ovchinnikov; Soviet Union
Silver	Steve Backley; United Kingdom
Bronze	Jens Reimann; East Germany

== Results ==
=== Final ===
29 July

Rank	Name	Nationality	Attempts						Result	Notes
Rank	Name	Nationality	1	2	3	4	5	6	Result	Notes
1st place, gold medalist(s)	Vladimir Ovchinnikov	Soviet Union	67.28	73.66	74.68	74.82	x	77.08	77.08	
2nd place, silver medalist(s)	Steve Backley	United Kingdom	64.82	71.50	75.40	72.48	73.56	72.14	75.40	
3rd place, bronze medalist(s)	Jens Reimann	East Germany	68.22	71.26	71.64	67.54	66.14	x	71.64	
4	Dmitriy Polyunin	Soviet Union	66.72	67.56	68.98	69.12	67.68	67.90	69.12	
5	Kimmo Solehmainen	Finland	67.34	67.06	68.62	68.78	68.22	68.58	68.78	
6	Johan van Lieshout	Netherlands	66.34	68.22	68.68	x	65.22	67.04	68.68	
7	Angel Mandzhukov	Bulgaria	68.54	x	68.52	66.80	x	x	68.54	
8	Art Skipper	United States	63.42	63.52	68.32	x	64.36	65.28	68.32	
9	Park Yong-Young	South Korea	68.28	63.94	61.40				68.28	
10	Juha Laukkanen	Finland	65.54	x	60.86				65.54	
11	John Richardson	United States	61.32	64.00	65.20				65.20	
12	Kimio Morisawa	Japan	63.70	63.94	x				63.94	

=== Qualifications ===
28 Jul

==== Group A ====
Rank	Name	Nationality	Attempts			Result	Notes
Rank	Name	Nationality	1	2	3	Result	Notes
1	Vladimir Ovchinnikov	Soviet Union	72.32	-	-	72.32	Q
2	Kimmo Solehmainen	Finland	70.96	-	-	70.96	Q
3	Jens Reimann	East Germany	65.34	70.10	-	70.10	Q
4	Park Yong-Young	South Korea	69.88	-	-	69.88	Q
5	Steve Backley	United Kingdom	66.30	68.66	-	68.66	Q
6	Juha Laukkanen	Finland	68.26	-	-	68.26	Q
7	Art Skipper	United States	66.90	67.78	-	67.78	Q
8	Dmitriy Polyunin	Soviet Union	67.64	-	-	67.64	Q
9	Johan van Lieshout	Netherlands	65.16	66.34	67.38	67.38	Q
10	Angel Mandzhukov	Bulgaria	63.36	66.82	67.25	67.26	Q
11	Kimio Morisawa	Japan	62.88	64.18	67.24	67.24	Q
12	John Richardson	United States	66.96	66.30	67.16	67.16	Q
13	Koji Simada	Japan	66.66	62.72	x	66.66	
14	Dag Inge Hansen	Norway	59.56	61.66	x	61.66	
15	Arne Indrebo	Norway	61.54	59.44	x	61.54	
16	Matt Hodgson	Australia	61.14	61.42	60.96	61.42	
17	Hans-Günter Schmidt	West Germany	60.16	61.28	59.40	61.28	

== Participation ==
According to an unofficial count, 17 athletes from 12 countries participated in the event.

- Australia (1)
- Bulgaria (1)
- East Germany (1)
- Finland (2)
- Japan (2)
- Netherlands (1)
- Norway (2)
- South Korea (1)
- Soviet Union (2)
- United Kingdom (1)
- United States (2)
- West Germany (1)
