= Andreas Linden =

German javelin thrower

Andreas Linden (born 20 February 1965) is a retired javelin thrower from Germany. He set his personal best (85.42 metres) on 17 September 1995 in Mülheim-Kärlich.

== Achievements ==
Year	Competition	Venue	Position	Notes
Representing West Germany
1987	World Championships	Rome, Italy	27th	72.22 m
Representing Germany
1995	World Championships	Gothenburg, Sweden	8th	80.76 m
1997	World Championships	Athens, Greece	19th	75.90 m
1998	European Championships	Budapest, Hungary	14th	78.98 m
