= Athletics at the 1993 Summer Universiade – Men's javelin throw =

The men's javelin throw event at the 1993 Summer Universiade was held at the UB Stadium in Buffalo, United States on 18 July 1993.

== Results ==
Rank	Athlete	Nationality	Result	Notes
1st place, gold medalist(s)	Louis Fouché	South Africa	79.64	
2nd place, silver medalist(s)	Ed Kaminski	United States	77.52	
3rd place, bronze medalist(s)	Mika Parviainen	Finland	77.14	
4	Tommi Huotilainen	Finland	74.12	
5	Radoman Šćekić	Independent Participants	73.46	
6	Andriy Maznichenko	Ukraine	73.42	
7	Diggory Brooke	New Zealand	73.26	
8	Nick Nieland	Great Britain	70.84	
9	Johan Helge	Sweden	67.94	
10	Satbir Singh Saran	India	65.86	
11	Raimundo Fernández	Spain	62.50	
12	Rolando Laviena	Puerto Rico	56.20	
13	Aaron Zyambo	Zambia	40.86	
