= Athletics at the 1991 Pan American Games – Men's shot put =

Men's shot put at the Pan American Games

The men's shot put event at the 1991 Pan American Games was held in Havana, Cuba on 8 August.

== Results ==
Rank	Name	Nationality	#1	#2	#3	#4	#5	#6	Result	Notes
1st place, gold medalist(s)	Gert Weil	Chile	18.53	18.80	18.76	19.47	x	19.34	19.47	
2nd place, silver medalist(s)	Paul Ruiz	Cuba	19.30	x	x	19.19	x	x	19.30	
3rd place, bronze medalist(s)	C. J. Hunter	United States	16.93	18.66	18.14	18.68	x	19.08	19.08	
4	Jorge Montenegro	Cuba	18.90	18.53	x	18.96	18.55	18.54	18.96	
5	David Wilson	United States	16.75	16.72	18.03	17.35	x	x	18.03	
6	Robert Venier	Canada	17.41	17.94	x	x	17.36	x	17.94	
7	Francisco Ball	Puerto Rico	16.44	16.82	16.56	x	17.23	17.15	17.23	
8	Hubert Maingot	Trinidad and Tobago	15.99	16.63	15.94	x	16.03	x	16.63	
