= Louis Fouché (javelin thrower) =

South African javelin thrower

Personal information
- Born: 21 March 1970 (age 56)

Sport
- Sport: Track and field
Medal record
Representing South Africa
Summer Universiade
Gold medal – first place	1993 Buffalo	Javelin throw
African Championships
Silver medal – second place	1996 Yaoundé	Javelin throw
Bronze medal – third place	1993 Durban	Javelin throw
African Games
Bronze medal – third place	1995 Harare	Javelin throw

Louis Fouché (born 21 March 1970) is a retired South African javelin thrower.

He won the gold medal at the 1993 Summer Universiade, the bronze medal at the 1993 African Championships, finished fifth at the 1994 World Cup, fifth at the 1994 Commonwealth Games, won the bronze medal at the 1995 All-Africa Games, and the silver medal at the 1996 African Championships,

His personal best throw was 79.64 metres, achieved at the 1993 Summer Universiade in Buffalo.
