= Yasuo Nakamura =

Japanese bobsledder (born 1971)

Personal information
- Nationality: Japanese
- Born: 17 May 1971 (age 53); Matsue, Japan

Sport
- Sport: Bobsleigh

Yasuo Nakamura (中村 康夫, Nakamura Yasuo, born 17 May 1971) is a Japanese bobsledder. He competed in the four man event at the 1998 Winter Olympics.
