= Dumitru Negoiță =

Romanian javelin thrower

Personal information
- Born: 9 February 1960 (age 66)

Sport
- Sport: Track and field
Medal record
Representing Romania
Summer Universiade
Gold medal – first place	1985 Kobe	Javelin throw

Dumitru Negoiţă (Romanian pronunciation: [duˈmitru neɡoˈit͡sə]; born 9 February 1960) is a retired male javelin thrower from Romania. He set his personal best (81.88 metres) on 22 July 1990 in Bucharest. Negoiţă is best known for winning the gold medal in the men's javelin throw event at the 1985 Summer Universiade in Kobe, Japan.
