= Siegfried Regales =

Dutch sprinter

Personal information
- Nationality: Dutch Antillean
- Born: 2 February 1953 (age 73)
- Height: 1.73 m (5 ft 8 in)
- Weight: 70 kg (154 lb)

Sport
- Sport: Sprinting
- Event: 100 metres

Siegfried Merced Regales (born 2 February 1953) is a sprinter who represented the Netherlands Antilles. He competed in the men's 100 metres at the 1976 Summer Olympics.
