= Louis Fouché (shot putter) =

South African shot putter

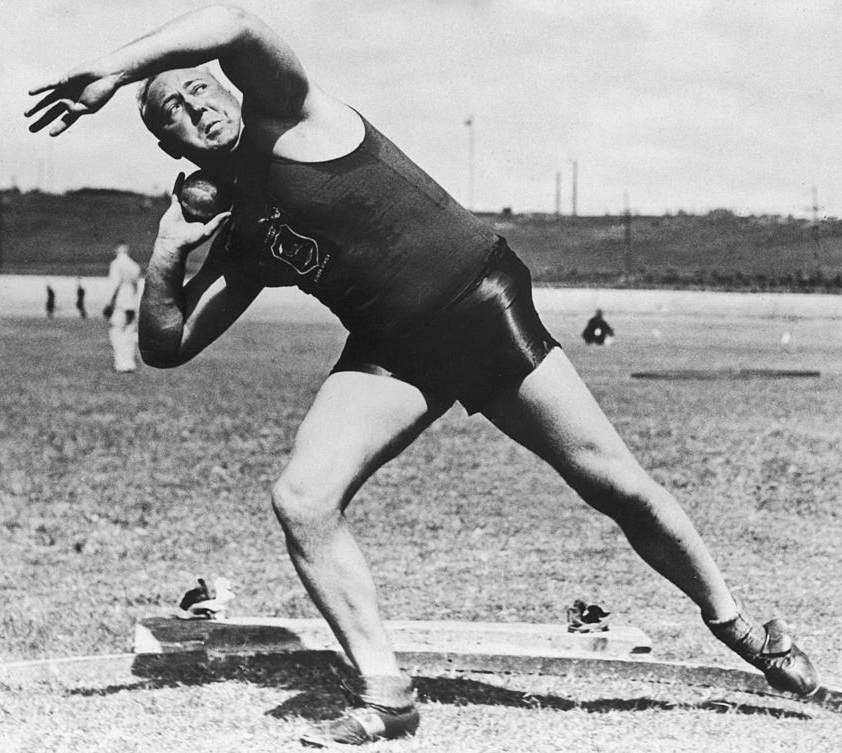
- Fouché at the 1938 British Empire Games

Personal information
- Born: 22 December 1912
- Died: 1971

Sport
- Sport: Athletics
- Event: Shot put

Achievements and titles
- Personal best: 15.64 m (1938)
Medal record
Representing South Africa
British Empire Games
Gold medal – first place	1938 Sydney	Shot put

Louis Alec Fouché (22 December 1912 – 1971) was a South African shot putter who won a gold medal at the 1938 British Empire Games.
