= Athletics at the 1992 Summer Olympics – Men's javelin throw =

Men's javelin throw at the Games of the XXV Olympiad
- Pictogram for athletics
- Venue: Estadi Olímpic de Montjuïc
- Date: 7 August (qualification); 8 August (final)
- Competitors: 32 from 21 nations
- Winning distance: 89.66

Medalists
1st place, gold medalist(s)		Jan Železný; Czechoslovakia
2nd place, silver medalist(s)		Seppo Räty; Finland
3rd place, bronze medalist(s)		Steve Backley; Great Britain

Official Video Highlights

These are the official results of the Men's Javelin Throw event at the 1992 Summer Olympics in Barcelona, Spain. There were a total number of 32 participating athletes. The final was held on August 8, 1992, and the qualifying round on August 7, 1992, with the qualification mark set at 80.00 metres.

== Medalists ==
Gold	Jan Železný; Czechoslovakia
Silver	Seppo Räty; Finland
Bronze	Steve Backley; Great Britain

== Schedule ==
Qualification Round
Group A	Group B
07.08.1992 – 09:25h	07.08.1992 – 10:45h
Final Round
08.08.1992 – 18:55h

== Abbreviations ==
- All results shown are in metres

Q	automatic qualification
q	qualification by rank
DNS	did not start
NM	no mark
OR	olympic record
WR	world record
AR	area record
NR	national record
PB	personal best
SB	season best

== Records ==
Standing records prior to the 1992 Summer Olympics
World Record	Steve Backley (GBR)	91.46 m	January 25, 1992	North Shore, New Zealand
Olympic Record	Jan Železný (TCH)	85.90 m	September 24, 1988	Seoul, South Korea
Broken records during the 1992 Summer Olympics
Olympic Record	Jan Železný (TCH)	89.66 m	August 8, 1992	Barcelona, Spain

== Qualification ==
=== Group A ===
Rank	Overall	Athlete	Attempts			Distance
Rank	Overall	Athlete	1	2	3	Distance
1	1	Jan Železný (TCH)	83.96	—	—	83.96 m
2	2	Tom Pukstys (USA)	74.30	81.16	—	81.16 m
3	4	Gavin Lovegrove (NZL)	76.28	X	81.04	81.04 m
4	9	Juha Laukkanen (FIN)	X	77.14	79.78	79.78 m
5	10	Mick Hill (GBR)	76.30	76.76	79.66	79.66 m
6	11	Siggi Einarsson (ISL)	76.06	77.02	79.50	79.50 m
7	13	Viktor Zaitsev (EUN)	75.24	X	79.12	79.12 m
8	16	Patrik Bodén (SWE)	75.78	X	77.70	77.70 m
9	17	Ivan Mustapić (CRO)	75.66	77.50	X	77.50 m
10	20	Julián Sotelo (ESP)	X	75.34	72.98	75.34 m
11	21	Brian Crouser (USA)	71.42	74.98	X	74.98 m
12	25	Zhang Lianbiao (CHN)	70.84	73.86	73.68	73.86 m
13	26	Nigel Bevan (GBR)	X	73.78	X	72.78 m
14	27	Terry McHugh (IRL)	70.76	73.26	71.64	73.26 m
15	29	Stephen Feraday (CAN)	70.94	X	X	70.94 m
16	31	Youssef Ali Nesaif Boukhamas (BRN)	55.24	53.80	52.30	55.24 m

=== Group B ===
Rank	Overall	Athlete	Attempts			Distance
Rank	Overall	Athlete	1	2	3	Distance
1	3	Volker Hadwich (GER)	81.10	—	—	81.10 m
2	5	Steve Backley (GBR)	79.36	80.76	—	80.76 m
3	6	Seppo Räty (FIN)	78.96	80.24	—	80.24 m
4	7	Andrey Shevchuk (EUN)	80.22	—	—	80.22 m
5	7	Kimmo Kinnunen (FIN)	80.22	—	—	80.22 m
6	12	Michael Barnett (USA)	77.08	79.14	75.34	79.14 m
7	14	Einar Vilhjálmsson (ISL)	76.18	76.82	78.70	78.70 m
8	15	Dag Wennlund (SWE)	76.28	77.70	77.88	77.88 m
9	18	Dmitriy Polyunin (EUN)	X	75.70	76.40	76.40 m
10	19	Mārcis Štrobinders (LAT)	73.76	X	76.32	76.32 m
11	22	Peter Borglund (SWE)	71.38	74.72	72.70	74.72 m
12	23	Masami Yoshida (JPN)	71.66	73.68	73.88	73.88 m
13	24	Vadim Bavikim (ISR)	73.88	X	73.24	73.88 m
14	28	Kim Ki-Hoon (KOR)	72.68	69.30	68.26	72.68 m
15	30	Nery Kennedy (PAR)	65.00	55.10	59.34	65.00 m
—	2	Ghanim Mabrouk (KUW)	X	X	X	NM

== Final ==
Rank	Athlete	Attempts						Distance	Note
Rank	Athlete	1	2	3	4	5	6	Distance	Note
1st place, gold medalist(s)	Jan Železný (TCH)	89.66	X	X	88.18	86.28	X	89.66 m	OR
2nd place, silver medalist(s)	Seppo Räty (FIN)	78.50	86.60	81.44	83.22	X	X	86.60 m	
3rd place, bronze medalist(s)	Steve Backley (GBR)	82.44	82.02	79.46	83.38	78.32	79.86	83.38 m	
4	Kimmo Kinnunen (FIN)	X	82.62	X	X	X	X	82.62 m	
5	Sigurður Einarsson (ISL)	79.52	75.02	77.96	X	X	80.34	80.34 m	
6	Juha Laukkanen (FIN)	77.44	X	74.56	76.92	79.20	78.46	79.20 m	
7	Michael Barnett (USA)	78.64	78.58	X	77.70	74.12	X	78.64 m	
8	Andrey Shevchuk (EUN)	77.00	X	77.74	X	X	73.42	77.74 m	
9	Gavin Lovegrove (NZL)	74.46	77.08	76.78				77.08 m	
10	Tom Pukstys (USA)	76.72	X	72.12				76.72 m	
11	Mick Hill (GBR)	75.50	X	72.02				75.50 m	
12	Volker Hadwich (GER)	75.28	72.98	70.12				75.28 m	

== See also ==
- 1990 Men's European Championships Javelin Throw (Split)
- 1991 Men's World Championship Javelin Throw
- 1992 Javelin Throw Year Ranking
- 1993 Men's World Championships Javelin Throw (Stuttgart)
- 1994 Men's European Championships Javelin Throw (Helsinki)
