= Gail Prescod =

Vincentian sprinter (born 1971)

Personal information
- Born: 12 August 1971 (age 54)

Sport
- Country: Saint Vincent and the Grenadines
- Sport: Athletics

Gail Michelle Prescod (born 12 August 1971) is a Vincentian sprinter who competed at the 1992 Summer Olympics in Barcelona, Spain.

Prescod competed in the 100 metres at the 1992 Summer Olympics, she ran the distance in 12.41 seconds and came last in her heat but finished 48th out of the 54 starters.
