= Juan de la Garza =

Mexican javelin thrower (born 1961)

Personal information
- Born: September 20, 1961 (age 64) Monclova, Mexico

Sport
- Sport: Track and field
Medal record
Representing Mexico
Pan American Games
Bronze medal – third place	1987 Indianapolis	Javelin throw
Central American and Caribbean Games
Silver medal – second place	1986 Santiago	Javelin throw
Silver medal – second place	1990 Mexico City	Javelin throw

Juan Gerardo de la Garza Tenorio "Chico" (born September 20, 1961) is a retired javelin thrower from Mexico, who won the bronze medal at the 1987 Pan American Games during his career. He was an assistant throws coach at Texas A&M University, where he also ran for the Texas A&M Aggies track and field team. He retired in 2025.

== Achievements ==
Year	Competition	Venue	Position	Notes
Representing Mexico
1981	Central American and Caribbean Championships	Santo Domingo, Dominican Republic	3rd	72.70 m
1981	Universiade	Bucharest, Romania	17th (q)	71.16 m
1982	Central American and Caribbean Games	Havana, Cuba	4th	71.10 m
1983	Central American and Caribbean Championships	Havana, Cuba	3rd	75.22 m
1984	Olympic Games	Los Angeles, United States	14th	79.16 m
1985	Central American and Caribbean Championships	Nassau, Bahamas	3rd	74.90 m
1986	Central American and Caribbean Games	Santiago, Dominican Republic	2nd	74.28 m
1987	Pan American Games	Indianapolis, United States	3rd	73.76 m
1987	World Championships	Rome, Italy	25th	73.36 m
1988	Ibero-American Championships	Mexico City, Mexico	2nd	73.48 m A
1990	Central American and Caribbean Games	Mexico City, Mexico	2nd	76.60 m
1991	Central American and Caribbean Championships	Xalapa, Veracruz, Mexico	1st	75.78 m
1991	Pan American Games	Havana, Cuba	5th	72.86 m
1991	World Championships	Tokyo, Japan	31st	72.84 m
1992	Ibero-American Championships	Seville, Spain	5th	68.72 m
1993	World Championships	Stuttgart, Germany	39th (q)	70.86 m
1993	Central American and Caribbean Games	Ponce, Puerto Rico	4th	68.98 m
1995	Central American and Caribbean Championships	Guatemala City, Guatemala	2nd	74.74 m
1995	World Championships	Gothenburg, Sweden	33rd	70.20 m
1997	World Championships	Athens, Greece	30th	71.98 m
