= Peter Schreiber =

German javelin thrower

Personal information
- Born: 9 August 1964 (age 62)

Sport
- Sport: Track and field

Peter-Uwe Schreiber (born 9 August 1964) is a retired West German javelin thrower.

He competed at the European Athletics Championships in 1986 and 1990 without reaching the final. He represented the sports club LG Bayer Leverkusen, and won silver medals at the West German championships in 1988 and 1990.

His personal best throw was 83.28 metres, achieved in July 1990 in Bochum.

== International competitions ==
Year	Competition	Venue	Position	Notes
Representing Germany
1990	European Championships	Split, FR Yugoslavia	23rd	74.08 m
