= Hussain Abbas =

Emirati footballer (born 1994)

Personal information
- Full name: Hussain Abbas Jumaa
- Date of birth: 30 November 1994 (age 31)
- Place of birth: United Arab Emirates
- Height: 1.73 m (5 ft 8 in)
- Position: Left back

Team information
- Current team: Dubai United
- Number: 52

Youth career
- Al Nasr

Senior career*
Years	Team	Apps	(Gls)
2013–2018	Al Nasr	35	(2)
2018–2020	Al-Wahda	25	(0)
2020–2024	Baniyas	67	(0)
2024–2025	Dibba Al-Hisn	10	(0)
2025–	Dubai United	0	(0)
- * Club domestic league appearances and goals

Hussain Abbas (Arabic:حسين عباس) (born 30 November 1994) is an Emirati footballer. He currently plays for Dubai United as a left back.
