= Mark Roberson =

English javelin thrower (born 1967)

Personal information
- Nationality: British (English)
- Born: 13 March 1967 (age 58) Cambridge, England

Sport
- Sport: Athletics
- Event: Javelin
- Club: Haringey AC

Mark W. Roberson (born 13 March 1967) is a retired javelin thrower. He represented England at four successive Commonwealth Games between 1990 and 2002.

== Biography ==
He won the silver medal at the 1986 World Junior Championships, finished sixth at the 1990 Commonwealth Games, seventh at the 1994 Commonwealth Games, sixth at the 1998 European Championships, fourth at the 1998 Commonwealth Games and sixth at the 2002 Commonwealth Games.

Roberson was twice British javelin throw champion after winning the 1997 AAA Championships and the 2001 AAA Championships.

His personal best throw was 85.67 metres, achieved in July 1998 in Gateshead.
