= Nigel Bevan =

British javelin thrower

Personal information
- Nationality: British (English)
- Born: 3 January 1968 (age 58) Ipswich, England
- Height: 186 cm (6 ft 1 in)
- Weight: 92 kg (203 lb)

Sport
- Sport: Athletics
- Event: Javelin throw
- Club: Belgrave Harriers

Nigel Charles Bevan (born 3 January 1968) is a British athlete. He competed in the men's javelin throw at the 1992 Summer Olympics. He set the Welsh record of 81.70m in 1992 in Birmingham.

== Biography ==
Bevan twice finished son the podium in the javelin throw event at the 1992 AAA Championships and 1995 AAA Championships.

At the 1992 Olympic Games in Barcelona, he represented Great Britain in the javelin event.
