= 2000 World Junior Championships in Athletics – Men's javelin throw =

The men's javelin throw event at the 2000 World Junior Championships in Athletics was held in Santiago, Chile, at Estadio Nacional Julio Martínez Prádanos on 21 and 22 October.

== Medalists ==
Gold	Hardus Pienaar; South Africa
Silver	Andreas Thorkildsen; Norway
Bronze	Park Jae-Myeong; South Korea

== Results ==
=== Final ===
22 October

Rank	Name	Nationality	Attempts						Result	Notes
Rank	Name	Nationality	1	2	3	4	5	6	Result	Notes
1st place, gold medalist(s)	Hardus Pienaar	South Africa	67.55	75.12	78.11	68.62	71.91	75.26	78.11	
2nd place, silver medalist(s)	Andreas Thorkildsen	Norway	70.60	74.72	76.34	75.21	71.37	73.97	76.34	
3rd place, bronze medalist(s)	Park Jae-Myeong	South Korea	71.31	69.17	71.61	72.36	71.57	x	72.36	
4	Jānis Liepa	Latvia	70.89	x	64.04	x	x	71.93	71.93	
5	Song Dong-Hyun	South Korea	70.08	71.20	x	x	69.54	x	71.20	
6	Aleksandr Ivanov	Russia	69.03	64.41	69.21	71.02	70.81	x	71.02	
7	Chen Te-Chun	Chinese Taipei	62.15	68.39	62.12	61.91	x	x	68.39	
8	Vadims Vasiļevskis	Latvia	67.51	68.14	x	65.89	x	65.89	68.14	
9	Stefan Wenk	Germany	65.68	64.21	x				65.68	
10	Tomas Intas	Lithuania	x	65.63	x				65.63	
11	Joachim Kiteau	France	62.54	x	65.55				65.55	
12	Mohamed Al-Khalifa	Qatar	64.29	x	x				64.29	

=== Qualifications ===
21 October

==== Group A ====
Rank	Name	Nationality	Attempts			Result	Notes
Rank	Name	Nationality	1	2	3	Result	Notes
1	Jānis Liepa	Latvia	75.61	-	-	75.61	Q
2	Joachim Kiteau	France	70.53	61.75	69.60	70.53	q
3	Aleksandr Ivanov	Russia	69.27	70.11	69.72	70.11	q
4	Mohamed Al-Khalifa	Qatar	68.34	65.66	66.22	68.34	q
5	Chen Te-Chun	Chinese Taipei	68.16	68.08	65.90	68.16	q
6	Song Dong-Hyun	South Korea	67.75	65.81	66.25	67.75	q
7	Daniel Baganz	Germany	67.21	x	59.31	67.21	
8	Willie Human	South Africa	61.53	61.99	66.32	66.32	
9	Peter Zupanc	Slovenia	x	60.02	65.80	65.80	
10	Yeóryios Íltsios	Greece	62.46	65.76	63.67	65.76	
11	Trevor Snyder	Canada	61.48	x	65.67	65.67	
12	Daniel Kratzmann	Australia	64.78	63.90	x	64.78	
13	Jitsuya Utoda	Japan	63.17	63.78	64.72	64.72	
14	Pablo Alfano	Argentina	59.01	60.87	60.90	60.90	
15	Alexon Maximiano	Brazil	60.56	60.79	59.46	60.79	
16	Pasi Kuusinen	Finland	x	59.18	58.34	59.18	

==== Group B ====
Rank	Name	Nationality	Attempts			Result	Notes
Rank	Name	Nationality	1	2	3	Result	Notes
1	Hardus Pienaar	South Africa	75.04	-	-	75.04	Q
2	Andreas Thorkildsen	Norway	71.51	74.20	-	74.20	Q
3	Park Jae-Myeong	South Korea	57.39	68.64	71.26	71.26	q
4	Stefan Wenk	Germany	69.58	67.28	67.77	69.58	q
5	Tomas Intas	Lithuania	66.61	68.58	x	68.58	q
6	Vadims Vasiļevskis	Latvia	68.47	64.71	66.61	68.47	q
7	Chen Qi	China	x	67.65	66.54	67.65	
8	Andrew Hall	Australia	64.91	67.42	66.63	67.42	
9	Tero Pitkämäki	Finland	66.59	62.73	61.72	66.59	
10	Bérenger Demerval	France	65.91	60.82	63.22	65.91	
11	Phill Sharpe	United Kingdom	65.58	65.16	64.46	65.58	
12	Róbert Laduver	Hungary	64.15	64.40	64.84	64.84	
13	Stuart Farquhar	New Zealand	x	64.57	x	64.57	
14	Ronald Noguera	Venezuela	63.55	62.81	61.95	63.55	
15	Vladimir Petrichenko	Ukraine	61.00	62.04	63.31	63.31	
16	Matthew Murdock	Canada	60.00	58.74	58.11	60.00	
17	Goran Vuković	Croatia	56.39	57.52	52.94	57.52	

== Participation ==
According to an unofficial count, 33 athletes from 25 countries participated in the event.

- Argentina (1)
- Australia (2)
- Brazil (1)
- Canada (2)
- China (1)
- Chinese Taipei (1)
- Croatia (1)
- Finland (2)
- France (2)
- Germany (2)
- Greece (1)
- Hungary (1)
- Japan (1)
- Latvia (2)
- Lithuania (1)
- New Zealand (1)
- Norway (1)
- Qatar (1)
- Russia (1)
- Slovenia (1)
- South Africa (2)
- South Korea (2)
- Ukraine (1)
- United Kingdom (1)
- Venezuela (1)
