= 2006 European Athletics Championships – Men's javelin throw =

Men's javelin throw at the European Athletics Championships

The Men's Javelin Throw event at the 2006 European Championships in Gothenburg, Sweden had a total number of 24 participating athletes. The final was held on Wednesday August 9, 2006, and the qualifying round on Monday August 7, 2006 with the mark set at 81.00 metres.

== Medalists ==
Gold	Andreas Thorkildsen; Norway (NOR)
Silver	Tero Pitkämäki; Finland (FIN)
Bronze	Jan Železný; Czech Republic (CZE)

== Schedule ==
- All times are Eastern European Time (UTC+2)

Qualification Round
Group A	Group B
07.08.2006 – 18:30h	07.08.2006 – 19:30h
Final Round
09.08.2006 – 19:10h

== Abbreviations ==
Q	automatic qualification
q	qualification by rank
DNS	did not start
NM	no mark
WR	world record
AR	area record
NR	national record
PB	personal best
SB	season best

== Records ==
Standing records prior to the 2002 European Athletics Championships
World Record	Jan Železný (CZE)	98.48 m	May 25, 1996	Jena, Germany
Event Record	Steve Backley (GBR)	89.72 m	August 23, 1998	Budapest, Hungary

== Qualification ==
=== Group A ===
Rank	Overall	Athlete	Attempts			Distance	Note
Rank	Overall	Athlete	1	2	3	Distance	Note
1	1	Andreas Thorkildsen (NOR)	74.25	86.55	—	86.55 m	
2	6	Aleksandr Ivanov (RUS)	72.88	81.57	—	81.57 m	
3	8	Jan Železný (CZE)	80.60	X	X	80.60 m	
4	11	Nick Nieland (GBR)	80.40	X	X	80.40 m	
5	12	Ēriks Rags (LAT)	76.70	78.54	79.24	79.24 m	
6	13	Teemu Wirkkala (FIN)	79.05	X	77.85	79.05 m	
7	14	Christian Nicolay (GER)	77.94	75.29	72.60	77.94 m	
8	15	Daniel Ragnvaldsson (SWE)	76.71	73.13	X	76.71 m	
9	16	Yeóryios Íltsios (GRE)	75.88	74.00	X	75.88 m	
10	22	Felix Loretz (SUI)	67.50	65.13	70.83	70.83 m	
11	23	Francesco Pignata (ITA)	69.84	X	70.37	70.37 m	
12	24	Vadim Bavikin (ISR)	66.67	66.93	X	66.93 m	

=== Group B ===
Rank	Overall	Athlete	Attempts			Distance	Note
Rank	Overall	Athlete	1	2	3	Distance	Note
1	2	Ainārs Kovals (LAT)	79.03	76.36	85.95	85.95 m	PB
2	3	Vadims Vasiļevskis (LAT)	84.68	—	—	84.68 m	
3	4	Tero Pitkämäki (FIN)	83.78	—	—	83.78 m	
4	5	Peter Esenwein (GER)	82.71	—	—	82.71 m	
5	7	Stefan Wenk (GER)	80.90	X	77.54	80.90 m	
6	9	Magnus Arvidsson (SWE)	80.45	75.59	—	80.45 m	
7	10	Stefan Müller (SUI)	78.64	75.45	80.43	80.43 m	NR
8	17	Tero Järvenpää (FIN)	75.21	X	72.38	75.21 m	
9	18	Tomas Intas (LTU)	74.76	73.19	72.10	74.76 m	
10	19	Risto Mätas (EST)	74.58	X	73.87	74.58 m	
11	20	Marián Bokor (SVK)	71.80	X	72.54	72.54 m	
12	21	Ronny Nilsen (NOR)	71.37	70.58	67.10	71.37 m	

== Final ==
Rank	Athlete	Attempts						Distance	Note
Rank	Athlete	1	2	3	4	5	6	Distance	Note
1st place, gold medalist(s)	Andreas Thorkildsen (NOR)	82.84	87.37	85.30	87.35	86.39	88.78	88.78 m	
2nd place, silver medalist(s)	Tero Pitkämäki (FIN)	86.44	81.44	82.87	82.68	X	84.71	86.44 m	
3rd place, bronze medalist(s)	Jan Železný (CZE)	85.92	X	X	X	X	X	85.92 m	
4	Vadims Vasiļevskis (LAT)	76.21	83.21	X	X	X	81.13	83.21 m	
5	Ainārs Kovals (LAT)	81.65	79.19	78.23	79.56	77.31	79.75	81.65 m	
6	Peter Esenwein (GER)	81.11	76.46	X	73.73	76.45	80.45	81.11 m	
7	Stefan Müller (SUI)	80.87	78.38	78.16	75.72	76.08	75.52	80.87 m	NR
8	Aleksandr Ivanov (RUS)	78.68	80.09	77.99	X	76.61	73.99	80.09 m	
9	Ēriks Rags (LAT)	79.51	X	X				79.51 m	
10	Magnus Arvidsson (SWE)	78.53	73.94	X				78.53 m	
11	Nick Nieland (GBR)	75.66	X	76.92				76.92 m	
12	Stefan Wenk (GER)	X	75.71	75.00				75.71 m	

== See also ==
- 2004 Men's Olympic Javelin Throw (Athens)
- 2005 Men's World Championships Javelin Throw (Helsinki)
- 2007 Men's World Championships Javelin Throw (Osaka)
- 2008 Men's Olympic Javelin Throw (Beijing)
