= 2003 European Athletics U23 Championships – Men's javelin throw =

The men's javelin throw event at the 2003 European Athletics U23 Championships was held in Bydgoszcz, Poland, at Zawisza Stadion on 18 and 20 July.

== Medalists ==
Gold	Aleksandr Ivanov; Russia
Silver	Igor Janik; Poland
Bronze	Tero Pitkämäki; Finland

== Results ==
=== Final ===
20 July

Rank	Name	Nationality	Attempts						Result	Notes
Rank	Name	Nationality	1	2	3	4	5	6	Result	Notes
1st place, gold medalist(s)	Aleksandr Ivanov	Russia	80.66	79.91	82.59	x	x	x	82.59	
2nd place, silver medalist(s)	Igor Janik	Poland	82.54	79.18	–	–	78.22	x	82.54	
3rd place, bronze medalist(s)	Tero Pitkämäki	Finland	78.21	77.81	74.85	75.60	78.84	77.81	78.84	
4	Andreas Thorkildsen	Norway	76.95	76.38	72.33	75.52	x	74.33	76.95	
5	Stephan Steding	Germany	69.76	70.61	76.72	73.75	74.89	x	76.72	
6	Ainārs Kovals	Latvia	68.56	67.06	72.68	70.77	69.83	x	72.68	
7	Vadims Vasiļevskis	Latvia	72.39	69.94	69.03	x	x	69.26	72.39	
8	Peter Zupanc	Slovenia	65.01	x	68.21	65.49	68.43	67.59	68.43	
9	Jānis Liepa	Latvia	x	67.41	63.42				67.41	
10	Vadzim Yautukhovich	Belarus	x	64.15	67.08				67.08	
11	Seppo Hirvonen	Finland	x	66.80	x				66.80	
12	Tomas Intas	Lithuania	x	x	63.94				63.94	

=== Qualifications ===
18 July
Qualifying 77.50 or 12 best to the Final

==== Group A ====
Rank	Name	Nationality	Result	Notes
1	Andreas Thorkildsen	Norway	76.15	q
2	Tero Pitkämäki	Finland	75.77	q
3	Stephan Steding	Germany	74.61	q
4	Vadims Vasiļevskis	Latvia	73.07	q
5	Vadzim Yautukhovich	Belarus	70.79	q
6	Tomas Intas	Lithuania	70.64	q
7	Saku Kuusisto	Finland	70.61	
8	Gabriel Wallin	Sweden	68.30	
9	Róbert Laduver	Hungary	66.71	
10	Jérôme Haeffler	France	65.61	

==== Group B ====
Rank	Name	Nationality	Result	Notes
1	Aleksandr Ivanov	Russia	78.99	Q
2	Igor Janik	Poland	74.42	q
3	Ainārs Kovals	Latvia	71.74	q
4	Jānis Liepa	Latvia	71.50	q
5	Peter Zupanc	Slovenia	71.35	q
6	Seppo Hirvonen	Finland	71.17	q
7	Yeoryios Iltsios	Greece	70.44	
8	Magnus Arvidsson	Sweden	69.19	
9	Bérenger Demerval	France	66.81	
10	Bart Debacker	Belgium	63.05	

== Participation ==
According to an unofficial count, 20 athletes from 14 countries participated in the event.

- Belarus (1)
- Belgium (1)
- Finland (3)
- France (2)
- Germany (1)
- Greece (1)
- Hungary (1)
- Latvia (3)
- Lithuania (1)
- Norway (1)
- Poland (1)
- Russia (1)
- Slovenia (1)
- Sweden (2)
