= 2009 World Championships in Athletics – Men's javelin throw =

The men's javelin throw at the 2009 World Championships in Athletics was held at the Olympic Stadium in Berlin, Germany on August 21 and August 23. The second qualification group was interrupted for one hour, after the 2nd throw, due to heavy rain.

== Medalists ==
Gold	Andreas Thorkildsen; Norway (NOR)
Silver	Guillermo Martínez; Cuba (CUB)
Bronze	Yukifumi Murakami; Japan (JPN)

== Schedule ==
- All times are Central European Time (UTC+1)

Qualification Round
Group A	Group B
21.08.2009 – 16:15h	21.08.2009 – 18:15h
Final Round
23.08.2009 – 16:20h

== Qualification standards ==
A standard	B standard
81.00 m	78.00 m

== Abbreviations ==
- All results shown are in metres

Q	automatic qualification
q	qualification by rank
DNS	did not start
NM	no mark
WR	world record
AR	area record
NR	national record
PB	personal best
SB	season best

== Records ==
Standing records prior to the 2009 World Athletics Championships
World record	Jan Železný (CZE)	98.48	Jena, Germany	25 May 1996
Championship record	Jan Železný (CZE)	92.80	Edmonton, Canada	12 August 2001
World leading	Andreas Thorkildsen (NOR)	91.28	Zürich, Switzerland	28 August 2009
African record	Marius Corbett (RSA)	88.75	Kuala Lumpur, Malaysia	21 September 1998
Asian record	Kazuhiro Mizoguchi (JPN)	87.60	San Jose, United States	27 May 1989
North American record	Breaux Greer (USA)	91.29	Indianapolis, United States	21 June 2007
South American record	Edgar Baumann (PAR)	84.70	San Marcos, United States	17 October 1999
European record	Jan Železný (CZE)	98.48	Jena, Germany	25 May 1996
Oceanian record	Jarrod Bannister (AUS)	89.02	Brisbane, Australia	29 February 2008

== Results ==
=== Qualification ===
Qualification: Qualifying Performance 82.00 (Q) or at least 12 best performers (q) advance to the final.

Rank	Group	Athlete	Nationality	#1	#2	#3	Result	Notes
1	B	Vadims Vasiļevskis	Latvia	86.69			86.69	Q
2	A	Yukifumi Murakami	Japan	74.87	83.10		83.10	Q, PB
3	A	Guillermo Martínez	Cuba	x	76.69	82.50	82.50	Q
4	A	Tero Pitkämäki	Finland	80.96	x	81.65	81.65	q
5	B	Mark Frank	Germany	79.04	80.85	–	80.85	q
6	A	Andreas Thorkildsen	Norway	x	80.37	79.93	80.37	q
7	B	Teemu Wirkkala	Finland	76.82	79.84	79.23	79.84	q
8	A	Ainārs Kovals	Latvia	79.76	x	x	79.76	q
9	B	Petr Frydrych	Czech Republic	79.57	78.14	72.73	79.57	q
10	A	Tero Järvenpää	Finland	77.22	x	79.48	79.48	q
11	B	Sean Furey	United States	x	74.51	79.28	79.28	q, SB
12	B	Antti Ruuskanen	Finland	78.61	78.69	76.82	78.69	q
13	A	Sergey Makarov	Russia	78.68	x	78.47	78.68	
14	B	Stuart Farquhar	New Zealand	72.84	74.54	78.53	78.53	
15	A	Csongor Olteán	Hungary	74.75	x	78.46	78.46	
16	A	Mihkel Kukk	Estonia	72.63	76.70	78.18	78.18	
17	A	Mike Hazle	United States	x	76.98	78.17	78.17	
18	A	Park Jae-Myong	South Korea	75.62	76.17	78.16	78.16	
19	B	Fatih Avan	Turkey	78.12	x	68.12	78.12	
20	B	Alexandr Ivanov	Russia	x	77.13	78.00	78.00	
21	A	Qin Qiang	China	76.87	75.40	77.65	77.65	
22	A	Roman Avramenko	Ukraine	73.85	76.46	77.44	77.44	
23	B	Tom Goyvaerts	Belgium	77.37	x	73.62	77.37	
24	B	Chris Hill	United States	70.23	75.20	77.14	77.14	
25	A	Aliaksandr Ashomka	Belarus	72.83	76.85	76.04	76.85	
26	A	Ēriks Rags	Latvia	76.23	x	75.97	76.23	
27	B	Oleksandr Pyatnytsya	Ukraine	76.13	75.61	x	76.13	
28	A	Vítězslav Veselý	Czech Republic	75.16	75.76	69.48	75.76	
29	B	Uladzimir Kazlou	Belarus	x	73.17	75.38	75.38	
30	A	Jonas Lohse	Sweden	x	75.33	74.46	75.33	
31	B	Igor Janik	Poland	75.20	x	x	75.20	
32	A	Melik Janoyan	Armenia	68.74	74.74	72.75	74.74	SB
33	A	Adrian Markowski	Poland	68.84	72.87	74.13	74.13	
34	A	Tino Häber	Germany	73.66	74.11	73.64	74.11	
35	A	Stefan Müller	Switzerland	71.09	71.63	72.83	72.83	
36	B	Jung Sang-Jin	South Korea	x	72.80	x	72.80	
37	B	Arley Ibargüen	Colombia	69.49	72.54	x	72.54	
38	B	Ilya Korotkov	Russia	71.59	70.37	x	71.59	
39	A	Thomas Smet	Belgium	70.35	x	68.23	70.35	
40	B	Mohamed Ali Kebabou	Egypt	64.68	68.75	–	68.75	
41	A	Víctor Fatecha	Paraguay	66.31	68.65	65.93	68.65	
42	B	Júlio César de Oliveira	Brazil	67.85	68.49	x	68.49	
43	A	Tomas Intas	Lithuania	68.40	x	x	68.40	
44	B	John Robert Oosthuizen	South Africa	67.86	x	67.57	67.86	
45	B	Mervyn Luckwell	Great Britain & N.I.	65.02	61.42	66.30	66.30	
	B	Ignacio Guerra	Chile	x	x	x	NM	
	B	Tanel Laanmäe	Estonia	x	x	-	NM	
	B	Andrus Värnik	Estonia				DNS	

=== Final ===
Rank	Athlete	Nationality	#1	#2	#3	#4	#5	#6	Result	Notes
1st place, gold medalist(s)	Andreas Thorkildsen	Norway	77.80	89.59	88.95	x	-	-	89.59	SB
2nd place, silver medalist(s)	Guillermo Martínez	Cuba	83.43	83.28	78.22	77.27	-	86.41	86.41	SB
3rd place, bronze medalist(s)	Yukifumi Murakami	Japan	76.01	82.97	x	x	-	77.90	82.97	
4	Vadims Vasilevskis	Latvia	x	x	82.05	x	x	82.37	82.37	
5	Tero Pitkämäki	Finland	81.90	81.14	80.50	x	80.17	81.14	81.90	
6	Antti Ruuskanen	Finland	75.36	75.67	81.87	78.65	x	80.87	81.87	
7	Ainārs Kovals	Latvia	x	81.54	x	x	75.98	76.39	81.54	
8	Mark Frank	Germany	73.77	79.86	x	x	x	81.32	81.32	
9	Teemu Wirkkala	Finland	79.76	x	79.82				79.82	
10	Petr Frydrych	Czech Republic	78.57	x	79.29				79.29	
11	Tero Järvenpää	Finland	75.43	x	75.57				75.57	
12	Sean Furey	United States	73.18	74.51	73.77				74.51	
