= Finland at the 2009 World Championships in Athletics =

- WA code: FIN
- National federation: Suomen Urheiluliitto RY
- Website: http://www.sul.fi/index.php?Lang=ENG

in Berlin
- Competitors: 20
- Medals: Gold 0 Silver 0 Bronze 0 Total 0

World Championships in Athletics appearances
- 1976; 1980; 1983; 1987; 1991; 1993; 1995; 1997; 1999; 2001; 2003; 2005; 2007; 2009; 2011; 2013; 2015; 2017; 2019; 2022; 2023; 2025

Finland competed at the 2009 World Championships in Athletics, 15–23 August 2009. A team of 20 athletes was announced in preparation for the competition. The selected athletes had achieved at least one of the competition's qualifying standards. The team failed to win any medals; defending world champion javelin thrower Tero Pitkämäki managed only a fifth-place finish.

== Team selection ==
Track and road events

Event	Athletes	
Event	Men	Women
400 metres hurdles	Jussi Heikkilä	
3000 m steeplechase	Jukka Keskisalo	Sandra Eriksson
50 km race walk	Jarkko Kinnunen	—

Field and combined events

Event	Athletes	
Event	Men	Women
Pole vault	Eemeli Salomäki	Minna Nikkanen; Vanessa Vandy (withdrawn)
High jump	Oskari Frösén	Hanna Grobler
Long jump	Tommi Evilä	
Discus throw	Frantz Kruger	
Hammer throw	Olli-Pekka Karjalainen; David Söderberg	Merja Korpela
Javelin throw	Tero Järvenpää; Tero Pitkämäki; Antti Ruuskanen; Teemu Wirkkala; Ari Mannio (reserve)	Mikaela Ingberg

== Results ==
=== Men ===
Track and road events

Event	Athletes	Heat round 1		Heat round 2		Semifinal		Final	
Event	Athletes	Result	Rank	Result	Rank	Result	Rank	Result	Rank
400 m hurdles	Jussi Heikkilä	51.42	25	did not advance					
3000 m steeplechase	Jukka Keskisalo	8:22.00	13					8:14.47	8
50 km walk	Jarkko Kinnunen							3:47:36 PB	9

Field events

Event	Athletes	Qualification		Final	
Event	Athletes	Result	Rank	Result	Rank
Long jump	Tommi Evilä	801	14	did not advance	
High jump	Oskari Frösén	224	20	did not advance	
Pole vault	Eemeli Salomäki	540	22	did not advance	
Discus throw	Frantz Kruger	62.29	12	59.77	12
Javelin throw	Tero Järvenpää	79.48	10	75.57	11
Javelin throw	Tero Pitkämäki	81.65	4	81.90	5
Javelin throw	Antti Ruuskanen	78.69	12	81.87	6
Javelin throw	Teemu Wirkkala	79.84	7	79.82	9
Hammer throw	Olli-Pekka Karjalainen	74.09	16	did not advance	
Hammer throw	David Söderberg	73.69	18	did not advance	

=== Women ===
Track and road events

Event	Athletes	Heat round 1		Heat round 2		Semifinal		Final	
Event	Athletes	Result	Rank	Result	Rank	Result	Rank	Result	Rank
3000 m steeplechase	Sandra Eriksson	9:46.62 PB	31	did not advance					

Field and combined events

Event	Athletes	Qualification		Final	
Event	Athletes	Result	Rank	Result	Rank
High jump	Hanna Grobler	189	21	did not advance	
Pole vault	Minna Nikkanen	4.40	20	did not advance	
Javelin throw	Mikaela Ingberg	57.88	14	did not advance	
Hammer throw	Merja Korpela	68.34	20	did not advance	

== See also ==
- 2009 Finnish Athletics Championships
