= Athletics at the 2005 Summer Universiade – Men's javelin throw =

The men's javelin throw event at the 2005 Summer Universiade was held on 15–17 August in İzmir, Turkey.

== Medalists ==
Gold	Silver	Bronze
Ainārs Kovals; Latvia	Tero Järvenpää; Finland	Stefan Müller; Switzerland

== Results ==
=== Qualification ===
Rank	Group	Athlete	Nationality	Result	Notes
1	B	Tero Järvenpää	Finland	78.94	Q
2	B	Lohan Rautenbach	South Africa	78.59	Q
3	A	Ainārs Kovals	Latvia	77.01	Q
4	A	Tomas Intas	Lithuania	76.36	Q
5	B	Igor Janik	Poland	76.27	Q
6	B	Marián Bokor	Slovakia	75.71	q
7	B	Francesco Pignata	Italy	75.68	q
8	A	Vladislav Shkurlatov	Russia	75.16	q
9	A	Petteri Leinonen	Finland	73.61	q
10	A	Stefan Müller	Switzerland	73.30	q
11	A	Kristo Galeta	Estonia	71.50	q
12	A	Chou Yi-Chen	Chinese Taipei	71.11	q
13	B	Trevor Snyder	Canada	70.53	
14	B	Risto Mätas	Estonia	70.52	
15	B	Kazuki Yamamoto	Japan	70.29	
16	B	Lars Møller Laursen	Denmark	70.05	SB
17	B	Jung Sang-Jin	South Korea	69.55	
18	B	Vadzim Yautukhovich	Belarus	69.42	
19	A	Willie Human	South Africa	68.18	
20	B	Şevket Taş	Turkey	65.57	
21	A	Mehdi Ravaei	Iran	65.30	
22	?	Mikalai Vasiltsou	Belarus	63.93	
23	?	Kolyo Neshev	Bulgaria	63.01	
24	?	Melik Janoyan	Armenia	60.13	
25	?	Johan Smallberger	New Zealand	59.76	
26	?	Jesús Andrés Dueñas	Peru	58.43	
27	?	Dinesh Perera	Sri Lanka	55.81	
28	?	Phikisani Lokwalo	Botswana	52.83	
29	?	Georges Assak	Lebanon	52.19	
30	?	Naji Hammoud	Lebanon	50.26	
	?	Rostomi Chincharauli	Georgia	DNS	

=== Final ===
Rank	Athlete	Nationality	#1	#2	#3	#4	#5	#6	Result	Notes
1st place, gold medalist(s)	Ainārs Kovals	Latvia	x	77.07	75.81	76.27	80.67	79.67	80.67	
2nd place, silver medalist(s)	Tero Järvenpää	Finland	75.43	76.87	77.22	76.60	79.61	x	79.61	
3rd place, bronze medalist(s)	Stefan Müller	Switzerland	75.24	72.54	75.11	75.90	78.57	77.04	78.57	
4	Vladislav Shkurlatov	Russia	76.84	76.54	75.98	76.62	76.43	76.50	76.84	
5	Igor Janik	Poland	70.48	75.98	73.70	72.64	71.49	72.68	75.98	
6	Francesco Pignata	Italy	75.80	72.64	72.72	x	75.01	74.91	75.80	
7	Lohan Rautenbach	South Africa	74.89	72.63	69.81	73.07	73.69	73.73	74.89	
8	Marián Bokor	Slovakia	73.64	70.33	69.54	x	71.06	x	73.64	
9	Chou Yi-Chen	Chinese Taipei	73.59	65.18	70.15				73.59	
10	Tomas Intas	Lithuania	72.58	x	71.32				72.58	
11	Kristo Galeta	Estonia	68.73	70.35	66.71				70.35	
12	Petteri Leinonen	Finland	68.43	70.04	68.96				70.04	
