= Athletics at the 2003 Summer Universiade – Men's javelin throw =

The men's javelin throw event at the 2003 Summer Universiade was held on 27 August in Daegu, South Korea.

== Results ==
Rank	Athlete	Nationality	#1	#2	#3	#4	#5	#6	Result	Notes
1st place, gold medalist(s)	Igor Janik	Poland	76.83	74.25	x	x	–	–	76.83	
2nd place, silver medalist(s)	Esko Mikkola	Finland	68.46	70.06	x	75.82	x	73.19	75.82	
3rd place, bronze medalist(s)	William Hamlyn-Harris	Australia	74.81	73.75	70.49	74.51	x	75.50	75.50	
4	Park Jae-myong	South Korea	73.50	72.43	69.28	70.27	74.72	72.80	74.72	
5	Gerhardus Pienaar	South Africa	70.81	70.43	71.61	71.98	71.33	74.41	74.41	
6	Francesco Pignata	Italy	70.35	70.00	69.69	x	x	73.85	73.85	
7	Stefan Müller	Switzerland	73.78	68.16	69.26	x	66.98	x	73.78	
8	Shin Kyung-ha	South Korea	66.19	x	69.19	x	67.87	62.92	69.19	
9	Nick Bennett	Australia	66.73	60.15	64.13				66.73	
10	Stephan Steding	Germany	63.30	64.28	65.91				65.91	
11	Willie Human	South Africa	62.38	x	64.97				64.97	
12	Liu Zhengang	China	60.39	62.34	62.79				62.79	
13	Felix Iloki	Republic of the Congo	51.18	36.09	45.86				51.18	
14	Kouadio Benoît Lingue	Ivory Coast	46.99	50.61	x				50.61	
15	Sufian Al-Basher	Sudan	45.83	45.21	46.75				46.75	
16	Sisomphone Vongphakdy	Laos	x	x	39.73				39.73	
	Adelard-Otanda Kinimalibo	Democratic Republic of the Congo							DNS	
