= Stefan Wenk =

German javelin thrower

Stefan Wenk (born 13 March 1981 in Filderstadt, Baden-Württemberg) is a male javelin thrower from Germany. His personal best throw is 83.94 metres, achieved in June 2006 at Bislett stadion.

== Achievements ==
Year	Competition	Venue	Position	Notes
Representing Germany
2000	World Junior Championships	Santiago, Chile	9th	65.68 m
2001	European U23 Championships	Amsterdam, Netherlands	7th	71.91 m
2006	European Championships	Gothenburg, Sweden	12th	75.71 m
2006	World Athletics Final	Stuttgart, Germany	8th	76.34 m

== Seasonal bests by year ==
- 2000 - 73.06
- 2001 - 78.65
- 2002 - 81.20
- 2003 - 79.42
- 2004 - 82.95
- 2005 - 83.07
- 2006 - 83.94
- 2007 - 80.34
- 2008 - 75.53
