= Andreas Thorkildsen =

Norwegian javelin thrower

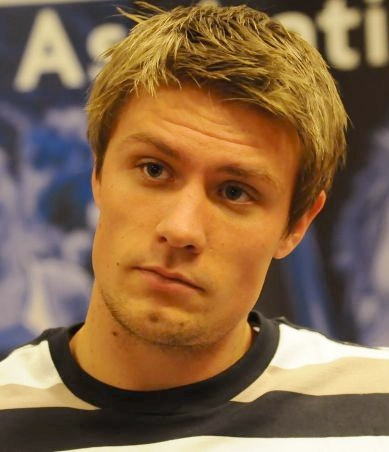
- Thorkildsen in 2008

Personal information
- Nationality: Norwegian
- Born: 1 April 1982 (age 44) Kristiansand, Norway
- Height: 1.88 m (6 ft 2 in)
- Weight: 90 kg (198 lb)

Sport
- Country: Norway
- Sport: Track and field
- Event: Javelin throw
- Club: Kristiansands IF
- Coached by: Åsmund Martinsen

Achievements and titles
- Personal bests: NR 91.59 m (2006)
Medal record
Representing Norway
Olympic Games
| Gold medal – first place | 2004 Athens | Javelin |
| Gold medal – first place | 2008 Beijing | Javelin |
World Championships
| Gold medal – first place | 2009 Berlin | Javelin |
| Silver medal – second place | 2005 Helsinki | Javelin |
| Silver medal – second place | 2007 Osaka | Javelin |
| Silver medal – second place | 2011 Daegu | Javelin |
European Championships
| Gold medal – first place | 2006 Gothenburg | Javelin |
| Gold medal – first place | 2010 Barcelona | Javelin |
Representing Europe
Continental Cup
| Gold medal – first place | 2010 Split | Javelin |

Andreas Thorkildsen (born 1 April 1982) is a retired Norwegian track and field athlete who competed in the javelin throw. He was the Olympic Champion in 2004 and 2008, European Champion in 2006 and 2010, and World Champion in 2009. He is the first male javelin thrower in history to simultaneously be European, World and Olympic Champion. He was also a three-time silver medalist at the World Championships, placing second in 2005, 2007 and 2011. His personal best of 91.59 m, set in 2006, is the Norwegian record.

== Personal life ==
Thorkildsen's father Tomm Thorkildsen is a former javelin thrower, achieving a personal best throw of 71.64 metres in 1974. His mother Bente (née Amundsen) became national champion in the 100 metres hurdles in 1972, representing Hamar IL. He has one older brother. He took his secondary education at Kristiansand Cathedral School.

Relationship with Christina Vukicevic

Thorkildsen's relationship with the Norwegian hurdler Christina Vukicevic generated some unwanted publicity on his part. When Thorkildsen and Vukicevic won kongepokalen for men and women respectively at the 2006 Norwegian championships, Thorkildsen left the stadium to avoid photographers, whom he had shown the finger the previous day. In March 2011 Vukicevic and Thorkildsen announced in the Norwegian media that they no longer were a couple.

Modelling

In 2007, Thorkildsen performed as a fashion model for former footballer Martin Dahlin, fronting his winter and autumn collections.

== Career ==
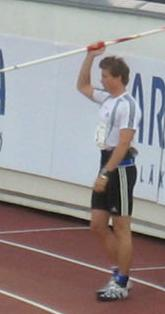
Thorkildsen at the GE Money Grand Prix in Helsinki, July 2005

Thorkildsen took up javelin throwing at the age of 11, and was coached by his father Tomm until 1999. He established numerous national boys' records as a teenager. In 1996 he set a national record for the 14 years' class (53.82 m), in 1998 for the 16 years' class (61.57 m), in 1999 for the 17 years' class (72.11 m), and in 2000 a record for the 18 years' class (77.48 m). In 1999 he finished seventh at the European Junior Championships.

In 2000 Thorkildsen took his first medal at the Norwegian championships, finishing in silver medal position behind Ronny Nilsen. His form earned Thorkildsen his first call-up to the Norwegian European Cup team. In October he participated at the World Junior Championships and received a silver medal behind winner Gerhardus Pienaar from South Africa.

=== 2001–2003 ===
In 2001 Thorkildsen moved to Oslo and started competing for the club SK Vidar under coach Åsmund Martinsen, a former javelin thrower who won the bronze medal at the 1994 Norwegian Championships, and had a career best throw of 68.12 metres. The cooperation proved fruitful as Thorkildsen soon broke the 80 metre barrier, throwing 83.87 metres at Fana stadion in June. This was a world junior record till 2011. Participating in his second European Junior Championships, he won a silver medal behind Aleksandr Ivanov. Both competed at the World Championships in Edmonton, but while Ivanov managed to reach the final, Thorkildsen finished last in the entire competition with only 68.41 metres. When asked to comment on his own throwing he described it as "completely awful".

At the national level Thorkildsen became Norwegian champion for the first time. In August he competed in a discus throw meet at Sognsvann, establishing a personal best of 38.02 metres. He has not competed on national level in other athletic events.

In 2002, he recorded a season best of 83.43 metres in June before witnessing his form gradually declining over the next months. At his first European Championships, which were held in August in Munich, he again failed to progress from the qualifying round. With a best throw of 78.36 metres he finished fifteenth overall, 68 centimetres behind Ari Pakarinen who secured the last spot in the final. Although Thorkildsen only managed to take silver at the Norwegian championships behind Pål Arne Fagernes, his result of 83.43 metres was enough to front the national top list in javelin throw for the first time.

Next year he finished eleventh at the 2003 World Championships in Paris, his first major international final. His performance and throw of 77.75 metres was slightly disappointing as he had thrown 79.44 metres in the qualifying round, having travelled to Paris with a personal best of 85.72 metres, established in June in Ventspils. On the lighter side he took his second national title, consolidating his spot as Norway's leading javelin thrower.

=== 2004 ===
In 2004 Thorkildsen faced competition from Ronny Nilsen, who threw 84.73 metres in May. Although Thorkildsen did not retake the national number one spot right away, he did display increasing form in the preparations for the Olympic Games. He qualified for the Olympics with an 84.12 m throw at the Bergen Bislett Games, an event which was won by Breaux Greer with a North American record and world leading throw of 87.39 metres. On 27 July Thorkildsen took his first victory in an IAAF Grand Prix meet, beating Breaux Greer by a comfortable margin at the DN Galan meet in Stockholm. Three days later he improved his season best to 84.45 metres at the London Grand Prix at Crystal Palace.

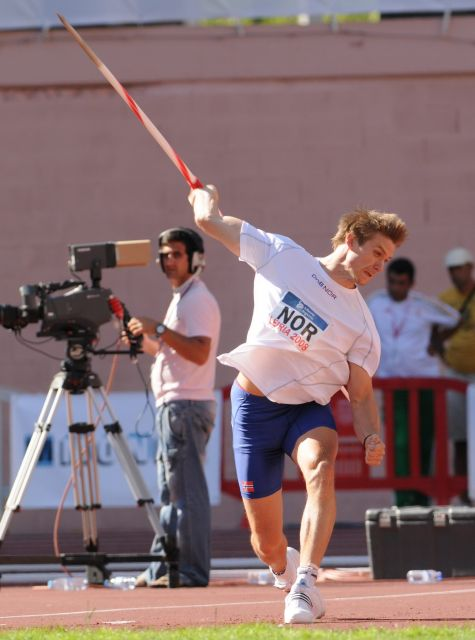
Throwing at the European Cup

Even though several throwers, including Nilsen, still towered above Thorkildsen on the world list, the Olympic javelin contest was regarded as widely open – "one of the most open finals in Olympic history", according to the IAAF Olympic coverage. Thorkildsen threw 81.74 m in the qualification round, barely earning a mention in the event report as he safely passed the automatic qualifier mark of 81 metres to go through to the final. Breaux Greer won the qualification with 87.25 m, but left the stadium in a limping state. In the javelin final held two days later, Thorkildsen opened with an 84.82 m release which saw him ranked third at the end of the first round. Vadims Vasiļevskis of Latvia had thrown a personal best of 84.95 m to earn a surprising lead ahead of reigning World champion Sergey Makarov. In the second round Thorkildsen threw a personal best of 86.50 metres. As neither Aleksandr Ivanov, Greer nor anyone else managed to beat this, Thorkildsen won a surprising Olympic gold medal with Vasiļevskis and Makarov staying in place to take the silver and bronze medals respectively. Thorkildsen became the second Norwegian man to win the Olympic gold medal in javelin throw, after Egil Danielsen in 1956. Commenting on his win, Thorkildsen described the feeling as "completely insane". A second place behind Breaux Greer at the World Athletics Final in Monte Carlo rounded off the season.

=== 2005 ===
The most important event of 2005 was the World Championships. The preparations for this event looked promising for Thorkildsen as he improved his personal best to 86.82 metres in Kuortane in June, beating the Norwegian record of Pål Arne Fagernes. Tero Pitkämäki from Finland, who achieved a world leading result of 91.53 metres in the same competition, seemed a likely contender for the world champion title. In July, When Thorkildsen further improved his national record to 87.66 metres at the Bislett Games, reigning world champion Sergey Makarov had already thrown 90.33 metres two weeks earlier at the Russian Championships in Tula. Going into the World Championships, Pitkämäki was still in first place on the world top list ahead of Makarov and Thorkildsen, who in turn was ahead of Breaux Greer by one centimetre.

In the qualification round at the World Championships, held in windy conditions on the Helsinki Olympic Stadium, only Pitkämäki, Makarov and Thorkildsen managed to beat the automatic qualification mark of 81 metres. Rain supplemented the wind the following day, constituting difficult weather conditions for the javelin final. Thorkildsen, in the lead after three rounds with 86.18 metres, eventually finished in silver medal position behind Andrus Värnik of Estonia as the latter threw 87.17 metres in the fourth round.

Pitkämäki, who finished a disappointing fourth at the World Championships, bounced back to win the World Athletics Final ahead of Thorkildsen, despite the latter improving his national record to 89.60 metres. 89.60 metres was enough to finish third on the world top list that season, behind Pitkämäki and Makarov.

=== 2006–2008 ===
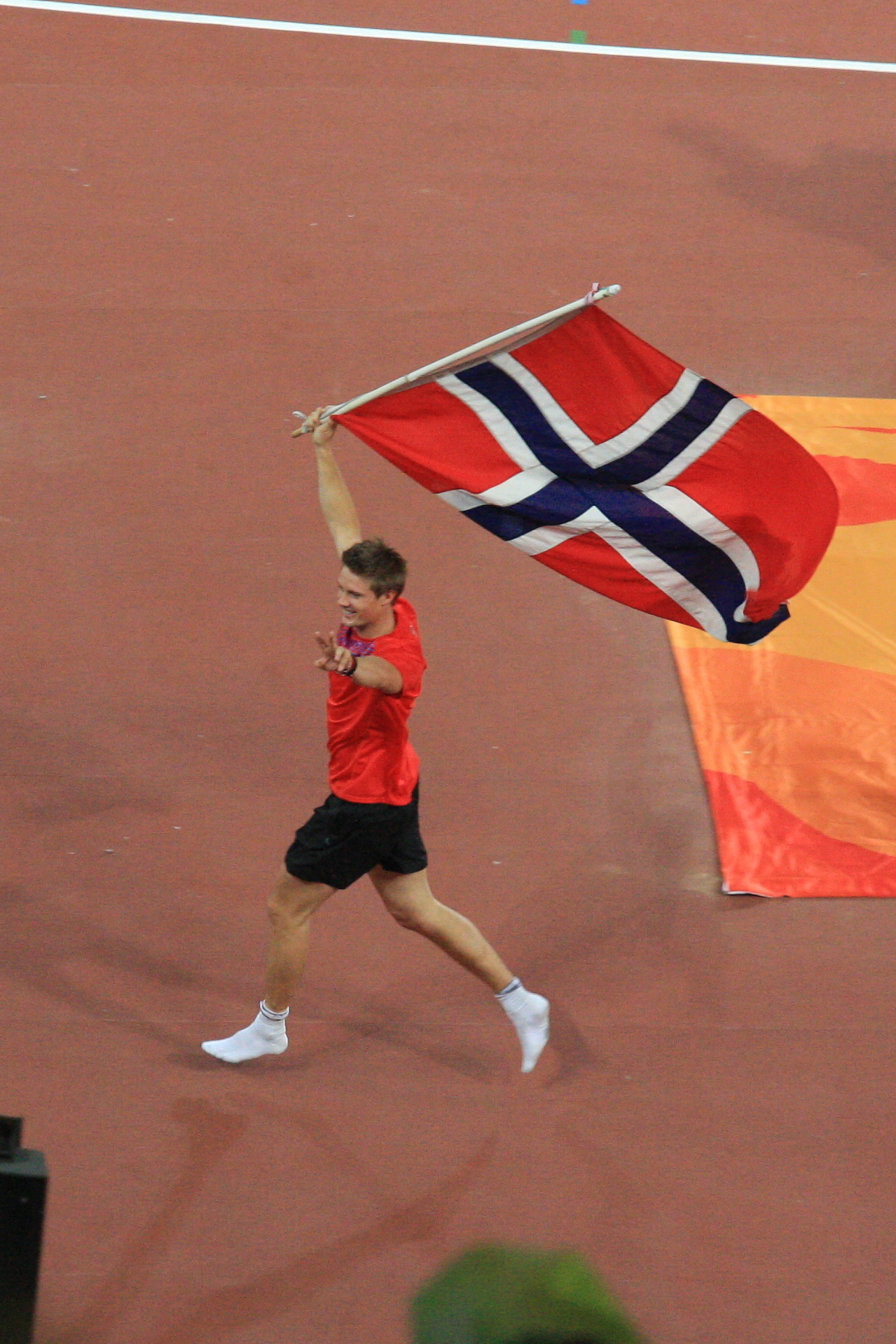
Thorkildsen celebrating his gold medal in Beijing

In 2006 Thorkildsen returned to his original club Kristiansands IF, having represented SK Vidar in competitions the five previous seasons. In May he broke the 90 metre barrier for the first time, with 90.13 metres from the Doha Super Grand Prix. At the Bislett Games he yet again improved his record to 91.59 metres, reaching his goal of 300 feet. As no one managed to top his 91.59 metre result, he entered the 2006 European Championships as a favorite, together with Tero Pitkämäki who had won the IAAF Golden League meet in Paris. Thorkildsen won the event with 88.78 metres, having led the competition since the second round. Thorkildsen finished the season by winning his first World Athletics Final as well as the 2006 IAAF World Cup. With 91.59 metres he finished on top of the world list for the first time.

Thorkildsen's main goals for the 2007 season were the Bislett Games and the 2007 World Championships in Osaka, as well as winning the Golden League jackpot. In addition he aimed to beat the old record of Terje Pedersen, who threw 91.72 metres with the old javelin implement, by throwing in the range of 93 to 94 metres. The season started in a mediocre manner as he threw 81.10 metres in Dakar and 86.39 m in Doha. He recovered his form at the world championships, but once again could only achieve a silver medal, this time losing to Pitkämäki finally fulfilling his potential with a throw of 90.33 (though he'd already been assured the medal by this point).

In 2008 Thorkildsen won the Golden League event at Bislett in Oslo, his main goal besides the 2008 Summer Olympics in Beijing. He won a gold medal in the Olympics where he set a new Olympic record with 90.57 metres. Thorkildsen dominated the competition, leading it from his first throw and making the two longest throws in the competition without using his last attempt. All of his 5 throws would have given a medal. Thorkildsen also won the javelin competition of the 2008 IAAF Golden League in Zürich on 29 August.

=== 2009–2016 ===
He became the first male javelin thrower in history to hold all three titles of European champion, World champion and Olympic champion, winning IAAF World Championship in Berlin with 89.59 m. Thorkildsen also had the season's leading throw, with 91.28 m achieved in Zürich on 28 August.

He opened his 2010 season with a large throw of 90.37 metres at the Florö Track & Field Festival in May and went on to score a victory over Pitkämäki in their first match up in the 2010 IAAF Diamond League at the Bislett Games, finishing with a best throw of 86.00 m. On 31 July he defended his European title with a throw of 88.37, finishing ahead of second-placed Matthias de Zordo. De Zordo got his revenge next year when he won World Championship on 3 September at Daegu with Thorkildsen finishing second with a throw of 84.78.

In 2012 Thorkildsen finished fourth at European Championships in Helsinki only managing three throws with the best result of 81.55 metres after picking up an injury during warm-up. This was the first time since 2003 that Thorkildsen failed to win a medal at a major championship. At the 2012 Summer Olympics in London he threw 82.63 and finished sixth which became fifth several years later after disqualification of the original silver medalist Oleksandr Pyatnytsya for doping offence. Next year's World Championships at Moscow brought Thorkildsen a sixth place with a throw of 81.06 in what turned out to be his last appearance at a major championship competition. Injuries forced him to bring his 2014 season to a premature end before the European Championships. He later decided to sit out the entire 2015 season but aimed at comeback in 2016. However, in May 2016 Thorkildsen announced his retirement from sports.

== Awards ==
At the end of 2004 Thorkildsen was selected Norwegian Sportsperson of the Year by Norwegian sports journalists.

In 2008 he was awarded the European Athlete of the Year trophy by the European Athletic Association, announced on 2 October 2008, and to be presented at the European Athletics Awards Dinner in Amsterdam on 18 October. The Association cited Thorkildsen's success at the Beijing Olympics and his breaching of the 90-metre barrier as part of their reasoning for the award.

== Seasonal bests by year ==
- 1998 – 61.57
- 1999 – 72.11
- 2000 – 77.48
- 2001 – 83.87
- 2002 – 83.43
- 2003 – 85.72
- 2004 – 86.50
- 2005 – 89.60
- 2006 – 91.59
- 2007 – 89.51
- 2008 – 90.57
- 2009 – 91.28
- 2010 – 90.37
- 2011 – 90.61
- 2012 – 84.72
- 2013 – 84.64
- 2014 – 80.52

Awards
| Preceded by Petter Solberg | Norwegian Sportsperson of the Year; 2004 | Succeeded by Marit Bjørgen |
| Preceded by Aksel Lund Svindal | Norwegian Sportsperson of the Year; 2008 | Succeeded by Petter Northug |
| Preceded by Tero Pitkämäki | Men's European Athlete of the Year; 2008 | Succeeded by Phillips Idowu |
