= Ronny Nilsen =

Norwegian javelin thrower

Personal information
- Full name: Ronny Nilsen
- Born: 7 May 1971 (age 55) Åsane, Norway

Sport
- Sport: Athletics, javelin
- Club: IL Norna-Salhus

Achievements and titles
- National finals: 2

Ronny Nilsen (born 7 May 1971 in Åsane, Bergen) is a former Norwegian track and field athlete who competed in the javelin. He represented the Hordaland club IL Norna-Salhus. After terminating his sports career he had several engagements as sports administrator in the Norwegian Athletics Association

He took part in the 2004 Olympics in Athens, 2005 World Championships in Helsinki and the 2006 European Athletics Championships in Gothenburg, but failed to get past the qualification rounds.

Nilsen has a personal best of 84.73 meters (278.0 ft), which places him third on the Norwegian all-time list, behind Andreas Thorkildsen and Pål Arne Fagernes. He competed for the club IL Norna-Salhus.

Nilsen is a graduate of the Norwegian Police University College, and for many years worked in the Oslo police force, later he was senior advisor at NAV. from 2008 to 2015 he was the head of sport at Norwegian Athletics Association. From March 2026 he became secretary general of the Norwegian Athletics Associacion.

== Achievements ==
| Year | Competition | Venue | Position | Notes |
|---|---|---|---|---|
| 2004 | Olympic Games | Athens, Greece | 27th | 73.46 m |
| 2005 | World Championships | Helsinki, Finland | 26th | 70.07 m |
| 2006 | European Championships | Gothenburg, Sweden | 21st | 71.37 m |

== Medals at Norwegian championship ==
Nilsen has nine national medals in javelin, including two national titles.

| Placing | Event | Year |
|---|---|---|
| Gold | Javelin | 2000 and 2007 |
| Silver | Javelin | 1996, 1997, 2003, 2004 and 2006 |
| Bronze | Javelin | 1999 and 2002 |
