= 2005 World Championships in Athletics – Men's javelin throw =

The Men's Javelin Throw event at the 2005 World Championships in Athletics was held at the Helsinki Olympic Stadium on August 9 and August 10.

== Medalists ==
Gold	Andrus Värnik; Estonia (EST)
Silver	Andreas Thorkildsen; Norway (NOR)
Bronze	Sergey Makarov; Russia (RUS)

== Schedule ==
- All times are Eastern European Time (UTC+2)

Qualification Round
Group A	Group B
09.08.2005 – 11:45h	09.08.2005 – 13:20h
Final Round
10.08.2005 – 20:20h

== Abbreviations ==
- All results shown are in metres

Q	automatic qualification
q	qualification by rank
DNS	did not start
NM	no mark
WR	world record
AR	area record
NR	national record
PB	personal best
SB	season best

== Startlist ==
Athlete	Group	Number	SB	PB
Tero Pitkämäki (FIN)	B	6	91.53 m	91.53 m
Sergey Makarov (RUS)	A	5	90.33 m	92.61 m
Andreas Thorkildsen (NOR)	A	7	87.66 m	87.66 m
Andrus Värnik (EST)	B	15	87.19 m	87.83 m
Scott Russell (CAN)	B	9	84.41 m	84.41 m
Alexandr Ivanov (RUS)	B	7	84.24 m	88.90 m
Guillermo Martínez (CUB)	A	12	84.06 m	84.06 m
Aki Parviainen (FIN)	A	10	83.79 m	93.09 m
Christian Nicolay (GER)	B	12	83.20 m	84.54 m
Mark Frank (GER)	A	1	82.38 m	83.24 m
Ēriks Rags (LAT)	A	15	82.35 m	86.47 m
Ainārs Kovals (LAT)	B	8	82.22 m	82.22 m
Esko Mikkola (FIN)	B	11	82.14 m	84.27 m
Tomas Intas (LTU)	A	13	82.04 m	82.94 m
Francesco Pignata (ITA)	A	8	81.67 m	81.67 m
Li Rongxiang (CHN)	B	14	81.61 m	84.29 m
Vadims Vasilevskis (LAT)	B	3	81.30 m	84.95 m
Gergely Horváth (HUN)	A	16	80.91 m	81.55 m
Gabriel Wallin (SWE)	A	9	80.31 m	80.71 m
Lohan Rautenbach (RSA)	B	13	80.03 m	80.03 m
Yukifumi Murakami (JPN)	B	1	79.79 m	81.71 m
Nick Nieland (GBR)	A	2	79.56 m	85.09 m
Stefan Müller (SUI)	A	4	78.98 m	78.98 m
Ronny Nilsen (NOR)	B	5	78.93 m	84.73 m
John Hetzendorf (USA)	B	10	78.23 m	78.23 m
Oleg Statsenko (UKR)	A	11	78.02 m	79.44 m
Marián Bokor (SVK)	A	6	77.79 m	83.38 m
Vadim Bavikin (ISR)	B	2	77.57 m	81.94 m
Firas Al-Mohamed (SYR)	A	14	72.63 m	80.50 m
Dejan Angelovski (MKD)	B	4	58.23 m	76.50 m

== Records ==
Standing records prior to the 2005 World Athletics Championships
World Record	Jan Železný (CZE)	98.48 m	May 25, 1996	Jena, Germany
Event Record	Jan Železný (CZE)	92.80 m	August 12, 2001	Edmonton, Canada
Season Best	Tero Pitkämäki (FIN)	91.53 m	June 26, 2005	Kuortane, Finland

== Qualification ==
=== Group A ===
Rank	Overall	Athlete	Attempts			Result	Note
Rank	Overall	Athlete	1	2	3	Result	Note
1	1	Sergey Makarov (RUS)	85.08	—	—	85.08 m	
2	3	Andreas Thorkildsen (NOR)	81.45	—	—	81.45 m	
3	7	Aki Parviainen (FIN)	79.48	X	—	79.48 m	
4	9	Ēriks Rags (LAT)	78.79	X	X	78.79 m	
5	10	Guillermo Martínez (CUB)	75.28	78.37	X	78.37 m	
6	11	Mark Frank (GER)	76.76	73.08	77.87	77.87 m	
7	12	Tomas Intas (LTU)	77.08	X	X	77.08 m	
8	13	Nick Nieland (GBR)	74.61	76.62	76.71	76.71 m	
9	15	Stefan Müller (SUI)	76.30	71.54	69.93	76.30 m	
10	19	Marián Bokor (SVK)	74.27	74.70	74.81	74.81 m	
11	20	Firas Al-Mohamed (SYR)	72.63	X	X	72.63 m	SB
12	22	Gergely Horváth (HUN)	67.04	72.33	71.81	72.33 m	
13	23	Francesco Pignata (ITA)	71.13	72.17	66.96	72.17 m	
14	24	Gabriel Wallin (SWE)	68.72	63.50	72.04	72.04 m	
15	29	Oleg Statsenko (UKR)	X	X	64.44	64.44 m	
16	31	Shaka Sola (SAM)	38.31	41.18	—	41.18 m	PB

=== Group B ===
Rank	Overall	Athlete	Attempts			Result	Note
Rank	Overall	Athlete	1	2	3	Result	Note
1	2	Tero Pitkämäki (FIN)	82.21	—	—	82.21 m	
2	4	Andrus Värnik (EST)	74.83	X	80.97	80.97 m	
3	5	Ainārs Kovals (LAT)	X	80.80	78.05	80.80 m	
4	6	Alexandr Ivanov (RUS)	79.65	76.00	—	79.65 m	
5	8	Scott Russell (CAN)	79.45	77.11	X	79.45 m	
6	14	Christian Nicolay (GER)	76.68	X	72.35	76.68 m	
7	16	Vadims Vasilevskis (LAT)	75.76	X	76.16	76.16 m	
8	17	Lohan Rautenbach (RSA)	X	75.94	X	75.94 m	
9	18	Li Rongxiang (CHN)	74.95	X	X	74.95 m	
10	21	Esko Mikkola (FIN)	71.87	72.54	71.50	72.54 m	
11	25	John Hetzendorf (USA)	X	70.16	70.49	70.49 m	
12	26	Ronny Nilsen (NOR)	70.07	—	—	70.07 m	
13	27	Yukifumi Murakami (JPN)	X	67.84	68.31	68.31 m	
14	28	Vadim Bavikin (ISR)	66.03	66.74	X	66.74 m	
15	30	Dejan Angelovski (MKD)	56.66	58.23	55.83	58.23 m	SB

== Final ==
Rank	Athlete	Attempts						Distance	Note
Rank	Athlete	1	2	3	4	5	6	Distance	Note
1st place, gold medalist(s)	Andrus Värnik (EST)	79.06	X	76.47	87.17	85.29	X	87.17 m	
2nd place, silver medalist(s)	Andreas Thorkildsen (NOR)	78.36	81.52	83.41	85.71	86.18	X	86.18 m	
3rd place, bronze medalist(s)	Sergey Makarov (RUS)	80.77	83.30	79.95	83.48	82.55	83.54	83.54 m	
4	Tero Pitkämäki (FIN)	75.44	X	79.64	81.27	X	X	81.27 m	
5	Alexandr Ivanov (RUS)	77.93	79.14	X	X	X	77.12	79.14 m	
6	Ēriks Rags (LAT)	73.12	78.77	X	X	X	77.34	78.77 m	
7	Ainārs Kovals (LAT)	74.05	X	77.61	X	X	X	77.61 m	
8	Mark Frank (GER)	75.82	73.19	71.17	X	77.56	X	77.56 m	
9	Aki Parviainen (FIN)	74.86	70.88	X				74.86 m	
10	Guillermo Martínez (CUB)	72.68	69.42	X				72.68 m	
11	Tomas Intas (LTU)	X	X	70.11				70.11 m	
12	Scott Russell (CAN)	62.33	X	68.59				68.59 m	
