= Magnus Arvidsson (javelin thrower) =

Swedish javelin thrower

Magnus Arvidsson (born 20 February 1983) is a retired Swedish track and field athlete who competed in the javelin throw.

He finished tenth at the 2006 European Championships, tenth at the 2007 World Championships, third at the 2007 World Athletics Final and eleventh at the 2008 Olympic Games.

His personal best is 85.75 metres (281.3 ft), set in Osaka in May 2007, the second longest throw ever by a Swedish javelin thrower, behind only Patrik Bodén's national record.

Arvidsson retired at the age of 28 in April 2011.

== Achievements ==
Year	Competition	Venue	Position	Notes
Representing Sweden
2002	World Junior Championships	Kingston, Jamaica	22nd (q)	62.57 m (205.3 ft)
2003	European U23 Championships	Bydgoszcz, Poland	15th (q)	69.19 m (227.0 ft)
2005	European U23 Championships	Erfurt, Germany	3rd	76.15 m (249.8 ft)
2006	European Championships	Gothenburg, Sweden	10th	78.53 m (257.6 ft)
2007	IAAF World Athletics Final	Stuttgart, Germany	3rd	83.37 m (273.5 ft)
2008	Olympic Games	Beijing, PR China	11th	80.16 m (263.0 ft)

== Seasonal bests by year ==
- 2000 - 50.99 m (167.3 ft)
- 2001 - 63.84 m (209.4 ft)
- 2002 - 69.90 m (229.3 ft)
- 2003 - 70.08 m (229.9 ft)
- 2004 - 73.98 m (242.7 ft)
- 2005 - 77.83 m (255.3 ft)
- 2006 - 81.75 m (268.2 ft)
- 2007 - 85.75 m (281.3 ft)
- 2008 - 83.28 m (273.2 ft)
- 2009 - 77.41 m (254.0 ft)
