= 2001 European Athletics U23 Championships – Men's javelin throw =

The men's javelin throw event at the 2001 European Athletics U23 Championships was held in Amsterdam, Netherlands, at Olympisch Stadion on 13 and 14 July.

== Medalists ==
Gold	Björn Lange; Germany
Silver	Aleksandr Baranovskiy; Russia
Bronze	Jānis Liepa; Latvia

== Results ==
=== Final ===
14 July

Rank	Name	Nationality	Attempts						Result	Notes
Rank	Name	Nationality	1	2	3	4	5	6	Result	Notes
1st place, gold medalist(s)	Björn Lange	Germany	73.81	73.31	75.06	74.55	80.85	77.90	80.85	
2nd place, silver medalist(s)	Aleksandr Baranovskiy	Russia	76.42	x	74.21	73.51	76.74	75.92	76.74	
3rd place, bronze medalist(s)	Jānis Liepa	Latvia	70.72	68.89	71.54	73.36	72.31	74.26	74.26	
4	Ainārs Kovals	Latvia	73.22	68.32	70.32	68.78	71.36	69.23	73.22	
5	Marcel Plautz	Germany	71.71	70.06	69.42	72.14	69.38	73.11	73.11	
6	Pauli Piiparinen	Finland	72.19	69.92	67.47	66.26	x	67.43	72.19	
7	Stefan Wenk	Germany	71.91	68.46	x	69.59	68.93	x	71.91	
8	Tomas Intas	Lithuania	x	71.29	x	x	x	68.93	71.29	
9	David Parker	United Kingdom	69.78	x	x				69.78	
10	Vadzim Yautukhovich	Belarus	67.07	67.27	69.12				69.12	
11	Stefan Müller	Switzerland	68.95	x	64.52				68.95	
12	Andis Anškins	Latvia	68.92	68.42	x				68.92	

=== Qualifications ===
13 July
Qualifying 76.00 or 12 best to the Final

==== Group A ====
Rank	Name	Nationality	Result	Notes
1	Aleksandr Baranovskiy	Russia	77.37	Q
2	Jānis Liepa	Latvia	74.90	q
3	Marcel Plautz	Germany	73.45	q
4	Pauli Piiparinen	Finland	72.95	q
5	Stefan Wenk	Germany	71.85	q
6	Andis Anškins	Latvia	70.93	q
7	Vadzim Yautukhovich	Belarus	69.34	q
8	Peter Mulder	Netherlands	66.11	
9	Dan Carter	United Kingdom	65.47	
	Matthias Eriksson	Sweden	NM	

==== Group B ====
Rank	Name	Nationality	Result	Notes
1	Björn Lange	Germany	75.61	q
2	David Parker	United Kingdom	75.16	q
3	Ainārs Kovals	Latvia	74.55	q
4	Tomas Intas	Lithuania	73.77	q
5	Stefan Müller	Switzerland	71.18	q
6	Bronisław Korda	Poland	68.44	
7	Mikael Snällfot	Sweden	68.38	
8	Michal Šafář	Czech Republic	68.25	
9	Robert Laduver	Hungary	67.53	
10	Luc Duquerroy	France	64.46	

== Participation ==
According to an unofficial count, 20 athletes from 14 countries participated in the event.

- Belarus (1)
- Czech Republic (1)
- Finland (1)
- France (1)
- Germany (3)
- Hungary (1)
- Latvia (3)
- Lithuania (1)
- Netherlands (1)
- Poland (1)
- Russia (1)
- Sweden (2)
- Switzerland (1)
- United Kingdom (2)
