= Stuart Farquhar =

New Zealand javelin thrower

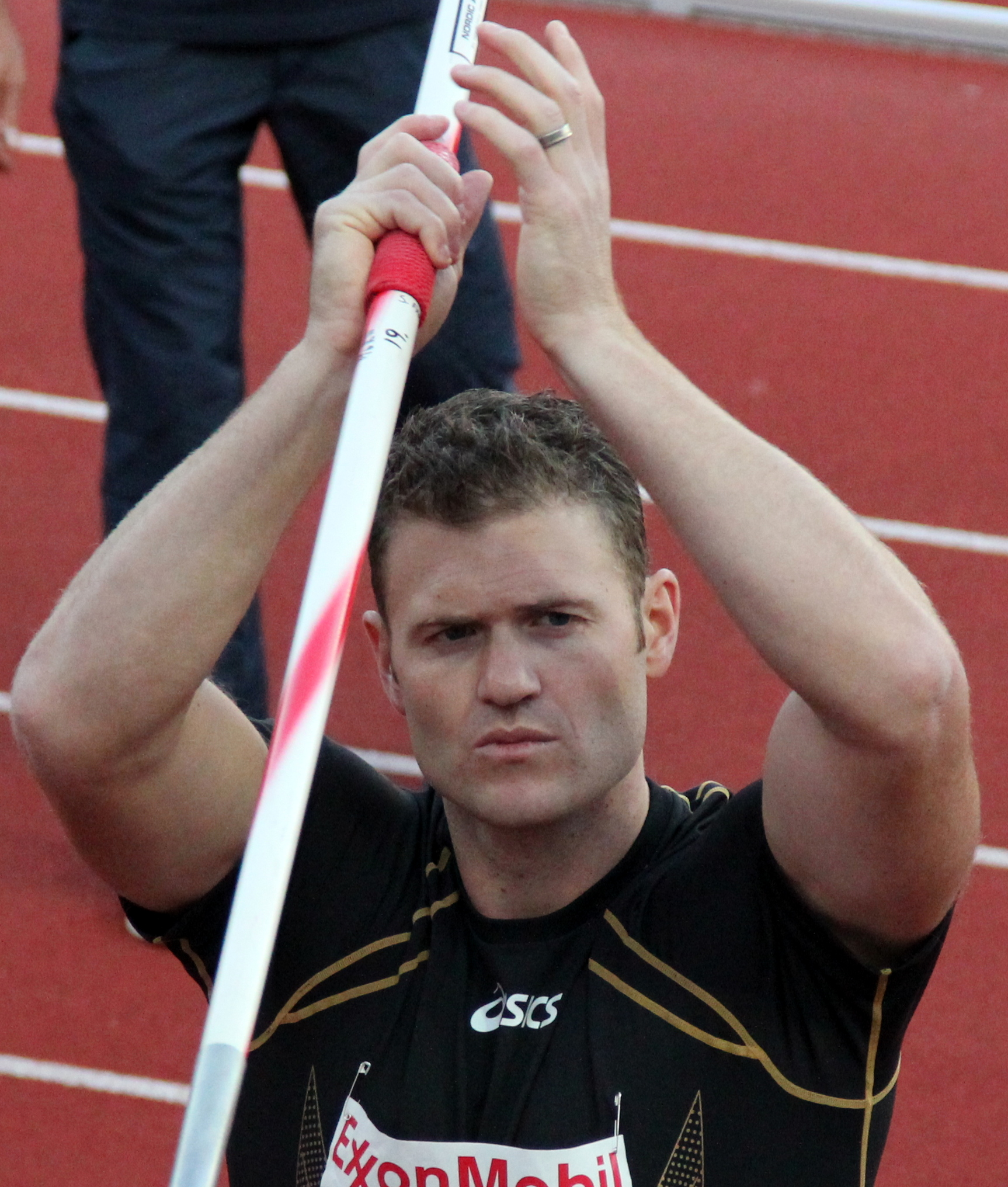
- Farquhar at the 2012 Bislett Games

Personal information
- Full name: Stuart James Farquhar
- Born: 15 March 1982 (age 44) Te Aroha, Waikato, New Zealand
- Height: 1.87 m (6 ft 2 in)
- Weight: 98 kg (216 lb)

Sport
- Country: New Zealand
- Sport: Athletics
- Event: Javelin
Medal record
Commonwealth Games
Silver medal – second place	2010 Delhi	javelin
Oceania Youth Championships
Silver medal – second place	1997 Suva	Javelin
- Updated on 14 June 2015

Stuart James Farquhar (born 15 March 1982) is a male javelin thrower from New Zealand. He was the silver medallist in the men's javelin at the 2010 Commonwealth Games.

Farquhar is a twelve time New Zealand National Javelin Champion. In April 2012, he recorded a new personal best of 86.31 metres in Hiroshima, Japan.

He finished sixth at the 2006 IAAF World Cup. He competed at the 2004 Summer Olympics without reaching the final. He improved on his previous Olympic result by finishing 20th at the 2008 Summer Olympics in Beijing, China.

Farquhar finished 8th in the men's javelin final at the 2012 Summer Olympics with a throw of 80.22 metres, his original position 9th was upgraded in 2016 after second placed Oleksandr Pyatnytsya was disqualified for doping upon retesting of his samples.

== Achievements ==
Year	Competition	Venue	Position	Event	Notes
Representing New Zealand
1997	Oceania Youth Championships	Suva, Fiji	2nd	Javelin (700 g)	52.54 m
1998	World Junior Championships	Annecy, France	15th (q)	Javelin	63.82 m
2000	World Junior Championships	Santiago, Chile	26th (q)	Javelin	64.57 m
2004	Olympic Games	Athens, Greece	25th (q)	Javelin	74.63 m
2006	Commonwealth Games	Melbourne, Australia	7th	Javelin	77.40 m
2007	World Championships	Osaka, Japan	19th (q)	Javelin	78.08 m
2008	Olympic Games	Beijing, China	20th (q)	Javelin	76.14 m
2009	Universiade	Belgrade, Serbia	2nd	Javelin	79.48 m
2009	World Championships	Berlin, Germany	14th (q)	Javelin	78.53 m
2010	Commonwealth Games	Delhi, India	2nd	Javelin	78.15 m
2011	World Championships	Daegu, South Korea	11th	Javelin	78.99 m
2012	Olympic Games	London, England	8th	Javelin	80.22 m
2013	World Championships	Moscow, Russia	9th	Javelin	79.24 m
2014	Commonwealth Games	Glasgow, United Kingdom	5th	Javelin	78.14 m
2015	World Championships	Beijing, China	23rd (q)	Javelin	78.30 m
2016	Olympic Games	Rio de Janeiro, Brazil	29th (q)	Javelin	77.32 m

== Seasonal bests by year ==
- 1998 – 63.82
- 2000 – 72.22
- 2002 – 78.51
- 2003 – 76.41
- 2004 – 79.68
- 2005 – 72.14
- 2006 – 81.70
- 2007 – 78.08
- 2008 – 83.23
- 2009 – 80.16
- 2010 – 85.35
- 2011 – 84.21
- 2012 – 86.31
- 2013 – 81.07
- 2014 – 79.69
- 2015 – 82.75
- 2016 – 83.93
