= Peter Esenwein =

German javelin thrower

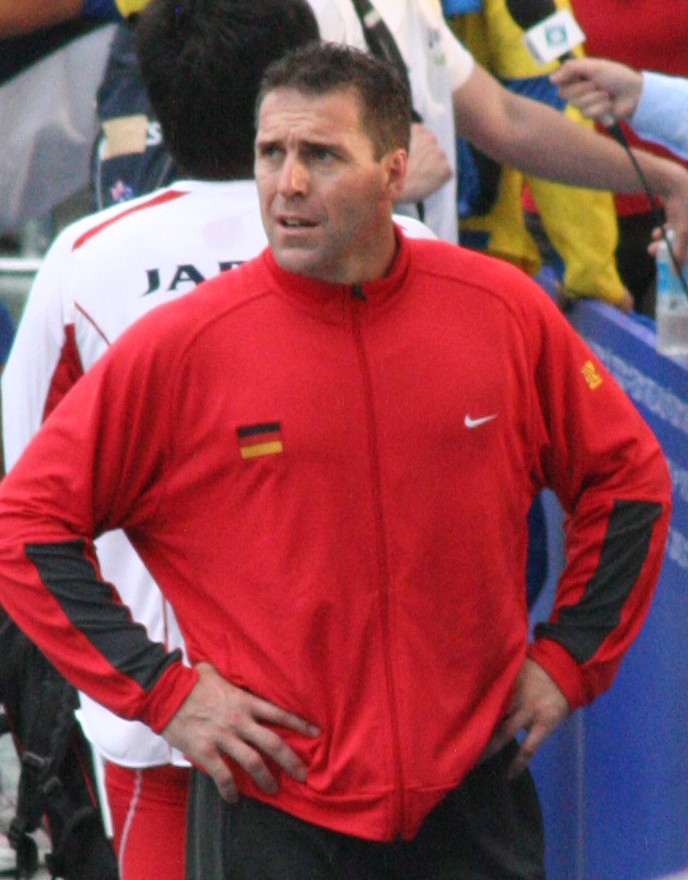
- Esenwein at the 2007 World Championships in Athletics

Personal information
- Born: 7 December 1967 (age 58) Göppingen, West Germany

Sport
- Sport: Track and field

Peter Esenwein (born 7 December 1967) is a German javelin thrower.

In the 2004 Summer Olympics he was eliminated in the first round of the javelin throw competition.

He finished sixth at the 2006 European Championships and third at the 2006 World Athletics Final.

His personal best throw is 87.20 metres, achieved in May 2004 in Rehlingen. This ranked him fourth among German javelin (new implement) throwers, behind Raymond Hecht, Boris Henry and Peter Blank. All but Hecht were displaced by the new crop of German throwers in 2017 and 2018, Johannes Vetter, Thomas Röhler and Andreas Hofmann.

== Achievements ==
Year	Competition	Venue	Position	Notes
1995	Universiade	Fukuoka, Japan	11th	70.52 m
2004	Olympic Games	Athens, Greece	20th (q)	78.41 m
2006	European Championships	Gothenburg, Sweden	6th	81.11 m
2007	World Championships	Osaka, Japan	13th (q)	79.62 m

== Seasonal bests by year ==
- 1997 - 85.60
- 1998 - 84.17
- 2000 - 84.79
- 2001 - 81.74
- 2002 - 82.97
- 2003 - 83.03
- 2004 - 87.20
- 2005 - 77.20
- 2006 - 85.30
- 2007 - 82.78
- 2008 - 82.72
- 2009 - 79.15
- 2010 - 77.47
- 2012 - 75.75
- 2013 - 74.15
