= 2007 World Championships in Athletics – Men's javelin throw =

The Men's Javelin Throw event at the 2007 World Championships in Athletics took place on August 31, 2007 (qualification round) and 2 September 2007 (final round) at the Nagai Stadium in Osaka, Japan. There were a total number of 36 competing athletes from 22 countries.

== Medalists ==
Gold	Tero Pitkämäki; Finland (FIN)
Silver	Andreas Thorkildsen; Norway (NOR)
Bronze	Breaux Greer; United States (USA)

== Schedule ==
- All times are Japan Standard Time (UTC+9)

Qualification Round
Group A	Group B
31.08.2007 – 09:30h	31.08.2007 – 11:30h
Final Round
02.09.2007 – 19:15h

== Abbreviations ==
Q	automatic qualification
q	qualification by rank
DNS	did not start
NM	no mark
WR	world record
AR	area record
NR	national record
PB	personal best
SB	season best

== Records ==
Standing records prior to the 2007 World Athletics Championships
World Record	Jan Železný (CZE)	98.48 m	May 25, 1996	Jena, Germany
Event Record	Jan Železný (CZE)	92.80 m	August 12, 2001	Edmonton, Canada
Season Best	Breaux Greer (USA)	91.29 m	June 21, 2007	Indianapolis, United States

== Qualification ==
=== Group A ===
Place	Athlete	Nation	1	2	3	Mark	Notes
1	Breaux Greer	United States	64.49	79.67	86.78	86.78	Q
2	Tero Järvenpää	Finland	84.35			84.35	Q SB
3	Magnus Arvidsson	Sweden	84.17			84.17	Q
4	Andreas Thorkildsen	Norway	X	82.33		82.33	Q
5	Teemu Wirkkala	Finland	75.52	X	79.82	79.82	q
6	Ēriks Rags	Latvia	X	X	79.79	79.79	q
7	Gerhardus Pienaar	South Africa	76.09	79.30	78.05	79.30	
8	Igor Sukhomlinov	Russia	79.05	74.83	X	79.05	
9	Joshua Robinson	Australia	75.11	76.93	78.48	78.48	
10	Sergey Makarov	Russia	78.22	77.71	74.42	78.22	
11	Stuart Farquhar	New Zealand	71.89	78.08	73.34	78.08	SB
12	Pablo Pietrobelli	Argentina	72.36	74.81	74.60	74.81	
13	Stephan Steding	Germany	67.32	X	74.61	74.61	
14	Miroslav Guzdek	Czech Republic	74.13	72.41	69.43	74.13	
15	Stefan Müller	Switzerland	X	71.48	X	71.48	
16	Marko Jänes	Estonia	X	68.64	69.65	69.65	
17	Csongor Olteán	Hungary	X	64.44	X	64.44	

=== Group B ===
Place	Athlete	Nation	1	2	3	Mark	Notes
1	Vadims Vasilevskis	Latvia	X	72.80	87.37	87.37	Q
2	Guillermo Martínez	Cuba	82.99			82.99	Q
3	Aleksandr Ivanov	Russia	X	79.66	82.42	82.42	Q
4	John Robert Oosthuizen	South Africa	X	82.06		82.06	Q
5	Igor Janik	Poland	80.83	77.61	-	80.83	q
6	Tero Pitkämäki	Finland	80.62	78.54	X	80.62	q
7	Peter Esenwein	Germany	73.74	70.89	79.62	79.62	
8	Ainārs Kovals	Latvia	X	77.18	79.42	79.42	
9	Qin Qiang	China	77.71	74.96	74.95	77.71	
10	Yukifumi Murakami	Japan	70.23	77.63	75.73	77.63	SB
11	Jarrod Bannister	Australia	77.57	X	77.44	77.57	
12	Scott Russell	Canada	73.67	75.35	77.54	77.54	
13	Andrus Värnik	Estonia	X	75.96	X	75.96	SB
14	Alexon Maximiano	Brazil	68.89	70.57	75.15	75.15	
15	Víctor Fatecha	Paraguay	71.59	73.55	70.01	73.55	
16	Eric Brown	United States	70.38	X	73.07	73.07	
17	Felix Loretz	Switzerland	71.27	70.57	67.79	71.27	
18	Gabriel Wallin	Sweden	X	X	70.61	70.61	

== Final ==
Field reduced to top eight are three throws, with top eight entitled to a further three attempts.

Rank	Athlete	Nation	Attempts						Distance	Note
Rank	Athlete	Nation	1	2	3	4	5	6	Distance	Note
1st place, gold medalist(s)	Tero Pitkämäki	Finland	81.62	89.16	83.64	87.72	X	90.33	90.33 m	
2nd place, silver medalist(s)	Andreas Thorkildsen	Norway	82.78	88.61	X	82.80	X	87.33	88.61 m	
3rd place, bronze medalist(s)	Breaux Greer	United States	X	80.67	84.31	X	86.21	83.81	86.21 m	
4	Vadims Vasilevskis	Latvia	X	85.19	X	77.42	X	X	85.19 m	
5	Aleksandr Ivanov	Russia	85.18	84.71	81.42	84.91	81.55	X	85.18 m	
6	John Robert Oosthuizen	South Africa	84.52	79.77	X	79.18	X	X	84.52 m	PB
7	Igor Janik	Poland	79.82	X	83.38	X	—	X	83.38 m	PB
8	Tero Järvenpää	Finland	80.30	79.40	82.10	X	77.30	75.40	82.10 m	
9	Guillermo Martínez	Cuba	82.03	81.19	X				82.03 m	
10	Magnus Arvidsson	Sweden	79.80	X	81.98				81.98 m	
11	Ēriks Rags	Latvia	X	77.22	80.01				80.01 m	
12	Teemu Wirkkala	Finland	78.01	X	76.48				78.01 m	
