= Marián Bokor =

Slovak javelin thrower

Marián Bokor (born 17 April 1977) is a Slovak javelin thrower. His personal best is 83.38 metres, achieved in July 2000 in Nitra.

He finished eighth at the 2005 Summer Universiade. In addition he competed at the 2005 World Championships and the Olympic Games in 2000 and 2004 without reaching the final.

== Competition record ==
Year	Competition	Venue	Position	Notes
Representing Slovakia
1999	European U23 Championships	Gothenburg, Sweden	9th	70.69 m
2000	Olympic Games	Sydney, Australia	27th (q)	75.49 m
2004	Olympic Games	Athens, Greece	32nd (q)	71.74 m
2005	World Championships	Helsinki, Finland	19th (q)	74.81 m
2005	Universiade	İzmir, Turkey	8th	73.64 m
2006	European Championships	Gothenburg, Sweden	20th (q)	72.54 m

== Seasonal bests by year ==
- 2000 – 83.38
- 2002 – 76.91
- 2003 – 76.09
- 2004 – 80.72
- 2005 – 77.79
- 2006 – 81.91
- 2007 – 75.49
- 2008 – 74.19
- 2009 – 73.49
