= Guillermo Martínez (javelin thrower) =

Cuban javelin thrower

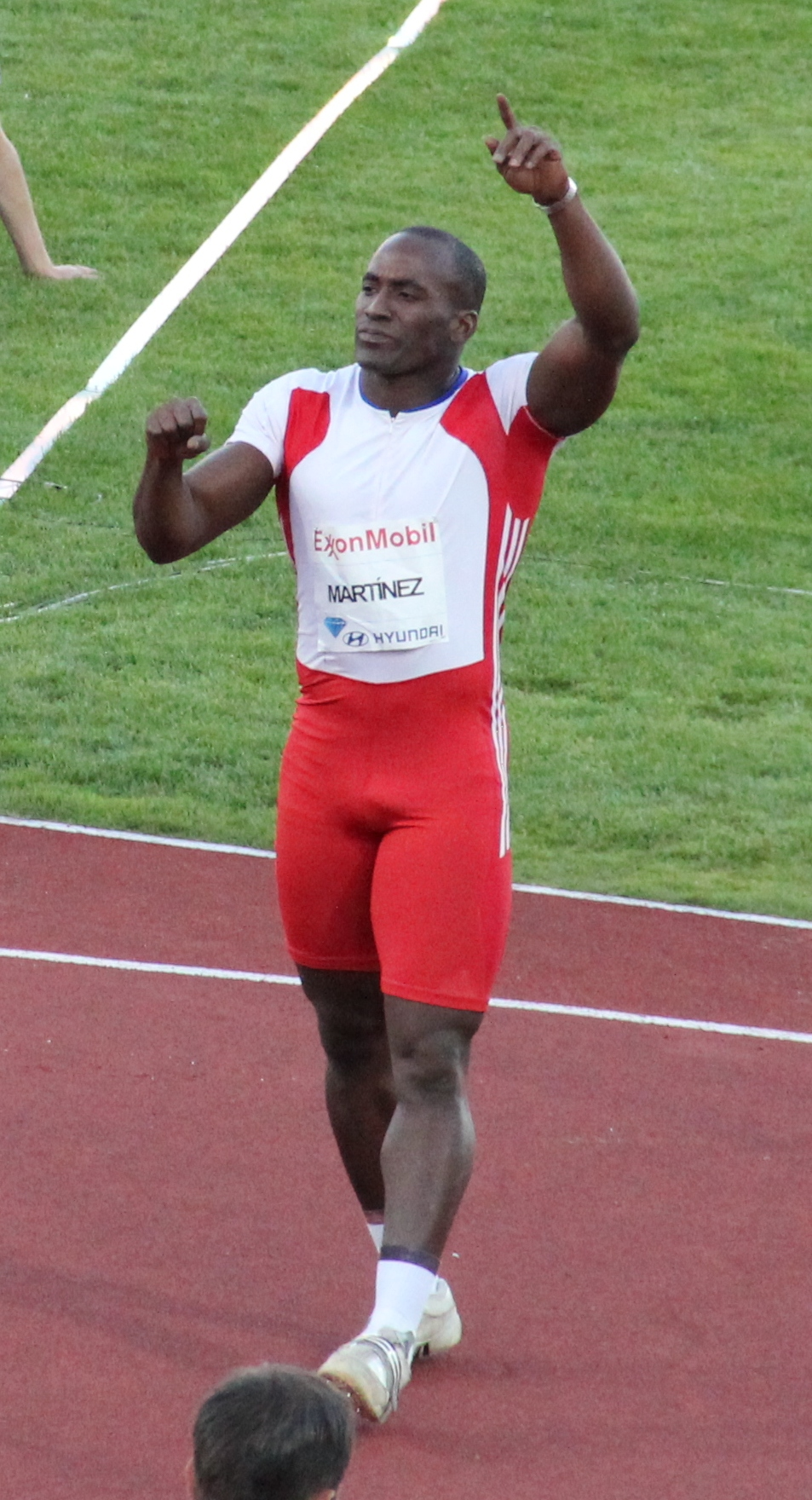
- Martínez at the 2010 Bislett Games

Personal information
- Full name: Guillermo Martínez López
- Born: June 28, 1981 (age 44) Camagüey
- Height: 1.80 m (5 ft 11 in)
- Weight: 106 kg (234 lb)

Sport
- Country: Cuba
- Sport: Athletics
- Event: Javelin
Medal record
World Championships
Silver medal – second place	2009 Berlin	Javelin
Bronze medal – third place	2011 Daegu	Javelin
Pan American Games
Gold medal – first place	2007 Rio de Janeiro	Javelin
Gold medal – first place	2011 Guadalajara	Javelin
- Updated on 27 December 2014

Guillermo Martínez López (born 28 June 1981 in Camagüey) is a Cuban javelin thrower.

In intercontinental competitions, he finished tenth at the 2005 World Championships and ninth at the 2007 World Championships. He also won the gold medal at the 2006 Central American and Caribbean Games and the gold medal at the 2007 Pan American Games

His personal best throw is 87.20 metres, achieved in October 2011 in Guadalajara.

== Personal best ==
- Javelin throw: 87.20 m – Guadalajara, Mexico, 28 October 2011

== Competition record ==
Year	Competition	Venue	Position	Notes
Representing Cuba
2005	World Championships	Helsinki, Finland	10th	72.68 m
2006	Central American and Caribbean Games	Cartagena, Colombia	1st	84.91 m
2007	ALBA Games	Caracas, Venezuela	1st	83.02 m
2007	Pan American Games	Rio de Janeiro, Brazil	1st	77.66 m
2007	World Championships	Osaka, Japan	9th	82.03 m
2009	ALBA Games	Havana, Cuba	1st	80.14 m
2009	Central American and Caribbean Championships	Havana, Cuba	1st	82.16 m
2009	World Championships	Berlin, Germany	2nd	86.41 m
2010	Ibero-American Championships	San Fernando, Spain	1st	81.71 m
2011	Central American and Caribbean Championships	Mayagüez, Puerto Rico	1st	81.55 m
2011	World Championships	Daegu, South Korea	3rd	84.30 m
2011	Pan American Games	Guadalajara, Mexico	1st	87.20 m
2012	Olympic Games	London, United Kingdom	16th (q)	80.06 m
2013	World Championships	Moscow, Russia	16th (q)	79.67 m
2014	Pan American Sports Festival	Mexico City, Mexico	4th	77.20 m A
2014	Central American and Caribbean Games	Xalapa, Mexico	1st	79.27 m A
2015	Pan American Games	Toronto, Canada	8th	74.79 m
2015	NACAC Championships	San José, Costa Rica	2nd	78.15 m

== Seasonal bests by year ==
- 2002 - 75.90
- 2003 - 75.35
- 2004 - 81.45
- 2005 - 84.06
- 2006 - 87.17
- 2007 - 85.93
- 2009 - 86.41
- 2010 - 86.38
- 2011 - 87.20
- 2012 - 82.72
- 2013 - 85.59
- 2014 - 79.27
- 2015 - 75.60
