= Ainārs Kovals =

Latvian javelin thrower (born 1981)

Personal information
- Born: 21 November 1981 (age 44) Rīga, Latvian SSR, USSR
- Height: 1.91 m (6 ft 3 in)
- Weight: 100 kg (220 lb)

Sport
- Country: Latvia
- Sport: Athletics
- Event: Javelin

Achievements and titles
- Personal best: 86.64 metres (2008)
Medal record
Olympic Games
Silver medal – second place	2008 Beijing	Javelin
Universiade
Gold medal – first place	2005 İzmir	Javelin
Gold medal – first place	2009 Belgrade	Javelin
Bronze medal – third place	2007 Bangkok	Javelin
- Updated on 11 August 2012

Ainārs Kovals (born 21 November 1981) is a former Latvian track and field athlete who competes in the javelin throw. His personal best throw is 86.64 m. He achieved this at the 2008 Summer Olympics, where he finished second.

He has been coached by Valentīna Eiduka. He is married to fellow javelin thrower Sinta Ozoliņa-Kovala.

== International competitions ==
Year	Competition	Venue	Position	Notes
Representing Latvia
2001	European U23 Championships	Amsterdam, Netherlands	4th	73.22 m
2003	European U23 Championships	Bydgoszcz, Poland	6th	72.68 m
2005	World Championships	Helsinki, Finland	7th	77.61 m
2005	Universiade	İzmir, Turkey	1st	80.67 m
2006	European Championships	Gothenburg, Sweden	5th	85.95 m (PB)
2006	World Athletics Final	Stuttgart, Germany	5th	82.32 m
2007	Universiade	Bangkok, Thailand	3rd	82.23 m
2008	Olympic Games	Beijing, China	2nd	86.64 m (PB)
2009	Universiade	Belgrade, Serbia	1st	81.58 m
2009	World Championships	Berlin, Germany	7th	81.54 m
2009	World Athletics Final	Thessaloniki, Greece	7th	80.07 m
2010	European Championships	Barcelona, Spain	6th	81.19 m
2012	European Championships	Helsinki, Finland	15th (q)	76.32 m
2012	Olympic Games	London, United Kingdom	17th (q)	79.19 m
2014	European Championships	Zürich, Switzerland	14th (q)	77.70 m

== Seasonal bests by year ==
- 2002 - 75.05
- 2003 - 80.75
- 2004 - 82.13
- 2005 - 82.22
- 2006 - 85.95
- 2007 - 82.23
- 2008 - 86.64
- 2009 - 82.47
- 2010 - 82.33
- 2011 - 78.39
- 2012 - 83.89
- 2013 - 80.71
- 2014 - 81.75
- 2015 - 78.90
