= Gabriel Wallin =

Swedish javelin thrower

Personal information
- Born: 14 October 1981 (age 44) Enhörna, Sweden
- Education: Boise State University
- Height: 1.93 m (6 ft 4 in)
- Weight: 95 kg (209 lb)

Sport
- Sport: Athletics
- Event: Javelin throw

Gabriel Wallin (born 14 October 1981) is a Swedish athlete specialising in the javelin throw. He represented his country at four World Championships in Athletics without qualifying for the final.

Wallin was an NCAA champion thrower for the Boise State Broncos track and field team, winning the javelin throw at the 2004 NCAA Division I Outdoor Track and Field Championships and 2005 NCAA Division I Outdoor Track and Field Championships.

His personal best in the event is 83.23 metres set in Hässelby in 2013.

== International competitions ==
Year	Competition	Venue	Position	Event	Notes
Representing Sweden
2003	European U23 Championships	Bydgoszcz, Poland	16th (q)	Javelin throw	68.30 m
2005	World Championships	Helsinki, Finland	24th (q)	Javelin throw	72.04 m m
2007	World Championships	Osaka, Japan	33rd (q)	Javelin throw	70.61 m
2010	European Championships	Barcelona, Spain	15th (q)	Javelin throw	76.12 m
2011	World Championships	Daegu, South Korea	26th (q)	Javelin throw	74.44 m
2012	European Championships	Helsinki, Finland	8th	Javelin throw	77.18 m
2013	World Championships	Moscow, Russia	28th (q)	Javelin throw	74.66 m
2014	European Championships	Zürich, Switzerland	26th (q)	Javelin throw	73.16 m
2016	European Championships	Amsterdam, Netherlands	23rd (q)	Javelin throw	76.00 m

== Seasonal bests by year ==
- 2004 - 80.71
- 2005 - 80.31
- 2007 - 78.97
- 2008 - 74.62
- 2009 - 79.69
- 2010 - 78.31
- 2011 - 80.88
- 2012 - 81.45
- 2013 - 83.23
- 2014 - 77.88
- 2015 - 79.16
- 2016 - 82.81
