= Esko Mikkola =

Finnish javelin thrower

Personal information
- Born: 14 February 1975 (age 51) Tampere, Finland

Sport
- Sport: Track and field
Medal record
Representing Finland
Summer Universiade
Silver medal – second place	2003 Daegu	Javelin throw

Esko Olavi Mikkola (born 14 February 1975) is a Finnish javelin thrower.

Competing for the Arizona Wildcats track and field team, Mikkola won two NCAA DI javelin titles.

He won a silver medal at the 2003 Summer Universiade in Daegu and finished eleventh at the 2004 Olympic Games in Athens. He then competed at the 2005 World Championships without reaching the final.

His personal best throw is 84.27 metres, achieved in July 2004 in Nokia.

Esko was a research assistant at The University of Arizona, Electrical and Computer Engineering Department and has published numerous papers in the fields of prognostic cells and radiation effects. As of spring 2008, Mikkola has completed his Ph.D. and has returned to Finland for the summer to concentrate on training for the 2008 Olympics.

Currently, he works as the CEO for the company Alphacore that he founded, located in Phoenix, Arizona. He has received U.S. citizenship.

== Achievements ==
Year	Competition	Venue	Position	Notes
Representing Finland
1999	Universiade	Palma de Mallorca, Spain	8th	75.30 m
2003	Universiade	Daegu, South Korea	2nd	75.82 m
2004	Olympic Games	Athens, Greece	11th	79.43 m
2005	World Championships	Helsinki, Finland	21st (q)	72.54 m

== Seasonal bests by year ==
- 1992 - 61.36
- 1993 - 65.72
- 1994 - 73.32
- 1996 - 73.32
- 1997 - 73.34
- 1998 - 81.86
- 1999 - 81.61
- 2000 - 74.06
- 2001 - 82.48
- 2002 - 76.60
- 2003 - 82.02
- 2004 - 84.27
- 2005 - 82.14
- 2006 - 80.05
- 2007 - 82.34
- 2008 - 82.83
- 2009 - 80.08
- 2010 - 74.80
