= Stefan Müller (athlete) =

Swiss javelin thrower

Stefan Müller (born September 20, 1979) is a Swiss javelin thrower. Müller is the Swiss national record holder with 82.07 metres, achieved in September 2006 in Bern.

He finished seventh in the javelin final at the 2006 European Athletics Championships in Gothenburg, throwing a personal best. He won a bronze medal at the 2005 Summer Universiade.

== Competition record ==
Year	Competition	Venue	Position	Notes
Representing Switzerland
2001	European U23 Championships	Amsterdam, Netherlands	11th	68.95 m
2003	Universiade	Daegu, South Korea	7th	73.78 m
2005	World Championships	Helsinki, Finland	15th (q)	76.30 m
2005	Universiade	İzmir, Turkey	3rd	79.61 m
2006	European Championships	Gothenburg, Sweden	7th	80.87 m
2007	World Championships	Osaka, Japan	31st (q)	71.48 m
2009	World Championships	Berlin, Germany	35th (q)	72.83 m

== Seasonal bests by year ==
- 2002 - 75.73
- 2003 - 77.95
- 2004 - 76.65
- 2005 - 78.98
- 2006 - 82.07
- 2007 - 79.43
- 2008 - 77.32
- 2009 - 81.07
- 2011 - 76.94
