= Igor Janik =

Polish javelin thrower

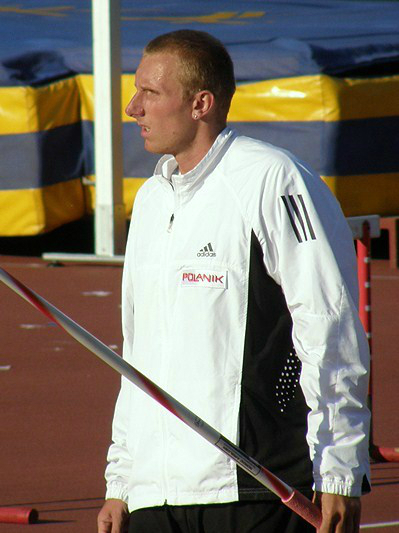
- Igor Janik in 2010

Personal information
- Nationality: Poland
- Born: 18 January 1983 (age 43) Gdynia, Poland
- Height: 2.00 m (6 ft 6 1/2 in)
- Weight: 108 kg (238 lb) (2012)

Sport
- Sport: Athletics
- Event: Javelin throw
- Club: AZS AWFiS Gdańsk
Medal record
Men's athletics
Representing Poland
European Team Championships
Bronze medal – third place	2009 Leiria	Javelin throw
Universiade
Gold medal – first place	2003 Daegu	Javelin throw
Silver medal – second place	2007 Bangkok	Javelin throw
Bronze medal – third place	2011 Shenzhen	Javelin throw
European Cup Winter Throwing
Gold medal – first place	2006 Tel Aviv	Javelin throw
World Junior Championships
Gold medal – first place	2002 Kingston	Javelin throw
European U23 Championships
Gold medal – first place	2005 Erfurt	Javelin throw
Silver medal – second place	2003 Bydgoszcz	Javelin throw

Igor Janik (born 18 January 1983 in Gdynia) is a former male javelin thrower from Poland. His personal best throw is 84.76m achieved in 2008. He retired in 2013.

== Competition record ==
Year	Competition	Venue	Position	Notes
Representing Poland
2001	European Junior Championships	Grosseto, Italy	6th	72.05 m
2002	World Junior Championships	Kingston, Jamaica	1st	74.16 m
2003	European U23 Championships	Bydgoszcz, Poland	2nd	82.54 m
2003	Universiade	Daegu, South Korea	1st	76.83 m
2005	European U23 Championships	Erfurt, Germany	1st	77.25 m
2005	Universiade	İzmir, Turkey	5th	75.98 m
2007	World Championships	Osaka, Japan	7th	83.38 m
2007	Universiade	Bangkok, Thailand	2nd	82.28 m
2008	Olympic Games	Beijing, China	16th (q)	77.63 m
2009	Universiade	Belgrade, Serbia	4th	79.16 m
2009	World Championships	Berlin, Germany	31st (q)	75.20 m
2011	Universiade	Shenzhen, China	3rd	79.65 m
2011	World Championships	Daegu, South Korea	13th (q)	80.88 m
2012	European Championships	Helsinki, Finland	6th	81.21 m
2012	Olympic Games	London, United Kingdom	19th (q)	78.90 m

== Seasonal bests by year ==
- 2000 - 62.41
- 2001 - 75.03
- 2002 - 78.90
- 2003 - 82.54
- 2004 - 69.39
- 2005 - 77.25
- 2006 - 82.86
- 2007 - 83.38
- 2008 - 84.76
- 2009 - 83.52
- 2010 - 80.83
- 2011 - 82.81
- 2012 - 82.37
- 2013 - 80.13
