= Stephan Steding =

German javelin thrower

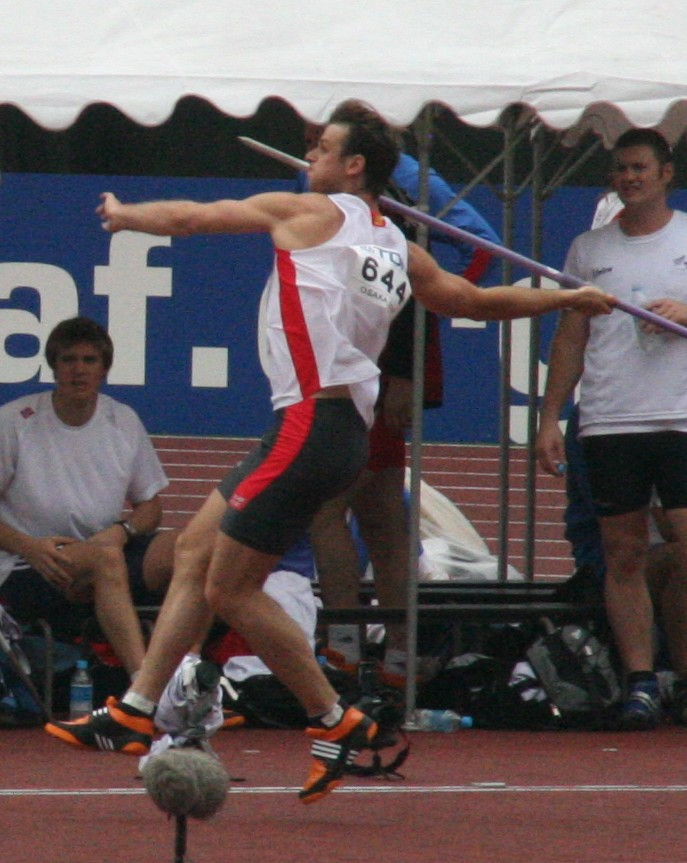

Personal information
- Nationality: German
- Born: January 29, 1982 (age 44)
- Height: 2.01 m (6 ft 7 in)
- Weight: 106 kg (234 lb)

Sport
- Country: Germany
- Sport: Track and field
- Event: Javelin throw
- Club: Hannover 96
- Coached by: Marek Schulz

Achievements and titles
- Personal best: Javelin throw: 83.50 m

Stephan Steding (born 29 January 1982) is a German track and field athlete competing in the javelin throw. He competed in the 2008 Summer Olympics in Beijing, where he missed the final round after finishing 17th in his qualification group with 70.05 m. Steding has a personal best of 83.50 m.

== Competition record ==
Year	Competition	Venue	Position	Notes
Representing Germany
2003	European U23 Championships	Bydgoszcz, Poland	5th	76.72 m
2003	Universiade	Daegu, South Korea	10th	65.91 m
2007	World Championships	Osaka, Japan	27th (q)	74.61 m
2008	European Cup Winter Throwing	Split, Croatia	2nd	79.55 m
2008	Olympic Games	Beijing, China	32nd (q)	70.05 m

== Seasonal bests by year ==
- 2002 - 78.50
- 2003 - 81.96
- 2004 - 82.13
- 2006 - 74.64
- 2007 - 82.46
- 2008 - 83.50
- 2009 - 81.28
