= Tero Järvenpää =

Finnish javelin thrower

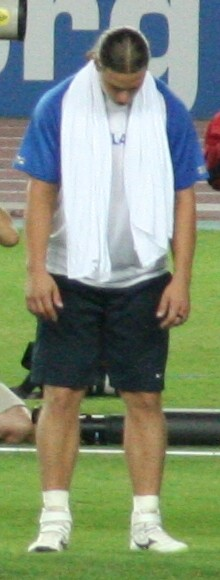
Tero Järvenpää in 2007

Tero Mikael Järvenpää (born 2 October 1984 in Tampere) is a Finnish former javelin thrower. He represents Tampereen Pyrintö on club-level and his coach is his father Pentti Järvenpää. He retired in 2015.

His personal best throw is 86.68 metres, achieved in July 2008 in Tampere.

== Seasonal bests by year ==
- 2003 - 80.45
- 2004 - 80.13
- 2005 - 84.05
- 2006 - 84.95
- 2007 - 84.35
- 2008 - 86.68
- 2009 - 82.65
- 2010 - 83.81
- 2011 - 80.10

== Achievements ==
Year	Competition	Venue	Position	Event	Notes
Representing Finland
2001	World Youth Championships	Debrecen, Hungary	3rd	Javelin (700g)	68.82 m
2003	European Junior Championships	Tampere, Finland	2nd	Javelin	73.66 m
2005	European U23 Championships	Erfurt, Germany	5th	Javelin	75.25 m
2005	Universiade	İzmir, Turkey	2nd	Javelin	79.61 m
2006	European Championships	Gothenburg, Sweden	17th (q)	Javelin	75.21 m
2007	World Championships	Osaka, Japan	8th	Javelin	82.10 m
2008	Olympic Games	Beijing, China	4th	Javelin	83.95 m
2009	World Championships	Berlin, Germany	11th	Javelin	75.57 m
