= Athletics at the 2004 Summer Olympics – Men's javelin throw =

Men's javelin throw at the Games of the XXVIII Olympiad
- Olympic Athletics
- Venue: Olympic Stadium
- Dates: 26–28 August
- Competitors: 34 from 23 nations
- Winning distance: 86.50

Medalists
| 1st place, gold medalist(s) | | Andreas Thorkildsen; Norway |
| 2nd place, silver medalist(s) | | Vadims Vasiļevskis; Latvia |
| 3rd place, bronze medalist(s) | | Sergey Makarov; Russia |

The men's javelin throw competition at the 2004 Summer Olympics in Athens was held at the Olympic Stadium on 26–28 August.

== Competition format ==
In the qualifying round, each athlete receives three throws. All who achieve the qualifying distance progress to the final. If less than twelve athletes achieve this mark, then the twelve furthest throwing athletes reach the final. Each finalist is allowed three throws in last round, with the top eight athletes after that point being given three further attempts.

== Schedule ==
All times are Greece Standard Time (UTC+2)

| Date | Time | Round |
|---|---|---|
| Thursday, 26 August 2004 | 20:00 | Qualification |
| Saturday, 28 August 2004 | 20:40 | Final |

== Records ==
Prior to the competition, the existing world record, Olympic record, and world leading mark were as follows:

| World record | Jan Železný (CZE) | 98.48 m | Jena, Germany | 25 May 1996 |
| Olympic record | Jan Železný (CZE) | 90.17 m | Sydney, Australia | 23 September 2000 |
| World Leading | Aleksandr Ivanov (RUS) | 87.73 m | Ostrava, Czech Republic | 8 June 2004 |

No new records were set during the competition.

== Results ==
=== Qualifying round ===
Rule: Qualifying standard 81.00 (Q) or at least best 12 qualified (q).

| Rank | Group | Name | Nationality | #1 | #2 | #3 | Result | Notes |
|---|---|---|---|---|---|---|---|---|
| 1 | A | Breaux Greer | United States | 87.25 | — | — | 87.25 | Q |
| 2 | A | Sergey Makarov | Russia | 86.08 | — | — | 86.08 | Q |
| 3 | B | Vadims Vasiļevskis | Latvia | 84.43 | — | — | 84.43 | Q, PB |
| 4 | A | Esko Mikkola | Finland | 83.64 | — | — | 83.64 | Q |
| 5 | A | Andrus Värnik | Estonia | 83.25 | — | — | 83.25 | Q |
| 6 | B | Aleksandr Ivanov | Russia | 82.18 | — | — | 82.18 | Q |
| 7 | B | Tero Pitkämäki | Finland | 82.04 | — | — | 82.04 | Q |
| 8 | B | Andreas Thorkildsen | Norway | 81.74 | — | — | 81.74 | Q |
| 9 | B | Jan Železný | Czech Republic | 81.18 | — | — | 81.18 | Q |
| 10 | A | Matti Närhi | Finland | 81.06 | — | — | 81.06 | Q |
| 11 | B | Ēriks Rags | Latvia | 77.92 | 80.84 | x | 80.84 | q |
| 12 | A | Steve Backley | Great Britain | 80.60 | 80.68 | 80.39 | 80.68 | q |
| 13 | B | Isbel Luaces | Cuba | 80.07 | 77.53 | 79.07 | 80.07 | |
| 14 | A | Gerhardus Pienaar | South Africa | 79.95 | 74.69 | 79.56 | 79.95 | |
| 15 | B | Li Rongxiang | China | 79.73 | x | 79.94 | 79.94 | |
| 16 | A | Christian Nicolay | Germany | 79.77 | x | 78.50 | 79.77 | |
| 17 | A | Voldemārs Lūsis | Latvia | 79.27 | x | x | 79.27 | |
| 18 | B | Yukifumi Murakami | Japan | 77.25 | 77.60 | 78.59 | 78.59 | |
| 19 | B | Oliver Dziubak | Australia | 77.21 | 78.53 | 75.57 | 78.53 | |
| 20 | B | Peter Esenwein | Germany | 75.18 | 73.76 | 78.41 | 78.41 | |
| 21 | A | William Hamlyn-Harris | Australia | 69.64 | 74.34 | 77.43 | 77.43 | |
| 22 | A | Peter Zupanc | Slovenia | 74.11 | 72.42 | 77.34 | 77.34 | |
| 23 | A | Miroslav Guzdek | Czech Republic | 76.45 | 75.36 | 75.75 | 76.45 | |
| 24 | B | Sergey Voynov | Uzbekistan | 74.68 | 74.08 | 72.71 | 74.68 | |
| 25 | B | Stuart Farquhar | New Zealand | 74.24 | 73.07 | 74.63 | 74.63 | |
| 26 | A | Gergely Horváth | Hungary | 73.45 | 73.95 | 72.05 | 73.95 | |
| 27 | A | Ronny Nilsen | Norway | x | 73.46 | x | 73.46 | |
| 28 | B | Nick Nieland | Great Britain | 68.86 | 71.31 | 72.79 | 72.79 | |
| 29 | B | Park Jae-myong | South Korea | 63.01 | 67.60 | 72.70 | 72.70 | |
| 30 | A | Manuel Fuenmayor | Venezuela | 72.26 | 68.72 | 72.14 | 72.26 | |
| 31 | A | David Brisseault | France | 68.70 | 71.86 | 69.58 | 71.86 | |
| 32 | A | Marián Bokor | Slovakia | 68.21 | 71.74 | 67.73 | 71.74 | |
| 33 | B | Edi Ponoš | Croatia | 66.73 | x | 71.43 | 71.43 | |
| | B | Boris Henry | Germany | | | | DNS | |

=== Final ===
| Rank | Name | Nationality | 1 | 2 | 3 | 4 | 5 | 6 | Result | Notes |
|---|---|---|---|---|---|---|---|---|---|---|
| 1st place, gold medalist(s) | Andreas Thorkildsen | Norway | 84.82 | 86.50 | 80.96 | x | — | — | 86.50 | PB |
| 2nd place, silver medalist(s) | Vadims Vasiļevskis | Latvia | 84.95 | 83.95 | x | x | 79.07 | 80.91 | 84.95 | PB |
| 3rd place, bronze medalist(s) | Sergey Makarov | Russia | 84.84 | x | 77.59 | 78.00 | 82.51 | 84.32 | 84.84 | |
| 4 | Steve Backley | Great Britain | 79.62 | 81.48 | 84.13 | 83.02 | x | 81.62 | 84.13 | SB |
| 5 | Aleksandr Ivanov | Russia | 83.31 | 82.76 | 81.36 | 80.28 | 78.07 | 79.99 | 83.31 | |
| 6 | Andrus Värnik | Estonia | 83.25 | 82.72 | x | x | 76.41 | — | 83.25 | |
| 7 | Ēriks Rags | Latvia | 77.13 | 83.14 | 81.69 | x | x | 78.63 | 83.14 | |
| 8 | Tero Pitkämäki | Finland | 80.38 | 83.01 | x | x | 81.19 | x | 83.01 | |
| 9 | Jan Železný | Czech Republic | 76.77 | 79.98 | 80.59 | | | | 80.59 | |
| 10 | Matti Närhi | Finland | x | 80.28 | 78.73 | | | | 80.28 | |
| 11 | Esko Mikkola | Finland | 76.20 | 79.43 | 76.23 | | | | 79.43 | |
| 12 | Breaux Greer | United States | 74.36 | x | x | | | | 74.36 | |
