= Pål Arne Fagernes =

Norwegian javelin thrower

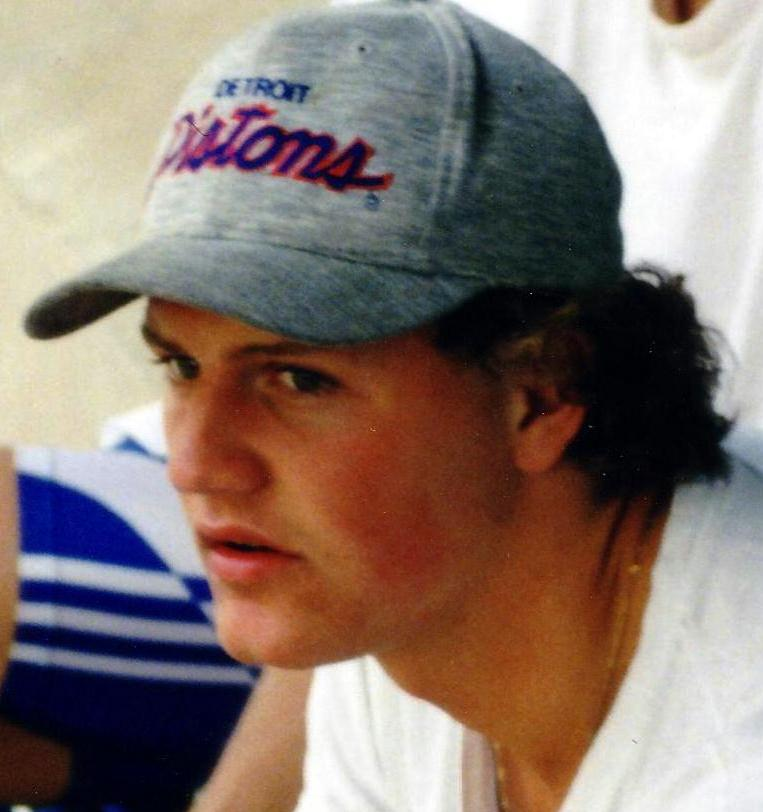

Personal information
- Nationality: Norwegian
- Born: 8 June 1974 Asker, Norway
- Died: 4 August 2003 (aged 29) Moss, Norway

Sport
- Country: Norway
- Sport: Track and field, Boxing
- Event: Javelin throw
- Club: Asker SK, IK Tjalve

Achievements and titles
- Personal best: Javelin throw: 86.74 m

Pål Arne Fagernes (8 June 1974 – 4 August 2003) was a Norwegian javelin thrower. He represented Asker SK and IK Tjalve during his active career.

As a junior, Fagernes competed on top national level in cycling, athletics, and cross country skiing, before deciding to focus on javelin.

He made his international athletics debut at the 1994 European Cup, and competed at the 1996 Summer Olympics, 1997 World Championships and 1998 European Championships without reaching the final rounds. Competing for the Arizona State Sun Devils track and field team, he won the 1996 NCAA Division I Outdoor Track and Field Championships.

His international breakthrough came at the 1999 World Championships in Seville, where he finished fourth with a Norwegian record throw of 86.24 metres. At the 2000 Summer Olympics in Sydney he established a Norwegian record of 86.74 metres in the qualifying round. In the final he threw 83.04 metres to finish ninth. His 86.74 m throw remained his career best.

His first medal at the Norwegian championships was a silver medal in 1994. He became Norwegian champion in 1996, 1998, 1999 and 2002. In 2002 Fagernes decided to take up boxing. He boxed one professional boxing match in the heavyweight class in 2003, which he beat his opponent Peter Simko on technical knockout after 25 seconds.

Over the years Fagernes' sporting career became tainted by personal problems. In 2000 he was sentenced to 18 days in prison for letting an intoxicated person drive his car. In 2001, shortly after withdrawing from the 2001 World Championships for disciplinary reasons, he was caught using cocaine in a police razzia. He was, however, cleared of doping charges. In April 2003 he was charged with property damage after walking on a car roof in Oslo.

Fagernes died in a car accident on the European route E6 north of Moss in August 2003, when his car collided with a lorry. His Norwegian record would remain until June 2005, when it was improved to 86.82 metres by reigning Olympic champion Andreas Thorkildsen. Thorkildsen would later improve the record further.

== Seasonal bests by year ==
- 1994 - 74.10
- 1995 - 77.46
- 1996 - 85.06
- 1997 - 82.80
- 1998 - 84.46
- 1999 - 86.24
- 2000 - 86.74
- 2001 - 84.30
- 2002 - 81.25
- 2003 - 74.82

== Achievements ==
Year	Competition	Venue	Position	Notes
1996	Olympic Games	Atlanta, Georgia, United States	13th	79.78 m
1997	World Championships	Athens, Greece	20th	75.66 m
1998	European Championships	Budapest, Hungary	16th	77.54 m
1999	World Championships	Seville, Spain	4th	86.24 m
2000	Olympic Games	Sydney, Australia	9th	83.04 m
