= Teemu Wirkkala =

Finnish javelin thrower

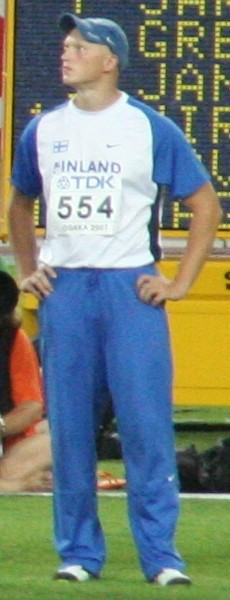
Teemu Wirkkala in Osaka 2007.

Teemu Sakari Wirkkala (born 14 January 1984 in Kokkola) is a Finnish javelin thrower. His personal best throw is 87.23 metres, achieved in July 2009 in Joensuu.

== Achievements ==
Year	Competition	Venue	Position	Event	Notes
Representing Finland
2001	World Youth Championships	Debrecen, Hungary	7th	Javelin (700 g)	70.98 m
2002	World Junior Championships	Kingston, Jamaica	7th	Javelin	70.98 m
2003	European Junior Championships	Tampere, Finland	1st	Javelin	79.90 m
2005	European U23 Championships	Erfurt, Germany	6th	Javelin	74.97 m
2006	European Championships	Gothenburg, Sweden	13th (q)	Javelin	79.05 m
2007	World Championships	Osaka, Japan	12th	Javelin	78.01 m
2007	World Athletics Final	Stuttgart, Germany	4th	Javelin	80.20 m
2008	Olympic Games	Beijing, PR China	5th	Javelin	83.46 m
2009	Finnish Championships	Espoo, Finland	1st	Javelin	85.84 m
2009	World Championships	Berlin, Germany	9th	Javelin	79.82 m
2009	World Athletics Final	Thessaloniki, Greece	6th	Javelin	80.50 m
2010	European Championships	Barcelona, Spain	5th	Javelin	81.76 m
2012	European Championships	Helsinki, Finland	–	Javelin	NM
2013	World Championships	Moscow, Russia	17th (q)	Javelin	79.50 m

== Seasonal bests by year ==
- 2000 – 68.21
- 2001 – 69.22
- 2002 – 74.56
- 2003 – 80.57
- 2004 – 80.97
- 2005 – 80.68
- 2006 – 82.82
- 2007 – 84.06
- 2008 – 84.10
- 2009 – 87.23
- 2010 – 86.53
- 2011 – 82.39
- 2012 – 83.73
- 2013 – 82.91
- 2014 – 77.45
- 2015 – 84.39
