= Tomas Intas =

Lithuanian javelin thrower (born 1981)

Tomas Intas (born 15 September 1981, in Klaipėda) is a Lithuanian javelin thrower. His personal best throw is 82.94 metres, achieved in September 2004 in Banská Bystrica.

== Achievements ==
Year	Competition	Venue	Position	Notes
Representing Lithuania
1999	European Junior Championships	Riga, Latvia	1st	77.88 m
2000	World Junior Championships	Santiago, Chile	10th	65.63 m
2001	European U23 Championships	Amsterdam, Netherlands	8th	71.29 m
2003	European U23 Championships	Bydgoszcz, Poland	12th	63.94 m
2005	World Championships	Helsinki, Finland	11th	70.11 m
2005	Universiade	İzmir, Turkey	10th	72.58 m
2006	European Championships	Gothenburg, Sweden	18th (q)	74.76 m
2007	Universiade	Bangkok, Thailand	13th (q)	67.60 m

== Seasonal bests by year ==
- 1999 - 77.88
- 2001 - 78.12
- 2002 - 78.63
- 2004 - 82.94
- 2005 - 82.04
- 2006 - 77.15
- 2007 - 77.68
- 2009 - 78.08
