= Joachim Kiteau =

French javelin thrower

Personal information
- Born: 23 June 1982 (age 44)

Sport
- Country: France
- Sport: Athletics
- Event: Javelin throw

Achievements and titles
- Personal best: Javelin throw: 79.05 m (2002)

Joachim Kiteau (born 23 June 1982) is a French male javelin thrower, who won an individual gold medal at the Youth World Championships.
