= Song Dong-hyeon =

South Korean javelin thrower

Personal information
- Nationality: South Korean
- Born: 17 November 1981 (age 44)

Sport
- Sport: Athletics
- Event: Javelin throw

Song Dong-hyeon (born 17 November 1981) is a South Korean athlete. He competed in the men's javelin throw at the 2000 Summer Olympics.
