= Peter Zupanc =

Slovenian javelin thrower

Personal information
- Full name: Peter Zupanc
- Nationality: Slovenia
- Born: 8 January 1982 (age 44) Ljubljana, SR Slovenia, SFR Yugoslavia
- Height: 1.84 m (6 ft 1/2 in)
- Weight: 90 kg (198 lb)

Sport
- Sport: Athletics
- Event: Javelin throw
- Club: AD Kronos

Achievements and titles
- Personal best: Javelin throw: 78.60 (2004)

Peter Zupanc (born January 8, 1982, in Ljubljana) is a retired Slovenian javelin thrower. He represented Slovenia at the 2004 Summer Olympics, and also recorded his own personal best of 78.60 metres from the Slovenian Championships in his native Ljubljana. Throughout his sporting career, Zupanc trained for Kronos Athletics Association (Slovene: Atletsko Društvo Kronos).

Zupanc qualified for the Slovenian squad in the men's javelin throw at the 2004 Summer Olympics in Athens, by registering a B-standard entry mark of 78.60 metres from the Slovenian Championships. Zupanc released a javelin with a satisfying 77.34-metre throw on his third attempt in the qualifying round, nearly an inch shorter of his personal best. Placing twenty-second out of thirty-four athletes in the overall standings, Zupanc failed to advance further to the final.
