= 2006 IAAF World Athletics Final =

International track and field competition

The 4th IAAF World Athletics Final was held at the Gottlieb-Daimler-Stadion in Stuttgart, Germany on September 9 and September 10, 2006.

== Results ==
=== Men ===
Event	Gold		Silver		Bronze	
100 m	Asafa Powell; Jamaica	9.89 CR	Leonard Scott; United States	9.91	Tyson Gay; United States	9.92
200 m	Tyson Gay; United States	19.68 CR	Wallace Spearmon; United States	19.88	Usain Bolt; Jamaica	20.10
400 m	Jeremy Wariner; United States	44.02 CR	Gary Kikaya; DR Congo	44.10 AR	LaShawn Merritt; United States	44.14
800 m	Mbulaeni Mulaudzi; South Africa	1:46.99	Bram Som; Netherlands	1:47.10	Wilfred Bungei; Kenya	1:47.22
1500 m	Alex Kipchirchir; Kenya	3:32.76 CR	Bernard Lagat; United States	3:32.93	Augustine Choge; Kenya	3:33.37
3000 m	Tariku Bekele; Ethiopia	7:38.98	Edwin Soi; Kenya	7:39.25	Isaac Kiprono Songok; Kenya	7:39.50
5000 m	Kenenisa Bekele; Ethiopia	13:48.62	Edwin Soi; Kenya	13:49.45	Abreham Cherkos; Ethiopia	13:49.66
110 m hurdles	Liu Xiang; China	12.93 CR	Dayron Robles; Cuba	13.00 NR	Allen Johnson; United States	13.01
400 m hurdles	Periklis Iakovakis; Greece	47.92	L.J. van Zyl; South Africa	48.08	Bershawn Jackson; United States	48.24
3000 m s'chase	Paul Kipsiele Koech; Kenya	8:01.37	Richard Mateelong; Kenya	8:08.62	Bouabdellah Tahri; France	8:10.86
High jump	Linus Thörnblad; Sweden	2.33 m	Andrey Silnov; Russia	2.33 m	Stefan Holm; Sweden Yaroslav Rybakov; Russia	2.29 m
Pole vault	Paul Burgess; Australia	5.82 m	Toby Stevenson; United States	5.82 m	Tim Lobinger; Germany	5.82 m
Long jump	Irving Saladino; Panama	8.41 m	Mohamed Salman Al-Khuwalidi; Saudi Arabia	8.34 m	Louis Tsatoumas; Greece	8.29 m
Triple jump	Yoandri Betanzos; Cuba	17.29 m	Jadel Gregório; Brazil	17.12 m	Walter Davis; United States	16.98 m
Shot put	Reese Hoffa; United States	21.05 m	Christian Cantwell; United States	20.94 m	Rutger Smith; Netherlands	20.74 m
Discus	Virgilijus Alekna; Lithuania	68.63 m CR	Gerd Kanter; Estonia	68.47 m	Aleksander Tammert; Estonia	64.94 m
Hammer	Koji Murofushi; Japan	81.42 m	Ivan Tikhon; Belarus	81.12 m	Krisztián Pars; Hungary	80.41 m
Javelin	Andreas Thorkildsen; Norway	89.50 m	Tero Pitkämäki; Finland	88.25 m	Peter Esenwein; Germany	85.30 m

=== Women ===
Event	Gold		Silver		Bronze	
100 m	Sherone Simpson; Jamaica	10.89	Torri Edwards; United States	11.06 SB	Allyson Felix; United States	11.07
200 m	Allyson Felix; United States	22.11 CR	Sanya Richards; United States	22.17 PB	Sherone Simpson; Jamaica	22.22
400 m	Sanya Richards; United States	49.25 CR	Novlene Williams; Jamaica	50.36	Shericka Williams; Jamaica	50.44
800 m	Zulia Calatayud; Cuba	1:59.02 CR	Janeth Jepkosgei; Kenya	1:59.10	Hasna Benhassi; Morocco	1:59.44
1500 m	Maryam Yusuf Jamal; Bahrain	4:01.58	Tatyana Tomashova; Russia	4:03.26	Yelena Soboleva; Russia	4:03.49
3000 m	Meseret Defar; Ethiopia	8:34.22 CR	Tirunesh Dibaba; Ethiopia	8:34.74	Vivian Cheruiyot; Kenya	8:38.86 PB
5000 m	Tirunesh Dibaba; Ethiopia	16:04.77	Meseret Defar; Ethiopia	16:04.78	Isabella Ochichi; Kenya	16:07.39
100 m hurdles	Michelle Perry; United States	12.52	Damu Cherry; United States	12.56	Perdita Felicien; Canada	12.58 SB
400 m hurdles	Lashinda Demus; United States	53.42	Tiffany Williams; United States	54.22	Tetiana Tereschuk-Antipova; Ukraine	54.76
3000 m s'chase	Alesia Turava; Belarus	9:27.08	Jeruto Kiptum; Kenya	9:28.60	Salome Chepchumba; Kenya	9:29.58
High jump	Kajsa Bergqvist; Sweden	1.98 m	Tia Hellebaut; Belgium	1.98 m	Venelina Veneva; Bulgaria	1.98 m
Pole vault	Yelena Isinbayeva; Russia	4.75 m	Monika Pyrek; Poland	4.65 m	Jennifer Stuczynski; United States	4.60 m
Long jump	Tatyana Lebedeva; Russia	6.92 m	Bronwyn Thompson; Australia	6.77 m	Rose Richmond; United States	6.75 m
Triple jump	Tatyana Lebedeva; Russia	14.82 m	Hrysopiyi Devetzi; Greece	14.67 m	Yamilé Aldama; Sudan	14.67 m
Shot put	Natallia Kharaneka; Belarus	19.81 m	Valerie Vili; New Zealand	19.64 m	Yumileidi Cumbá; Cuba	18.78 m
Discus throw	Franka Dietzsch; Germany	64.73 m	Nicoleta Grasu; Romania	62.32 m	Anna Söderberg; Sweden	61.50 m
Hammer throw	Betty Heidler; Germany	75.44 m CR	Kamila Skolimowska; Poland	73.33 m	Yipsi Moreno; Cuba	71.85 m
Javelin throw	Barbora Špotáková; Czech Republic	66.21 m NR	Steffi Nerius; Germany	65.06 m	Christina Scherwin; Denmark	64.83 m NR
WR world record | AR area record | CR championship record | GR games record | NR national record | OR Olympic record | PB personal best | SB season best | WL world leading (in a given season)
