= Aleksandr Ivanov (javelin thrower) =

Russian javelin thrower

Alexandr Valerevich Ivanov (Russian: Александр Валерьевич Иванов; born May 25, 1982, in Saint Petersburg) is a Russian javelin thrower. His personal best throw is 88.90 metres, achieved in June 2003 in Tula.

== Achievements ==
Year	Competition	Venue	Position	Notes
Representing Russia
1999	World Youth Championships	Bydgoszcz, Poland	3rd	78.65 m (700g)
2000	World Junior Championships	Santiago, Chile	6th	71.02 m
2001	World Championships	Edmonton, Canada	10th	80.56 m
2001	European Junior Championships	Grosseto, Italy	1st	80.18 m
2002	European Championships	Munich, Germany	6th	82.66 m
2003	European U23 Championships	Bydgoszcz, Poland	1st	82.59 m
2003	World Championships	Paris, France	12th	77.32 m
2003	World Athletics Final	Monte Carlo, Monaco	4th	80.58 m
2004	Olympic Games	Athens, Greece	5th	83.31 m
2004	World Athletics Final	Monte Carlo, Monaco	6th	77.25 m
2005	World Championships	Helsinki, Finland	5th	79.14 m
2005	World Athletics Final	Monte Carlo, Monaco	7th	78.32 m
2006	European Championships	Gothenburg, Sweden	8th	80.09 m
2006	World Cup	Athens, Greece	3rd	81.87 m
2007	World Championships	Osaka, Japan	5th	85.18m
2008	Olympic Games	Beijing, China	14th	79.27 m

== Seasonal bests by year ==
- 2000 – 77.11
- 2001 – 83.55
- 2002 – 87.62
- 2003 – 88.90
- 2004 – 87.73
- 2005 – 84.24
- 2006 – 84.22
- 2007 – 86.71
- 2008 – 83.21
- 2009 – 82.40
- 2010 – 77.11
- 2011 – 82.17
- 2013 – 70.50
- 2014 – 74.75
