= Francesco Pignata =

Italian javelin thrower

Personal information
- Nationality: Italian
- Born: February 14, 1978 (age 48) Reggio Calabria, Italy

Sport
- Country: Italy
- Sport: Athletics
- Event: Javelin throw
- Club: G.S. Fiamme Gialle
- Retired: 2010

Achievements and titles
- Personal best: Javelin throw: 81.67 m (2005)
Medal record
Event	1st	2nd	3rd
Mediterranean Games	0	1	0
European Cup	0	0	2

Francesco Pignata (born 14 February 1978) is a former Italian javelin thrower.

== Biography ==
His personal best 81.67, set in 2005, is the second best measure of all-time in Italy, after the national record of Carlo Sonego (84.60 m set in 1999).

From 2 December 2012 Francesco Pignata is Federal Councillor of the Federazione Italiana di Atletica Leggera (FIDAL), in the Alfio Giomi leaderships.

== Achievements ==
Year	Competition	Venue	Position	Event	Notes
Representing Italy
1996	World Junior Championships	Sydney, Australia	19th (q)	Javelin	61.74 m
1999	European U23 Championships	Gothenburg, Sweden	13th	Javelin	65.86 m
2005	Mediterranean Games	Almeria, Spain	2nd	Javelin throw	74.51 m
2005	World Championships	Helsinki, Finland	23rd	Javelin throw	72.17 m

== National titles ==
He has won 7 times the individual national championship.

- 4 wins in Javelin throw (2003, 2004, 2005, 2006)
- 3 wins in Javelin throw (2006, 2007, 2008) at the Italian Winter Throwing Championships

== Progression ==
- 1996 - 68.34
- 1997 - 68.12
- 2002 - 78.69
- 2003 - 78.40
- 2004 - 79.34
- 2005 - 81.67
- 2006 - 79.70
- 2007 - 77.94
- 2008 - 74.76

== See also ==
- Italian all-time lists - Javelin throw
