= Vadims Vasiļevskis =

Latvian javelin thrower

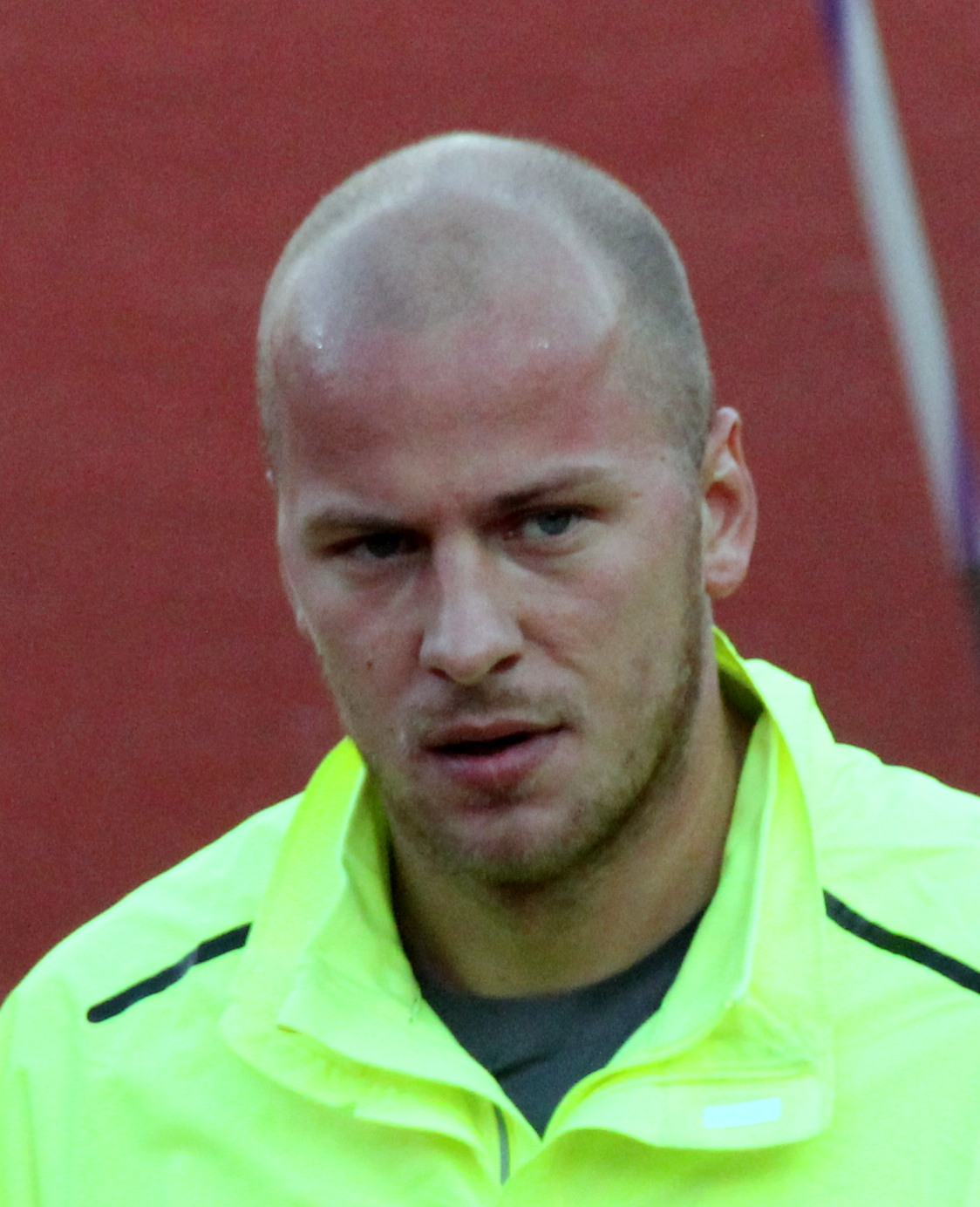
- Vadims Vasiļevskis in 2012

Personal information
- Nationality: Latvian
- Born: 5 January 1982 (age 44) Rīga, Latvian SSR, Soviet Union
- Height: 1.89 m (6 ft 2 1/2 in)
- Weight: 102 kg (225 lb)

Sport
- Country: Latvia
- Sport: Track and field
- Event: Javelin throw

Achievements and titles
- Olympic finals: 2004, 2008
- Personal bests: NR 90.73 m (2007)
Medal record
Men's Athletics
Representing Latvia
Olympic Games
Silver medal – second place	2004 Athens	Javelin
Universiade
Gold medal – first place	2007 Bangkok	Javelin

Vadims Vasiļevskis (born 5 January 1982) is a retired Latvian track and field athlete who competed in the javelin throw. He won silver at the 2004 Summer Olympics. His personal best throw of 90.73 m, set in 2007, is the Latvian record. In 2008, Vasiļevskis was awarded the Latvian Order of the Three Stars for his achievements in athletics.

== Career ==
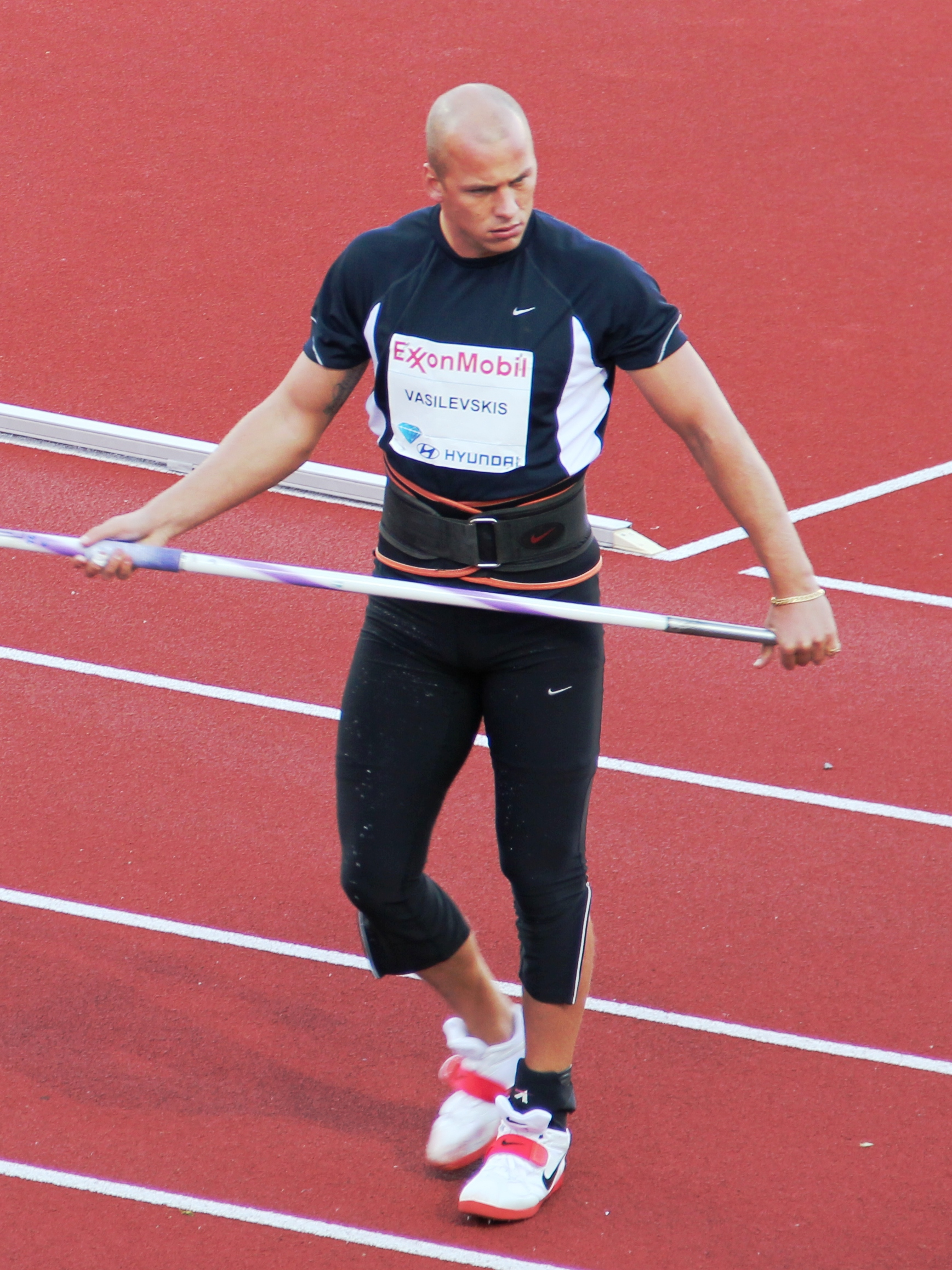
Vasiļevskis at the 2010 Bislett Games.

He has been coached by Valentīna Eiduka. In his early career he finished eighth at the 2000 World Junior Championships and competed at the 2002 European Championships without reaching the final.

Vasiļevskis was the Latvian flag bearer at the 2004 Summer Olympics. He was the biggest surprise among Latvia's medal winners in 2004 Olympics. Latvia had three competitors in javelin throw: Vasiļevskis, Ēriks Rags and Voldemārs Lūsis, with Vasiļevskis being the youngest and the least known of the three. In Olympics, Vasiļevskis was the best of the three, throwing for 84.95 metres, two and a half meters further than his previous personal best and good enough to win a silver medal.

After the Olympic silver he finished eighth at the 2004 World Athletics Final. After an unsuccessful 2005 World Championships where he did not reach the final round, he stood fourth in the 2006 European Championships, the 2006 World Athletics Final and the 2007 World Championships. He won a gold medal at the 2007 Summer Universiade, and finished ninth at the 2008 Olympic Games. He was the Latvian flag bearer at the 2008 Summer Olympics as well.

== Seasons bests by year ==
- 1999 – 63.82
- 2000 – 73.07
- 2001 – 73.25
- 2002 – 81.92
- 2003 – 77.81
- 2004 – 84.95
- 2005 – 81.30
- 2006 – 90.43
- 2007 – 90.73
- 2008 – 86.65
- 2009 – 90.71
- 2010 – 84.08
- 2011 – 88.22
- 2012 – 86.50
- 2013 – 82.79
- 2014 – 76.42
