= Tero Pitkämäki =

Finnish javelin thrower

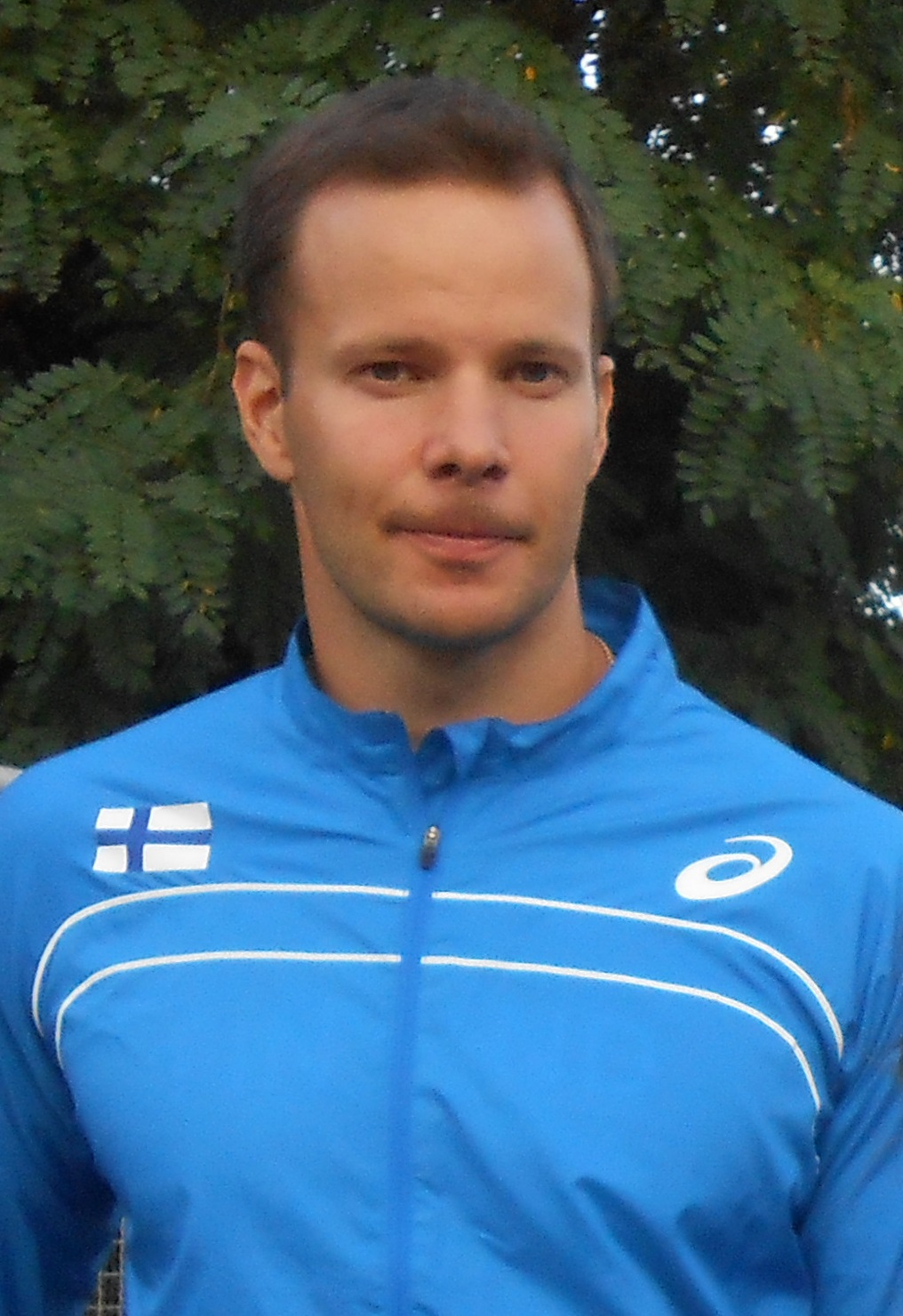
- Tero Pitkämäki in 2014

Personal information
- Born: 19 December 1982 (age 43) Ilmajoki, Finland
- Height: 1.95 m (6 ft 5 in)
- Weight: 92 kg (203 lb)

Sport
- Country: Finland
- Sport: Track and field
- Event: Javelin throw
- Club: Nurmon Urheilijat

Achievements and titles
- Personal best: 91.53 m (2005)
Medal record
Men's athletics
Representing Finland
Event	1st	2nd	3rd
Olympic Games	0	0	1
World Championships	1	1	1
European Championships	0	1	2
Total	1	2	4
Olympic Games
Bronze medal – third place	2008 Beijing	Javelin
World Championships
Gold medal – first place	2007 Osaka	Javelin
Silver medal – second place	2013 Moscow	Javelin
Bronze medal – third place	2015 Beijing	Javelin
European Championships
Silver medal – second place	2006 Gothenburg	Javelin
Bronze medal – third place	2010 Barcelona	Javelin
Bronze medal – third place	2014 Zürich	Javelin

Tero Kristian Pitkämäki (born 19 December 1982) is a Finnish retired track and field athlete who competed in the javelin throw. He is a World Champion, having won gold in 2007. His personal best throw of 91.53 m, set in 2005, ranks him twelfth on the overall list.

== Early life ==
Pitkämäki was born on 19 December 1982. He is from the rural village of Ahonkylä in Ilmajoki. His interest in the javelin throw began at the age of eight. He was inspired by watching the 1991 World Championships, where Kimmo Kinnunen and Seppo Räty won both gold and silver for Finland. Afterwards, Pitkämäki competed in a youth competition in Koskenkorva (Ilmajoki), where he threw the javelin 22 metres, 10 metres ahead of the runner-up. He regularly practiced throwing at home, once piercing his neighbour's roof.

== Career ==
Pitkämäki finished 8th in the javelin at the 2004 Summer Olympics with the result 83.01 m and has since developed into one of the world's leading javelin throwers. As of August 2005, he had thrown 91.53 m, hence he was one of the favorites at the 2005 World Championships in Athletics, which were held in his home country. However, he was only fourth with a result of 81.27 m. Pitkämäki took his first medal by placing second at the 2006 European Championships in Athletics.

On Friday 13 July 2007, during the IAAF Golden League meet at Rome's Olimpico Stadium, Tero Pitkämäki threw a javelin too far left and hit French long jumper Salim Sdiri in the side of the back. Sdiri was rushed to a local Rome hospital with non life-threatening injuries.

On 5 August, Pitkämäki won his 4th Finnish championship in a row with a throw of 89.43 meters. In the 2007 World Championships in Athletics in Osaka, Japan, Pitkämäki secured gold medal in men's javelin with a throw of 89.16 meters. With his last throw in the competition, he bettered his final result to 90.33 meters.

On 5 October 2007, Tero Pitkämäki was honored with the European Athlete of the Year title by the EEA. His 11 wins over the season, including the World Champion title, Golden League in Oslo and Paris, and his season best, also best in Europe, 91.23 meter throw, were the factors for choosing him. In December, Pitkämäki was voted Finnish Sportsman of the Year by the members of the Finnish Sport Journalists Association, beating women's triple world cross-country skiing champion Virpi Kuitunen and Formula One world champion Kimi Räikkönen.

In September 2015, Pitkämäki received his first title from the Diamond League.

Pitkämäki announced his retirement from competition on 14 October 2019. He had ruptured his anterior cruciate ligament in June 2018 and began rehabilitation in August of that year. He recovered from the injury and did not experience pain during practice, but felt that the functionality of the knee had reduced significantly. He said his throws in summer 2019 were around 75 m, and that he did not believe he was capable of being competitive at the 2019 World Athletics Championships. Pitkämäki had planned to finish his career at the 2020 Summer Olympics, but brought his retirement forward. He stated at his retirement news conference: "When it became clear to me that I was no longer in the condition I wanted to be in and that I would no longer get there, my enthusiasm and motivation for the sport dried up. That is the biggest reason for the decision."

== Seasonal bests ==
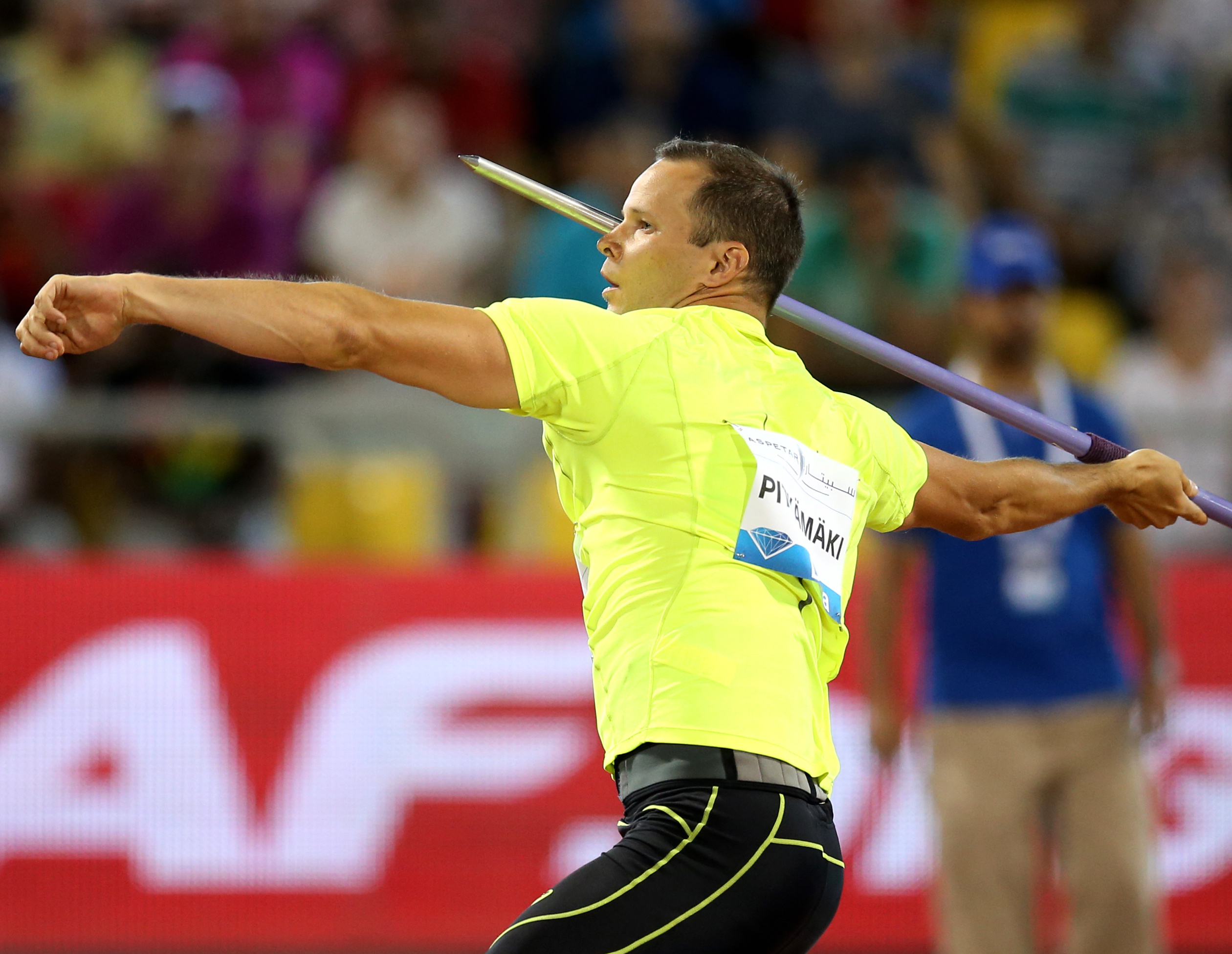
Pitkämäki in 2015

- 1999 – 66.83
- 2000 – 73.75
- 2001 – 74.89
- 2002 – 77.24
- 2003 – 80.45
- 2004 – 84.64
- 2005 – 91.53
- 2006 – 91.11
- 2007 – 91.23
- 2008 – 87.70
- 2009 – 87.79
- 2010 – 86.92
- 2011 – 85.33
- 2012 – 86.98
- 2013 – 89.03
- 2014 – 86.63
- 2015 – 89.09
- 2016 – 86.13
- 2017 – 88.27
- 2018 – 82.64
