= List of Czech Athletics Championships winners =

The Czech Athletics Championships (Czech: Mistrovství ČR v atletice) is an annual track and field competition which serves as the national championship for Czech Republic. It is organised by Czech Athletics Federation, the Czech Republic's national governing body for the sport of athletics. It superseded the Czechoslovak Athletics Championships as the national championship in 1993 upon Czech independence, though the competition was hosted as a sub-national event prior to then. A Czech Championships was held in 1970, separate from the Czechoslovak event that year.

== Men ==
=== 100 metres ===
- 1993: Jiří Valík
- 1994: Jiří Valík
- 1995: Jiří Valík
- 1996: Ivan Šlehobr
- 1997: Martin Duda
- 1998: Ivan Šlehobr
- 1999: Martin Duda
- 2000: Martin Duda
- 2001: Vít Havlícek
- 2002: Radek Zachoval
- 2003: Jiří Vojtík
- 2004: Martin Bren
- 2005: Jan Stokláska
- 2006: Rostislav Šulc

=== 200 metres ===
- 1993: Jiří Valík
- 1994: Jiří Valík
- 1995: Jiří Valík
- 1996: Ivan Šlehobr
- 1997: Martin Morkes
- 1998: Martin Morkes
- 1999: Martin Morkes
- 2000: Vít Havlícek
- 2001: Jiří Vojtík
- 2002: Jiří Vojtík
- 2003: Jiří Vojtík
- 2004: Jiří Vojtík
- 2005: Jiří Vojtík
- 2006: Jiří Vojtík

=== 400 metres ===
- 1993: Petr Puncochár
- 1994: Jiří Benda
- 1995: Jan Štejfa
- 1996: Jan Poděbradský
- 1997: Jiří Švenek
- 1998: Jan Poděbradský
- 1999: Karel Bláha
- 2000: Karel Bláha
- 2001: Karel Bláha
- 2002: Karel Bláha
- 2003: Václav Bláha
- 2004: Jan Hanzl
- 2005: Karel Bláha
- 2006: Karel Bláha

=== 800 metres ===
- 1993: Václav Hrích
- 1994: Pavel Soukup
- 1995: Pavel Soukup
- 1996: Filip Jedlík
- 1997: Lukáš Vydra
- 1998: Lukáš Vydra
- 1999: Karel Znojil
- 2000: Roman Oravec
- 2001: Stanislav Tábor
- 2002: Ondrej Kricka
- 2003: Roman Oravec
- 2004: Michal Šneberger
- 2005: Michal Šneberger
- 2006: Michal Šneberger

=== 1500 metres ===
- 1993: Milan Drahonovský
- 1994: Milan Drahonovský
- 1995: Milan Drahonovský
- 1996: Miloslav Suchý
- 1997: Miloslav Suchý
- 1998: Ondřej Moravec
- 1999: Lubomír Pokorný
- 2000: Michal Šneberger
- 2001: Michal Šneberger
- 2002: Michal Šneberger
- 2003: Petr Mlatecek
- 2004: Vladimír Bartunek
- 2005: Vladimír Bartunek
- 2006: Petr Doubravský

=== 5000 metres ===
- 1993: Jan Pešava
- 1994: Radim Kuncický
- 1995: Radomír Soukup
- 1996: Milan Drahonovský
- 1997: Milan Drahonovský
- 1998: Pavel Faschingbauer
- 1999: Pavel Faschingbauer
- 2000: Michael Nejedlý
- 2001: Tomáš Krutský
- 2002: Tomáš Krutský
- 2003: Michael Nejedlý
- 2004: Martin Kučera
- 2005: Jan Bláha
- 2006: Róbert Štefko

=== 10,000 metres ===
- 1993: Miroslav Sajler
- 1994: Jan Pešava
- 1995: Jan Pešava
- 1996: Jan Pešava
- 1997: Jan Pešava
- 1998: Jan Pešava
- 1999: Jiří Hnilicka
- 2000: Pavel Faschingbauer
- 2001: Pavel Faschingbauer
- 2002: Pavel Faschingbauer
- 2003: Jan Bláha
- 2004: Róbert Štefko
- 2005: Pavel Faschingbauer
- 2006: Jan Kreisinger

=== 10K run ===
- 1993: Michal Kučera
- 1994: Jan Pešava
- 1995: Luboš Šubrt
- 1996: Jan Pešava
- 1997: Jan Pešava
- 1998: Michal Jeránek
- 1999: Pavel Faschingbauer
- 2000: Tomáš Krutský
- 2001: Pavel Faschingbauer
- 2002: Pavel Faschingbauer
- 2003: David Gerych
- 2004: Róbert Štefko
- 2005: Róbert Štefko

=== Half marathon ===
- 1994: Jan Bláha
- 1995: Luboš Šubrt
- 1996: Zdenek Mezuliáník
- 1997: Jan Pešava
- 1998: Jiří Hajzler
- 1999: Pavel Faschingbauer
- 2000: Miroslav Vítek
- 2001: Jan Bláha
- 2002: Pavel Faschingbauer
- 2003: Pavel Faschingbauer
- 2004: Róbert Štefko
- 2005: Jan Bláha

=== Marathon ===
- 1993: Rudolf Jun
- 1994: Petr Klimeš
- 1995: Petr Bukovjan
- 1996: Vlastimil Bikovjan
- 1997: Václav Ožana
- 1998: Pavel Kryska
- 1999: Pavel Kryska
- 2000: Jan Bláha
- 2001: Jan Bláha
- 2002: Jiří Wallenfels
- 2003: Jan Bláha
- 2004: Róbert Štefko
- 2005: Jan Bláha
- 2006: Pavel Faschingbauer

=== 3000 metres steeplechase ===
- 1993: Jiří Šoptenko
- 1994: Jiří Šoptenko
- 1995: Michael Nejedlý
- 1996: Michael Nejedlý
- 1997: Michael Nejedlý
- 1998: Michael Nejedlý
- 1999: Michael Nejedlý
- 2000: Michael Nejedlý
- 2001: Michael Nejedlý
- 2002: Michael Nejedlý
- 2003: Michael Nejedlý
- 2004: Michael Nejedlý
- 2005: Michael Nejedlý
- 2006: David Gerych

=== 110 metres hurdles ===
- 1993: Jiří Hudec
- 1994: Tomáš Dvořák
- 1995: Tomáš Dvořák
- 1996: Tomáš Dvořák
- 1997: Tomáš Dvořák
- 1998: Tomáš Dvořák
- 1999: Tomáš Dvořák
- 2000: Tomáš Dvořák
- 2001: Tomáš Dvořák
- 2002: Roman Šebrle
- 2003: Stanislav Sajdok
- 2004: Stanislav Sajdok
- 2005: Stanislav Sajdok
- 2006: Stanislav Sajdok

=== 400 metres hurdles ===
- 1993: Petr Holubec
- 1994: Václav Novotný
- 1995: Lukáš Soucek
- 1996: Lukáš Soucek
- 1997: Jiří Mužík
- 1998: Štepán Tesarík
- 1999: Josef Rous
- 2000: Josef Rous
- 2001: Jiří Mužík
- 2002: Jiří Mužík
- 2003: Štepán Tesarík
- 2004: Jiří Mužík
- 2005: Michal Uhlík
- 2006: Michal Uhlík

=== High jump ===
- 1993: Tomáš Janků
- 1994: Tomáš Janků
- 1995: Jan Janků
- 1996: Tomáš Janků
- 1997: Jan Janků
- 1998: Tomáš Janků
- 1999: Tomáš Janků
- 2000: Tomáš Janků
- 2001: Jan Janků
- 2002: Tomáš Janků
- 2003: Jaroslav Bába
- 2004: Svatoslav Ton
- 2005: Jaroslav Bába
- 2006: Tomáš Janků

=== Pole vault ===
- 1993: Zdeněk Lubenský
- 1994: Martin Kysela
- 1995: Zdenek Šafár
- 1996: Martin Kysela
- 1997: Martin Kysela
- 1998: Štěpán Janáček
- 1999: Štěpán Janáček
- 2000: Štěpán Janáček
- 2001: Štěpán Janáček
- 2002: Adam Ptáček
- 2003: Adam Ptáček
- 2004: Adam Ptáček
- 2005: Aleš Honcl
- 2006: Adam Ptáček

=== Long jump ===
- 1993: Milan Gombala
- 1994: Milan Gombala
- 1995: Milan Gombala
- 1996: Milan Gombala
- 1997: Milan Kovár
- 1998: Roman Šebrle
- 1999: Roman Orlík
- 2000: Milan Kovár
- 2001: Milan Kovár
- 2002: Petr Hnízdil
- 2003: Petr Hnízdil
- 2004: Petr Lampart
- 2005: Štepán Wagner
- 2006: Tomáš Pour

=== Triple jump ===
- 1993: Jaroslav Mrštík
- 1994: Michal Coubal
- 1995: Radek Rezác
- 1996: Radek Rezác
- 1997: Jiří Kuntoš
- 1998: Jiří Kuntoš
- 1999: Jiří Kuntoš
- 2000: Jiří Kuntoš
- 2001: Tomáš Cholenský
- 2002: Petr Hnízdil
- 2003: Petr Hnízdil
- 2004: Tomáš Cholenský
- 2005: Tomáš Cholenský
- 2006: Petr Hnízdil

=== Shot put ===
- 1993: Miroslav Menc
- 1994: Miroslav Menc
- 1995: Miroslav Menc
- 1996: Miroslav Menc
- 1997: Miroslav Menc
- 1998: Petr Stehlík
- 1999: Petr Stehlík
- 2000: Miroslav Menc
- 2001: Petr Stehlík
- 2002: Petr Stehlík
- 2003: Petr Stehlík
- 2004: Petr Stehlík
- 2005: Petr Stehlík
- 2006: Remigius Machura

=== Discus throw ===
- 1993: Imrich Bugár
- 1994: Imrich Bugár
- 1995: Marek Bílek
- 1996: Libor Malina
- 1997: Libor Malina
- 1998: Libor Malina
- 1999: Libor Malina
- 2000: Libor Racek
- 2001: Libor Malina
- 2002: Libor Malina
- 2003: Libor Malina
- 2004: Libor Malina
- 2005: Libor Malina
- 2006: Libor Malina

=== Hammer throw ===
- 1993: Pavel Sedláček
- 1994: Pavel Sedláček
- 1995: Pavel Sedláček
- 1996: Pavel Sedláček
- 1997: Pavel Sedláček
- 1998: Vladimír Maška
- 1999: Vladimír Maška
- 2000: Vladimír Maška
- 2001: Vladimír Maška
- 2002: Vladimír Maška
- 2003: Lukáš Melich
- 2004: Vladimír Maška
- 2005: Vladimír Maška
- 2006: Lukáš Melich

=== Javelin throw ===
- 1993: Miloš Steigauf
- 1994: Jan Železný
- 1995: Vladimír Novácek
- 1996: Jan Železný
- 1997: Patrick Landmesser
- 1998: Patrick Landmesser
- 1999: Patrick Landmesser
- 2000: Miroslav Guzdek
- 2001: Miroslav Guzdek
- 2002: Miroslav Guzdek
- 2003: Miroslav Guzdek
- 2004: Radek Pejrimovský
- 2005: Petr Belunek
- 2006: Jan Syrovátko

=== Decathlon ===
- 1993: Kamil Damašek
- 1994: Kamil Damašek
- 1995: Kamil Damašek
- 1996: Roman Šebrle
- 1997: Kamil Damašek
- 1998: Aleš Paštrnák
- 1999: Tomáš Komenda
- 2000: Aleš Paštrnák
- 2001: Pavel Havlícek
- 2002: Jan Poděbradský
- 2003: Vít Zákoucký
- 2004: Jan Poděbradský
- 2005: Josef Karas
- 2006: Josef Karas

=== 20 kilometres walk ===
- 1993: Jiří Malysa
- 1994: Hubert Sonnek
- 1995: Hubert Sonnek
- 1996: Hubert Sonnek
- 1997: Tomáš Kratochvíl
- 1998: Jiří Malysa
- 1999: Jiří Malysa
- 2000: Jiří Malysa
- 2001: Jiří Malysa
- 2002: Jiří Malysa
- 2003: Miloš Holuša
- 2004: Miloš Holuša
- 2005: Miloš Holuša
- 2006: Miloš Holuša

=== 50 kilometres walk ===
- 1993: Miloš Holuša
- 1994: Roman Bílek
- 1995: Hubert Sonnek
- 1996: Hubert Sonnek
- 1997: Hubert Sonnek
- 1998: Jaroslav Makovec
- 1999: Hubert Sonnek
- 2000: Miloš Holuša
- 2001: František Kmenta
- 2002: Jiří Šorm
- 2003: Miloš Holuša
- 2004: Jiří Malysa
- 2005: David Šnajdr
- 2006: Rudolf Cogan

=== Cross country (long course) ===
- 1993: Jan Pešava
- 1994: Michal Kučera
- 1995: Michal Kučera
- 1996: Michal Kučera
- 1997: Jan Pešava
- 1998: Pavel Faschingbauer
- 1999: Pavel Faschingbauer
- 2000: Pavel Faschingbauer
- 2001: Tomáš Krutský
- 2002: Tomáš Krutský
- 2003: David Gerych
- 2004: Pavel Faschingbauer
- 2005: David Gerych

=== Cross country (short course) ===
- 1998: Michal Vokolek
- 1999: Tomáš Krutský
- 2000: Tomáš Krutský
- 2001: Zdenek Dúbravcík
- 2002: Zdenek Dúbravcík
- 2003: Jiří Miler
- 2004: Michael Nejedlý
- 2005: Jiří Miler

=== Mountain running ===
- 1993: Radomír Soukup
- 1994: Ladislav Raim
- 1995: Radomír Soukup
- 1996: Jan Pešava
- 1997: Radomír Soukup
- 1998: Miroslav Vítek
- 1999: Pavel Faschingbauer
- 2000: Jan Bláha
- 2001: Pavel Faschingbauer
- 2002: Pavel Faschingbauer
- 2003: Jan Bláha
- 2004: Miroslav Vítek
- 2005: Jan Havlícek

== Women ==
=== 100 metres ===
- 1993: Hana Benešová
- 1994: Erika Suchovská
- 1995: Zdenka Mušínská
- 1996: Gabriela Švecová
- 1997: Hana Benešová
- 1998: Erika Suchovská
- 1999: Erika Suchovská
- 2000: Lenka Ficková
- 2001: Erika Suchovská
- 2002: Hana Benešová
- 2003: Tereza Košková
- 2004: Štepánka Klapácová
- 2005: Štepánka Klapácová
- 2006: Kristina Bažatová

=== 200 metres ===
- 1993: Hana Benešová
- 1994: Erika Suchovská
- 1995: Erika Suchovská
- 1996: Hana Benešová
- 1997: Pavlína Vostatková
- 1998: Pavlína Vostatková
- 1999: Hana Benešová
- 2000: Helena Fuchsová
- 2001: Lenka Ficková
- 2002: Hana Benešová
- 2003: Hana Benešová
- 2004: Štepánka Klapácová
- 2005: Denisa Rosolová
- 2006: Štepánka Klapácová

=== 400 metres ===
- 1993: Nadežda Koštovalová
- 1994: Nadežda Koštovalová
- 1995: Hana Benešová
- 1996: Helena Fuchsová
- 1997: Helena Fuchsová
- 1998: Jitka Burianová
- 1999: Helena Fuchsová
- 2000: Jitka Burianová
- 2001: Tereza Žížalová
- 2002: Ludmila Formanová
- 2003: Eva Follnerová
- 2004: Zuzana Bergrová
- 2005: Jitka Bartoničková
- 2006: Zuzana Hejnová

=== 800 metres ===
- 1993: Eva Kasalová
- 1994: Ludmila Formanová
- 1995: Ludmila Formanová
- 1996: Eva Kasalová
- 1997: Ludmila Formanová
- 1998: Eva Kasalová
- 1999: Ludmila Formanová
- 2000: Ludmila Formanová
- 2001: Petra Sedláková
- 2002: Renata Hoppová
- 2003: Petra Lochmanová
- 2004: Veronika Mrácková
- 2005: Petra Lochmanová
- 2006: Veronika Mrácková

=== 1500 metres ===
- 1993: Ivana Kubešová
- 1994: Vera Kuncická
- 1995: Andrea Šuldesová
- 1996: Romana Sanigová
- 1997: Renata Hoppová
- 1998: Michaela Kutišová
- 1999: Andrea Šuldesová
- 2000: Renata Hoppová
- 2001: Renata Hoppová
- 2002: Renata Hoppová
- 2003: Andrea Šuldesová
- 2004: Andrea Šuldesová
- 2005: Marcela Lustigová
- 2006: Tereza Capková

=== 3000 metres ===
- 1993: Vera Kuncická
- 1994: Vera Kuncická

=== 5000 metres ===
- 1995: Anna Bácová
- 1996: Jana Kuceríková
- 1997: Jana Kuceríková
- 1998: Petra Drajzajtlová
- 1999: Petra Drajzajtlová
- 2000: Alena Peterková
- 2001: Jana Klimešová
- 2002: Petra Kamínková
- 2003: Michaela Mannová
- 2004: Vendula Frintová
- 2005: Petra Kamínková
- 2006: Petra Kamínková

=== 10,000 metres ===
- 1993: Radka Pátková
- 1994: Alena Peterková
- 1995: Monika Deverová
- 1996: Iva Jurková
- 1997: Iva Jurková
- 1998: Jana Klimešová
- 1999: Renata Kvitová
- 2000: Alena Peterková
- 2001: Marie Volná
- 2002: Petra Kamínková
- 2003: Petra Kamínková
- 2004: Petra Kamínková
- 2005: Petra Kamínková
- 2006: Petra Kamínková

=== 10K run ===
- 1993: Alena Peterková
- 1994: Desana Šourková
- 1995: Desana Šourková
- 1996: Iva Jurková
- 1997: Jana Klimešová
- 1998: Jana Klimešová
- 1999: Petra Drajzajtlová
- 2000: Petra Drajzajtlová
- 2001: Petra Drajzajtlová
- 2002: Petra Kamínková
- 2003: Petra Kamínková
- 2004: Petra Kamínková
- 2005: Petra Kamínková

=== Half marathon ===
- 1994: Radka Pátková
- 1995: Alena Peterková
- 1996: Monika Deverová
- 1997: Iva Jurková
- 1998: Dita Hebelková
- 1999: Jana Klimešová
- 2000: Renata Kvitová
- 2001: Petra Drajzajtlová
- 2002: Jana Klimešová
- 2003: Irena Šádková
- 2004: Radka Churánová
- 2005: Jana Klimešová

=== Marathon ===
- 1993: Alena Peterková
- 1994: Alena Peterková
- 1995: Alena Peterková
- 1996: Katerina Gerová-Sromová
- 1997: Vlasta Ruclová
- 1998: Tatána Metelková
- 1999: Tatána Metelková
- 2000: Alena Peterková
- 2001: Alena Peterková
- 2002: Jana Klimešová
- 2003: Ivana Martincová
- 2004: Radka Churánová
- 2005: Ivana Martincová
- 2006: Ivana Martincová

=== 3000 metres steeplechase ===
- 2001: Zuzana Rücklová
- 2002: Jana Biolková
- 2003: Jana Biolková
- 2004: Michaela Mannová
- 2005: Barbora Kuncová
- 2006: Lenka Ptácková

=== 100 metres hurdles ===
- 1993: Iveta Rudová
- 1994: Iveta Rudová
- 1995: Petra Šímová
- 1996: Iveta Rudová
- 1997: Iveta Rudová
- 1998: Andrea Novotná
- 1999: Iveta Rudová
- 2000: Michaela Hejnová
- 2001: Lucie Škrobáková
- 2002: Michaela Hejnová
- 2003: Lucie Škrobáková
- 2004: Lucie Škrobáková
- 2005: Lucie Škrobáková
- 2006: Petra Seidlová

=== 400 metres hurdles ===
- 1993: Zuzana Machotková
- 1994: Ivana Sekyrová
- 1995: Dagmar Votocková
- 1996: Dagmar Urbánková
- 1997: Martina Blažková
- 1998: Martina Blažková
- 1999: Dagmar Votocková
- 2000: Dagmar Votocková
- 2001: Alena Rücklová
- 2002: Alena Rücklová
- 2003: Lucie Sichertová
- 2004: Alena Rücklová
- 2005: Alena Rücklová
- 2006: Alena Rücklová

=== High jump ===
- 1993: Šárka Nováková
- 1994: Zuzana Hlavoňová
- 1995: Zuzana Hlavoňová
- 1996: Zuzana Hlavoňová
- 1997: Zuzana Hlavoňová
- 1998: Inga Janku
- 1999: Zuzana Hlavoňová
- 2000: Zuzana Hlavoňová
- 2001: Barbora Laláková
- 2002: Zuzana Hlavoňová
- 2003: Zuzana Hlavoňová
- 2004: Romana Dubnová
- 2005: Iva Straková
- 2006: Barbora Laláková

=== Pole vault ===
- 1993: Daniela Bártová
- 1994: Daniela Bártová
- 1995: Daniela Bártová
- 1996: Daniela Bártová
- 1997: Daniela Bártová
- 1998: Daniela Bártová
- 1999: Pavla Hamáčková-Rybová
- 2000: Daniela Bártová
- 2001: Kateřina Baďurová
- 2002: Šárka Mládková
- 2003: Pavla Hamáčková-Rybová
- 2004: Kateřina Baďurová
- 2005: Pavla Hamáčková-Rybová
- 2006: Pavla Hamáčková-Rybová

=== Long jump ===
- 1993: Monika Kohoutová
- 1994: Gabriela Vánová
- 1995: Helena Vinarová
- 1996: Helena Vinarová
- 1997: Martina Žabková
- 1998: Martina Žabková
- 1999: Martina Šestáková
- 2000: Šárka Beránková
- 2001: Lucie Komrsková
- 2002: Lucie Komrsková
- 2003: Lucie Komrsková
- 2004: Denisa Rosolová
- 2005: Martina Šestáková
- 2006: Lucie Komrsková

=== Triple jump ===
- 1993: Šárka Kašpárková
- 1994: Šárka Kašpárková
- 1995: Alena Nezdarilová
- 1996: Šárka Kašpárková
- 1997: Šárka Kašpárková
- 1998: Šárka Kašpárková
- 1999: Eva Doležalová
- 2000: Šárka Kašpárková
- 2001: Dagmar Urbánková
- 2002: Jana Velďáková
- 2003: Martina Šestáková
- 2004: Šárka Kašpárková
- 2005: Martina Šestáková
- 2006: Šárka Kašpárková

=== Shot put ===
- 1993: Sona Vašícková
- 1994: Alice Matějková
- 1995: Zdeňka Šilhavá
- 1996: Zdeňka Šilhavá
- 1997: Zdeňka Šilhavá
- 1998: Lucie Vrbenská
- 1999: Zdeňka Šilhavá
- 2000: Zdeňka Šilhavá
- 2001: Věra Pospíšilová-Cechlová
- 2002: Věra Pospíšilová-Cechlová
- 2003: Jana Kárníková
- 2004: Jana Kárníková
- 2005: Jana Kárníková
- 2006: Jana Kárníková

=== Discus throw ===
- 1993: Vladimíra Racková
- 1994: Alice Matějková
- 1995: Zdeňka Šilhavá
- 1996: Alice Matějková
- 1997: Alice Matějková
- 1998: Alice Matějková
- 1999: Zdeňka Šilhavá
- 2000: Vladimíra Racková
- 2001: Vladimíra Racková
- 2002: Vladimíra Racková
- 2003: Věra Pospíšilová-Cechlová
- 2004: Věra Pospíšilová-Cechlová
- 2005: Věra Pospíšilová-Cechlová
- 2006: Věra Pospíšilová-Cechlová

=== Hammer throw ===
- 1995: Markéta Procházková
- 1996: Markéta Procházková
- 1997: Markéta Procházková
- 1998: Jana Lejsková
- 1999: Lucie Vrbenská
- 2000: Lucie Vrbenská
- 2001: Lucie Vrbenská
- 2002: Lucie Vrbenská
- 2003: Lucie Vrbenská
- 2004: Lucie Vrbenská
- 2005: Lucie Vrbenská
- 2006: Lenka Ledvinová

=== Javelin throw ===
- 1993: Nikola Brejchová
- 1994: Nikola Brejchová
- 1995: Nikola Brejchová
- 1996: Nikola Brejchová
- 1997: Nikola Brejchová
- 1998: Nikola Brejchová
- 1999: Nikola Brejchová
- 2000: Nikola Brejchová
- 2001: Nikola Brejchová
- 2002: Nikola Brejchová
- 2003: Barbora Špotáková
- 2004: Nikola Brejchová
- 2005: Barbora Špotáková
- 2006: Barbora Špotáková

=== Heptathlon ===
- 1993: Dagmar Urbánková
- 1994: Dana Jandová
- 1995: Katerina Nekolná
- 1996: Helena Vinarová
- 1997: Jana Klecková
- 1998: Katerina Nekolná
- 1999: Katerina Nekolná
- 2000: Šárka Beránková
- 2001: Katerina Nekolná
- 2002: Šárka Beránková
- 2003: Jennifer Oeser (GER)
- 2004: Michaela Hejnová
- 2005: Michaela Hejnová
- 2006: Denisa Rosolová

=== 10 kilometres walk ===
- 1993: Kamila Holpuchová
- 1994: Kamila Holpuchová
- 1995: Kamila Holpuchová
- 1996: Tamara Heroldová
- 1997: Tamara Heroldová
- 1998: Pavla Choderová
- 1999: Ludmila Rychnovská
- 2000: Lucie Nedomová

=== 20 kilometres walk ===
- 2001: Barbora Dibelková
- 2002: Barbora Dibelková
- 2003: Barbora Dibelková
- 2004: Barbora Dibelková
- 2005: Barbora Dibelková
- 2006: Lucie Pelantová

=== Cross country ===
- 1993: Vera Kuncická
- 1994: Desana Šourková
- 1995: Desana Šourková
- 1996: Jana Klimešová
- 1997: Jana Klimešová
- 1998: Alena Peterková
- 1999: Petra Drajzajtlová
- 2000: Jana Biolková
- 2001: Jana Klimešová
- 2002: Jana Biolková
- 2003: Jana Biolková
- 2004: Irena Petríková
- 2005: Vendula Frintová

=== Mountain running ===
- 1993: Dagmar Havlícková
- 1994: Dagmar Havlícková
- 1995: Renata Schlesingerová
- 1996: Dita Hebelková
- 1997: Anna Bácová
- 1998: Dita Hebelková
- 1999: Irena Šádková
- 2000: Anna Pichrtová
- 2001: Anna Pichrtová
- 2002: Irena Šádková
- 2003: Irena Šádková
- 2004: Pavla Havlová
- 2005: Anna Pichrtová
