= 2003 World Championships in Athletics – Men's javelin throw =

These are the official results of the Men's Javelin Throw event at the 2003 World Championships in Paris, France. There were a total number of 21 participating athletes, with the final held on Sunday 31 August 2003.

== Medalists ==
Gold	Sergey Makarov; Russia (RUS)
Silver	Andrus Värnik; Estonia (EST)
Bronze	Boris Henry; Germany (GER)

== Schedule ==
- All times are Central European Time (UTC+1)

Qualification Round
Group A	Group B
29.08.2003 – 18:30h	29.08.2003 – 20:25h
Final Round
31.08.2003 – 16:50h

== Abbreviations ==
- All results shown are in metres

Q	automatic qualification
q	qualification by rank
DNS	did not start
NM	no mark
WR	world record
AR	area record
NR	national record
PB	personal best
SB	season best

== Records ==
Standing records prior to the 2003 World Athletics Championships
World Record	Jan Železný (CZE)	98.48 m	May 25, 1996	Jena, Germany
Event Record	Jan Železný (CZE)	92.80 m	August 12, 2001	Edmonton, Canada
Season Best	Sergey Makarov (RUS)	90.11 m	May 30, 2003	Dessau, Germany

== Qualification ==
=== Group A ===
Rank	Overall	Athlete	Throws			Result	Note
Rank	Overall	Athlete	1	2	3	Result	Note
1	1	Boris Henry (GER)	83.43	—	—	83.43 m	
2	3	Sergey Makarov (RUS)	82.22	—	—	82.22 m	
3	4	Li Rongxiang (CHN)	79.76	79.01	81.76	81.76 m	SB
4	5	Andrus Värnik (EST)	81.11	—	—	81.11 m	
5	7	Steve Backley (GBR)	79.27	80.23	X	80.23 m	
6	10	Aki Parviainen (FIN)	X	78.91	X	78.91 m	
7	12	Miroslav Guzdek (CZE)	71.96	74.71	77.24	77.24 m	
8	18	Voldemārs Lūsis (LAT)	71.72	X	75.15	75.15 m	
9	19	Gergely Horváth (HUN)	X	74.76	72.03	74.76 m	
10	20	Isbel Luaces (CUB)	74.07	X	72.67	74.07 m	
11	21	Nery Kennedy (PAR)	67.62	X	68.83	68.83 m	

=== Group B ===
Rank	Overall	Athlete	Throws			Result	Note
Rank	Overall	Athlete	1	2	3	Result	Note
1	2	Jan Železný (CZE)	82.88	—	—	82.88 m	
2	6	Christian Nicolay (GER)	80.54	X	X	80.54 m	
3	8	Andreas Thorkildsen (NOR)	75.75	76.67	79.44	79.44 m	
4	9	Alexandr Ivanov (RUS)	79.26	X	X	79.26 m	
5	11	Peter Blank (GER)	73.19	74.56	78.48	78.48 m	
6	13	Vadim Bavikin (ISR)	71.77	77.06	X	77.06 m	
7	14	Breaux Greer (USA)	76.82	74.21	74.50	76.82 m	
8	15	Sergey Voynov (UZB)	76.66	72.78	76.31	76.66 m	
9	16	Emeterio González (CUB)	X	76.18	72.40	76.18 m	
10	17	Ēriks Rags (LAT)	70.19	X	75.72	75.72 m	

== Final ==
Rank	Athlete	Throws						Result	Note
Rank	Athlete	1	2	3	4	5	6	Result	Note
1st place, gold medalist(s)	Sergey Makarov (RUS)	85.44	X	X	82.72	82.11	85.31	85.44 m	
2nd place, silver medalist(s)	Andrus Värnik (EST)	85.17	X	X	81.98	X	80.51	85.17 m	
3rd place, bronze medalist(s)	Boris Henry (GER)	84.74	82.41	83.32	X	82.14	83.44	84.74 m	
4.	Jan Železný (CZE)	82.98	X	84.09	X	X	81.24	84.09 m	
5.	Aki Parviainen (FIN)	83.05	76.63	79.90	75.79	X	77.78	83.05 m	
6.	Christian Nicolay (GER)	80.85	81.77	X	80.60	X	81.26	81.77 m	
7.	Miroslav Guzdek (CZE)	77.99	81.40	X	75.67	77.32	78.54	81.40 m	
8.	Peter Blank (GER)	80.34	X	76.29	X	79.39	78.43	80.34 m	
9.	Steve Backley (GBR)	79.35	79.90	80.13				80.13 m	
10.	Li Rongxiang (CHN)	78.24	X	77.02				78.24 m	
11.	Andreas Thorkildsen (NOR)	77.75	X	X				77.75 m	
12.	Alexandr Ivanov (RUS)	77.32	X	X				77.32 m	

== See also ==
- 1998 Men's European Championships Javelin Throw (Budapest)
- 2000 Men's Olympic Javelin Throw (Sydney)
- 2002 Men's European Championships Javelin Throw (Munich)
- 2004 Men's Olympic Javelin Throw (Athens)
