= 1998 European Athletics Championships – Men's javelin throw =

Men's javelin throw at the European Athletics Championships

These are the official results of the Men's javelin throw event at the 1998 European Championships in Budapest, Hungary. There were a total number of 26 participating athletes. The final was held on 23 August 1998, two days after the qualification round where the mark was set at 82.00 metres. Title defender Steve Backley from Great Britain won the title for a third time in a row, setting a new championship record in the final round: 89.72 metres.

== Medalists ==
Gold	(United Kingdom) Steve Backley; Great Britain (GBR)
Silver	(United Kingdom) Mick Hill; Great Britain (GBR)
Bronze	Raymond Hecht; Germany (GER)

== Schedule ==
- All times are Central European Time (UTC+1)

Qualification Round
Group A	Group B
21.08.1998 – 10:00h	21.08.1998 – 11:40h
Final Round
23.08.1998 – 18:00h

== Abbreviations ==
- All results shown are in metres

Q	automatic qualification
q	qualification by rank
DNS	did not start
NM	no mark
WR	world record
AR	area record
NR	national record
PB	personal best
SB	season best

== Records ==
Standing records prior to the 1998 European Athletics Championships
World Record	Jan Železný (CZE)	98.48 m	May 25, 1996	Jena, Germany
Event Record	Steve Backley (GBR)	85.20 m	August 8, 1994	Helsinki, Finland
Broken records during the 1998 European Athletics Championships
Event Record	Steve Backley (GBR)	89.72 m	August 23, 1998	Budapest, Hungary

== Competitors ==
- European list as of August 17, 1998, just before the start of the competition

Rank	Athlete	Season Best	Personal Best
1	Aki Parviainen (FIN)	90.88	87.48
2	Steve Backley (GBR)	89.89	91.46
3	Boris Henry (GER)	89.21	90.44
4	Kostas Gatsioudis (GRE)	88.13	89.22
5	Raymond Hecht (GER)	88.08	92.60
6	Peter Blank (GER)	86.99	88.12
7	Juha Laukkanen (FIN)	86.96	88.22
8	Mark Roberson (GBR)	85.67	80.92
9	Sergey Makarov (RUS)	85.64	88.86
10	Harri Hakkarainen (FIN)	85.28	87.82
11	Patrik Bodén (SWE)	85.15	89.10
12	Pål Arne Fagernes (NOR)	84.46	85.06
13	Matti Närhi (FIN)	84.38	88.24
14	Kimmo Kinnunen (FIN)	84.23	85.32
15	Peter Esenwein (GER)	84.17	85.60
16	Mick Hill (GBR)	83.94	86.94
17	Sami Saksio (FIN)	83.37	84.26
18	Yuriy Rybin (RUS)	83.08	86.98
19	Carlo Sonego (ITA)	82.44	74.90
20	Gregor Högler (AUT)	81.89	83.00
21	Andreas Linden (GER)	81.89	85.42
22	Esko Mikkola (FIN)	81.86	76.08
23	Gaetan Siakinuu (FRA)	81.75	76.88
24	Johan Kloeck (BEL)	81.18	78.46
25	Ēriks Rags (LAT)	80.56	79.04
26	Gergely Horváth (HUN)	80.53	73.96

== Qualification ==
=== Group A ===
Rank	Overall	Athlete	Attempts			Distance
Rank	Overall	Athlete	1	2	3	Distance
1	3	Peter Blank (GER)	75.96	75.45	83.41	83.41 m
2	6	Sergey Makarov (RUS)	80.98	X	—	80.98 m
3	8	Aki Parviainen (FIN)	X	80.65	X	80.65 m
4	9	Gregor Högler (AUT)	80.28	80.47	77.54	80.47 m
5	11	Dariusz Trafas (POL)	79.86	78.42	77.16	79.86 m
6	12	Mark Roberson (GBR)	74.46	79.63	X	79.63 m
7	15	Carlo Sonego (ITA)	77.74	76.80	X	77.74 m
8	16	Pål Arne Fagernes (NOR)	77.54	X	X	77.54 m
9	19	Gergely Horváth (HUN)	74.82	75.66	74.47	75.66 m
10	20	Voldemārs Lūsis (LAT)	X	X	75.14	75.14 m
11	24	Dejan Angelovski (MKD)	70.77	71.78	70.18	71.78 m
12	25	Gaetan Siakinuu (FRA)	69.95	X	65.53	69.95 m

=== Group B ===
Rank	Overall	Athlete	Attempts			Distance
Rank	Overall	Athlete	1	2	3	Distance
1	1	Steve Backley (GBR)	87.45	—	—	87.45 m
2	2	Juha Laukkanen (FIN)	83.71	—	—	83.71 m
3	4	Raymond Hecht (GER)	76.21	83.32	—	83.32 m
4	5	Patrik Bodén (SWE)	79.02	81.01	—	81.01 m
5	7	Matti Närhi (FIN)	72.32	X	80.94	80.94 m
6	10	Mick Hill (GBR)	X	X	80.14	80.14 m
7	13	Vladimir Sasimovich (BLR)	79.14	79.06	76.66	79.14 m
8	14	Andreas Linden (GER)	78.98	X	X	78.98 m
9	17	Dimitrios Polymerou (GRE)	77.49	X	X	77.49 m
10	18	Arūnas Jurkšas (LTU)	75.40	74.73	77.37	77.37 m
11	21	Ēriks Rags (LAT)	74.27	X	X	74.27 m
12	22	Yuriy Rybin (RUS)	72.86	X	X	72.86 m
13	23	Terry McHugh (IRL)	72.82	72.71	72.76	72.82 m

== Final ==
Rank	Athlete	Attempts						Distance	Note
Rank	Athlete	1	2	3	4	5	6	Distance	Note
1st place, gold medalist(s)	Steve Backley (GBR)	89.72	X	83.03	85.69	84.87	84.17	89.72 m	CR
2nd place, silver medalist(s)	Mick Hill (GBR)	83.80	79.07	83.41	85.77	86.92	85.72	86.92 m	
3rd place, bronze medalist(s)	Raymond Hecht (GER)	85.68	83.51	86.63	—	—	—	86.63 m	
4	Sergey Makarov (RUS)	86.45	80.47	80.86	—	—	79.83	86.45 m	
5	Juha Laukkanen (FIN)	84.78	X	X	X	X	77.72	84.78 m	
6	Mark Roberson (GBR)	80.41	79.38	83.64	84.15	77.42	X	84.15 m	
7	Peter Blank (GER)	83.66	78.65	X	77.20	76.87	X	83.66 m	
8	Matti Närhi (FIN)	82.59	X	79.33	80.77	X	X	82.59 m	
9	Aki Parviainen (FIN)	X	82.30	81.84				82.30 m	
10	Gregor Högler (AUT)	81.44	81.75	73.72				81.75 m	
11	Dariusz Trafas (POL)	79.53	74.79	79.77				79.77 m	
12	Patrik Bodén (SWE)	79.73	X	—				79.73 m	

== See also ==
- 1993 Men's World Championships Javelin Throw (Stuttgart)
- 1995 Men's World Championships Javelin Throw (Gothenburg)
- 1996 Men's Olympic Javelin Throw (Atlanta)
- 1997 Men's World Championships Javelin Throw (Athens)
- 1999 Men's World Championships Javelin Throw (Seville)
- 2000 Men's Olympic Javelin Throw (Sydney)
- 2001 Men's World Championships Javelin Throw (Edmonton)
