= Peter Blank =

German track and field athlete (born 1962)

Personal information
- Born: 10 April 1962 (age 64) Frankfurt am Main, West Germany

Sport
- Country: West Germany (–1990); Germany (1991–2003)
- Sport: Athletics
- Event: Javelin throw

Achievements and titles
- Personal bests: JT: 88.70 m (2001); HJ: 2.25 m (1986); Decathlon: 7,651 (1990)

Peter Blank (born 10 April 1962) is a German track and field athlete who competed in the javelin throw. Early on in his career, he was a decathlete. In 1992, he set the world record for longest javelin throw in a decathlon with a distance of 79.80 m.

His personal best throw is 88.70 m, achieved in June 2001 in Stuttgart at age 39. This throw was briefly a Masters M35 world record; it lasted less than a week because Jan Železný had turned 35 three weeks earlier and in his first competition after turning 35, Železný threw the javelin 89.94 m. Železný then further improved the record to 92.80 m at the 2001 World Championships, putting it beyond Blank's reach. Two years later, Blank set the M40 world record with an 84.08 m throw, but was again bested once Železný turned 40 and improved the record to 85.92 m. In 2007, Blank set the M45 world record, surpassing the record by Larry Stuart that had stood for 21 years. As of 2017, this record continues to stand, unsurpassed by Železný when he turned 45, or any other javelin thrower.

At the West German championships, Blank won his first medal in 1984, a bronze, followed by gold medals in 1988 and 1990. He took additional bronze medals at the German championships in 1993, 1995, 1998, 1999 and 2003; silver medals in 1994, 1996 and 1997; and his last gold medal in 2001. He represented the clubs LG Frankfurt, USC Mainz and Eintracht Frankfurt.

As a high jumper, he won bronze medals at the 1985 West German indoor championships and the 1986 West German championships.

== Achievements ==
Year	Competition	Venue	Position	Notes
Representing West Germany
1990	European Championships	Split, SFR Yugoslavia	25th	73.30 m
Representing Germany
1991	World Championships	Tokyo, Japan	11th	72.62 m
1993	World Championships	Stuttgart, Germany	29th	74.10 m
1994	European Championships	Helsinki, Finland	20th	74.88 m
1996	Olympic Games	Atlanta, United States	9th	81.82 m
1998	European Championships	Budapest, Hungary	7th	83.66 m
1999	World Championships	Seville, Spain	13th	80.89 m
2001	World Championships	Edmonton, Canada	17th	80.96 m
2003	World Championships	Paris, France	8th	80.34 m
2003	World Athletics Final	Monte Carlo, Monaco	6th	77.39 m
