= Nick Nieland =

British javelin thrower (born 1972)

Personal information
- Nationality: British (English)
- Born: 31 January 1972 (age 54) Truro, Cornwall, England
- Height: 190 cm (6 ft 3 in)
- Weight: 100 kg (220 lb)

Sport
- Sport: Athletics
- Event: Javelin
- Club: Shaftesbury Barnet Harriers
- Turned pro: 1995

Achievements and titles
- Highest world ranking: 14th (2006)
Medal record
Representing England
Commonwealth Games
| Gold medal – first place | 2006 Melbourne | Javelin throw |
| Bronze medal – third place | 2002 Manchester | Javelin throw |

Nicholas Peter Russell Nieland (born 31 January 1972 in) is a former javelin thrower from England who competed at three Olympic Games in 1996, 2000 and 2004.

== Biography ==
Nieland, born in Truro, Cornwall is a graduate of Bristol University with a BSc Chemistry 1994, and PhD Chemistry 1999.

He was the British number three for many years behind Steve Backley and Mick Hill but when his long-time domestic rival Steve Backley retired, Nieland rose to prominence to achieve a gold medal for England at the 2006 Commonwealth Games in Melbourne.

He later became number one in the UK. His personal best is 85.09m set in 2000 and his best throw in 2006 is 84.70m and set personal bests in the Olympic Trials in 1996 and 2000. Neiland was four-times British javelin throw champion after winning the British AAA Championships title in 1996, 2005, 2006 and 2007.

Nieland made his achievements in athletics from 2000 to 2007 while working as an equity analyst for a top investment bank in the City of London. After retirement he went on to become a strategic analyst for pharmaceutical firm Novartis, later joining the pharmaceutical research team of Citigroup.

== Achievements ==
| Year | Competition | Venue | Position | Notes |
|---|---|---|---|---|
| 1996 | Olympic Games | Atlanta, Georgia, United States | 25th | 75.74 m |
| 1997 | World Championships | Athens, Greece | 26th | 74.52 m |
| 1999 | World Championships | Seville, Spain | 28th | 72.12 m |
| 2000 | Olympic Games | Sydney, Australia | 13th | 82.12 m |
| 2001 | World Championships | Edmonton, Canada | 21st | 78.02 m |
| 2002 | European Championships | Munich, Germany | 25th | 71.92 m |
| 2004 | Olympic Games | Athens, Greece | 28th | 72.79 m |
| 2005 | World Championships | Helsinki, Finland | 13th | 76.71 m |
| 2006 | European Championships | Gothenburg, Sweden | 11th | 76.92 m |

== Seasonal bests by year ==
- 1995 - 76.30
- 1996 - 83.06
- 1997 - 78.76
- 1998 - 78.68
- 1999 - 83.68
- 2000 - 85.09
- 2001 - 82.93
- 2002 - 80.05
- 2003 - 82.97
- 2004 - 79.06
- 2005 - 79.56
- 2006 - 84.70
- 2007 - 79.04
