= Andrus Värnik =

Estonian javelin thrower

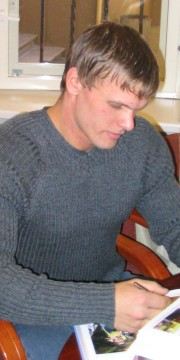
- Värnik in 2004

Personal information
- Born: 27 September 1977 (age 48) Antsla, then part of Estonian SSR, Soviet Union
- Height: 1.82 m (6 ft 0 in)
- Weight: 97 kg (214 lb)

Sport
- Country: Estonia
- Sport: Athletics
- Event: Javelin throw

Achievements and titles
- Personal bests: NR 87.83 m (2003)
Medal record
Men's athletics
Representing Estonia
World Championships
Gold medal – first place	2005 Helsinki	Javelin
Silver medal – second place	2003 Paris	Javelin

Andrus Värnik (born 27 September 1977) is a retired Estonian track and field athlete who competed in the javelin throw. He is a World Champion, having won gold in 2005. His personal best throw of 87.83 m, set in 2003, was the Estonian record for 15 years.

== Career ==
Värnik won his first international medal, a silver medal, in the 2003 World Championships in Athletics, throwing 85.17 m. The next year he finished sixth in the javelin contest at the Olympic Games with the result 83.25 m.

With 87.17 m he won a surprise gold medal at the 2005 World Championships in Athletics, ahead of Olympic champion Andreas Thorkildsen, defending World Champion Sergey Makarov and home favorite Tero Pitkämäki.

== Personal life ==
In 2007, Värnik participated as a celebrity contestant on the second season of Tantsud tähtedega, an Estonian version of Strictly Come Dancing. His professional dancing partner was Kaisa Oja.

On 16 January 2010, Värnik was caught drunk driving in Tallinn. He was banned from driving for 4 months and fined 12,000 kroons.

== Achievements ==
Year	Competition	Venue	Position	Result
Representing Estonia
1996	World Junior Championships	Sydney, Australia	23rd (q)	56.94 m
1999	European U23 Championships	Gothenburg, Sweden	14th	63.04 m
2000	Olympic Games	Sydney, Australia	15th	81.34 m
2002	European Championships	Munich, Germany	21st	75.66 m
2003	World Championships	Paris, France	2nd	85.17 m
2004	Olympic Games	Athens Olympic Stadium, Greece	6th	83.25 m
2005	World Championships	Helsinki Olympic Stadium, Finland	1st	87.17 m

== Seasonal bests by year ==
- 2000 – 82.16
- 2001 – 80.83
- 2002 – 85.47
- 2003 – 87.83
- 2004 – 87.58
- 2005 – 87.19
- 2006 – 84.85
- 2007 – 75.96
- 2008 – 81.11
- 2009 – 82.00
- 2010 – 74.50
- 2011 – 76.20

Awards
Preceded by Andrus Veerpalu	Estonian Sportsman of the Year; 2003	Succeeded by Jüri Jaanson
Preceded by Jüri Jaanson	Estonian Sportsman of the Year; 2005	Succeeded by Andrus Veerpalu
