= Rigondeaux =

Rigondeaux is a surname, likely of French origin. Notable people with the surname include:

- Guillermo Rigondeaux (born 1980), Cuban professional boxer
- Máximo Rigondeaux (born 1976), Cuban retired javelin thrower
