= Athletics at the 1996 Summer Olympics – Men's javelin throw =

Men's javelin throw at the Games of the XXVI Olympiad
- Pictogram for athletics
- Venue: Centennial Olympic Stadium
- Dates: 2 August (qualification); 3 August (final)
- Competitors: 34 from 21 nations
- Winning distance: 88.16

Medalists
1st place, gold medalist(s)		Jan Železný; Czech Republic
2nd place, silver medalist(s)		Steve Backley; Great Britain
3rd place, bronze medalist(s)		Seppo Räty; Finland

These are the official results of the Men's Javelin Throw event at the 1996 Summer Olympics in Atlanta, Georgia. There were 34 competitors, of which 12 qualified for the final. The qualification mark was set at 83.00 metres.

== Medalists ==
Gold	Jan Železný; Czech Republic
Silver	Steve Backley; Great Britain
Bronze	Seppo Räty; Finland

== Schedule ==
- All times are Eastern Time Zone (UTC-5)

Qualification Round
Group A	Group B
02.08.1996 – 09:30h	02.08.1996 – 11:00h
Final Round
03.08.1996 – 18:55h

== Abbreviations ==
- All results shown are in metres

Q	automatic qualification
q	qualification by rank
DNS	did not start
NM	no mark
OR	olympic record
WR	world record
AR	area record
NR	national record
PB	personal best
SB	season best

== Records ==
Standing records prior to the 1996 Summer Olympics
World Record	Jan Železný (CZE)	98.48 m	May 25, 1996	Jena, Germany
Olympic Record	Jan Železný (TCH)	89.66 m	August 8, 1992	Barcelona, Spain
Season Best	Jan Železný (CZE)	98.48 m	May 25, 1996	Jena, Germany

== Qualification ==
=== Group A ===
Rank	Overall	Athlete	Attempts			Distance
Rank	Overall	Athlete	1	2	3	Distance
1	1	Konstadinos Gatsioudis (GRE)	87.12	—	—	87.12 m
2	3	Sergey Makarov (RUS)	85.88	—	—	85.88 m
3	6	Seppo Räty (FIN)	83.66	—	—	83.66 m
4	7	Raymond Hecht (GER)	83.24	—	—	83.24 m
5	9	Peter Blank (GER)	82.68	X	—	82.68 m
6	10	Kimmo Kinnunen (FIN)	78.82	X	80.98	80.98 m
7	11	Mick Hill (GBR)	77.12	X	80.48	80.48 m
8	13	Pål Arne Fagernes (NOR)	78.38	X	79.78	79.78 m
9	15	Dave Stephens (USA)	77.98	79.18	79.18	79.18 m
10	18	Emeterio González (CUB)	X	77.94	74.42	77.94 m
11	20	Edgar Baumann (PAR)	X	75.90	77.74	77.74 m
12	23	Gavin Lovegrove (NZL)	X	77.12	X	77.12 m
13	24	Sergey Voynov (UZB)	75.58	76.30	68.50	76.30 m
14	26	Dag Wennlund (SWE)	75.24	X	X	75.24 m
15	29	Terry McHugh (IRL)	69.72	X	72.84	72.84 m
16	31	Chu Ki-Young (KOR)	X	70.30	71.42	71.42 m
17	33	Kirt Thompson (TRI)	68.02	X	64.12	68.02 m

=== Group B ===
Rank	Overall	Athlete	Attempts			Distance
Rank	Overall	Athlete	1	2	3	Distance
1	2	Jan Železný (CZE)	86.52	—	—	86.52 m
2	4	Tom Pukstys (USA)	80.70	81.34	84.70	84.70 m
3	5	Steve Backley (GBR)	84.14	—	—	84.14 m
4	8	Boris Henry (GER)	83.22	—	—	83.22 m
5	12	Zhang Lianbiao (CHN)	76.24	76.76	79.88	79.88 m
6	14	Harri Hakkarainen (FIN)	77.96	79.34	X	79.34 m
7	16	Vladimir Ovchinnikov (RUS)	74.88	76.12	78.20	78.20 m
8	17	Todd Riech (USA)	X	76.68	78.02	78.02 m
9	19	Dimitrios Polymerou (GRE)	76.98	X	77.82	77.82 m
10	21	Andrew Currey (AUS)	71.34	76.58	77.28	77.28 m
11	22	Andrey Moruyev (RUS)	X	76.96	77.20	77.20 m
12	25	Nick Nieland (GBR)	69.54	X	75.74	75.74 m
13	27	Vladimir Parfyonov (UZB)	68.54	73.96	73.28	73.96 m
14	28	Isbel Luaces (CUB)	73.84	73.20	X	73.84 m
15	30	Donald Sild (EST)	72.54	X	68.28	72.54 m
16	32	Pius Bazighe (NGR)	68.02	70.78	65.70	70.78 m
—	—	Vladimir Sasimovich (BLR)	X	X	X	NM

== Final ==
Rank	Athlete	Attempts						Distance
Rank	Athlete	1	2	3	4	5	6	Distance
1st place, gold medalist(s)	Jan Železný (CZE)	X	88.16	82.68	83.86	86.02	86.12	88.16 m
2nd place, silver medalist(s)	Steve Backley (GBR)	87.44	85.66	X	80.74	80.88	85.64	87.44 m
3rd place, bronze medalist(s)	Seppo Räty (FIN)	83.44	86.66	76.52	84.52	81.70	86.98	86.98 m
4	Raymond Hecht (GER)	83.88	86.88	X	83.10	X	85.10	86.88 m
5	Boris Henry (GER)	81.24	85.68	X	82.58	83.94	84.08	85.68 m
6	Sergey Makarov (RUS)	82.72	85.30	81.12	X	82.28	83.78	85.30 m
7	Kimmo Kinnunen (FIN)	82.72	80.26	X	84.02	81.98	X	84.02 m
8	Tom Pukstys (USA)	78.48	80.90	83.58	81.28	82.18	81.68	83.58 m
9	Peter Blank (GER)	76.66	81.82	X				81.82 m
10	Konstadinos Gatsioudis (GRE)	X	79.08	81.46				81.46 m
11	Zhang Lianbiao (CHN)	80.28	78.86	80.96				80.96 m
12	Mick Hill (GBR)	78.58	X	X				78.58 m

== See also ==
- 1993 Men's World Championships Javelin Throw (Stuttgart)
- 1994 Men's European Championships Javelin Throw (Stuttgart)
- 1995 Men's World Championships Javelin Throw (Gothenburg)
- 1996 Javelin Throw Year Ranking
- 1997 Men's World Championships Javelin Throw (Athens)
- 1998 Men's European Championships Javelin Throw (Budapest)
- 1999 Men's World Championships Javelin Throw (Seville)
