= 1997 World Championships in Athletics – Men's javelin throw =

These are the official results of the Men's Javelin Throw event at the 1997 World Championships in Athens, Greece. There were a total number of 40 participating athletes, with the final held on Tuesday 5 August 1997. The qualification mark was set at 83.00 metres.

== Medalists ==
Gold	Marius Corbett; South Africa (RSA)
Silver	(United Kingdom) Steve Backley; Great Britain (GBR)
Bronze	Kostas Gatsioudis; Greece (GRE)

== Schedule ==
- All times are Eastern European Time (UTC+2)

Qualification Round
Group A	Group B
03.08.1997 – 08:10h	03.08.1997 – 10:00h
Final Round
05.08.1997 – 18:40h

== Abbreviations ==
- All results shown are in metres

Q	automatic qualification
q	qualification by rank
DNS	did not start
NM	no mark
WR	world record
AR	area record
NR	national record
PB	personal best
SB	season best

== Records ==
Standing records prior to the 1997 World Athletics Championships
World Record	Jan Železný (CZE)	98.48 m	May 25, 1996	Jena, Germany
Event Record	Jan Železný (CZE)	89.58 m	August 13, 1995	Gothenburg, Sweden
Season Best	Jan Železný (CZE)	94.02 m	March 26, 1997	Stellenbosch, South Africa

== Qualification ==
=== Group A ===
Rank	Overall	Athlete	Attempts			Distance
Rank	Overall	Athlete	1	2	3	Distance
1	2	Boris Henry (GER)	81.80	79.34	83.42	83.42 m
2	3	Kostas Gatsioudis (GRE)	83.32	—	—	83.32 m
3	4	Mick Hill (GBR)	X	82.24	81.44	82.24 m
4	5	Gregor Högler (AUT)	79.54	78.44	81.54	81.54 m
5	8	Emeterio González (CUB)	X	X	80.88	80.88 m
6	10	Marius Corbett (RSA)	76.32	80.72	75.10	80.72 m
7	11	Sergey Makarov (RUS)	X	80.62	78.26	80.62 m
8	13	Raymond Hecht (GER)	78.88	79.38	X	79.38 m
9	15	Tom Pukstys (USA)	77.46	78.64	76.58	78.64 m
10	18	Sami Saksio (FIN)	75.42	76.20	X	76.20 m
11	20	Pål Arne Fagernes (NOR)	75.66	X	X	75.66 m
12	22	Ēriks Rags (LAT)	71.66	73.06	75.06	75.06 m
13	24	Roald Bradstock (USA)	74.92	71.88	71.70	74.92 m
14	26	Nick Nieland (GBR)	72.26	74.52	70.34	74.52 m
15	28	Firas Zaal Al-Mohammed (SYR)	74.04	70.90	X	74.04 m
16	29	Edgar Baumann (PAR)	X	72.96	63.88	72.96 m
17	33	Aleksandr Fingert (ISR)	69.74	69.20	68.56	69.74 m
18	37	Robert Tersek (SLO)	X	69.08	66.36	69.08 m
19	39	Vladimir Parfyonov (UZB)	55.18	62.48	X	62.48 m
20	40	Ponsianus Gnemen (INA)	X	57.12	56.32	57.12 m

=== Group B ===
Rank	Overall	Athlete	Attempts			Distance
Rank	Overall	Athlete	1	2	3	Distance
1	1	Jan Železný (CZE)	83.66	—	—	83.66 m
2	6	Steve Backley (GBR)	81.40	X	X	81.40 m
3	7	Patrik Bodén (SWE)	80.88	76.26	77.42	80.88 m
4	9	Aki Parviainen (FIN)	X	79.82	80.76	80.76 m
5	12	Andrey Moruyev (RUS)	77.46	75.78	80.30	80.30 m
6	14	Terry McHugh (IRL)	72.88	71.22	77.90	77.90 m
7	16	Vladimir Sasimovich (BLR)	75.24	76.28	77.38	77.38 m
8	17	Seppo Räty (FIN)	77.24	76.82	75.82	77.24 m
9	19	Andreas Linden (GER)	75.66	75.90	X	75.90 m
10	21	Gavin Lovegrove (NZL)	75.62	X	X	75.62 m
11	23	Rajmund Kółko (POL)	74.76	74.98	72.16	74.98 m
12	25	Dimitrios Polymerou (GRE)	74.94	X	X	74.94 m
13	27	Sergey Voynov (UZB)	74.32	70.16	73.28	74.32 m
14	30	Juan de la Garza (MEX)	71.98	X	66.88	71.98 m
15	31	Chu Ki-Young (KOR)	70.84	69.58	70.42	70.84 m
16	32	Bouna Diop (SEN)	X	65.06	69.66	69.66 m
17	34	Pius Bazighe (NGR)	69.64	65.14	68.92	69.64 m
18	35	Ed Kaminski (USA)	68.04	X	69.42	69.42 m
19	36	Adrian Hatcher (AUS)	X	X	69.18	69.18 m
20	38	Rigoberto Calderón (NCA)	67.92	X	66.46	67.92 m

== Final ==
Rank	Athlete	Attempts						Distance
Rank	Athlete	1	2	3	4	5	6	Distance
1st place, gold medalist(s)	Marius Corbett (RSA)	76.58	88.40	87.40	83.84	84.54	82.42	88.40 m
2nd place, silver medalist(s)	Steve Backley (GBR)	82.94	84.74	X	X	83.20	86.80	86.80 m
3rd place, bronze medalist(s)	Kostas Gatsioudis (GRE)	81.70	86.64	83.98	X	X	X	86.64 m
4	Mick Hill (GBR)	84.48	86.54	X	83.64	X	83.04	86.54 m
5	Sergey Makarov (RUS)	84.56	86.32	84.70	81.94	83.16	84.48	86.32 m
6	Boris Henry (GER)	84.54	78.50	82.90	82.48	83.46	84.42	84.54 m
7	Emeterio González (CUB)	82.08	82.22	83.56	79.20	X	79.72	83.56 m
8	Aki Parviainen (FIN)	75.18	82.80	X	X	X	X	82.80 m
9	Jan Železný (CZE)	X	X	82.04				82.04 m
10	Gregor Högler (AUT)	81.00	80.18	81.56				81.56 m
11	Andrey Moruyev (RUS)	81.26	81.38	78.00				81.38 m
12	Patrik Bodén (SWE)	78.68	76.14	80.66				80.66 m

== See also ==
- 1992 Men's Olympic Javelin Throw (Barcelona)
- 1994 Men's European Championships Javelin Throw (Helsinki)
- 1996 Men's Olympic Javelin Throw (Atlanta)
- 1998 Men's European Championships Javelin Throw (Budapest)
- 2000 Men's Olympic Javelin Throw (Sydney)
