= 1999 World Championships in Athletics – Men's javelin throw =

These are the official results of the Men's Javelin Throw event at the 1999 World Championships in Seville, Spain. There were a total number of 40 participating athletes, with the final held on Sunday 29 August 1999.

== Medalists ==
Gold	Aki Parviainen; Finland (FIN)
Silver	Kostas Gatsioudis; Greece (GRE)
Bronze	Jan Železný; Czech Republic (CZE)

== Schedule ==
- All times are Central European Time (UTC+1)

Qualification Round
Group A	Group B
27.08.1999 – 18:45h	27.08.1999 – 20:40h
Final Round
29.08.1999 – 18:55h

== Abbreviations ==
- All results shown are in metres

Q	automatic qualification
q	qualification by rank
DNS	did not start
NM	no mark
WR	world record
AR	area record
NR	national record
PB	personal best
SB	season best

== Startlist ==
Order	№	Athlete	Season Best	Personal Best
GROUP A
1	432	Harri Haatainen (FIN)	83.02	83.02
2	1358	Patrik Bodén (SWE)	84.52	89.10
3	131	Vladimir Sasimovich (BLR)	81.64	87.40
4	1162	Dariusz Trafas (POL)	83.23	83.23
5	515	Steve Backley (GBR)	87.59	91.46
6	1499	Tom Pukstys (USA)	84.11	87.12
7	594	Raymond Hecht (GER)	88.67	92.60
8	1533	Sergey Voynov (UZB)	80.00	81.80
9	1205	Marius Corbett (RSA)	87.17	88.75
10	926	Ēriks Rags (LAT)	83.78	83.78
11	323	Jan Železný (CZE)	89.06	98.48
12	904	Ali Saleh Al-Jadani (KSA)	77.80	77.80
13	443	Aki Parviainen (FIN)	93.09	93.09
14	736	Terry McHugh (IRL)	76.85	82.14
15	52	Andrew Currey (AUS)	83.88	85.75
GROUP B
1	290	Emeterio González (CUB)	82.76	84.20
2	1243	Sergey Makarov (RUS)	89.93	89.93
3	644	Kostas Gatsioudis (GRE)	89.57	89.57
4	1099	Pål Arne Fagernes (NOR)	86.00	86.00
5	70	Gregor Högler (AUT)	84.03	84.03
6	893	Yu Nam-Sung (KOR)	75.44	79.84
7	572	Peter Blank (GER)	87.11	88.12
8	548	Nick Nieland (GBR)	83.68	83.68
9	237	Li Rongxiang (CHN)	82.72	82.72
10	1125	Nery Kennedy (PAR)	78.89	81.28
11	441	Matti Närhi (FIN)	87.88	88.24
12	596	Boris Henry (GER)	88.62	90.44
13	538	Mick Hill (GBR)	84.94	86.94
14	948	Arūnas Jurkšas (LTU)	79.29	79.29
15	98	Johan Kloeck (BEL)	83.65	83.65

== Records ==
Standing records prior to the 1999 World Athletics Championships
World Record	Jan Železný (CZE)	98.48 m	May 25, 1996	Jena, Germany
Event Record	Jan Železný (CZE)	89.58 m	August 13, 1995	Gothenburg, Sweden
Season Best	Aki Parviainen (FIN)	93.09 m	June 26, 1999	Kuortane, Finland

== Qualification ==
=== Group A ===
Rank	Overall	Athlete	Attempts			Distance	Note
Rank	Overall	Athlete	1	2	3	Distance	Note
1	3	Jan Železný (CZE)	84.31	—	—	84.31 m	
2	4	Raymond Hecht (GER)	81.54	83.41	—	83.41 m	
3	7	Aki Parviainen (FIN)	81.25	82.84	X	82.84 m	
4	9	Harri Haatainen (FIN)	78.40	81.83	79.44	81.83 m	
5	11	Steve Backley (GBR)	X	81.68	X	81.68 m	
6	12	Ēriks Rags (LAT)	81.61	X	77.06	81.61 m	
7	15	Vladimir Sasimovich (BLR)	80.18	79.44	76.34	80.18 m	
8	18	Dariusz Trafas (POL)	78.43	74.19	76.05	78.43 m	
9	19	Sergey Voynov (UZB)	X	75.79	77.35	77.35 m	
10	20	Terry McHugh (IRL)	X	73.09	77.23	77.23 m	SB
11	21	Andrew Currey (AUS)	70.92	76.34	75.37	76.34 m	
12	22	Marius Corbett (RSA)	X	73.28	76.34	76.34 m	
13	24	Patrik Bodén (SWE)	72.26	73.61	75.66	75.66 m	
14	27	Ali Saleh Al-Jadani (KSA)	X	69.86	72.19	72.19 m	
—	—	Tom Pukstys (USA)	—	—	—	DNS	

=== Group B ===
Rank	Overall	Athlete	Attempts			Distance	Note
Rank	Overall	Athlete	1	2	3	Distance	Note
1	1	Kostas Gatsioudis (GRE)	87.97	—	—	87.97 m	
2	2	Matti Närhi (FIN)	X	78.79	85.05	85.05 m	
3	5	Boris Henry (GER)	80.27	80.82	83.35	83.35 m	
4	6	Emeterio González (CUB)	82.86	81.48	82.74	82.86 m	SB
5	8	Sergey Makarov (RUS)	78.79	82.25	X	82.25 m	
6	10	Pål Arne Fagernes (NOR)	X	80.23	81.74	81.74 m	
7	13	Peter Blank (GER)	80.89	X	74.37	80.89 m	
8	14	Mick Hill (GBR)	80.75	X	79.61	80.75 m	
9	16	Arūnas Jurkšas (LTU)	79.56	74.35	70.85	79.56 m	NR
10	17	Li Rongxiang (CHN)	78.09	79.24	78.63	79.24 m	
11	23	Gregor Högler (AUT)	75.94	73.55	74.30	75.94 m	
12	25	Johan Kloeck (BEL)	72.60	74.87	69.83	74.87 m	
13	26	Yu Nam-Sung (KOR)	72.87	X	65.41	72.87 m	
14	28	Nick Nieland (GBR)	72.12	X	X	72.12 m	
15	29	Nery Kennedy (PAR)	70.88	68.25	71.74	71.74 m	

== Final ==
Rank	Athlete	Attempts						Distance	Note
Rank	Athlete	1	2	3	4	5	6	Distance	Note
1st place, gold medalist(s)	Aki Parviainen (FIN)	81.63	86.08	83.78	85.00	89.52	—	89.52 m	
2nd place, silver medalist(s)	Kostas Gatsioudis (GRE)	89.18	83.35	81.72	81.68	X	87.16	89.18 m	
3rd place, bronze medalist(s)	Jan Železný (CZE)	83.60	87.67	X	X	X	—	87.67 m	
4	Pål Arne Fagernes (NOR)	82.99	86.24	78.98	81.74	X	X	86.24 m	NR
5	Raymond Hecht (GER)	85.92	85.24	X	79.23	79.01	81.38	85.92 m	
6	Boris Henry (GER)	83.28	83.38	83.67	82.98	85.43	X	85.43 m	
7	Emeterio González (CUB)	76.41	83.00	84.32	78.37	81.97	78.55	84.32 m	NR
8	Steve Backley (GBR)	83.84	82.60	81.20	X	X	X	83.84 m	
9	Sergey Makarov (RUS)	77.24	77.50	83.20				83.20 m	
10	Ēriks Rags (LAT)	X	81.64	77.04				81.64 m	
11	Harri Haatainen (FIN)	80.92	X	77.97				80.92 m	
12	Matti Närhi (FIN)	79.47	76.98	X				79.47 m	

== See also ==
- 1996 Men's Olympic Javelin Throw (Atlanta)
- 1998 Men's European Championships Javelin Throw (Budapest)
- 2000 Men's Olympic Javelin Throw (Sydney)
- 2002 Men's European Championships Javelin Throw (Munich)
