= Jan Železný =

Czech javelin thrower (born 1966)

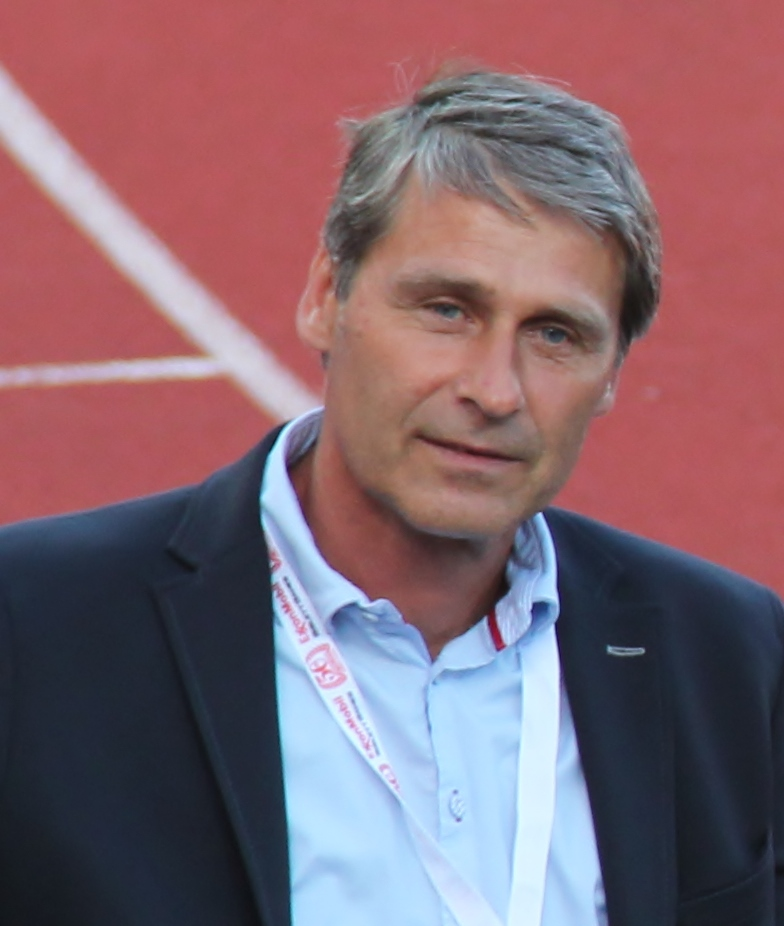
- Železný in 2015

Personal information
- Nationality: Czech
- Born: 16 June 1966 (age 60) Mladá Boleslav, Czechoslovakia
- Height: 1.85 m (6 ft 1 in)
- Weight: 86 kg (190 lb; 13.5 st)

Sport
- Country: Czechoslovakia (1987–1992); Czech Republic (1993–2006)
- Sport: Track and field
- Event: Javelin throw
- Turned pro: 1986
- Retired: 2006

Achievements and titles
- Personal bests: WR 98.48 m (1996)
Medal record
Men's athletics
Event	1st	2nd	3rd
Olympic Games	3	1	0
World Championships	3	0	2
European Championships	0	0	2
Total	6	1	4
Representing Czechoslovakia
Olympic Games
Gold medal – first place	1992 Barcelona	Javelin
Silver medal – second place	1988 Seoul	Javelin
World Championships
Bronze medal – third place	1987 Rome	Javelin
Representing Czech Republic
Olympic Games
Gold medal – first place	1996 Atlanta	Javelin
Gold medal – first place	2000 Sydney	Javelin
World Championships
Gold medal – first place	1993 Stuttgart	Javelin
Gold medal – first place	1995 Gothenburg	Javelin
Gold medal – first place	2001 Edmonton	Javelin
Bronze medal – third place	1999 Seville	Javelin
Goodwill Games
Gold medal – first place	2001 Brisbane	Javelin throw
European Championships
Bronze medal – third place	1994 Helsinki	Javelin
Bronze medal – third place	2006 Gothenburg	Javelin
- Updated on 6 July 2012

Jan Železný (Czech pronunciation: [jan ˈʒɛlɛzniː]; born 16 June 1966) is a Czech former track and field athlete who competed in the javelin throw. He is a World and Olympic champion and holds the world record with a throw of 98.48 metres (323 ft 1 in). Widely considered the greatest javelin thrower of the modern era, he also has the fourth, fifth, and sixth best performances of all time. He broke the world record a total of four times.

== Biography ==
Železný was born in Mladá Boleslav, Czechoslovakia. He won the silver medal in the 1988 Olympics and the gold medal at the 1992, 1996 and 2000 Summer Olympic Games. He won World Championship titles in 1993, 1995 and 2001.

Železný holds the world record of 98.48 metres (323 ft 1 in), set in 1996, and the World Championships record of 92.80 metres (304 ft 6 in), set in 2001. On 26 March 1997, in Stellenbosch, South Africa, he threw over the 90-metre barrier five times in a single meet. Until September 2020, he was also the only athlete to throw more than 95 metres with the new type of javelin, something he achieved three times.

During his career, Železný had many great battles against the likes of Steve Backley, Sergey Makarov, Boris Henry, Seppo Räty, Raymond Hecht and Aki Parviainen.

Železný planned to retire after the 2006 European Championships in Gothenburg, where he won the bronze medal with a throw of 85.92 metres (281 ft 11 in). He took leave of his career on 19 September 2006 on exhibition in Mladá Boleslav, the place where he started with athletics.

Železný coaches Vítězslav Veselý and is the former coach of Barbora Špotáková.

Four days after winning a gold medal at the 1996 Olympics, Železný had a tryout as a baseball pitcher with the Atlanta Braves at Fulton County Stadium. Both Železný and the Braves treated the tryout seriously and not as a "publicity stunt" or "sideshow", though Železný had no baseball experience beyond throwing a ball at home with his young son.

== International competitions ==
Year	Competition	Venue	Position	Event	Notes
Representing Czechoslovakia
1983	European Junior Championships	Schwechat, Austria	6th	Javelin (old)	71.26 m
1985	European Junior Championships	Cottbus, East Germany	4th	Javelin (old)	75.10 m
1986	European Championships	Stuttgart, West Germany	18th (q)	Javelin	75.90 m
1987	World Championships	Rome, Italy	3rd	Javelin	82.20 m
1988	Olympic Games	Seoul, South Korea	2nd	Javelin	84.12 m
1990	European Championships	Split, Yugoslavia	13th (q)	Javelin	77.64 m
1991	World Championships	Tokyo, Japan	18th (q)	Javelin	76.26 m
1992	Olympic Games	Barcelona, Spain	1st	Javelin	89.66 m
Representing the Czech Republic
1993	World Championships	Stuttgart, Germany	1st	Javelin	85.98 m
1994	European Championships	Helsinki, Finland	3rd	Javelin	82.58 m
1995	World Championships	Gothenburg, Sweden	1st	Javelin	89.58 m
1996	Olympic Games	Atlanta, United States	1st	Javelin	88.16 m
1997	World Championships	Athens, Greece	9th	Javelin	82.04 m
1999	World Championships	Seville, Spain	3rd	Javelin	87.67 m
2000	Olympic Games	Sydney, Australia	1st	Javelin	90.17 m
2001	World Championships	Edmonton, Canada	1st	Javelin	92.80 m
2001	Goodwill Games	Brisbane, Australia	1st	Javelin	87.52 m
2002	European Championships	Munich, Germany	11th	Javelin	NM
2003	World Championships	Paris, France	4th	Javelin	84.09 m
2004	Olympic Games	Athens, Greece	9th	Javelin	80.59 m
2006	European Championships	Gothenburg, Sweden	3rd	Javelin	85.92 m

== See also ==
- List of multiple Olympic gold medalists in one event
- List of European records in athletics

Records
Preceded by Steve Backley	Men's javelin world record holder 6 April 1993 – present	Succeeded by Incumbent
Awards and achievements
Preceded by Robert Změlík; Dominik Hašek; Tomáš Dvořák	Czech Athlete of the Year; 1993; 1995; 2000, 2001	Succeeded by Dominik Hašek; Martin Doktor; Aleš Valenta
Preceded by Jonathan Edwards; Tomáš Dvořák	Men's European Athlete of the Year; 1996; 2000	Succeeded by Wilson Kipketer; André Bucher
Preceded by Michael Johnson	IAAF World Athlete of the Year; 2000	Succeeded by Hicham El Guerrouj
