= Masters M45 javelin throw world record progression =

Masters M45 javelin throw world record progression is the progression of world record improvements of the javelin throw M45 division of Masters athletics. Records must be set in properly conducted, official competitions under the standing IAAF rules unless modified by World Masters Athletics. The M45 division consists of male athletes who have reached the age of 45 but have not yet reached the age of 50, so exactly from their 45th birthday to the day before their 50th birthday. The M45 division throws an 800 g implement.

Key

Incomplete information Pending

Distance	Athlete	Nationality	Birthdate	Location	Date
77.15	Peter Blank	Germany	10.04.1962	Rehlingen	28.05.2007
73.02	Larry Stuart	United States	19.10.1937	Northridge	14.06.1986
66.26	Axel Jelten	Germany	06.12.1940	Heidelberg	25.05.1986
