= Athletics at the 2000 Summer Olympics – Men's javelin throw =

Men's Javelin throw at the Games of the XXVII Olympiad
- Pictogram for Athletics
- Dates: 22 September (qualification); 23 September (final)
- Competitors: 36 from 26 nations
- Winning distance: 90.17 OR

Medalists
1st place, gold medalist(s)		Jan Železný; Czech Republic
2nd place, silver medalist(s)		Steve Backley; Great Britain
3rd place, bronze medalist(s)		Sergey Makarov; Russia

The Men's Javelin Throw at the 2000 Summer Olympics as part of the athletics program was held at the Olympic Stadium on Friday, 22 September and Saturday, 23 September.

The qualifying athletes progressed through to the final where the qualifying distances are scrapped and they start afresh with up to six throws. The qualifying distance was 83.00 metres. For all qualifiers who did not achieve the standard, the remaining spaces in the final were filled by the longest throws until a total of 12 qualifiers.

== Medalists ==
Gold	Jan Železný; Czech Republic
Silver	Steve Backley; Great Britain
Bronze	Sergey Makarov; Russia

== Schedule ==
- All times are Australian Eastern Standard Time (UTC+10)

Qualification Round
Group A	Group B
22.09.2000 – 11:30h	22.09.2000 – 13:25h
Final Round
23.09.2000 – 20:30h

== Abbreviations ==
Q	automatic qualification
q	qualification by rank
DNS	did not start
NM	no mark
OR	olympic record
WR	world record
AR	area record
NR	national record
PB	personal best
SB	season best

== Records ==
Standing records prior to the 2000 Summer Olympics
World Record	Jan Železný (CZE)	98.48 m	25 May 1996	Jena, Germany
Olympic Record	Jan Železný (TCH)	89.66 m	8 August 1992	Barcelona, Spain
Broken records during the 2000 Summer Olympics
Olympic Record	Jan Železný (CZE)	90.17 m	23 September 2000	Sydney, Australia

== Qualification ==
=== Group A ===
Rank	Overall	Athlete	Attempts			Distance	Note
Rank	Overall	Athlete	1	2	3	Distance	Note
1	2	Konstadinos Gatsioudis (GRE)	88.41	—	—	88.41 m	
2	3	Pål Arne Fagernes (NOR)	X	81.49	86.74	86.74 m	NR
3	4	Sergey Makarov (RUS)	85.60	—	—	85.60 m	
4	6	Raymond Hecht (GER)	81.12	81.93	84.00	84.00 m	SB
5	7	Dariusz Trafas (POL)	76.58	83.98	—	83.98 m	PB
6	10	Emeterio González (CUB)	78.70	82.64	77.72	82.64 m	
7	13	Nick Nieland (GBR)	72.32	82.12	X	82.12 m	
8	15	Andrus Värnik (EST)	67.76	74.16	81.34	81.34 m	
9	16	Andrew Martin (AUS)	78.65	X	81.31	81.31 m	
10	17	Gregor Högler (AUT)	80.89	76.57	80.05	80.89 m	
11	18	Voldemārs Lūsis (LAT)	80.08	X	X	80.08 m	
12	19	Harri Haatainen (FIN)	79.93	X	78.46	79.93 m	
13	20	Terry McHugh (IRL)	79.90	77.33	79.40	79.90 m	
14	21	Adrian Hatcher (AUS)	77.58	79.23	X	79.23 m	
15	30	Jagdish Bishnoi (IND)	70.86	69.77	X	70.86 m	
16	31	Song Dong-hyeon (KOR)	68.85	70.48	67.98	70.48 m	
17	34	Ali Saleh Al-Jadani (KSA)	X	X	68.70	68.70 m	
—	—	Harri Hakkarainen (FIN)	—	—	—	NM (Note: Hakkarainen broke his Achilles tendon in his first attempt and was unable to continue.)	

=== Group B ===
Rank	Overall	Athlete	Attempts			Distance	Note
Rank	Overall	Athlete	1	2	3	Distance	Note
1	1	Jan Železný (CZE)	89.39	—	—	89.39 m	
2	5	Boris Henry (GER)	84.58	—	—	84.58 m	
3	8	Steve Backley (GBR)	83.74	—	—	83.74 m	
4	9	Aki Parviainen (FIN)	80.61	76.83	83.73	83.73 m	
5	11	Breaux Greer (USA)	82.63	80.32	77.61	82.63 m	PB
6	12	Michael Hill (GBR)	78.55	82.24	X	82.24 m	
7	14	Vladimir Ovchinnikov (RUS)	77.82	X	82.10	82.10 m	
8	22	Andrew Currey (AUS)	78.12	76.38	75.47	78.12 m	
9	23	Patrik Bodén (SWE)	78.06	76.56	74.07	78.06 m	
10	24	Vladimir Sasimovich (BLR)	74.64	X	78.04	78.04 m	
11	25	Sergey Voynov (UZB)	X	75.89	74.98	75.89 m	
12	26	Ēriks Rags (LAT)	X	75.75	X	75.75 m	
13	27	Marián Bokor (SVK)	71.03	75.49	X	75.49 m	
14	28	Isbel Luaces (CUB)	75.17	X	74.25	75.17 m	
15	29	Arūnas Jurkšas (LTU)	71.36	73.05	X	73.05 m	
16	32	Maher Ridane (TUN)	X	66.97	70.35	70.35 m	
17	33	Nery Kennedy (PAR)	66.05	69.17	70.26	70.26 m	
18	35	Dmitry Shnayder (KGZ)	X	65.00	66.40	66.40 m	

=== Final ranking ===
Rank	Athlete	Distance	Group	Note
1	Jan Železný (CZE)	89.39 m	B	
2	Kostas Gatsioudis (GRE)	88.41 m	A	
3	Pål Arne Fagernes (NOR)	86.74 m	A	NR
4	Sergey Makarov (RUS)	85.60 m	A	
5	Boris Henry (GER)	84.58 m	B	
6	Raymond Hecht (GER)	84.00 m	A	SB
7	Dariusz Trafas (POL)	83.98 m	A	PB
8	Steve Backley (GBR)	83.74 m	B	
9	Aki Parviainen (FIN)	83.73 m	B	
10	Emeterio González (CUB)	82.64 m	A	
11	Breaux Greer (USA)	82.63 m	B	PB
12	Michael Hill (GBR)	82.24 m	B	
13	Nick Nieland (GBR)	82.12 m	A	
14	Vladimir Ovchinnikov (RUS)	82.10 m	B	
15	Andrus Värnik (EST)	81.34 m	A	
16	Andrew Martin (AUS)	81.31 m	A	
17	Gregor Högler (AUT)	80.89 m	A	
18	Voldemārs Lūsis (LAT)	80.08 m	A	
19	Harri Haatainen (FIN)	79.93 m	A	
20	Terry McHugh (IRL)	79.90 m	A	
21	Adrian Hatcher (AUS)	79.23 m	A	
22	Andrew Currey (AUS)	78.12 m	B	
23	Patrik Bodén (SWE)	78.06 m	B	
24	Vladimir Sasimovich (BLR)	78.04 m	B	
25	Sergey Voynov (UZB)	75.89 m	B	
26	Ēriks Rags (LAT)	75.75 m	B	
27	Marián Bokor (SVK)	75.49 m	B	
28	Isbel Luaces (CUB)	75.17 m	B	
29	Arūnas Jurkšas (LTU)	73.05 m	B	
30	Jagdish Bishnoi (IND)	70.86 m	A	
31	Song Dong-Hyeon (KOR)	70.48 m	A	
32	Maher Ridane (TUN)	70.35 m	B	
33	Nery Kennedy (PAR)	70.26 m	B	
34	Ali Saleh Al-Jadani (KSA)	68.70 m	A	
35	Dmitry Shnayder (KGZ)	66.40 m	B	
—	Harri Hakkarainen (FIN)	NM	A	

=== Final ===
Rank	Athlete	Attempts						Distance	Note
Rank	Athlete	1	2	3	4	5	6	Distance	Note
1st place, gold medalist(s)	Jan Železný (CZE)	89.41	X	90.17	X	X	88.97	90.17 m	OR
2nd place, silver medalist(s)	Steve Backley (GBR)	86.25	89.85	X	80.99	X	X	89.85 m	SB
3rd place, bronze medalist(s)	Sergey Makarov (RUS)	88.67	85.90	X	X	86.67	85.30	88.67 m	
4	Raymond Hecht (GER)	87.76	X	X	X	76.11	—	87.76 m	SB
5	Aki Parviainen (FIN)	86.62	82.49	84.01	X	X	78.42	86.62 m	
6	Konstadinos Gatsioudis (GRE)	85.06	X	83.73	83.53	86.53	83.32	86.53 m	
7	Boris Henry (GER)	82.94	80.78	83.45	X	85.78	83.31	85.78 m	
8	Emeterio González (CUB)	76.13	78.55	83.33	X	X	77.19	83.33 m	
9	Pål Arne Fagernes (NOR)	80.06	83.04	72.01				83.04 m	
10	Dariusz Trafas (POL)	75.11	82.30	82.01				82.30 m	
11	Michael Hill (GBR)	81.00	80.92	X				81.00 m	
12	Breaux Greer (USA)	74.16	X	79.91				79.91 m	

== See also ==
- 1997 Men's World Championships Javelin Throw (Athens)
- 1998 Men's European Championships Javelin Throw (Budapest)
- 1999 Men's World Championships Javelin Throw (Seville)
- 2000 Javelin Throw Year Ranking
- 2001 Men's World Championships Javelin Throw (Edmonton)
- 2002 Men's European Championships Javelin Throw (Munich)
- 2003 Men's World Championships Javelin Throw (Paris)
