= Nery Kennedy =

Paraguayan javelin thrower

Personal information
- Born: May 28, 1973 (age 53)
- Height: 1.86 m (6 ft 1 in)
- Weight: 95 kg (209 lb)

Sport
- Sport: Javelin throw
Medal record
Representing Paraguay
South American Games
Gold medal – first place	1994 Valencia	Javelin throw
Gold medal – first place	1998 Cuenca	Javelin throw

Nery Gustavo Kennedy Rolón (born May 28, 1973) is a javelin thrower from Paraguay, who represented his native country at two Summer Olympics (1992 and 2000). He briefly held the South American record for the Javelin Throw with a result of 81.28m, thrown on 9 May 1998, overtaking compatriot Edgar Baumann at the time. The mark stood until 1999, when compatriot Baumann threw 84.70 metres. In 2008, he worked as a coach in Canada with Frédérick Bouchard. He achieved the Texas A&M Javelin Throw record in 1994. Kennedy was coached by Juan De La Garza at Texas A&M in 1996.

== Achievements ==
=== International competitions ===
Year	Competition	Venue	Position	Event	Notes
Representing Paraguay
1991	South American Junior Championships	Asunción, Paraguay	1st	Javelin	64.28 m
1992	Ibero-American Championships	Seville, Spain	9th	Javelin	64.28 m
1992	Olympic Games	Barcelona, Spain	30th (q)	Javelin	65.00 m
1992	World Junior Championships	Seoul, South Korea	20th (q)	Javelin	62.24 m
1994	South American Games	Valencia, Venezuela	1st	Javelin	76.70 m
1995	Pan American Games	Mar del Plata, Argentina	9th	Javelin	64.02 m
1997	South American Championships	Mar del Plata, Argentina	1st	Javelin	75.08 m
1998	Ibero-American Championships	Lisbon, Portugal	2nd	Javelin	76.16 m
1998	South American Games	Cuenca, Ecuador	1st	Javelin	71.70 m A
1999	South American Championships	Bogotá, Colombia	1st	Javelin	78.89 m
1999	Pan American Games	Winnipeg, Canada	4th	Javelin	75.16 m
1999	World Championships	Seville, Spain	29th (q)	Javelin	71.74 m
2000	Ibero-American Championships	Rio de Janeiro, Brazil	2nd	Javelin	75.60 m
2000	Olympic Games	Sydney, Australia	33rd (q)	Javelin	70.26 m
2001	South American Championships	Manaus, Brazil	2nd	Javelin	74.41 m
2003	Pan American Games	Santo Domingo, Dominican Republic	6th	Javelin	72.62 m
2003	World Championships	Paris, France	21st (q)	Javelin	68.83 m
2003	South American Championships	Barquisimeto, Venezuela	3rd	Javelin	75.53 m

=== National competitions ===
Year	Competition	Venue	Position	Event	Notes
1995	NCAA Division 1 Outdoor Championships	Knoxville, United States of America	9th	Javelin	69.66m
2003	FPA Open Tournament	Asunción, Paraguay	1st	Javelin	75.30m
2008	2008 Provincial Summer Athletics Championship	Montréal, Canada	1st	Javelin	62.41m
2008	Canadian Track and Field Championships	Windsor, Canada	4th	Javelin	N/A

== Personal best ==
- Javelin Throw: 81.28m (United States) College Station, Texas – 9 May 1998

== Seasonal bests ==
According to IAAF Profile.

- 1992 – 65.00
- 1994 – 76.70
- 1996 – 74.12
- 1997 – 75.08
- 1998 – 81.28
- 1999 – 78.89
- 2000 – 77.74
- 2001 – 76.04
- 2002 – 74.89
- 2003 – 75.53
- 2004 – 72.23
- 2005 – 70.03
- 2007 – 71.79
- 2008 – 76.66
- 2010 – 68.89
- 2011 – 61.50
- 2012 – 65.69

Olympic Games
Preceded by Ramón Jiménez-Gaona	Flagbearer for Paraguay; Sydney 2000	Succeeded by Rocio Rivarola
