= Uladzimir Sasimovich =

Belarusian javelin thrower

Vladimir Nikolayevich Sasimovich (Belarusian: Уладзімір Мікалаевіч Сасімовіч, Russian: Владимир Николаевич Сасимович; born 14 September 1968) is a retired javelin thrower who represented the USSR and later Belarus.

His personal best was 87.40 metres, achieved in June 1995 in Kuortane. He was suspended by the IAAF from August 2004 to August 2006.

== Seasonal bests by year ==
- 1986 - 78.84
- 1991 - 87.08
- 1992 - 78.40
- 1993 - 84.28
- 1994 - 83.14
- 1995 - 87.40
- 1997 - 77.84
- 1998 - 79.68
- 1999 - 81.64
- 2000 - 84.42
- 2001 - 76.68
- 2003 - 79.57
- 2004 - 78.55

== Achievements ==
Year	Competition	Venue	Position	Notes
Representing the Soviet Union
1986	World Junior Championships	Athens, Greece	1st	78.84 m = PB
1987	European Junior Championships	Birmingham, England	2nd	73.24 m
1991	World Championships	Tokyo, Japan	3rd	87.08 m = PB
Representing Unified Team
1992	World Cup	Havana, Cuba	3rd	78.40 m
Representing Belarus
1993	World Championships	Stuttgart, Germany	7th	78.70 m
1994	European Championships	Helsinki, Finland	8th	78.88 m
1995	World Championships	Gothenburg, Sweden	13th	78.94 m
1996	Olympic Games	Atlanta, Georgia, United States	—	NM
1997	World Championships	Athens, Greece	16th	77.38 m
1998	European Championships	Budapest, Hungary	13th	79.14 m
1999	World Championships	Seville, Spain	15th	80.18 m
2000	Olympic Games	Sydney, Australia	24th	78.04 m

== See also ==
- List of sportspeople sanctioned for doping offences
