= Andrew Martin (javelin thrower) =

Australian javelin thrower

Personal information
- Nationality: Australian
- Born: 12 May 1980 (age 45) Melbourne, Australia

Sport
- Sport: Athletics
- Event: Javelin throw

Andrew Martin (born 12 May 1980) is an Australian athlete. He competed in the men's javelin throw at the 2000 Summer Olympics.
