= 2002 European Athletics Championships – Men's javelin throw =

Men's javelin throw at the European Athletics Championships

These are the official results of the Men's javelin throw event at the 2002 European Championships in Munich, Germany. There were a total number of 21 participating athletes. The final was held on Friday August 9, 2002, and the qualifying round on Wednesday August 7, 2002 with the mark set at 82.00 metres.

== Medalists ==
Gold	(United Kingdom) Steve Backley; Great Britain (GBR)
Silver	Sergey Makarov; Russia (RUS)
Bronze	Boris Henry; Germany (GER)

== Schedule ==
- All times are Central European Time (UTC+1)

Qualification Round
Group A	Group B
07.08.2002 – 09:00	07.08.2002 – 10:20
Final Round
09.08.2002 – 19:45

== Abbreviations ==
- All results shown are in metres

Q	automatic qualification
q	qualification by rank
DNS	did not start
NM	no mark
WR	world record
AR	area record
NR	national record
PB	personal best
SB	season best

== Records ==
Standing records prior to the 2002 European Athletics Championships
World Record	Jan Železný (CZE)	98.48 m	May 25, 1996	Jena, Germany
Event Record	Steve Backley (GBR)	89.72 m	August 23, 1998	Budapest, Hungary

== Qualification ==
=== Group A ===
Rank	Overall	Athlete	Attempts			Distance
Rank	Overall	Athlete	1	2	3	Distance
1	1	Steve Backley (GBR)	85.76	—	—	85.76 m
2	3	Sergey Makarov (RUS)	81.39	83.24	—	83.24 m
3	5	Jan Železný (CZE)	78.97	82.44	—	82.44 m
4	6	Boris Henry (GER)	82.31	—	—	82.31 m
5	9	Dariusz Trafas (POL)	79.84	79.67	80.28	80.28 m
6	10	Mick Hill (GBR)	75.13	79.38	X	79.38 m
7	11	Harri Haatainen (FIN)	71.77	78.04	79.25	79.25 m
8	12	Ari Pakarinen (FIN)	70.07	73.77	79.04	79.04 m
9	16	Vadims Vasiļevskis (LAT)	78.20	X	73.34	78.20 m
10	18	Gergely Horváth (HUN)	77.04	77.93	76.71	77.93 m
11	19	Vadim Bavikin (ISR)	77.73	75.73	74.99	77.73 m
12	22	Felix Loretz (SUI)	72.19	73.29	71.34	73.29 m
13	23	Richard Knudsen (DEN)	73.27	X	64.29	73.27 m

=== Group B ===
Rank	Overall	Athlete	Attempts			Distance
Rank	Overall	Athlete	1	2	3	Distance
1	2	Ēriks Rags (LAT)	76.55	84.05	—	84.05 m
2	4	Aleksandr Ivanov (RUS)	77.94	77.77	82.60	82.60 m
3	7	Raymond Hecht (GER)	81.86	81.85	—	81.86 m
4	8	Aki Parviainen (FIN)	X	81.49	—	81.49 m
5	13	Björn Lange (GER)	78.80	X	78.75	78.80 m
6	14	Gregor Hogler (AUT)	78.40	X	78.75	78.40 m
7	15	Andreas Thorkildsen (NOR)	75.18	78.36	X	78.36 m
8	17	Rajmund Kółko (POL)	78.05	X	74.94	78.05 m
9	20	Miroslav Guzdek (CZE)	69.99	75.84	71.55	75.84 m
10	21	Andrus Värnik (EST)	X	X	75.66	75.66 m
11	24	Joachim Kiteau (FRA)	64.56	72.29	X	72.29 m
12	25	Nick Nieland (GBR)	X	71.92	X	71.92 m
—	—	Terry McHugh (IRL)	X	—	—	NM

== Final ==
Rank	Athlete	Attempts						Distance	Note
Rank	Athlete	1	2	3	4	5	6	Distance	Note
1st place, gold medalist(s)	Steve Backley (GBR)	86.29	83.94	86.37	84.05	88.54	84.76	88.54 m	
2nd place, silver medalist(s)	Sergey Makarov (RUS)	88.05	85.78	85.76	X	86.31	X	88.05 m	
3rd place, bronze medalist(s)	Boris Henry (GER)	85.23	85.10	83.71	X	85.33	80.99	85.33 m	
4	Ēriks Rags (LAT)	84.07	X	X	82.43	X	83.95	84.07 m	
5	Raymond Hecht (GER)	83.95	83.57	X	X	83.30	80.49	83.95 m	
6	Aleksandr Ivanov (RUS)	77.76	82.17	82.66	82.26	80.69	82.57	82.66 m	
7	Dariusz Trafas (POL)	79.51	X	77.86	80.37	X	80.09	80.37 m	
8	Aki Parviainen (FIN)	78.91	X	X	74.57	X	78.92	78.92 m	
9	Harri Haatainen (FIN)	X	X	78.27				78.27 m	
10	Mick Hill (GBR)	76.12	X	X				76.12 m	
—	Jan Železný (CZE)	X	X	X				NM	
—	Ari Pakarinen (FIN)	X	—	—				DNF	

== See also ==
- 1999 Men's World Championships Javelin Throw (Seville)
- 2000 Men's Olympic Javelin Throw (Sydney)
- 2001 Men's World Championships Javelin Throw (Edmonton)
- 2003 Men's World Championships Javelin Throw (Paris)
- 2004 Men's Olympic Javelin Throw (Athens)
- 2005 Men's World Championships Javelin Throw (Helsinki)
