= Voldemārs Lūsis =

Latvian javelin thrower

Voldemārs Lūsis (born 7 December 1974 in Riga) is a former Latvian athlete, who competed in the javelin throw. He is the son of Jānis Lūsis (1939–2020) and Elvīra Ozoliņa. Lūsis finished in eleventh place in 2001 World Championships. He competed at the 2000 and 2004 Summer Olympics without reaching the final. During his career he was coached by Valentīna Eiduka.

== Achievements ==
Year	Competition	Venue	Position	Notes
1998	European Championships	Budapest, Hungary	20th	75.14 m
2000	Olympic Games	Sydney, Australia	18th	80.08 m
2001	World Championships	Edmonton, Canada	11th	79.70 m
2003	World Championships	Paris, France	19th	75.15 m
2004	Olympic Games	Athens, Greece	17th	79.27 m

== Seasonal bests by year ==
- 1998 - 79.60
- 1999 - 81.48
- 2000 - 83.08
- 2001 - 81.86
- 2002 - 81.58
- 2003 - 84.19
- 2004 - 82.76
- 2005 - 80.53
- 2006 - 83.68
- 2007 - 80.58
