= Patrik Bodén =

Swedish javelin thrower

Personal information
- Full name: Lars Patrik Bodén
- Nationality: Swedish
- Born: 30 June 1967 (age 58) Torsby, Sweden
- Height: 1.87 m (6 ft 2 in)
- Weight: 107 kg (236 lb)

Sport
- Country: Sweden
- Sport: Men's Athletics
- Event: Javelin throw

Achievements and titles
- Regional finals: 1990 Split: Javelin throw; Bronze
- Personal bests: NR 89.10 m (1990)
Medal record
Men's athletics
Representing Sweden
European Championships
Bronze medal – third place	1990 Split	Javelin

Lars Patrik Bodén (born 30 June 1967) is a retired Swedish track and field athlete who competed in the javelin throw. He holds the Swedish national record at 89.10 m, which he set on 24 March 1990. He briefly held the world record with this throw until Steve Backley set a new record later the same year.

== Seasonal bests by year ==
- 1986 - 74.66
- 1990 - 89.10 (Collegiate throw)
- 1991 - 79.64
- 1993 - 88.26
- 1994 - 83.54
- 1995 - 80.12
- 1997 - 86.52
- 1998 - 85.15
- 1999 - 84.52
- 2000 - 85.16

== International competitions ==
Representing Sweden
Year	Competition	Venue	Position	Notes
1986	World Junior Championships	Athens, Greece	8th	69.62 m
1990	European Championships	Split, Yugoslavia	3rd	82.66 m
1991	World Championships	Tokyo, Japan	8th	78.58 m
1992	Olympic Games	Barcelona, Spain	16th	77.70 m
1993	World Championships	Stuttgart, Germany	8th	78.00 m
1994	European Championships	Helsinki, Finland	4th	81.34 m
1995	World Championships	Gothenburg, Sweden	15th	77.62 m
1997	World Championships	Athens, Greece	12th	80.66 m
1997	IAAF Grand Prix Final	Fukuoka, Japan	3rd	86.52 m
1998	European Championships	Budapest, Hungary	12th	79.73 m
1999	World Championships	Seville, Spain	24th	75.66 m
2000	Olympic Games	Sydney, Australia	23rd	78.06 m
