= Ēriks Rags =

Latvian javelin thrower

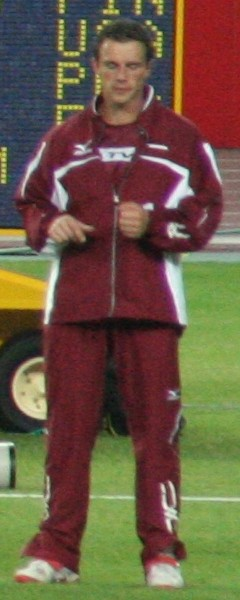
- Rags in Osaka 2007

Personal information
- Born: 1 June 1975 (age 51) Ventspils, Soviet Union

Sport
- Sport: Track and field
Medal record
Representing Latvia
Summer Universiade
Gold medal – first place	1999 Palma de Mallorca	Javelin throw
Gold medal – first place	2001 Beijing	Javelin throw

Ēriks Rags (born 1 June 1975) is a former Latvian javelin thrower. While he never formally announced a retirement, he stepped out of pro competition around 2011-2012. His personal best throw is 86.47 metres, achieved in July 2001 in London. He has competed at three Summer Olympics between 2000 and 2008. He was born in Ventspils.

== Achievements ==
Year	Competition	Venue	Position	Notes
Representing Latvia
1994	World Junior Championships	Lisbon, Portugal	28th (q)	60.52 m
1995	Universiade	Fukuoka, Japan	14th (q)	69.64 m
1997	European U23 Championships	Turku, Finland	4th	78.12 m
1997	World Championships	Athens, Greece	22nd (q)	75.06 m
1997	Universiade	Catania, Italy	6th	74.84 m
1998	European Championships	Budapest, Hungary	21st (q)	74.27 m
1999	Universiade	Palma de Mallorca, Spain	1st	83.79 m
1999	World Championships	Seville, Spain	10th	81.64 m
2000	Olympic Games	Sydney, Australia	26th (q)	75.75 m
2001	World Championships	Edmonton, Canada	8th	82.82 m
2001	Universiade	Beijing, China	1st	82.72 m
2001	Goodwill Games	Brisbane, Australia	3rd	84.68 m
2002	European Championships	Munich, Germany	4th	84.07 m
2003	World Championships	Paris, France	17th (q)	75.72 m
2003	World Athletics Final	Monte Carlo, Monaco	8th	72.20 m
2004	Olympic Games	Athens, Greece	7th	83.14 m
2004	World Athletics Final	Monte Carlo, Monaco	9th	72.67 m
2005	World Championships	Helsinki, Finland	6th	78.77 m
2005	World Athletics Final	Monte Carlo, Monaco	6th	79.86 m
2006	European Championships	Gothenburg, Sweden	9th	79.51 m
2007	World Championships	Osaka, Japan	11th	80.01 m
2008	Olympic Games	Beijing, China	13th (q)	79.33 m
2009	World Championships	Berlin, Germany	26th (q)	76.23 m
2009	World Athletics Final	Thessaloniki, Greece	8th	74.93 m
2010	European Championships	Barcelona, Spain	11th	76.93 m
2011	World Championships	Daegu, South Korea	20th (q)	77.34 m

== Seasonal bests by year ==
- 1997 – 75.06
- 1998 – 80.56
- 1999 – 83.78
- 2000 – 83.61
- 2001 – 86.47
- 2002 – 86.44
- 2003 – 86.32
- 2004 – 85.83
- 2005 – 82.35
- 2006 – 85.99
- 2007 – 83.35
- 2008 – 85.05
- 2009 – 82.23
- 2010 – 82.05
- 2011 – 80.87
- 2012 – 76.49
