= Máximo Rigondeaux =

Cuban javelin thrower

Personal information
- Born: October 17, 1976 (age 49)

Sport
- Country: Cuba
- Sport: Athletics
Medal record
Men's athletics
Representing Cuba
Pan American Games
Silver medal – second place	1999 Winnipeg	Javelin
- Updated on 23 May 2013

Máximo Rigondeaux (born 17 October 1976) is a retired Cuban javelin thrower.

He claimed the silver medal behind compatriot Emeterio González at the 1999 Pan American Games in Winnipeg, Manitoba, Canada. His personal best throw was 81.43 metres, achieved in May 2000 in Dessau.

== Achievements ==
Year	Competition	Venue	Position	Event	Notes
Representing Cuba
1995	Pan American Junior Championships	Santiago, Chile	1st	Javelin throw	67.82 m
1999	Pan American Games	Winnipeg, Canada	2nd	Javelin throw	76.24 m
2005	ALBA Games	La Habana, Cuba	2nd	Javelin throw	78.59 m
