= 1992 World Junior Championships in Athletics – Men's javelin throw =

The men's javelin throw event at the 1992 World Junior Championships in Athletics was held in Seoul, South Korea, at Olympic Stadium on 16 and 18 September.

== Medalists ==
Gold	Aki Parviainen; Finland
Silver	Boris Henry; Germany
Bronze	Kóstas Gatsioúdis; Greece

== Results ==
=== Final ===
The final took place on September 18, and the tournament table is below:

Rank	Name	Nationality	Attempts						Result	Notes
Rank	Name	Nationality	1	2	3	4	5	6	Result	Notes
1st place, gold medalist(s)	Aki Parviainen	Finland	76.18	76.34	72.22	74.86	71.24	x	76.34	
2nd place, silver medalist(s)	Boris Henry	Germany	74.24	75.62	76.04	71.80	75.96	75.16	76.04	
3rd place, bronze medalist(s)	Kóstas Gatsioúdis	Greece	75.92	-	-	-	-	-	75.92	
4	Tero Angeria	Finland	70.28	69.28	70.34	68.78	71.82	72.92	72.92	
5	Mathias Hold	Germany	71.96	69.56	71.04	71.54	72.34	72.52	71.04	
6	Emeterio González	Cuba	70.60	x	57.82	70.52	65.32	62.86	70.60	
7	Andrey Uglov	Commonwealth of Independent States	68.66	x	69.40	65.00	x	x	69.40	
8	Toru Ue	Japan	69.06	-	64.52	61.64	-	64.38	69.06	
9	Xia Zhenghua	China	68.40	66.42	68.08				68.40	
10	Kim Tae-Seong	South Korea	66.04	x	61.36				66.04	
11	Miha Tomc	Slovenia	64.48	64.32	65.02				65.02	
12	Tadayuki Tsuchiya	Japan	60.54	62.14	61.10				62.14	

=== Qualifications ===
16 Sep

==== Group A ====
Rank	Name	Nationality	Attempts			Result	Notes
Rank	Name	Nationality	1	2	3	Result	Notes
1	Aki Parviainen	Finland	77.12	-	-	77.12	Q
2	Mathias Hold	Germany	68.50	-	-	68.50	Q
3	Andrey Uglov	Commonwealth of Independent States	65.74	67.72	-	67.72	Q
4	Miha Tomc	Slovenia	63.24	x	66.92	66.92	q
5	Toru Ue	Japan	66.06	59.64	63.94	66.06	q
6	Xia Zhenghua	China	63.50	65.92	65.70	65.92	q
7	Ali Al-Jadani	Saudi Arabia	55.46	63.90	58.12	63.90	
8	Károly Szabó	Hungary	62.40	x	56.86	62.40	
9	Nery Kennedy	Paraguay	60.84	62.24	x	62.24	
10	Flavio de Souza	Brazil	58.36	60.24	59.88	60.24	
11	Onthusitse Ontletse	Botswana	50.54	-	-	50.54	
	Aitken Stower	New Zealand	x	x	x	NM	

==== Group B ====
Rank	Name	Nationality	Attempts			Result	Notes
Rank	Name	Nationality	1	2	3	Result	Notes
1	Kóstas Gatsioúdis	Greece	76.82	-	-	76.82	Q
2	Boris Henry	Germany	73.26	-	-	73.26	Q
3	Tero Angeria	Finland	68.66	-	-	68.66	Q
4	Emeterio González	Cuba	67.46	68.32	-	68.32	Q
5	Tadayuki Tsuchiya	Japan	66.88	62.10	62.28	66.88	q
6	Kim Tae-Seong	South Korea	60.00	61.68	65.32	65.32	q
7	John Taylor	United States	60.36	61.02	64.50	64.50	
8	Scott Thomson	Australia	64.42	61.42	62.64	64.42	
9	Luka Pengov	Slovenia	64.30	59.38	58.74	64.30	
10	Andelko Trbusic	Croatia	61.18	63.68	63.70	63.70	
11	Juan Manuel López	Mexico	58.44	59.92	62.30	62.30	

== Participation ==
According to an unofficial count, 23 athletes from 19 countries participated in the event.

- Australia (1)
- Botswana (1)
- Brazil (1)
- China (1)
- Commonwealth of Independent States (1)
- Croatia (1)
- Cuba (1)
- Finland (2)
- Germany (2)
- Greece (1)
- Hungary (1)
- Japan (2)
- Mexico (1)
- New Zealand (1)
- Paraguay (1)
- Saudi Arabia (1)
- Slovenia (2)
- South Korea (1)
- United States (1)
