= Athletics at the 1999 Pan American Games – Men's javelin throw =

Men's javelin throw at the Pan American Games

The men's javelin throw event at the 1999 Pan American Games was held on July 27.

== Results ==
Rank	Name	Nationality	#1	#2	#3	#4	#5	#6	Result	Notes
1st place, gold medalist(s)	Emeterio González	Cuba	x	75.28	76.73	77.46	x	76.78	77.46	
2nd place, silver medalist(s)	Máximo Rigondeaux	Cuba	76.24	76.09	76.16	x	75.99	73.51	76.24	
3rd place, bronze medalist(s)	Tom Petranoff	United States	x	x	x	69.01	71.29	75.95	75.95	
4	Nery Kennedy	Paraguay	x	69.51	65.02	70.02	75.16	x	75.16	
5	Edgar Baumann	Paraguay	69.47	x	67.05	67.46	71.40	66.46	71.40	
6	Oscar Duncan	United States	62.23	67.07	x	68.10	70.38	68.82	70.38	
7	Erin Bevans	Canada	64.30	68.78	68.42	–	–	–	68.78	
