= 2001 World Championships in Athletics – Men's javelin throw =

These are the official results of the Men's Javelin Throw event at the 2001 World Championships in Edmonton, Alberta, Canada. There were a total number of 27 participating athletes, with the final held on Sunday August 12, 2001. The qualification mark was set at 84.00 metres.

== Medalists ==
Gold	Jan Železný; Czech Republic (CZE)
Silver	Aki Parviainen; Finland (FIN)
Bronze	Kostas Gatsioudis; Greece (GRE)

== Schedule ==
- All times are Mountain Standard Time (UTC-7)

Qualification Round
Group A	Group B
10.08.2001 – 19:10h	10.08.2001 – 21:00h
Final Round
12.08.2001 – 14:40h

== Abbreviations ==
- All results shown are in metres

Q	automatic qualification
q	qualification by rank
DNS	did not start
NM	no mark
WR	world record
AR	area record
NR	national record
PB	personal best
SB	season best

== Records ==
Standing records prior to the 2001 World Athletics Championships
World Record	Jan Železný (CZE)	98.48 m	May 25, 1996	Jena, Germany
Event Record	Jan Železný (CZE)	89.58 m	August 13, 1995	Gothenburg, Sweden
Season Best	Aki Parviainen (FIN)	92.41 m	June 24, 2001	Vaasa, Finland
Broken records during the 2001 World Athletics Championships
Event Record	Aki Parviainen (FIN)	91.31 m	August 12, 2001	Edmonton, Canada
Event Record	Jan Železný (CZE)	92.80 m	August 12, 2001	Edmonton, Canada
Season Best	Jan Železný (CZE)	92.80 m	August 12, 2001	Edmonton, Canada

== Qualification ==
=== Group A ===
Rank	Overall	Athlete	Attempts			Distance	Note
Rank	Overall	Athlete	1	2	3	Distance	Note
1	2	Konstadinos Gatsioudis (GRE)	87.81	—	—	87.81 m	
2	4	Raymond Hecht (GER)	84.90	—	—	84.90 m	
3	6	Ēriks Rags (LAT)	81.99	77.86	84.13	84.13 m	
4	8	Alexandr Ivanov (RUS)	83.18	78.04	X	83.18 m	
5	12	Li Rongxiang (CHN)	81.39	81.78	80.71	81.78 m	SB
6	14	Steve Backley (GBR)	81.50	80.63	81.40	81.50 m	
7	15	Harri Haatainen (FIN)	X	79.61	81.43	81.43 m	
8	16	Dariusz Trafas (POL)	79.06	81.38	81.07	81.38 m	
9	17	Peter Blank (GER)	80.96	79.11	X	80.96 m	
10	18	Emeterio González (CUB)	74.38	79.71	72.96	79.71 m	
11	20	Tom Pukstys (USA)	78.10	X	72.88	78.10 m	
12	22	Vadim Bavikin (ISR)	77.91	X	71.59	77.91 m	
13	23	Sergey Voynov (UZB)	76.77	X	X	76.77 m	
—	—	Matti Närhi (FIN)	X	X	X	NM	

=== Group B ===
Rank	Overall	Athlete	Attempts			Distance	Note
Rank	Overall	Athlete	1	2	3	Distance	Note
1	1	Jan Železný (CZE)	90.76	—	—	90.76 m	CR
2	3	Boris Henry (GER)	86.53	—	—	86.53 m	SB
3	5	Mick Hill (GBR)	84.88	—	—	84.88 m	SB
4	7	Breaux Greer (USA)	83.60	79.26	—	83.60 m	
5	9	Sergey Makarov (RUS)	81.80	82.92	80.10	82.92 m	
6	10	Voldemārs Lūsis (LAT)	76.13	X	81.85	81.85 m	
7	11	Aki Parviainen (FIN)	81.82	X	81.17	81.82 m	
8	13	Scott Russell (CAN)	79.98	80.04	81.66	81.66 m	NR
9	19	Juha Laukkanen (FIN)	78.28	X	X	78.28 m	
10	21	Nick Nieland (GBR)	78.02	71.61	X	78.02 m	
11	24	Terry McHugh (IRL)	71.99	75.49	73.12	75.49 m	
12	25	Marc Van Mensel (BEL)	71.89	X	X	71.89 m	
13	26	Andreas Thorkildsen (NOR)	66.42	X	68.41	68.41 m	

== Final ==
Rank	Athlete	Attempts						Distance	Note
Rank	Athlete	1	2	3	4	5	6	Distance	Note
1st place, gold medalist(s)	Jan Železný (CZE)	81.76	92.80	89.45	X	87.28	X	92.80 m	CR
2nd place, silver medalist(s)	Aki Parviainen (FIN)	91.31	X	X	X	X	X	91.31 m	
3rd place, bronze medalist(s)	Kostas Gatsioudis (GRE)	X	88.39	87.54	89.95	X	X	89.95 m	
4	Breaux Greer (USA)	87.00	85.61	X	X	X	X	87.00 m	PB
5	Raymond Hecht (GER)	80.61	80.24	86.46	X	81.59	X	86.46 m	
6	Boris Henry (GER)	80.70	85.52	84.52	X	85.51	85.33	85.52 m	
7	Sergey Makarov (RUS)	83.64	78.59	X	X	—	—	83.64 m	
8	Ēriks Rags (LAT)	77.83	79.56	82.82	X	79.66	X	82.82 m	
9	Li Rongxiang (CHN)	79.98	81.80	81.70				81.80 m	SB
10	Alexandr Ivanov (RUS)	X	78.85	80.56				80.56 m	
11	Voldemārs Lūsis (LAT)	X	X	79.70				79.70 m	
12	Mick Hill (GBR)	77.81	X	X				77.81 m	

== See also ==
- 1998 Men's European Championships Javelin Throw (Budapest)
- 2000 Men's Olympic Javelin Throw (Sydney)
- 2002 Men's European Championships Javelin Throw (Munich)
- 2004 Men's Olympic Javelin Throw (Athens)
