= David Brisseault =

French javelin thrower (born 1969)

Personal information
- Full name: David Brisseault
- Nationality: France
- Born: 7 March 1969 (age 57) Nice, France
- Height: 1.85 m (6 ft 1 in)
- Weight: 95 kg (209 lb)

Sport
- Sport: Athletics
- Event: Javelin throw
- Club: Nice Côte d'Azur Athlétisme

Achievements and titles
- Personal best: Javelin throw: 82.20 (2004)

David Brisseault (born 7 March 1969 in Nice) is a retired French javelin thrower. Aged thirty-five, he became one of the oldest athletes to be selected on the French athletics team for the 2004 Summer Olympics after recording a personal best of 82.20 metres from the track and field meet organized by his club Nice Côte d'Azur Athlétisme in his native Nice.

Brisseault qualified for the French squad in the men's javelin throw at the 2004 Summer Olympics in Athens, by attaining an A-standard entry mark of 82.20 metres from an athletic meet in Nice. Brisseault unleashed a javelin at a best throw of 71.86 m on his second attempt in the prelims, finishing nearly eleven metres short of his personal best and placing thirty-first in the overall standings.

Brisseault finished 4th at the 1997 Mediterranean Games and won the 2005 Jeux de la Francophonie.
