= Vladimír Maška =

Vladimír Maška (born 6 February 1973 in Děčín) is a Czech hammer thrower. His personal best throw is 81.28 metres, achieved in May 1999 in Pacov.

He finished twelfth at the 1999 World Championships in Seville and eighth at the 2000 Olympic Games in Sydney.

== Achievements ==
Year	Competition	Venue	Position	Notes
Representing Czechoslovakia
1992	World Junior Championships	Seoul, South Korea	15th	59.48 m
Representing the Czech Republic
1997	World Championships	Athens, Greece	34th	70.50 m
1999	World Championships	Seville, Spain	12th	75.26 m
2000	Olympic Games	Sydney, Australia	8th	76.70 m
2001	World Championships	Edmonton, Canada	24th	74.20 m
2002	European Championships	Munich, Germany	24th	74.52 m
2003	World Championships	Paris, France	—	DNS
2004	Olympic Games	Athens, Greece	29th	71.76 m
2006	European Championships	Gothenburg, Sweden	21st	68.63 m
