= Aki Parviainen =

Finnish javelin thrower (born 1974)

Personal information
- Full name: Aki Uolevi Parviainen
- Nationality: Finnish
- Born: 26 October 1974 (age 51) Helsinki, Finland
- Years active: 1995–2006
- Height: 1.91 m (6 ft 3 in)
- Weight: 96 kg (212 lb)

Sport
- Country: Finland (1995–2005)
- Sport: Track and field
- Event: Javelin throw

Achievements and titles
- Personal bests: NR 93.09 m (1999)
Medal record
Men's Athletics
Representing Finland
World Championships
Gold medal – first place	1999 Seville	Javelin
Silver medal – second place	2001 Edmonton	Javelin

Aki Uolevi Parviainen (born 26 October 1974) is a retired Finnish track and field athlete who competed in the javelin throw. He won the gold medal at the 1999 World Championships and the silver medal at the 2001 World Championships. His best throw of 93.09 m, set in 1999, is the Finnish record and ranks him fourth on the overall list. His best Olympic placing was fifth, which he achieved in 2000.

In the spring of 2006, Parviainen announced his retirement due to injuries.

== International competitions ==
Year	Competition	Venue	Position	Notes
Representing Finland
1992	World Junior Championships	Seoul, South Korea	1st	76.34 m
1995	World Championships	Gothenburg, Sweden	9th	79.58 m
1997	World Championships	Athens, Greece	8th	82.80 m
1998	European Championships	Budapest, Hungary	9th	82.30 m
1999	World Championships	Seville, Spain	1st	89.52 m
2000	Summer Olympics	Sydney, Australia	5th	86.62 m
2001	World Championships	Edmonton, Canada	2nd	91.31 m
2002	European Championships	Munich, Germany	8th	78.92 m
2003	World Championships	Paris, France	5th	83.05 m
2005	World Championships	Helsinki, Finland	9th	74.86 m

== Seasonal bests by year ==
- 1990 – 63.50
- 1991 – 79.96
- 1992 – 80.94
- 1993 – 69.94
- 1994 – 78.76
- 1995 – 85.60
- 1996 – 84.96
- 1997 – 87.48
- 1998 – 90.88
- 1999 – 93.09
- 2000 – 90.97
- 2001 – 92.41
- 2002 – 82.48
- 2003 – 83.30
- 2004 – 79.32
- 2005 – 83.79
