= Sergey Makarov (javelin thrower) =

Russian javelin thrower

Personal information
- Native name: Сеҏгей Александрович Макаров
- Full name: Sergey Aleksandrovich Makarov
- Nationality: Russian
- Born: March 19, 1973 (age 53) Podolsk, Russian SFSR, Soviet Union
- Height: 1.92 m (6 ft 4 in)
- Weight: 90 kg (198 lb)

Sport
- Country: Russia (1996–2011)
- Sport: Track and field
- Event: Javelin throw
- Club: Dynamo Moskva

Achievements and titles
- Olympic finals: (bronze) 2000, 2004
- World finals: (gold) 2003 (bronze) 2005
- Regional finals: (silver) 2002
- Personal bests: 92.61 m NR (2002)
Medal record
Men's athletics
Representing Russia
Olympic Games
Bronze medal – third place	2000 Sydney	Javelin throw
Bronze medal – third place	2004 Athens	Javelin throw
World Championships
Gold medal – first place	2003 Paris	Javelin throw
Bronze medal – third place	2005 Helsinki	Javelin throw
European Championships
Silver medal – second place	2002 Munich	Javelin throw

Sergey Aleksandrovich Makarov (Russian: Серге́й Александрович Макаров; born March 19, 1973) is a former Russian javelin thrower. His personal best throw of 92.61 m, set in 2002, is the Russian record. Facing tough competition throughout his career from Jan Železný, Steve Backley and others, Makarov did not win any major competition until 2003, when he became World Champion at the age of 30.

Born into a sporting family, Makarov's father, Aleksandr, won the silver medal in the javelin throw at the 1980 Summer Olympics.

He is married to Oksana Ovchinnikova, former holder of the Russian record in women's javelin.

== International competitions ==
Year	Competition	Venue	Position	Notes
Representing Russia
1996	Olympic Games	Atlanta, United States	6th	85.30 m
1997	World Championships	Athens, Greece	5th	86.32 m
1997	IAAF Grand Prix Final	Fukuoka, Japan	6th	81.62 m
1998	European Championships	Budapest, Hungary	4th	86.45 m
1998	Goodwill Games	Uniondale, United States	1st	84.11 m
1999	World Championships	Seville, Spain	9th	83.20 m
2000	Olympic Games	Sydney, Australia	3rd	88.67 m
2001	World Championships	Edmonton, Canada	7th	83.64 m
2002	European Championships	Munich, Germany	2nd	88.05 m
2003	World Championships	Paris, France	1st	85.44 m
2003	World Athletics Final	Monte Carlo, Monaco	1st	85.66 m
2004	Olympic Games	Athens, Greece	3rd	84.84 m
2004	World Athletics Final	Monte Carlo, Monaco	4th	80.34 m
2005	World Championships	Helsinki, Finland	3rd	83.54 m
2005	World Athletics Final	Monte Carlo, Monaco	3rd	86.69 m
2008	Olympic Games	Beijing, China	26th	72.47 m
2010	European Championships	Barcelona, Spain	7th	80.86 m
2011	World Championships	Daegu, South Korea	12th	78.76 m

== Seasonal bests by year ==
- 1991: 73.48
- 1992: 76.08
- 1993: 75.78
- 1994: 82.54
- 1995: 84.42
- 1996: 88.86
- 1997: 88.54
- 1998: 86.96
- 1999: 89.93
- 2000: 89.92
- 2001: 88.42
- 2002: 92.61 (personal best)
- 2003: 90.11
- 2004: 86.19
- 2005: 90.33
- 2006: 88.49
- 2007: 87.46
- 2008: 86.88
- 2009: 84.24
- 2010: 83.59
- 2011: 87.12
- 2012: 83.39
