= Michaela Hejnová =

Czech track athlete

Personal information
- Full name: Michaela Hejnová
- Nationality: Czech Republic
- Born: 10 April 1980 (age 46) Liberec, Czechoslovakia
- Height: 168 cm (5 ft 6 in)
- Weight: 61 kg (134 lb)

Sport
- Sport: Athletics
- Event: Heptathlon
- Club: PSK Olymp Praha
- Coached by: Martina Blažková

Achievements and titles
- Personal best(s): Heptathlon: 6065 points (2004)
Medal record
Women's athletics
Representing the Czech Republic
Universiade
Bronze medal – third place	2003 Daegu	Heptathlon

Michaela Hejnová (born 10 April 1980) is a Czech former track and field athlete, specializing in the heptathlon. She has competed for the Czech Republic at the 2004 Summer Olympics and has won a bronze medal in heptathlon at the 2003 Summer Universiade in Daegu, South Korea. Hejnova set a personal best score of 6065 points at a national meet in Hradec Králové. While competing at PSK Olymp Praha in Prague, Hejnova trains for the national track and field team in heptathlon under the tutelage of her personal coach Martina Blažková.

== Career ==
Born in Liberec, Hejnova established her heptathlon history in 1999 with a silver-medal performance at the European Junior Championships in Riga, Latvia, producing a total score of 5786 points. Four years later, Hejnova highlighted her sporting career on the world stage at the 2003 Summer Universiade in Daegu, South Korea, where she claimed the bronze behind Australian duo Kylie Wheeler and Jane Jamieson in the women's heptathlon with a score of 5795 points.

At the 2004 Summer Olympics in Athens, Hejnova qualified for the Czech team in the women's heptathlon. Less than a month before the Games, she cleared the IAAF Olympic "B" standard and improved her personal best score to 6065 points at the national trials in Hradec Králové to book her place on the Czech Olympic track and field roster. Despite putting up her rewarding effort in the javelin throw, Hejnova could only manage twenty-sixth place in the competition with a total score of 5716, nearly three hundred points below her entry standard.

== Personal life ==
Hejnova is also the sister of 400-metre hurdler Zuzana Hejnová, who later claimed the silver medal at the 2012 Summer Olympics in London, and two championship titles at the Worlds (both in 2013 and 2015).

== Personal bests ==
Event	Best	Venue	Year	Notes
100 meter hurdles	13.21 s	Plzeň, Czech Republic	June 25, 2004	
High jump	1.73 m	Arles, France	June 5, 2004	
Shot put	12.69 m	Hengelo, Netherlands	July 3, 2004	
200 metres	24.87 s	Prague, Czech Republic	July 3, 2004	
Long jump	6.09 m	Prague, Czech Republic	July 23, 2000	
Javelin throw	51.01 m	Alhama de Murcia, Spain	May 20, 2001	
800 metres	2:14.14	Prague, Czech Republic	July 23, 2000	
Heptathlon	6,065 points	Hradec Králové, Czech Republic	July 18, 2004	

- All information taken from IAAF profile.
