= Emeterio González =

Cuban javelin thrower (born 1973)

Personal information
- Born: April 11, 1973 (age 53) San Juan y Martínez, Pinar del Río, Cuba

Sport
- Sport: Track and field
Medal record
Athletics
Representing Cuba
Pan American Games
Gold medal – first place	1995 Mar del Plata	Javelin throw
Gold medal – first place	1999 Winnipeg	Javelin throw
Gold medal – first place	2003 Santo Domingo	Javelin throw
Central American and Caribbean Games
Gold medal – first place	1998 Maracaibo	Javelin throw
Bronze medal – third place	1993 Ponce	Javelin throw
Summer Universiade
Silver medal – second place	1997 Catania	Javelin throw
CAC Junior Championships (U20)
Gold medal – first place	1990 Havana	Javelin throw

Emeterio González Silva (born April 11, 1973) is a Cuban former javelin thrower, whose current personal best throw is 87.12 metres, achieved in June 2000 in Jena.

== International competitions ==
Year	Competition	Venue	Position	Event	Notes
Representing Cuba
1990	Central American and Caribbean Junior Championships (U-20)	Havana, Cuba	1st	Javelin	62.42 m
1992	World Junior Championships	Seoul, South Korea	6th	Javelin	70.60 m
1993	Central American and Caribbean Championships	Cali, Colombia	3rd	Javelin	71.18 m
1993	Central American and Caribbean Games	Ponce, Puerto Rico	3rd	Javelin	71.24 m
1994	World Cup	London, United Kingdom	7th	Javelin	76.42 m
1995	Pan American Games	Mar del Plata, Argentina	1st	Javelin	79.28 m
1995	World Championships	Gothenburg, Sweden	17th	Javelin	76.54 m
1996	Olympic Games	Atlanta, United States	18th	Javelin	77.94 m
1997	World Championships	Athens, Greece	7th	Javelin	83.56 m
1997	Universiade	Catania, Italy	2nd	Javelin	83.48 m
1998	Central American and Caribbean Games	Maracaibo, Venezuela	1st	Javelin	80.92 m
1998	World Cup	Johannesburg, South Africa	5th	Javelin	80.72 m
1999	Universiade	Palma de Mallorca, Spain	4th	Javelin	80.73 m
1999	Pan American Games	Winnipeg, Canada	1st	Javelin	77.46 m
1999	World Championships	Seville, Spain	7th	Javelin	84.32 m = NR
2000	Ibero-American Championships	Rio de Janeiro, Brazil	1st	Javelin	80.02 m
2000	Olympic Games	Sydney, Australia	8th	Javelin	83.33 m
2001	World Championships	Edmonton, Canada	18th	Javelin	79.71 m
2002	World Cup	Madrid, Spain	3rd	Javelin	79.77 m
2003	Pan American Games	Santo Domingo, Dominican Republic	1st	Javelin	81.72 m
2003	World Championships	Paris, France	16th	Javelin	76.18 m
2004	Ibero-American Championships	Huelva, Spain	2nd	Javelin	76.34 m
2005	Central American and Caribbean Championships	Nassau, Bahamas	1st	Javelin	76.44 m

== Seasonal bests by year ==
- 1992 – 73.56
- 1995 – 82.64
- 1996 – 77.94
- 1997 – 83.56
- 1998 – 84.20
- 1999 – 84.32
- 2000 – 87.12
- 2001 – 82.77
- 2002 – 82.63
- 2003 – 81.72
- 2004 – 80.70
- 2005 – 80.50
- 2006 – 79.94
- 2007 – 70.61
