= Breaux Greer =

American javelin thrower

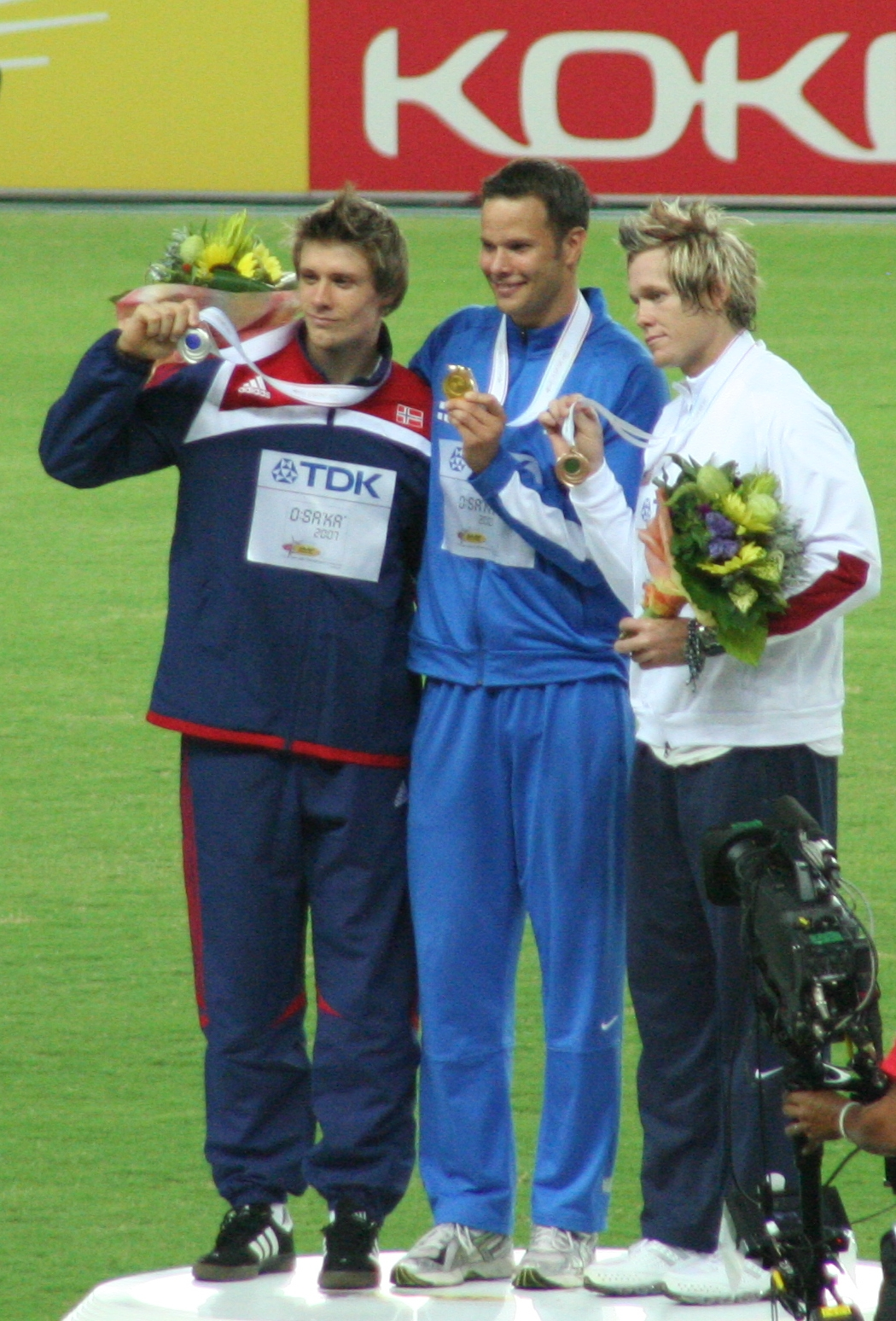
- Greer (right) at the 2007 World Athletics Championships

Personal information
- Born: October 19, 1976 (age 50) Houston, Texas, U.S.
- Height: 1.88 m (6 ft 2 in)
- Weight: 102 kg (225 lb)

Sport
- Country: United States
- Sport: Track and field
- Event: Javelin throw

Achievements and titles
- Personal bests: NACACR 91.36 m (2007)
Medal record
Representing USA
World Championships
Bronze medal – third place	2007 Osaka	Javelin
Pan American Games
Bronze medal – third place	2003 Santo Domingo	Javelin throw

Breaux Greer (born October 19, 1976) is a retired American track and field athlete who competed in the javelin throw. After attending Ouachita Parish High School and the University of Louisiana at Monroe, he went on to be the current American record holder in the event, with a throw of 91.29 m (299.5 ft), achieved on June 21, 2007, at the 2007 USA Outdoor Championships. With it, he is currently ranked as the #18 thrower in history. This was also the best throw in the world for almost eight years until surpassed by Julius Yego in 2015. He is an eight-time American Champion, consecutively from 2000 until 2007. His coach was Finnish javelin thrower Kari Ihalainen.

Greer appeared on the second season of the 2008 version of American Gladiators as Hurricane.

== Achievements ==
Year	Competition	Venue	Position	Notes
Representing the United States
1997	USA Outdoor Championships	Indianapolis, Indiana	3rd	78.10 m
2000	Olympic Games	Sydney, Australia	12th	82.63 m (qual); 79.91 m (final)
2001	USA Outdoor Championships	Eugene, Oregon	1st	85.23 m
2001	World Championships	Edmonton, Canada	4th	87.00 m
2001	Goodwill Games	Brisbane, Australia	2nd	85.86 m
2003	Pan American Games	Santo Domingo, Dominican Republic	3rd	79.21 m
2003	World Championships	Paris, France	14th	76.82 m
2004	World Athletics Final	Monte Carlo, Monaco	1st	87.68 m (NR)
2004	Olympic Games	Athens, Greece	12th	87.25 m (qual); 74.36 m (final)
2005	Mt. SAC Relays	Walnut, California	1st	87.65 m
2006	Diamond League - Meeting de Paris	Paris, France	3rd	85.45 m
2007	Diamond League - Bislett Games	Oslo, Norway	2nd	88.73 m
2007	USA Outdoor Championships	Indianapolis, Indiana	1st	91.29 m (AR, NR)
2007	World Championships	Osaka, Japan	3rd	86.21 m
2008	Olympic Games	Beijing, China	22nd	73.68 m

== Personal life ==
Greer and his wife, actress Katy Mixon, had a son in May 2017 and a daughter in May 2018.
