= Mick Hill (javelin thrower) =

English javelin thrower (born 1964)

Personal information
- Nationality: British (English)
- Born: 22 October 1964 (age 61) Leeds, England
- Height: 190 cm (6 ft 3 in)
- Weight: 98 kg (216 lb)

Sport
- Sport: Athletics
- Event: Javelin throw
- Club: Leeds City AC
Medal record
Men's athletics
Representing Great Britain
World Championships
Bronze medal – third place	1993 Stuttgart	Javelin
European Championships
Silver medal – second place	1998 Budapest	Javelin
Representing England
Commonwealth Games
Silver medal – second place	1986 Edinburgh	Javelin
Silver medal – second place	1990 Auckland	Javelin
Silver medal – second place	1994 Victoria	Javelin
Bronze medal – third place	1998 Kuala Lumpur	Javelin

Michael Christopher Hill (born 22 October 1964) is a male English former javelin thrower who competed at four Olympic Games from 1988 to 2000.

== Biography ==
Hill, born in Leeds, West Yorkshire, won a bronze medal at the 1993 World Championships and a silver medal at the 1998 European Championships. He represented Great Britain at four Olympic Games and competed in over 20 major championships between 1983 and 2002, only failing to reach the final twice. He has since coached heptathlete Jessica Ennis.

He is also a four-time Commonwealth Games medallist. He represented England and won a silver medal, at the 1986 Commonwealth Games in Edinburgh, Scotland. Four years later he represented England and won another silver, at the 1990 Commonwealth Games in Auckland, New Zealand. A third silver medal was won when he represented England at the 1994 Commonwealth Games in Victoria, British Columbia, Canada before he won his first medal of a different colour, winning a bronze medal for England, at the 1998 Commonwealth Games in Kuala Lumpur, Malaysia.

Hill is a seven-times British javelin throw champion having won the British AAA Championships title for the first time at the 1987 AAA Championships and subsequently in 1990, 1991, 1994, 1995, 2002 and 2003.

Additionally he won the UK Athletics Championships title in 1985, 1986, 1987, 1992 and 1993 and was a great rival of Steve Backley.

== Achievements ==
Year	Competition	Venue	Position	Notes
Representing Great Britain and England
1983	European Junior Championships	Schwechat, Austria	11th	66.44 m
1986	Commonwealth Games	Edinburgh, United Kingdom	2nd	78.56 m
1986	European Championships	Stuttgart, West Germany	8th	77.34 m
1987	World Championships	Rome, Italy	7th	79.66 m
1988	Olympic Games	Seoul, South Korea	20th (q)	77.20 m
1990	Commonwealth Games	Auckland, New Zealand	2nd	83.32 m
1990	European Championships	Split, SFR Yugoslavia	4th	82.38 m
1991	World Championships	Tokyo, Japan	5th	84.12 m
1992	Olympic Games	Barcelona, Spain	11th	75.50 m
1992	World Cup	Havana, Cuba	5th	76.84 m
1993	World Championships	Stuttgart, Germany	3rd	82.96 m
1993	Grand Prix Final	London, United Kingdom	3rd	83.52 m
1994	European Championships	Helsinki, Finland	6th	80.66 m
1994	Commonwealth Games	Victoria, Canada	2nd	81.84 m
1995	World Championships	Gothenburg, Sweden	6th	81.06 m
1996	Olympic Games	Atlanta, United States	12th	78:58 m
1997	World Championships	Athens, Greece	4th	86.54 m
1997	Grand Prix Final	Fukuoka, Japan	5th	82.28 m
1998	European Championships	Budapest, Hungary	2nd	86.92 m
1998	Commonwealth Games	Kuala Lumpur, Malaysia	3rd	83.80 m
1999	World Championships	Seville, Spain	14th (q)	80.75 m
2000	Olympic Games	Sydney, Australia	11th	81.00 m
2001	World Championships	Edmonton, Canada	12th	77.81 m
2002	European Championships	Munich, Germany	10th	76.12 m
Results with a (q) indicate overall position in qualifying round

== Seasonal bests by year ==
- 1986 - 78.56
- 1987 - 85.24
- 1988 - 81.30
- 1989 - 82.56
- 1990 - 82.38
- 1991 - 84.12
- 1992 - 85.32
- 1993 - 86.94
- 1994 - 86.36
- 1995 - 84.14
- 1996 - 81.42
- 1997 - 86.54
- 1998 - 86.92
- 1999 - 84.94
- 2000 - 83.71
- 2001 - 84.88
- 2002 - 82.90
- 2003 - 78.73
- 2004 - 80.46
