= Miroslav Guzdek =

Czech javelin thrower

Miroslav Guzdek (born 3 August 1975 in Třinec) is a Czech javelin thrower. His personal best throw is 85.74 metres, achieved in April 2002 in Germiston.

He finished seventh at the 2003 World Championships in Paris with a throw of 81.40 metres. He also competed in the 2004 Olympics, but failed to qualify from his pool.

== Achievements ==
Year	Competition	Venue	Position	Notes
2002	European Championships	Munich, Germany	20th	75.84 m
2003	World Championships	Paris, France	7th	81.40 m
2004	Olympic Games	Athens, Greece	23rd	76.45 m

== Seasonal bests by year ==
- 1999 – 77.36
- 2000 – 79.13
- 2001 – 82.40
- 2002 – 85.74
- 2003 – 83.71
- 2004 – 79.06
- 2006 – 75.06
- 2007 – 78.32
- 2008 – 76.68
- 2009 – 77.91
- 2010 – 76.83
