= Miroslav Vítek =

Czech discus thrower (1909–1976)

Personal information
- Citizenship: Czechoslovakia
- Born: 30 March 1909 Ivančice, Moravia, Austria-Hungary
- Died: 30 March 1976 (aged 67)

Sport
- Sport: Athletics
- Events: Discus throw, shot put

Miroslav Vítek (30 March 1909 – 30 March 1976) was a Czech athlete. He competed for Czechoslovakia in the men's discus throw and shot put at the 1936 Summer Olympics.
