= Boris Henry =

German javelin thrower

Boris Obergföll
Personal information
- Born: Boris Henry; 14 December 1973 (age 52) Völklingen, West Germany
- Height: 1.93 m (6 ft 4 in)
- Weight: 105 kg (231 lb)
- Spouse: Christina Obergföll (m. 2013)

Sport
- Country: Germany
- Sport: Track and field
- Event: Javelin throw

Achievements and titles
- Personal best: 90.44 m (1997)
Medal record
Men's athletics
Representing Germany
World Championships
Bronze medal – third place	1995 Gothenburg	Javelin
Bronze medal – third place	2003 Paris	Javelin
European Championships
Bronze medal – third place	2002 Munich	Javelin

Boris Obergföll (né Henry; born 14 December 1973) is a retired German track and field athlete who competed in the javelin throw. He won a bronze medal in the World Championships twice (1995 and 2003). His personal best throw was 90.44 metres, set in July 1997. This ranks him sixth among German javelin (new implement) throwers, behind Johannes Vetter, Thomas Röhler, Raymond Hecht, Andreas Hofmann and Julian Weber.

He also competed in the javelin throw at the 1996 Summer Olympics (fifth place) and the 2000 Summer Olympics (seventh place). He was entered into the 2004 Summer Olympics but did not start the competition and retired thereafter.

He represented SV Saar 05 Saarbrücken and was trained by Klaus Bartonietz. He is 193 cm (6 ft 4 in) tall and weighed 105 kilograms (231 lb) while he was competing. He is married to Christina Obergföll, whose surname he adopted upon marriage.

== International competitions ==
Year	Competition	Venue	Position	Notes
Representing Germany
1992	World Junior Championships	Seoul, South Korea	2nd	76.04 m
1993	World Championships	Stuttgart, Germany	14th	77.42 m
1994	European Championships	Helsinki, Finland	11th	76.88 m
1995	World Championships	Gothenburg, Sweden	3rd	86.08 m
1995	Military World Games	Rome, Italy	1st	84.80 m
1996	Olympic Games	Atlanta, United States	5th	85.68 m
1997	European Cup	Munich, Germany	3rd	85.42 m
1997	World Championships	Athens, Greece	6th	84.54 m
1997	IAAF Grand Prix Final	Fukuoka, Japan	2nd	86.76 m
1998	European Cup	Saint Petersburg, Russia	1st	84.77 m
1999	World Championships	Seville, Spain	6th	85.43 m
1999	Military World Games	Zagreb, Croatia	1st	85.69 m GR
2000	European Cup	Gateshead, United Kingdom	3rd	82.83 m
2000	Olympic Games	Sydney, Australia	7th	85.78 m
2001	World Championships	Edmonton, Canada	6th	85.52 m
2001	IAAF Grand Prix Final	Melbourne, Australia	3rd	85.43 m
2001	Goodwill Games	Brisbane, Australia	5th	82.34 m
2002	European Cup	Annecy, France	3rd	83.90 m
2002	European Championships	Munich, Germany	3rd	85.33 m
2002	IAAF World Cup	Madrid, Spain	2nd	81.60 m
2003	World Championships	Paris, France	3rd	84.74 m

- IAAF Golden League
  - Bislett Games: 2002
  - Memorial Van Damme: 2002, 2003
  - ISTAF: 2002

== National titles ==
- German Athletics Championships
  - Javelin throw: 1995, 1997, 1998, 2000, 2003, 2004

== Seasonal bests ==
- 1989 – 58.20
- 1990 – 65.86
- 1991 – 74.78
- 1992 – 77.34
- 1993 – 84.12
- 1994 – 82.02
- 1995 – 88.46
- 1996 – 88.00
- 1997 – 90.44
- 1998 – 89.21
- 1999 – 88.62
- 2000 – 86.65
- 2001 – 86.53
- 2002 – 86.67
- 2003 – 88.10
- 2004 – 86.86
- 2006 – 68.89
