= Gergely Horváth =

Hungarian javelin thrower

Personal information
- Full name: Gergely Horváth
- Nationality: Hungarian
- Born: 5 June 1975 (age 51) Budapest, Hungary
- Height: 1.86 m (6 ft 1 in)
- Weight: 100 kg (220 lb)

Sport
- Country: Hungary
- Sport: Javelin throw

Achievements and titles
- Personal best: 81.55 m
Medal record
Representing Hungary
Summer Universiade
Bronze medal – third place	2001 Beijing	Javelin throw

Gergely Horváth (pronounced [ˈɡɛrɡɛj ˈhorvaːt]; born 5 June 1975) is a retired Hungarian male javelin thrower and seven time national champion. His personal best throw is 81.55 metres, achieved in August 2003 in Nyíregyháza, which is also the Hungarian national record.

In 2007 Horváth was found guilty of boldenone doping. The sample was delivered on 22 July 2006 in an in-competition test in Debrecen. He received a suspension by the IAAF from September 2006 to September 2008, as well as disqualification of all results accomplished since the day he was tested.

== Achievements ==
Year	Competition	Venue	Position	Notes
Representing Hungary
1997	European U23 Championships	Turku, Finland	12th	70.02 m
1998	European Championships	Budapest, Hungary	19th	75.66 m
2001	Summer Universiade	Beijing, PR China	3rd	80.03 m
2002	European Championships	Munich, Germany	18th	77.93 m
2003	World Championships	Paris, France	19th	74.76 m
2004	Olympic Games	Athens, Greece	26th	73.95 m
2005	World Championships	Helsinki, Finland	22nd	72.33 m

== Seasonal bests by year ==
- 1998 - 80.53
- 1999 - 78.36
- 2000 - 79.57
- 2001 - 80.80
- 2002 - 81.14
- 2003 - 81.55
- 2004 - 80.08
- 2005 - 80.91
- 2006 - 77.23
- 2009 - 68.85

== See also ==
- List of doping cases in athletics
