= Konstadinos Gatsioudis =

Greek javelin thrower (born 1973)

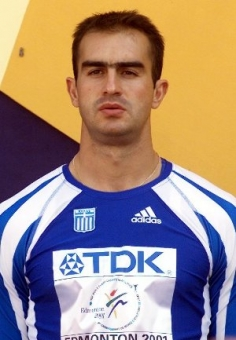

Personal information
- Born: 17 December 1973 (age 52) Didymoteicho, Greece
- Height: 1.89 m (6 ft 2 in)
- Weight: 97 kg (214 lb)

Sport
- Country: Greece
- Sport: Track and field
- Event: Javelin throw

Achievements and titles
- Personal bests: NR 91.69 m (2000)
Medal record
Men's athletics
Representing Greece
World Championships
Silver medal – second place	1999 Seville	Javelin
Bronze medal – third place	1997 Athens	Javelin
Bronze medal – third place	2001 Edmonton	Javelin

Konstadinos Gatsioudis (Greek: Κωνσταντίνος Γκατσιούδης; born 17 December 1973) is a retired Greek track and field athlete who competed in the javelin throw. His personal best throw of 91.69 m, achieved in 2000, is the Greek record.

Born in Didymoteicho, Gatsioudis set a world junior record in 1990 and eight national records during his career. He was named the 1997 Greek Male Athlete of the Year.

== International competitions ==
Year	Competition	Venue	Position	Notes
Representing Greece
1990	World Junior Championships	Plovdiv, Bulgaria	6th	69.90 m
1992	World Junior Championships	Seoul, South Korea	3rd	75.92 m
1993	World Championships	Stuttgart, Germany	17th (q)	76.70 m
1993	Mediterranean Games	Narbonne, France	3rd	77.00 m
1994	European Championships	Helsinki, Finland	14th (q)	78.56 m
1995	Military World Games	Rome, Italy	3rd	82.70 m
1996	Olympic Games	Atlanta, United States	10th	81.46 m
1997	Mediterranean Games	Bari, Italy	1st	89.22 m
1997	World Championships	Athens, Greece	3rd	86.64 m
1999	World Championships	Seville, Spain	2nd	89.18 m
2000	Olympic Games	Sydney, Australia	6th	86.53 m
2001	World Championships	Edmonton, Canada	3rd	89.95 m

== Seasonal bests by year ==
- 1990 - 69.90
- 1992 - 80.30
- 1993 - 78.44
- 1994 - 83.82
- 1995 - 82.70
- 1996 - 87.12
- 1997 - 89.22
- 1998 - 88.13
- 1999 - 89.84
- 2000 - 91.69
- 2001 - 91.27
- 2002 - 91.23
- 2006 - 75.40
