= Raymond Hecht =

German javelin thrower

Personal information
- Born: November 11, 1968 (age 57) Gardelegen, Bezirk Magdeburg, East Germany
- Height: 1.91 m (6 ft 3 in)
- Weight: 105 kg (231 lb)

Sport
- Country: East Germany; Germany
- Sport: Track and field
- Event: Javelin throw
- Club: SC Magdeburg

Achievements and titles
- Personal best: 92.60 m (1995)
Medal record
Men's athletics
Representing Germany
European Athletics Championships
Bronze medal – third place	1998 Budapest	Javelin

Raymond Hecht (born 11 November 1968) is a German track and field athlete who competed in the javelin throw. His personal best throw is 92.60 m, achieved in 1995. This places him eighth on the all-time rankings.

During his career, Hecht set five German records. His best result in international competition was a bronze medal at the 1998 European Championships. At a club level, he represented SC Magdeburg in former East Germany.

In 2015, he won the M45 division of the World Masters Championships, representing France.

== Seasonal bests by year ==
- 1986 - 71.08
- 1987 - 75.90
- 1990 - 83.24
- 1991 - 81.92
- 1992 - 79.58
- 1993 - 88.90
- 1994 - 90.06
- 1995 - 92.60
- 1996 - 92.28
- 1997 - 87.32
- 1998 - 88.08
- 1999 - 88.67
- 2000 - 87.76
- 2001 - 88.88
- 2002 - 87.87
- 2003 - 86.22
- 2004 - 82.85
- 2005 - 77.20
- 2006 - 73.94

== International competitions ==
Year	Competition	Venue	Position	Notes
Representing East Germany
1987	European Junior Championships	Birmingham, United Kingdom	3rd	72.78 m
1990	European Championships	Split, Yugoslavia	10th	77.72 m
Representing Germany
1991	World Championships	Tokyo, Japan	12th	70.58 m
1993	World Championships	Stuttgart, Germany	23rd	75.00 m
1994	European Championships	Helsinki, Finland	5th	81.18 m
1995	World Championships	Gothenburg, Sweden	4th	83.30 m
1996	Olympic Games	Atlanta, United States	4th	86.88 m
1997	World Championships	Athens, Greece	13th	79.38 m
1998	European Championships	Budapest, Hungary	3rd	86.63 m
1999	World Championships	Seville, Spain	5th	85.92 m
2000	Olympic Games	Sydney, Australia	4th	87.76 m
2001	World Championships	Edmonton, Canada	5th	86.46 m
2002	European Championships	Munich, Germany	5th	83.95 m
