= Athletics at the Central Asian Games =

Athletics was one of the sports at the biennial Central Asian Games. Athletics competitions were held at every edition of the games since 1995 and it is one of the core sports of the games.

== Editions ==
| Games | Year | Host city | Host country | Dates | Events |
|---|---|---|---|---|---|
| 1 | 1995 | Tashkent | Uzbekistan | | |
| 2 | 1997 | Almaty | Kazakhstan | | |
| 3 | 1999 | Bishkek | Kyrgyzstan | | |
| 4 | 2001 (cancelled) | Ashgabat | Turkmenistan | | |
| 5 | 2003 | Dushanbe | Tajikistan | | |
| 6 | 2005 | Tashkent | Uzbekistan | | |

== Champions ==
=== Men's 100 metres ===
- 1995: Anvar Kuchmuradov (UZB)
- 1997: Vitaliy Medvedev (KAZ)
- 1999: Vitaliy Medvedev (KAZ)
- 2003: Gennadiy Chernovol (KAZ)

=== Men's 200 metres ===
- 1995: Viktor Zyabkin (KAZ)
- 1997: Gennadiy Chernovol (KAZ)
- 1999: Vitaliy Medvedev (KAZ)
- 2003: Gennadiy Chernovol (KAZ)

=== Men's 400 metres ===
- 1995: Aleksey Faizulov (UZB)
- 1997: Aleksey Faizulov (UZB)
- 1999: Yuriy Gayev (KAZ)
- 2003: Yevgeniy Meleshenko (KAZ)

=== Men's 800 metres ===
- 1995: Boris Kaveshnikov (KGZ)
- 1997: Boris Kaveshnikov (KGZ)
- 1999: Boris Kaveshnikov (KGZ)
- 2003: Mikhail Kolganov (KAZ)

=== Men's 1500 metres ===
- 1995: Marly Sopyev (TKM)
- 1997: Boris Kaveshnikov (KGZ)
- 1999: Not held
- 2003: Mikhail Kolganov (KAZ)

=== Men's 5000 metres ===
- 1995: Marly Sopyev (TKM)
- 1997: Aleksandr Saprykin (KAZ)
- 1999: Takhir Mamashayev (KAZ)
- 2003: Denis Bagrev (KGZ)

=== Men's 10,000 metres ===
- 1995: Not held
- 1997: Aleksandr Saprykin (KAZ)
- 1999: Takhir Mamashayev (KAZ)
- 2003: Sergey Milyutin (KAZ)

=== Men's 3000 m steeplechase ===
- 1995: Aleksandr Saprykin (KAZ)
- 1997: Aleksey Shestakov (KAZ)
- 1999: Aleksey Shestakov (KAZ)
- 2003: Yevgeniy Stakanov (TJK)

=== Men's 110 m hurdles ===
- 1995: Andrey Sklyarenko (KAZ)
- 1997: Andrey Sklyarenko (KAZ)
- 1999: Andrey Sklyarenko (KAZ)
- 2003: Andrey Korniyenko (UZB)

=== Men's 400 m hurdles ===
- 1995: Erkinjon Isakov (UZB)
- 1997: Oleg Verzilin (KAZ)
- 1999: Pavel Remizov (UZB)
- 2003: Yevgeniy Meleshenko (KAZ)

=== Men's high jump ===
- 1995: Yuriy Pakhlyayev (KAZ)
- 1997: Yuriy Pakhlyayev (KAZ)
- 1999: Yuriy Pakhlyayev (KAZ)
- 2003: Pavel Dubitskiy (KAZ)

=== Men's pole vault ===
- 1995: Not held
- 1997: Aleksandr Korchagin (KAZ)
- 1999: Maksim Tsyganov (KAZ)
- 2003: Not held

=== Men's long jump ===
- 1995: Konstantin Sarnatskiy (UZB)
- 1997: Konstantin Sarnatskiy (UZB)
- 1999: Sergey Arzamasov (KAZ)
- 2003: Rustam Khusnutdinov (UZB)

=== Men's triple jump ===
- 1995: Oleg Sakirkin (KAZ)
- 1997: Sergey Arzamasov (KAZ)
- 1999: Oleg Sakirkin (KAZ)
- 2003: Denis Saurambayev (KAZ)

=== Men's shot put ===
- 1995: Sergey Rubtsov (KAZ)
- 1997: Sergey Rubtsov (KAZ)
- 1999: Sergey Rubtsov (KAZ)
- 2003: Sergey Kot (UZB)

=== Men's discus throw ===
- 1995: Roman Poltoratsky (UZB)
- 1997: Yevgeniy Buchatskiy (KAZ)
- 1999: Roman Poltoratsky (UZB)
- 2003: Dmitriy Kondratenko (KAZ)

=== Men's hammer throw ===
- 1995: Andrey Abduvaliyev (TJK)
- 1997: Andrey Abduvaliyev (UZB)
- 1999: Andrey Abduvaliyev (UZB)
- 2003: Dilshod Nazarov (TJK)

=== Men's javelin throw ===
- 1995: Viktor Zaytsev (UZB)
- 1997: Sergey Voynov (UZB)
- 1999: Sergey Voynov (UZB)
- 2003: Rinat Tarzumanov (UZB)

=== Men's decathlon ===
- 1995: Dmitriy Zhestkov (UZB)
- 1997: Oleg Veretelnikov (UZB)
- 1999: Ivan Yarkin (KAZ)
- 2003: Not held

=== Men's 20 km walk ===
- 1995: Not held
- 1997: Valeriy Borisov (KAZ)
- 1999: Valeriy Borisov (KAZ)
- 2003: Valeriy Borisov (KAZ)

=== Men's 4 × 100 metres relay ===
- 1995: Uzbekistan (UZB)
- 1997: Kazakhstan (KAZ)
- 1999: Kazakhstan (KAZ)
- 2003: Kazakhstan (KAZ)

=== Men's 4 × 400 metres relay ===
- 1995: Uzbekistan (UZB)
- 1997: Uzbekistan (UZB)
- 1999: Kazakhstan (KAZ)
- 2003: Kazakhstan (KAZ)

=== Women's 100 metres ===
- 1995: Viktoriya Tokonbayeva (KAZ)
- 1997: Elena Bobrovskaya (KGZ)
- 1999: Olga Shishigina (KAZ)
- 2003: Guzel Khubbieva (UZB)

=== Women's 200 metres ===
- 1995: Svetlana Bodritskaya (KAZ)
- 1997: Svetlana Bodritskaya (KAZ)
- 1999: Natalya Vorobyeva (KAZ)
- 2003: Guzel Khubbieva (UZB)

=== Women's 400 metres ===
- 1995: Natalya Dorokhina (KAZ)
- 1997: Svetlana Bodritskaya (KAZ)
- 1999: Svetlana Bodritskaya (KAZ)
- 2003: Tatyana Roslanova (KAZ)

=== Women's 800 metres ===
- 1995: Oksana Ivashenko (KAZ)
- 1997: Marina Strakhova (KAZ)
- 1999: Oksana Ivashenko (KAZ)
- 2003: Tatyana Roslanova (KAZ)

=== Women's 1500 metres ===
- 1995: Irina Mikitenko (KAZ)
- 1997: Yelena Rezvanova (KAZ)
- 1999: Oksana Ivashenko (KAZ)
- 2003: Svetlana Lukasheva (KAZ)

=== Women's 5000 metres ===
- 1995: Yelena Rezvanova (KAZ)
- 1997: Irina Bogacheva (KGZ)
- 1999: Garifa Kuku (KAZ)
- 2003: Tatyana Borisova (KGZ)

=== Women's 10,000 metres ===
- 1995: Not held
- 1997: Not held
- 1999: Garifa Kuku (KAZ)
- 2003: Marina Gurbina (KAZ)

=== Women's 100 m hurdles ===
- 1995: Olga Shishigina (KAZ)
- 1997: Natalya Torshina-Alimzhanova (KAZ)
- 1999: Olga Shishigina (KAZ)
- 2003: Irina Karpova (KAZ)

=== Women's 400 m hurdles ===
- 1995: Natalya Torshina-Alimzhanova (KAZ)
- 1997: Natalya Torshina-Alimzhanova (KAZ)
- 1999: Irina Vedernikova (KAZ)
- 2003: Natalya Torshina-Alimzhanova (KAZ)

=== Women's high jump ===
- 1995: Svetlana Munkova (UZB)
- 1997: Oksana Mayboroda (KGZ)
- 1999: Svetlana Zalevskaya (KAZ)
- 2003: Marina Aitova (KAZ)

=== Women's long jump ===
- 1995: Yelena Pershina (KAZ)
- 1997: Yelena Pershina (KAZ)
- 1999: Elena Bobrovskaya (KGZ)
- 2003: Anastasiya Juravleva (UZB)

=== Women's triple jump ===
- 1995: Oksana Zelinskaya (KAZ)
- 1997: Oksana Zelinskaya (KAZ)
- 1999: Yelena Parfyonova (KAZ)
- 2003: Anastasiya Juravleva (UZB)

=== Women's shot put ===
- 1995: Yelena Baltabayeva (KAZ)
- 1997: Yelena Baltabayeva (KAZ)
- 1999: Iolanta Ulyeva (KAZ)
- 2003: Iolanta Ulyeva (KAZ)

=== Women's discus throw ===
- 1995: Yelena Radchenko (UZB)
- 1997: Iolanta Ulyeva (KAZ)
- 1999: Iolanta Ulyeva (KAZ)
- 2003: Olga Shukina (UZB)

=== Women's hammer throw ===
- 1995: Not held
- 1997: Not held
- 1999: Not held
- 2003: Olga Jogoleva (UZB)

=== Women's javelin throw ===
- 1995: Yelena Svezhentseva (UZB)
- 1997: Yelena Svezhentseva (UZB)
- 1999: Larisa Dedova (KGZ)
- 2003: Liliya Dusmetova (UZB)

=== Women's heptathlon ===
- 1995: Svetlana Mikhaylova (KAZ)
- 1997: Svetlana Kazanina (KAZ)
- 1999: Svetlana Kazanina (KAZ)
- 2003: Olga Rypakova (KAZ)

=== Women's 10 km walk ===
- 1995: Not held
- 1997: Svetlana Tolstaya (KAZ)
- 1999: Svetlana Tolstaya (KAZ)
- 2003: Not held

=== Women's 4 × 100 metres relay ===
- 1995: Kazakhstan (KAZ)
- 1997: Uzbekistan (UZB)
- 1999: Kazakhstan (KAZ)
- 2003: Uzbekistan (UZB)

=== Women's 4 × 400 metres relay ===
- 1995: Kazakhstan (KAZ)
- 1997: Kazakhstan (KAZ)
- 1999: Kyrgyzstan (KGZ)
- 2003: Kazakhstan (KAZ)
