= Olga Shishigina =

Kazakhstani hurdler (born 1968)

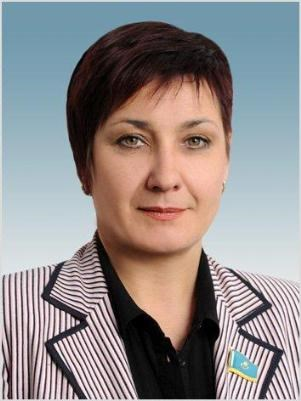
- 2020

Personal information
- Full name: Olga Vasilyevna Shishigina
- Citizenship: Kazakhstan
- Born: 23 December 1968 (age 57) Almaty, Kazakh SSR, Soviet Union
- Education: Republican School of Higher Sports Skills (1992–1994); Kazakh State Academy of Tourism and Sports (2002)
- Occupations: Service in the ranks of the Armed Forces of the Republic of Kazakhstan (1987–1992); Service in the National Security Committee of the Republic of Kazakhstan (1994–2013); Deputy of the Mazhilis of the Parliament of the Republic of Kazakhstan of the fifth convocation (22 January 2013 – 20 January 2016); Deputy of the Mazhilis of the Parliament of the Republic of Kazakhstan of the sixth convocation (25 March 2016-currently); Head of the Athletics Department of the Kazakh State Academy of Tourism and Sports (currently)
- Height: 1.65 m (5 ft 5 in)
- Weight: 57 kg (126 lb)
- Spouse: Dmitry Gridnev

Sport
- Sport: Hurdles
- Retired: 2007
Medal record
Representing Kazakhstan
Olympic Games
Gold medal – first place	2000 Sydney	100 m hurdles
World Championships
Silver medal – second place	1995 Gothenburg	100 m hurdles
Bronze medal – third place	2001 Edmonton	100 m hurdles
World Indoor Championships
Gold medal – first place	1999 Maebashi	60 m hurdles
Silver medal – second place	1995 Barcelona	60 m hurdles
Asian Championships
Gold medal – first place	1998 Fukuoka	100 m hurdles
Bronze medal – third place	1993 Manila	100 m hurdles
Asian Games
Gold medal – first place	1994 Hiroshima	100 m hurdles
Gold medal – first place	1998 Bangkok	100 m hurdles
Central Asian Games
Gold medal – first place	1995 Tashkent	100 m hurdles
Gold medal – first place	1999 Bishkek	100 m hurdles
Gold medal – first place	1999 Bishkek	100 m hurdles

Olga Vasilyevna Shishigina (Russian: Ольга Васильевна Шишигина; born 23 December 1968) is a retired Kazakhstani track and field athlete who mainly competed in the 100 metres hurdles. Honoured Master of Sports and the pride of Kazakhstan, which has won many medals in various competitions. She won an Olympic gold medal in 2000, and many medals on the regional and continental level. She is the only gold medalist in both the Championship and the Olympic Games in Athletics. Olga's first victory was at the Asian Games, which was held in Hiroshima in 1994. Shishigina was banned between 1996 and 1998 for failing a drug test. She holds the rank of Major in the Border Guard Service of Kazakhstan.

== Biography ==
At an early age, her parents sent their girl to the athletics section. She really enjoyed this type of sport, was fond of different running types and began to train hard every day. With the help of diligent training, she quickly entered the international level, where she competed with opponents from different countries. She is the only gold medalist in both the Championship and the Olympic Games in Athletics. Since then, she has won 8 first places, 2 silver and two thirds. She set an Asian record in the 100 m hurdles, covering the distance in 12.4 seconds. All her awards and orders are kept in a modest corner of the house. Olga Shishigina's sports career began with a victory at the 1994 Asian Games in Hiroshima, she also won silver medals at the 1995 Summer (Gothenburg) and Winter (Barcelona) World Championships; followed by gold at the 1999 World Indoor Championships (Maebashi, Japan) and an Olympic triumph in 2000 in Sydney. Shishigina Olga Vasilievna was born on 23 December 1968, in the city of Almaty. Despite the fact that she was loaded with training and competitions, she received higher education at the Kazakh State Academy of Tourism and Sports in 2002. Athlete, 2000 Sydney Olympic champion and indoor world champion in the 100 m hurdles. In 2000, at the 27th Summer Olympics in Sydney, on the 13th day of the competition, she first fell behind, then caught up and finished first. She noticed that her mistake was that she stuck too long at the start. However, most of the opponents quickly run through the first half and suffocate at the end. Olga, on the contrary, began to run better only in the second half. In an interview, she noted that she felt pride in patriotism and the enthusiastic echoes of her compatriots from the podium during the competition, and this gave her more motivation to win. Olga always says that she never gets bored of photos with fans and that she does not suffer from star fever like many winners. However, her husband doesn't like when fans try to hug and kiss her.

At an early age, Olga's mom noticed how her daughter was fond of running. As a child, Olga behaved like a tomboy, played only with boys and always dressed like a boy, as the dresses didn't catch on to her. At the age of 7, a coach noticed her passion for sports and began to turn her into a future champion. Since childhood, she has been keen on simple and obstacle courses. When Olga was 10 she got into the Olympic reserve and at 19 when she entered the national team of the Union, she unexpectedly got married. Olga managed to taste the flavour of marriage life and give birth to a son. In the late 80s, the girl began to experience a recession in physical terms, which is why she temporarily left the performances and focused on gaining the optimal form. Since childhood, she was famous among boys and went on dates a lot. But accepted only Dmitry who is now her husband. For almost a month she received flowers from him anonymously (until she knew who the sender was), then he got her heart. If she is the most daring woman at competitions, then at home she is very homely and hospitable. Her motto for life: "Family comes first, sport comes second." With her husband, she raised a son, who, in turn, is also interested in sports, but does not plan to do this on a professional level. Just like most women she often mentions how much she enjoys spending time with her family. In almost all interviews she does not get tired of claiming that her victories are the merit of her husband - Dmitry Gridnev, since because of the competition, she dumped all household life on his shoulders, and withstood fatherhood in her opinion with dignity (took care of her son and home in her absence);

She managed to achieve success in the 90s. In 1993 she took bronze at the Asian Championships, and a few months later she took gold. Since then, she has won eight first places, 2 silver and two thirds. Her last performance was at a tournament in Edmonton, after which she retired due to earned injuries. Except for sports she likes to cook in her spare time and this is her hobby since the age of 15. She mainly likes to cook various dishes where there are a lot of apples, such as apple pie, buns, cakes etc. The main characters which helped her to become a champion are her braveness, persistence and leadership skills. The coach said about her that she always went to victory with the tenacity of a small tank (in a loving way). The Germans noted that she had diamond technique since she jumped so clearly. After her career as an athlete was completed, she wanted to return to the sports as a coach and realized that it was necessary to teach future champions in athletics from childhood. However, the wind of change blew from Astana and in 2016 she became a deputy of the Mazhilis of the Parliament of the Republic of Kazakhstan of the sixth convocation, a member of the People's Democratic Party "Nur Otan" according to the party-list election. She also mentioned that some of her future dreams are to help veterans and future champions, raise Olympic pensions and build schools for aspiring athletes. Due to her retirement from sports, she was confused and didn't know where to work or how to continue a normal life. She tried to realize herself in something else. She tried herself at an apartment works, built a house at her grandmother's country house.

== Achievements ==
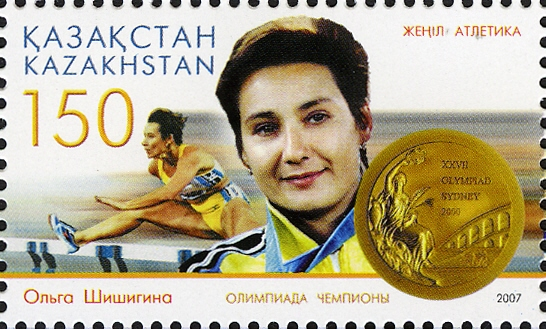
A stamp from Kazakhstan honoring Shishigina for her victory at the 2000 Summer Olympics

Year	Competition	Venue	Position	Hurdles	Note
1994	XII Asian Games	Hiroshima, Japan	1st	100 m hurdles	12.8
1995	5th World Championships in Athletics	Gothenburg, Sweden	2nd	100 m hurdles	12.8
1995	5th IAAF World Indoor Championships in Athletics	Barcelona, Spain	2nd	60 m hurdles	7.92
1998	XIII Asian Games	Bangkok, Thailand	1st	100 metres hurdles	12.63
1999	7th IAAF World Indoor Championships in Athletics	Maebashi, Japan	1st	60 m hurdles	7.86
2000	Games of the XXVII Olympiad	Sydney, Australia	1st	100 m hurdles	12.65

== Honors ==
- 1994—Master of sports of international class;
- 1999 — Order of Kurmet;
- 1999 — Honored Master of Sports of the Republic of Kazakhstan in athletics.
- 2000 (12 December) — Order "Barys" I degree;
- 2000 (27 December) — State Youth Prize "Daryn";
- 2005 (12 December) — Order "Dostyk" 2nd degree;

Government medals:

- Medal "20 years of the Constitution of the Republic of Kazakhstan" (2015);
- Medal "25 years of the independence of the Republic of Kazakhstan" (2016);
- Medal "20 years of Astana" (2018);
- Medal "25 years of the Constitution of the Republic of Kazakhstan" (2020);

== Personal bests ==
On open air
Event	Time	Date	Venue	Note
100 m hurdles	12.44	27 June 1995	Lucerne, Switzerland	Asian record
100 m	11.13	27 May 2000	Almaty, Kazakhstan	

Indoors
Event	Time	Date	Venue	Note
60 m	7.33	17 February 2002	Birmingham, England	
50 m hurdles	6.70	5 February 1999	Budapest, Hungary	Asian record
60 m hurdles	7.82	21 February 1999	Liévin, France	Asian record

Sporting positions
Preceded by Tatyana Reshetnykova; Svetla Dimitrova	Women's 100 m Hurdles Best Year Performance; 1995	Succeeded by Ludmila Engquist
