= Athletics at the 1999 Summer Universiade – Men's javelin throw =

The men's javelin throw event at the 1999 Summer Universiade was held at the Estadio Son Moix in Palma de Mallorca, Spain on 11 and 13 July.

== Medalists ==
Gold	Silver	Bronze
Ēriks Rags; Latvia	Gregor Högler; Austria	Isbel Luaces; Cuba

== Results ==
=== Qualification ===
Qualification: 76.00 (Q) or at least 12 best performers (q) advance to the final

Rank	Group	Athlete	Nationality	Result	Notes
1	A	Emeterio González	Cuba	82.76	Q, SB
2	A	Ēriks Rags	Latvia	80.04	Q
3	B	Gregor Högler	Austria	79.20	Q
4	A	Esko Mikkola	Finland	76.37	Q
5	B	Isbel Luaces	Cuba	76.24	Q
6	B	Johan Vosloo	South Africa	75.44	q
7	A	Johannes van Eck	South Africa	75.09	q
8	A	Alberto Desiderio	Italy	74.40	q
9	B	Nick Nieland	Great Britain	73.44	q
10	A	Christian Fusenig	Germany	73.28	q
11	B	Diego Moraga	Chile	71.21	q
12	B	Yu Nam-sung	South Korea	71.13	q
13	A	Breaux Greer	United States	70.86	
14	B	Daniel Gustavsson	Sweden	70.41	
15	A	Daniel Ragnvaldsson	Sweden	70.34	
16	B	Heiko Väät	Estonia	70.20	
17	B	Zanis Silarajs	Latvia	70.01	
18	A	Richard Knudsen	Denmark	68.93	
19	B	Darin File	United States	67.35	
20	B	Yoji Kinose	Japan	66.73	
21	A	Dmitriy Shnayder	Kyrgyzstan	65.94	
22	A	Thomas Madibela	Botswana	60.78	
23	B	Bogdan Vrhovec	Slovenia	60.17	
24	A	Charlie Saad	Lebanon	50.97	
	B	Gergely Horváth	Hungary	DNS	

=== Final ===
Rank	Athlete	Nationality	#1	#2	#3	#4	#5	#6	Result	Notes
1st place, gold medalist(s)	Ēriks Rags	Latvia	79.61	83.78	x	75.68	x	x	83.78	PB
2nd place, silver medalist(s)	Gregor Högler	Austria							82.63	SB
3rd place, bronze medalist(s)	Isbel Luaces	Cuba							82.18	PB
4	Emeterio González	Cuba							80.73	
5	Nick Nieland	Great Britain							80.16	SB
6	Johan Vosloo	South Africa							77.91	
7	Alberto Desiderio	Italy							77.07	
8	Esko Mikkola	Finland							75.30	
9	Johannes van Eck	South Africa							74.27	
10	Christian Fusenig	Germany							74.03	
11	Diego Moraga	Chile							67.79	
12	Yu Nam-sung	South Korea							66.27	
