= Athletics at the 2002 Asian Games – Men's javelin throw =

Men's javelin throw at the 2002 Asian Games
- Venue: Busan Asiad Main Stadium
- Date: 12 October 2002
- Competitors: 11 from 8 nations

Medalists
gold medal	Li Rongxiang	China
silver medal	Yukifumi Murakami	Japan
bronze medal	Sergey Voynov	Uzbekistan

The men's javelin throw competition at the 2002 Asian Games in Busan, South Korea was held on 12 October at the Busan Asiad Main Stadium.

== Schedule ==
All times are Korea Standard Time (UTC+09:00)

Date	Time	Event
Saturday, 12 October 2002	16:00	Final

== Records ==
Prior to this competition, the existing world, Asian and Games records were as follows.

World Record	Jan Železný (CZE)	98.48	Jena, Germany	25 May 1996
Asian Record	Kazuhiro Mizoguchi (JPN)	87.60	San Jose, United States	27 May 1989
Games Record	Zhang Lianbiao (CHN)	83.38	Hiroshima, Japan	16 October 1994

== Results ==
Legend

- NM — No mark

Rank	Athlete	Attempt						Result	Notes
Rank	Athlete	1	2	3	4	5	6	Result	Notes
1st place, gold medalist(s)	Li Rongxiang (CHN)	81.12	82.21	80.73	X	82.06	X	82.21	
2nd place, silver medalist(s)	Yukifumi Murakami (JPN)	78.77	77.23	X	X	—	X	78.77	
3rd place, bronze medalist(s)	Sergey Voynov (UZB)	78.74	X	X	X	X	77.66	78.74	
4	Park Jae-myong (KOR)	X	X	75.66	76.57	76.28	78.27	78.27	
5	Chu Ki-young (KOR)	76.91	X	76.84	X	X	X	76.91	
6	Harminder Singh (IND)	73.97	75.92	70.97	75.93	73.26	74.54	75.93	
7	Mohamed Al-Khulaifi (QAT)	68.78	70.40	X	69.41	X	X	70.40	
8	Firas Al-Mahamid (SYR)	69.16	70.08	70.25	X	X	X	70.25	
9	Ali Al-Jadani (KSA)	X	69.84	69.68				69.84	
10	Hamad Khalifa Jabir (QAT)	64.91	69.44	X				69.44	
—	Chen Qi (CHN)	X	X	—				NM	
