= 2000 Asian Athletics Championships – Men's javelin throw =

The men's javelin throw event at the 2000 Asian Athletics Championships was held in Jakarta, Indonesia on 30 August.

== Results ==
Rank	Name	Nationality	#1	#2	#3	#4	#5	#6	Result	Notes
1st place, gold medalist(s)	Jagdish Singh Bishnoi	India	x	76.81	x	71.27	71.71	–	76.81	
2nd place, silver medalist(s)	Chu Ki-Young	South Korea	x	71.96	75.27	70.56	72.25	72.51	75.27	
3rd place, bronze medalist(s)	Sun Shipeng	China	72.10	70.30	70.53	70.80	74.34	72.59	74.34	
4	Firass Al-Mohamed	Syria							73.42	
5	Toru Ue	Japan							71.27	
6	Song Dong-Hyun	South Korea							70.76	
7	Ali Saleh Al-Jadani	Saudi Arabia							70.76	
8	Thirdsak Boonjansri	Thailand							69.80	
9	Mohamed Ibrahim Al-Khalifa	Qatar							67.55	
10	Dmitriy Shnayder	Kyrgyzstan							67.25	
11	Wu Po-Hung	Chinese Taipei							65.82	
12	Mehdi Ghavasi	Iran							64.78	
13	Ahmad Abou Jalala	Qatar							63.83	
14	Ponsianus Kahol	Indonesia							61.45	
	Adel Salem Saeed	United Arab Emirates	x	–	–				NM	
