= Yu Nam-sung =

South Korean javelin thrower

Personal information
- Born: 3 October 1978 (age 48)

Sport
- Sport: Track and field

Yu Nam-sung (born 3 October 1978) is a retired South Korean javelin thrower.

He won the 1997 Asian Junior Championships, and became South Korean champion once—in 1999—before Park Jae-Myong started a lengthy winning streak. He finished fifth at the 1998 Asian Games and twelfth at the 1999 Summer Universiade. He also competed at the 1999 World Championships without reaching the final.

His personal best time was 79.84 metres, achieved in April 1998 in Youngju.
