= 1997 European Athletics U23 Championships – Men's javelin throw =

The men's javelin throw event at the 1997 European Athletics U23 Championships was held in Turku, Finland, on 13 July 1997.

== Medalists ==
Gold	Pietami Skyttä; Finland
Silver	Matti Närhi; Finland
Bronze	Christian Nicolay; Germany

== Results ==
=== Final ===
13 July

Rank	Name	Nationality	Attempts						Result	Notes
Rank	Name	Nationality	1	2	3	4	5	6	Result	Notes
1st place, gold medalist(s)	Pietami Skyttä	Finland	78.72	78.00	x	81.58	x	x	81.58	
2nd place, silver medalist(s)	Matti Närhi	Finland	79.64	x	x	80.72	x	79.46	80.72	
3rd place, bronze medalist(s)	Christian Nicolay	Germany	x	74.80	72.16	75.16	78.18	76.56	78.18	
4	Ēriks Rags	Latvia	70.98	73.48	76.46	75.54	78.12	74.82	78.12	
5	Igor Lisovskiy	Belarus	x	77.36	77.72	74.86	71.98	75.70	77.72	
6	Laurent Dorique	France	74.84	74.14	70.18	74.56	x	72.32	74.84	
7	Dominique Pausé	France	x	66.16	73.70	x	x	x	73.70	
8	Stuart Faben	Great Britain	72.96	72.10	71.58	72.84	x	x	72.96	
9	Vladimir Chizhov	Russia	69.36	72.60	71.72				72.60	
10	Mats Nilsson	Sweden	71.76	x	69.36				71.76	
11	Daniel Daub	Germany	70.72	70.68	68.72				70.72	
12	Gergely Horváth	Hungary	66.84	70.02	69.36				70.02	
13	Andrey Khodasevich	Belarus	x	x	67.86				67.86	
14	Daniel Gustafsson	Sweden	65.68	66.48	66.54				66.54	
15	Gürbüz Çam	Turkey	62.58	62.08	59.40				62.58	

== Participation ==
According to an unofficial count, 15 athletes from 10 countries participated in the event.

- Belarus (2)
- Finland (2)
- France (2)
- Germany (2)
- Great Britain (1)
- Hungary (1)
- Latvia (1)
- Russia (1)
- Sweden (2)
- Turkey (1)
