= Athletics at the 2006 Asian Games – Men's javelin throw =

Asian Games Athletics competition

Men's javelin throw at the 2006 Asian Games
- Venue: Khalifa International Stadium
- Date: 12 December 2006
- Competitors: 17 from 13 nations

Medalists
gold medal	Park Jae-myong	South Korea
silver medal	Yukifumi Murakami	Japan
bronze medal	Li Rongxiang	China

The men's javelin throw competition at the 2006 Asian Games in Doha, Qatar was held on 12 December 2006 at the Khalifa International Stadium.

== Schedule ==
All times are Arabia Standard Time (UTC+03:00)

Date	Time	Event
Tuesday, 12 December 2006	16:25	Final

== Records ==
Prior to this competition, the existing world, Asian and Games records were as follows.

World Record	Jan Železný (CZE)	98.48	Jena, Germany	25 May 1996
Asian Record	Kazuhiro Mizoguchi (JPN)	87.60	San Jose, United States	27 May 1989
Games Record	Zhang Lianbiao (CHN)	83.38	Hiroshima, Japan	16 October 1994

== Results ==
Legend

- DNS — Did not start

Rank	Athlete	Attempt						Result	Notes
Rank	Athlete	1	2	3	4	5	6	Result	Notes
1st place, gold medalist(s)	Park Jae-myong (KOR)	76.92	79.16	79.30	X	X	76.46	79.30	
2nd place, silver medalist(s)	Yukifumi Murakami (JPN)	68.25	78.15	75.14	X	69.60	74.75	78.15	
3rd place, bronze medalist(s)	Li Rongxiang (CHN)	75.96	76.13	X	X	X	72.87	76.13	
4	Chen Qi (CHN)	X	75.75	75.26	71.43	74.08	76.13	76.13	
5	Mohamed Al-Khulaifi (QAT)	66.26	67.75	63.94	70.45	X	70.09	70.45	
6	Firas Al-Mahamid (SYR)	69.30	69.81	66.87	66.14	64.87	66.37	69.81	
7	Chu Ki-young (KOR)	68.15	X	66.78	—	65.44	X	68.15	
8	Hamad Khalifa Jabir (QAT)	67.08	67.42	67.47	X	63.83	62.07	67.47	
9	Sergey Voynov (UZB)	X	66.06	66.89				66.89	
10	Danilo Fresnido (PHI)	64.10	64.89	66.11				66.11	
11	Ali Al-Jadani (KSA)	66.02	61.21	61.05				66.02	
12	Ammar Makki (IRQ)	61.54	60.30	65.22				65.22	
13	Harshana Kingsley (SRI)	62.88	64.94	64.07				64.94	
14	Abdullah Al-Ameeri (KUW)	60.49	59.35	63.75				63.75	
15	Chou Yi-chen (TPE)	X	63.47	X				63.47	
16	Khamis Al-Qutaiti (OMA)	X	59.60	X				59.60	
—	Wissam Shelal (IRQ)							DNS	
