= 1994 World Junior Championships in Athletics – Men's javelin throw =

The men's javelin throw event at the 1994 World Junior Championships in Athletics was held in Lisbon, Portugal, at Estádio Universitário de Lisboa on 22 and 24 July.

== Medalists ==
Gold	Marius Corbett; South Africa
Silver	Matti Närhi; Finland
Bronze	Isbel Luaces; Cuba

== Results ==
=== Final ===
24 July

Rank	Name	Nationality	Attempts						Result	Notes
Rank	Name	Nationality	1	2	3	4	5	6	Result	Notes
1st place, gold medalist(s)	Marius Corbett	South Africa	x	74.04	77.98	77.54	76.80	77.14	77.98	
2nd place, silver medalist(s)	Matti Närhi	Finland	62.38	70.64	x	64.32	68.36	74.92	74.92	
3rd place, bronze medalist(s)	Isbel Luaces	Cuba	x	66.38	68.20	x	72.82	70.46	72.82	
4	Sergey Voynov	Uzbekistan	72.74	57.96	58.66	66.16	69.30	69.60	72.74	
5	Christian Nicolay	Germany	67.82	72.48	71.58	70.92	70.24	x	72.48	
6	Pietari Skyttä	Finland	66.38	66.90	x	65.24	68.10	72.06	72.06	
7	Toru Ue	Japan	x	69.48	x	65.02	x	x	69.48	
8	Kiyoshi Ishiba	Japan	64.44	68.56	65.56	x	x	68.46	68.56	
9	Mats Nilsson	Sweden	66.10	64.96	65.30				66.10	
10	Tómas Halva	Slovakia	65.00	65.18	65.28				65.28	
11	Marcos Vieira	Brazil	60.38	64.92	x				64.92	
12	Róbert Srovnal	Czech Republic	x	64.44	x				64.44	

=== Qualifications ===
22 Jul

==== Group A ====
Rank	Name	Nationality	Attempts			Result	Notes
Rank	Name	Nationality	1	2	3	Result	Notes
1	Marius Corbett	South Africa	73.26	-	-	73.26	Q
2	Toru Ue	Japan	67.88	71.82	-	71.82	Q
3	Christian Nicolay	Germany	67.90	71.60	-	71.60	Q
4	Tómas Halva	Slovakia	70.18	-	-	70.18	Q
5	Pietari Skyttä	Finland	60.44	63.54	69.24	69.24	q
6	Mats Nilsson	Sweden	66.46	65.72	68.10	68.10	q
7	Ali Al-Jadani	Saudi Arabia	66.52	x	67.68	67.68	
8	Hur Sung-Min	South Korea	67.34	67.38	61.62	67.38	
9	Steven Madeo	Australia	63.92	63.38	64.36	64.36	
10	José Manuel Hermoso	Spain	63.84	x	64.10	64.10	
11	Vasiliy Skrylyov	Russia	60.10	62.78	64.04	64.04	
12	Miao Lianjin	China	x	63.08	63.58	63.58	
13	Dorel Gretea	Romania	60.28	63.46	x	63.00	
14	Ēriks Rags	Latvia	60.52	x	58.28	60.52	
15	Frédéric Caulier	France	x	60.02	x	60.02	

==== Group B ====
Rank	Name	Nationality	Attempts			Result	Notes
Rank	Name	Nationality	1	2	3	Result	Notes
1	Róbert Srovnal	Czech Republic	73.48	-	-	73.48	Q
2	Sergey Voynov	Uzbekistan	72.92	-	-	72.92	Q
3	Kiyoshi Ishiba	Japan	68.48	65.26	71.72	71.72	Q
4	Matti Närhi	Finland	70.88	-	-	70.88	Q
5	Isbel Luaces	Cuba	70.44	-	-	70.44	Q
6	Marcos Vieira	Brazil	68.26	63.74	x	68.26	q
7	Stuart Faben	United Kingdom	66.74	64.76	65.18	66.74	
8	Dominique Pause	France	66.68	66.50	x	66.68	
9	Johan Kloeck	Belgium	60.98	60.02	66.10	66.10	
10	Aleksandr Kuznetsov	Russia	61.80	65.64	62.02	65.64	
11	Bojan Ilic	Yugoslavia	63.00	61.18	65.12	65.12	
12	Shane Wylie	Australia	64.94	x	x	64.94	
13	Kai Kaufmann	Germany	64.38	x	x	64.38	
14	Ozie Duncan	United States	61.76	62.14	59.94	62.14	
15	Sandijs Lieknins	Latvia	x	55.20	58.42	58.42	
	Donny Magnan	Seychelles	x	x	-	NM	

== Participation ==
According to an unofficial count, 31 athletes from 24 countries participated in the event.

- Australia (2)
- Belgium (1)
- Brazil (1)
- China (1)
- Cuba (1)
- Czech Republic (1)
- Finland (2)
- France (2)
- Germany (2)
- Japan (2)
- Latvia (2)
- Romania (1)
- Russia (2)
- Saudi Arabia (1)
- Seychelles (1)
- Slovakia (1)
- South Africa (1)
- South Korea (1)
- Spain (1)
- Sweden (1)
- United Kingdom (1)
- United States (1)
- Uzbekistan (1)
- Yugoslavia (1)
