= 2002 Asian Athletics Championships – Men's javelin throw =

The men's javelin throw event at the 2002 Asian Athletics Championships was held in Colombo, Sri Lanka on 11 August.

== Results ==
Rank	Name	Nationality	Result	Notes
1st place, gold medalist(s)	Li Rongxiang	China	82.75	SB
2nd place, silver medalist(s)	Sergey Voynov	Uzbekistan	79.70	
3rd place, bronze medalist(s)	Park Jae-Myong	South Korea	79.22	
4	Jagdish Bishnoi	India	78.92	SB
5	Chou Yi-Chen	Chinese Taipei	72.52	
6	Mohamed Ibrahim Al-Khalifa	Qatar	72.21	
7	Firas Zaal Al-Mohammed	Syria	69.83	
8	Mohd Fazal Ansari	India	69.59	
9	Shiro Shiraiwa	Japan	68.37	
10	Chiang Wan-Hsing	Chinese Taipei	66.24	
11	Pradeep Nishantha	Sri Lanka	65.73	
12	Zahid Mahmood Hussain	Pakistan	65.55	
13	P.K. Aluvihare	Sri Lanka	63.65	PB
14	Dmitriy Shnayder	Kyrgyzstan	63.28	
15	Chandimal Thilakaratne	Sri Lanka	62.99	SB
16	Khurshed Ahmad Khan	Nepal	62.06	SB
17	Hamad Al-Khalifa	Qatar	61.79	
18	Dandy Gallenero	Philippines	60.20	SB
19	Kyaw Swar Moe	Myanmar	59.82	SB
