= Athletics at the 1997 Summer Universiade – Men's javelin throw =

The men's javelin throw event at the 1997 Summer Universiade was held at the Stadio Cibali in Catania, Italy, on 27 and 28 August.

== Medalists ==
Gold	Silver	Bronze
Marius Corbett; South Africa	Emeterio González; Cuba	Gregor Högler; Austria

== Results ==
=== Qualification ===
Rank	Group	Athlete	Nationality	Result	Notes
1	?	Emeterio González	Cuba	81.78	
2	?	Gregor Högler	Austria	76.44	
3	?	Alberto Desiderio	Italy	73.62	
4	?	Toru Ue	Japan	73.40	
5	?	Marius Corbett	South Africa	73.36	
6	?	Johannes van Eck	South Africa	72.62	
7	?	Chu Ki-young	South Korea	72.40	
8	?	Nick Nieland	Great Britain	71.72	
9	?	Tommi Viskari	Finland	71.62	
10	?	Luiz Fernando da Silva	Brazil	71.40	
11	?	Ēriks Rags	Latvia	71.08	
12	?	Dominique Pausé	France	70.22	
13	?	Mark Fletcher	United States	69.32	
14	?	Breaux Greer	United States	69.20	
15	?	Robi Teršek	Slovenia	69.14	
16	?	Richard Brockett	Australia	68.78	
17	?	Diego Moraga	Chile	68.06	
18	?	Heiko Väät	Estonia	67.36	
19	?	Goran Bošnjak	Yugoslavia	66.24	
20	?	Laurent Dorique	France	65.90	
21	?	Jorge Quiñones	Peru	64.94	
22	A	Raimundo Fernández	Spain	62.90	
23	?	Dejan Angelovski	Macedonia	62.68	
24	?	Lin Yung-ching	Chinese Taipei	59.64	

=== Final ===
Rank	Athlete	Nationality	Result	Notes
1st place, gold medalist(s)	Marius Corbett	South Africa	86.50	
2nd place, silver medalist(s)	Emeterio González	Cuba	83.48	
3rd place, bronze medalist(s)	Gregor Högler	Austria	81.12	
4	Alberto Desiderio	Italy	77.42	
5	Nick Nieland	Great Britain	76.06	
6	Ēriks Rags	Latvia	74.84	
7	Toru Ue	Japan	74.32	
8	Chu Ki-young	South Korea	72.34	
9	Johannes van Eck	South Africa	72.18	
10	Luiz Fernando da Silva	Brazil	72.06	
11	Tommi Viskari	Finland	71.06	
12	Dominique Pausé	France	70.22	
