= Boue =

Boue may refer to:

- Boué, a commune in the Aisne department of France
- Ami Boué, Austrian geologist
- Anier Boué (born 1984), Cuban javelin thrower
- Stella Boué (1836–1925), French writer and feminist
- Valentine Boué (1898–1978), French writer and artist

== See also ==
- Bouès, a tributary of the Arros in France
