= Matti Närhi =

Finnish javelin thrower

Juha Matti Närhi (born 17 August 1975 in Viitasaari) is a Finnish javelin thrower.

His personal best throw is 88.24 metres, achieved in July 1997 in Soini.

He is the world indoor best holder at javelin; on March 3, 1996, he threw 85.78 in Kajaani, Finland.

Representing the UTEP Miners track and field program, Närhi won the 1999 NCAA Division I javelin title.

== Achievements ==
Year	Competition	Venue	Position	Notes
Representing Finland
1993	European Junior Championships	San Sebastián, Spain	2nd	71.74 m
1994	World Junior Championships	Lisbon, Portugal	2nd	74.92 m
1997	European U23 Championships	Turku, Finland	2nd	80.72 m
1998	European Championships	Budapest, Hungary	8th	82.59 m
1999	World Championships	Seville, Spain	12th	79.47 m
2001	World Championships	Edmonton, Canada	—	NM
2004	Olympic Games	Athens, Greece	10th	80.28 m

== Seasonal bests by year ==
- 1991 - 57.40
- 1992 - 70.24
- 1993 - 73.18
- 1994 - 76.14
- 1995 - 83.14
- 1996 - 84.42
- 1997 - 88.24
- 1998 - 84.38
- 1999 - 87.88
- 2000 - 82.74
- 2001 - 84.21
- 2003 - 77.30
- 2004 - 86.61
