= Marius Corbett =

South African javelin thrower

Personal information
- Born: 26 September 1975 (age 50)
Medal record
Men's athletics
Representing South Africa
World Championships
Gold medal – first place	1997 Athens	Javelin
African Championships
Gold medal – first place	1998 Dakar	Javelin
Commonwealth Games
Gold medal – first place	1998 Kuala Lumpur	Javelin
Universiade
Gold medal – first place	1997 Catania	Javelin
World Junior Championships
Gold medal – first place	1994 Lisbon	Javelin

Marius Corbett (born 26 September 1975 in Potchefstroom) is a South African javelin thrower. He won a gold medal at the 1997 World Championships in Athletics, improving his personal best by 4.50 m during the contest. The following year he threw 88.75 m (291 ft 2 in) to win the 1998 Commonwealth Games, which was the Commonwealth Games Record until Arshad Nadeem threw 90.18 m in 2022 and was also the African record until Julius Yego's throw of 91.39 m on 7 June 2015 in Birmingham.

== Seasonal bests by year ==
- 1993 - 73.00
- 1994 - 77.98
- 1996 - 74.94
- 1997 - 88.40
- 1998 - 88.75
- 1999 - 87.17
- 2000 - 83.43
- 2001 - 80.91
- 2004 - 70.17

== International competitions ==
Year	Competition	Venue	Position	Notes
Representing South Africa
1994	African Junior Championships	Algiers, Algeria	1st	74.42 m
1994	World Junior Championships	Lisbon, Portugal	1st	77.98 m
1997	World Championships	Athens, Greece	1st	88.40 m
1997	Universiade	Catania, Italy	1st	86.50 m
1998	African Championships	Dakar, Senegal	1st	79.82 m
1998	Commonwealth Games	Kuala Lumpur, Malaysia	1st	88.75 m GR
1999	World Championships	Seville, Spain	22nd (q)	76.34 m
1999	All-Africa Games	Johannesburg, South Africa	1st	78.74 m
