= Chen Qi (javelin thrower) =

Chinese javelin thrower (born 1982)

Medal record

Men's athletics

Representing China

Asian Championships
Gold medal – first place	2007 Amman	Javelin throw

Chen Qi (born 10 March 1982 in Shanghai) is a Chinese javelin thrower.

He finished fourth at the 2006 IAAF World Cup and the 2006 Asian Games and won the 2007 Asian Championships. He won the gold medal at the 11th Chinese National Games in 2009.

His personal best throw is 81.38 metres, achieved in May 2004 in Shijiazhuang.

== Achievements ==
Year	Competition	Venue	Position	Notes
Representing China
2000	World Junior Championships	Santiago, Chile	13th (q)	67.65 m
2001	Asian Junior Championships	Bandar Seri Begawan, Brunei	1st	77.22 m
2002	Asian Games	Busan, South Korea	–	NM
2005	Asian Championships	Incheon, South Korea	7th	74.37 m
2005	East Asian Games	Macau	2nd	76.96 m
2006	Asian Games	Doha, Qatar	4th	76.13 m
2007	Asian Championships	Amman, Jordan	1st	78.07 m
2008	Olympic Games	Beijing, China	23rd (q)	73.50 m
2011	Asian Championships	Kobe, Japan	5th	78.40 m
2011	World Championships	Daegu, South Korea	18th (q)	78.42 m

== Seasonal bests by year ==
- 2000 - 77.88
- 2001 - 77.89
- 2002 - 77.72
- 2003 - 77.32
- 2004 - 81.38
- 2005 - 79.31
- 2006 - 80.30
- 2007 - 78.07
- 2008 - 79.25
- 2009 - 79.57
- 2010 - 78.65
- 2011 - 80.76
- 2012 - 77.78
- 2013 - 75.88
