= Bobur Shokirjonov =

Uzbekistani javelin thrower

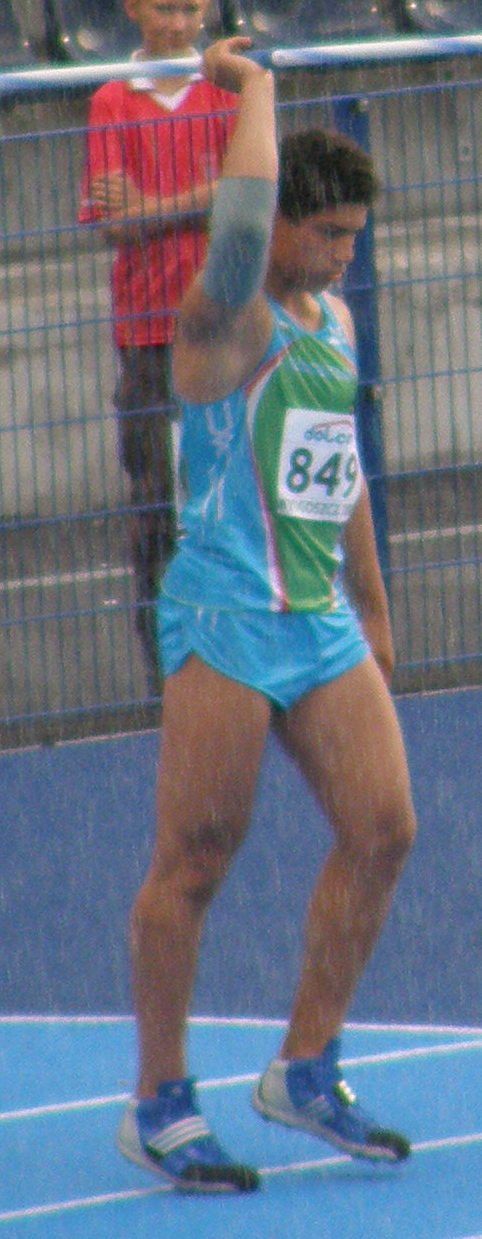
- Bobur Shokirjonov in 2008

Personal information
- Nationality: Uzbekistan
- Born: 5 December 1990 (age 35) Tashkent, Uzbek SSR, Soviet Union
- Height: 1.96 m (6 ft 5 in)
- Weight: 108 kg (238 lb)

Sport
- Sport: Athletics
- Event: Javelin throw

Achievements and titles
- Personal best: Javelin throw: 84.24 m (2015)

Bobur Shokirjonov (or Babur Shakirdzhanov, Uzbek: Бoбур Шoкиржoнов; born December 5, 1990, in Tashkent) is an Uzbekistani javelin thrower. He achieved a sixth-place finish at the 2008 IAAF World Junior Championships in Bydgoszcz, Poland.

At age seventeen, Shokirjonov made his official debut for the 2008 Summer Olympics in Beijing, where he competed in the men's javelin throw. He placed thirty-third overall in the qualifying rounds, with a throw of 69.54 metres.

== Competition record ==
Year	Competition	Venue	Position	Event	Notes
Representing Uzbekistan
2007	World Youth Championships	Ostrava, Czech Republic	1st	Javelin (700g)	96.93 m
2008	Asian Junior Championships	Jakarta, Indonesia	1st	Javelin	66.03 m
2008	World Junior Championships	Bydgoszcz, Poland	6th	Javelin	71.66 m
2008	Olympic Games	Beijing, China	33rd (q)	Javelin	69.54 m
2009	Asian Championships	Guangzhou, China	10th	Javelin	69.14 m
2010	Asian Games	Guangzhou, China	14th	Javelin	66.02 m
2011	Asian Championships	Kobe, Japan	9th	Javelin	69.81 m
2013	Asian Championships	Pune, India	6th	Javelin	72.64 m
2014	Asian Games	Incheon, South Korea	7th	Javelin	76.34 m
2015	Asian Championships	Wuhan, China	2nd	Javelin	79.09 m
2015	Universiade	Gwangju, South Korea	1st	Javelin	69.78 m
2016	Olympic Games	Rio de Janeiro, Brazil	–	Javelin	NM
2017	Asian Championships	Bhubaneswar, India	9th	Javelin	75.34 m

== Seasonal bests by year ==
- 2008 - 78.92
- 2009 - 79.31
- 2010 - 74.73
- 2011 - 78.39
- 2012 - 77.65
- 2013 - 77.50
- 2014 - 79.83
- 2015 - 84.24
- 2016 - 74.96
