= 2003 Asian Athletics Championships – Men's javelin throw =

The men's javelin throw event at the 2003 Asian Athletics Championships was held in Manila, Philippines on September 22.

== Results ==
Rank	Name	Nationality	Result	Notes
1st place, gold medalist(s)	Li Rongxiang	China	79.25	
2nd place, silver medalist(s)	Yukifumi Murakami	Japan	77.04	
3rd place, bronze medalist(s)	Sergey Voynov	Uzbekistan	76.09	
4	Park Jae-Myong	South Korea	74.37	
5	Yasutaka Fujiwara	Japan	72.55	
6	Rinat Tarzumanov	Uzbekistan	71.35	
7	Mehdi Ravaei	Iran	67.05	
8	Pradeep Nishantha	Sri Lanka	65.17	
9	Dandy Gallenero	Philippines	64.60	
10	Danilo Fresnido	Philippines	62.60	
