= Christian Nicolay =

German javelin thrower (born 1976)

Christian Nicolay (born 4 March 1976 in Bassenheim) is a German javelin thrower. His personal best throw is 84.54 metres, achieved in May 2003 in Dessau.

== Achievements ==
| Year | Competition | Venue | Position | Notes |
Representing Germany
| 1994 | World Junior Championships | Lisbon, Portugal | 5th | 72.48 m |
| 1995 | European Junior Championships | Nyíregyháza, Hungary | 1st | 76.88 m |
| 1997 | European U23 Championships | Turku, Finland | 3rd | 78.18 m |
| 2003 | World Championships | Paris, France | 6th | 81.77 m |
| 2003 | World Athletics Final | Monte Carlo, Monaco | 7th | 77.02 m |
| 2004 | Olympic Games | Athens, Greece | 16th | 79.77 m |
| 2005 | World Championships | Helsinki, Finland | 14th | 76.68 m |
| 2006 | European Championships | Gothenburg, Sweden | 14th | 77.94 m |

== Seasonal bests by year ==
- 1994 - 72.48
- 1999 - 78.23
- 2000 - 80.19
- 2002 - 81.90
- 2003 - 84.54
- 2004 - 83.02
- 2005 - 83.20
- 2006 - 83.72
- 2007 - 79.58
- 2008 - 75.37
- 2009 - 76.25
