= 2009 Asian Athletics Championships – Men's javelin throw =

The men's javelin throw event at the 2009 Asian Athletics Championships was held at the Guangdong Olympic Stadium on November 14.

== Results ==
Rank	Athlete	Nationality	#1	#2	#3	#4	#5	#6	Result	Notes
1st place, gold medalist(s)	Yukifumi Murakami	Japan	78.74	x	77.69	81.50	–	–	81.50	
2nd place, silver medalist(s)	Wang Qingbo	China	68.57	78.51	78.53	x	76.21	80.25	80.25	PB
3rd place, bronze medalist(s)	Qin Qiang	China	80.08	76.09	78.17	x	77.57	x	80.08	SB
4	Om Narayan	India	74.19	75.36	69.35	73.52	69.22	72.14	75.36	PB
5	Ivan Zaytsev	Uzbekistan	74.37	73.51	69.34	73.81	65.61	x	74.37	
6	Kashinath Naik	India	73.38	x	70.31	x	71.31	71.91	73.38	
7	Jung Sang-Jin	South Korea	x	72.80	73.34	x	72.36	x	73.34	
8	Yasuo Ikeda	Japan	72.14	71.09	70.64	68.88	70.60	71.43	72.14	
9	Ammar Al-Najm	Iraq	70.17	68.29	70.92				70.92	SB
10	Bobur Shokirjonov	Uzbekistan	x	x	69.14				69.14	
	Abdullah Al-Sharidah	Saudi Arabia							DNS	
	Chen Yu-wen	Chinese Taipei							DNS	
