= 2011 Asian Athletics Championships – Men's javelin throw =

The Men's javelin throw event took place on July 10, 2011 at the Kobe Universiade Memorial Stadium.

== Medalists ==
| Gold | Yukifumi Murakami; Japan |
| Silver | Park Jae-Myong; South Korea |
| Bronze | Ivan Zaitsev; Uzbekistan |

== Records ==
| World record | Jan Železný (CZE) | 98.48 | Jena, Germany | 25 May 1996 |
| Asian record | Kazuhiro Mizoguchi (JPN) | 87.60 | San José, United States | 27 May 1989 |
| Championship record | Yukifumi Murakami (JPN) | 83.27 | Kobe, Japan | 2011 |

== Results ==
=== Final ===
| Rank | Athlete | Nationality | #1 | #2 | #3 | #4 | #5 | #6 | Result | Notes |
|---|---|---|---|---|---|---|---|---|---|---|
| 1st place, gold medalist(s) | Yukifumi Murakami | Japan | 77.99 | 79.85 | 80.93 | 83.27 | – | – | 83.27 | CR |
| 2nd place, silver medalist(s) | Park Jae-Myong | South Korea | 69.92 | 74.98 | 76.62 | 76.75 | 80.19 | x | 80.19 | |
| 3rd place, bronze medalist(s) | Ivan Zaitsev | Uzbekistan | 73.33 | 78.54 | 79.22 | 71.47 | 68.26 | 78.15 | 79.22 | |
| 4 | Jung Sang-Jin | South Korea | 73.47 | 74.12 | 74.05 | 78.65 | 77.88 | 78.63 | 78.65 | |
| 5 | Chen Qi | China | 78.40 | 76.69 | 76.31 | 75.96 | x | x | 78.40 | |
| 6 | Ken Aeai | Japan | 76.02 | 74.34 | 72.94 | x | x | 77.37 | 77.37 | |
| 7 | Genki Dean | Japan | 70.19 | 73.63 | 72.08 | 76.20 | 72.52 | 7316 | 76.20 | |
| 8 | Qin Qiang | China | 69.92 | 75.22 | 70.03 | x | x | 72.15 | 75.22 | |
| 9 | Bobur Shokirjonov | Uzbekistan | 69.73 | 69.81 | 65.18 | | | | 69.81 | |
| 10 | Lakshan Dayaratne | Sri Lanka | 68.78 | 68.04 | 68.47 | | | | 68.78 | |
| 11 | Chao-Tsun Cheng | Chinese Taipei | 66.55 | 64.50 | 67.86 | | | | 67.86 | |
| 12 | Ammar Al-Najm | Iraq | 64.61 | 66.71 | 67.43 | | | | 67.43 | |
| 13 | Danilo Fresnido | Philippines | 65.25 | 67.20 | 62.60 | | | | 67.20 | |
| 14 | Khamis Al Qatiti | Oman | 59.41 | 59.06 | 61.22 | | | | 61.22 | |
| 15 | Iurii Markovskii | Kyrgyzstan | 50.73 | x | x | | | | 50.73 | |
