= Harri Haatainen =

Finnish javelin thrower (born 1978)

Harri Juhani Haatainen (born 5 January 1978) is a Finnish javelin thrower, born in Lapua. His personal best throw is 86.63 metres, achieved in August 2001 in Gateshead.

== International competitions ==
Year	Competition	Venue	Position	Notes
Representing Finland
1995	European Junior Championships	Nyíregyháza, Hungary	2nd	74.28 m
1996	World Junior Championships	Sydney, Australia	2nd	76.12 m
1999	European U23 Championships	Gothenburg, Sweden	1st	83.02 m
1999	World Championships	Seville, Spain	11th	80.92 m
1999	Military World Games	Zagreb, Croatia	2nd	82.76 m
2000	Olympic Games	Sydney, Australia	19th	79.93 m
2001	World Championships	Edmonton, Canada	15th	81.43 m
2002	European Championships	Munich, Germany	9th	78.27 m

== Seasonal bests by year ==
- 1993 - 62.74
- 1994 - 73.48
- 1995 - 77.50
- 1996 - 82.52
- 1997 - 80.16
- 1998 - 79.07
- 1999 - 83.02
- 2000 - 86.10
- 2001 - 86.63
- 2002 - 84.28
- 2003 - 73.34
- 2004 - 72.16
- 2005 - 74.39
- 2006 - 77.32
- 2007 - 80.88
- 2008 - 81.18
- 2009 - 81.22
- 2010 - 84.53
- 2011 - 81.01
- 2012 - 79.14
- 2013 - 75.82
- 2014 - 77.61
- 2015 - 75.54
