= 1998 World Junior Championships in Athletics – Men's javelin throw =

The men's javelin throw event at the 1998 World Junior Championships in Athletics was held in Annecy, France, at Parc des Sports on 31 July and 2 August.

== Medalists ==
Gold	David Parker; United Kingdom
Silver	Hardus Pienaar; South Africa
Bronze	Yukifumi Murakami; Japan

== Results ==
=== Final ===
2 August

Rank	Name	Nationality	Attempts						Result	Notes
Rank	Name	Nationality	1	2	3	4	5	6	Result	Notes
1st place, gold medalist(s)	David Parker	United Kingdom	72.85	67.03	70.83	69.85	x	x	72.85	
2nd place, silver medalist(s)	Hardus Pienaar	South Africa	63.20	61.12	67.44	66.19	71.16	x	71.16	
3rd place, bronze medalist(s)	Yukifumi Murakami	Japan	66.87	70.72	63.22	69.78	68.98	x	70.72	
4	Bronisław Korda	Poland	68.14	67.52	x	66.77	68.70	69.95	69.95	
5	Scott Russell	Canada	61.67	69.17	x	64.08	67.64	59.18	69.17	
6	Wu Po-Hung	Chinese Taipei	66.30	64.73	59.82	63.47	61.67	62.98	66.30	
7	Andrew Martin	Australia	66.12	x	61.48	63.62	65.99	x	66.12	
8	Dan Carter	United Kingdom	66.10	x	x	61.62	63.37	64.45	66.10	
9	Jan Navara	Czech Republic	65.61	x	64.11				65.61	
10	Björn Lange	Germany	64.32	x	58.61				64.32	
11	Petr Belunek	Czech Republic	62.88	x	63.72				63.72	
12	Edwin Cuesta	Venezuela	x	62.53	60.74				62.53	

=== Qualifications ===
31 Jul

==== Group A ====
Rank	Name	Nationality	Attempts			Result	Notes
Rank	Name	Nationality	1	2	3	Result	Notes
1	Bronisław Korda	Poland	67.63	72.73	-	72.73	Q
2	Scott Russell	Canada	69.65	68.35	68.20	69.65	q
3	Hardus Pienaar	South Africa	65.15	65.81	69.44	69.44	q
4	Edwin Cuesta	Venezuela	67.90	x	x	67.90	q
5	Dan Carter	United Kingdom	67.64	x	65.26	67.64	q
6	Wu Po-Hung	Chinese Taipei	66.06	66.50	66.01	66.50	q
7	Björn Lange	Germany	64.23	63.50	66.10	66.10	q
8	Petr Belunek	Czech Republic	62.85	65.60	63.45	65.60	q
9	Ron White	United States	64.17	64.29	65.29	65.29	
10	Andis Anskins	Latvia	58.75	61.90	61.04	61.90	
11	Bogdan Vrhovec	Slovenia	60.55	58.95	56.70	60.55	
12	Ham Sung-Hoon	South Korea	58.54	x	x	58.54	

==== Group B ====
Rank	Name	Nationality	Attempts			Result	Notes
Rank	Name	Nationality	1	2	3	Result	Notes
1	Yukifumi Murakami	Japan	72.06	-	-	72.06	Q
2	Jan Navara	Czech Republic	67.53	66.86	68.67	68.67	q
3	David Parker	United Kingdom	66.57	x	67.29	67.29	q
4	Andrew Martin	Australia	66.20	x	65.86	66.20	q
5	Pasi Mäkipelto	Finland	61.77	63.12	65.01	65.01	
6	Stuart Farquhar	New Zealand	63.82	61.37	58.93	63.82	
7	Mattias Eriksson	Sweden	62.02	62.46	63.49	63.49	
8	Aleksey Danilyuk	Belarus	x	x	61.37	61.37	
9	Tim Werner	Germany	x	60.34	59.43	60.34	
10	Brian Kollar	United States	56.37	60.06	59.58	60.06	
11	Michael Allen	Ireland	59.39	59.04	59.55	59.55	
12	Pascal Joder	Switzerland	58.56	58.37	59.15	59.15	
13	Theunis Barnard	South Africa	58.80	58.76	57.61	58.80	

== Participation ==
According to an unofficial count, 25 athletes from 20 countries participated in the event.

- Australia (1)
- Belarus (1)
- Canada (1)
- Chinese Taipei (1)
- Czech Republic (2)
- Finland (1)
- Germany (2)
- Ireland (1)
- Japan (1)
- Latvia (1)
- New Zealand (1)
- Poland (1)
- Slovenia (1)
- South Africa (2)
- South Korea (1)
- Sweden (1)
- Switzerland (1)
- United Kingdom (2)
- United States (2)
- Venezuela (1)
