= Uladzimir Kazlou =

Belarusian javelin thrower

Personal information
- Born: April 20, 1985 (age 41)
- Height: 1.84 m (6 ft 1/2 in)
- Weight: 90 kg (200 lb)

Sport
- Country: Belarus
- Sport: Athletics
- Event: Javelin
- Updated on 11 August 2012

Uladzimir Uladzimiravich Kazlou (Belarusian: Уладзімір Уладзіміравіч Казлоў; born 20 April 1985) is a Belarusian javelin thrower. His personal best throw is 82.86.

== Achievements ==
Year	Competition	Venue	Position	Notes
Representing Belarus
2005	European U23 Championships	Erfurt, Germany	7th	72.81 m
2008	Olympic Games	Beijing, China	8th	82.06 m (=PB)
2009	Universiade	Belgrade, Serbia	5th	78.29 m
2010	European Championships	Barcelona, Spain	14th (q)	76.29 m
2012	Olympic Games	London, United Kingdom	15th (q)	80.06 m
2013	World Championships	Moscow, Russia	32nd (q)	72.66 m

== Seasonal bests by year ==
- 2006 - 77.27
- 2008 - 82.06
- 2009 - 78.29
- 2010 - 81.86
- 2012 - 82.86
- 2013 - 82.49
- 2015 - 76.90
