= Li Rongxiang =

Chinese javelin thrower (born 1972)

Medal record

Men's athletics

Representing China

Asian Championships
Gold medal – first place	2002 Colombo	Javelin throw
Gold medal – first place	2003 Manila	Javelin throw
Gold medal – first place	2005 Incheon	Javelin throw
Silver medal – second place	1998 Fukuoka	Javelin throw

Li Rongxiang (simplified Chinese: 李荣祥; traditional Chinese: 李榮祥; pinyin: Lǐ Róngxiáng; born January 18, 1972, in Zhejiang) is a male javelin thrower from PR China. His personal best throw is 84.29 metres, achieved in May 2000 in Chengdu.

== Achievements ==
Year	Competition	Venue	Position	Notes
Representing China
1998	Asian Championships	Fukuoka, Japan	2nd	77.48 m
1998	Asian Games	Bangkok, Thailand	3rd	78.57 m
1999	World Championships	Seville, Spain	17th (q)	79.24 m
2001	East Asian Games	Osaka, Japan	1st	81.55 m
2001	World Championships	Edmonton, Canada	9th	81.80 m
2002	Asian Championships	Colombo, Sri Lanka	1st	82.75 m
2002	World Cup	Madrid, Spain	6th	78.12 m
2002	Asian Games	Busan, South Korea	1st	82.21 m
2003	World Championships	Paris, France	10th	78.24 m
2003	Asian Championships	Manila, Philippines	1st	79.25 m
2003	Afro-Asian Games	Hyderabad, India	2nd	79.01 m
2004	Olympic Games	Athens, Greece	15th (q)	79.94 m
2005	World Championships	Helsinki, Finland	18th (q)	74.95 m
2005	Asian Championships	Incheon, South Korea	1st	74.95 m
2005	East Asian Games	Macau	1st	79.75 m
2006	Asian Games	Doha, Qatar	3rd	76.13 m

== Seasonal bests by year ==
- 1991 - 79.30
- 1998 - 81.81
- 1999 - 82.72
- 2000 - 84.29
- 2001 - 81.80
- 2002 - 82.75
- 2003 - 81.76
- 2004 - 83.32
- 2005 - 81.61
- 2006 - 79.96
