= Joakim Nilsson (javelin thrower) =

Swedish javelin thrower

Joakim Nilsson (born March 30, 1971) is a Swedish former All-American javelin thrower who competed for the Alabama Crimson Tide, 1991-1995. He won the Bryant Student Athlete Award, named after Bear Bryant, in 1995.

Joakim's younger brother, Mats Nilsson, won the NCAA Division 1 javelin title in 1997 for the University of Alabama.
