= Athletics at the 1995 Summer Universiade – Men's javelin throw =

Sports Event

The men's javelin throw event at the 1995 Summer Universiade was held on 31 August – 1 August at the Hakatanomori Athletic Stadium in Fukuoka, Japan.

== Medalists ==
Gold	Silver	Bronze
Zhang Lianbiao; China	Gregor Högler; Austria	Andrey Uglov; Ukraine

== Results ==
=== Qualification ===
Qualification: 74.00 m (Q) or at least 12 best (q) qualified for the final.

Rank	Group	Athlete	Nationality	#1	#2	#3	Result	Notes
1	A	Gregor Högler	Austria	78.58			78.58	Q
2	A	Andrey Uglov	Ukraine	72.44	76.02		76.02	Q
3	A	Yevgeniy Stankevich	Russia	73.94	75.86		75.86	Q
4	B	Sergey Voynov	Uzbekistan	71.36	72.12	74.96	74.96	Q
5	B	Dimitrios Polymerou	Greece	66.24	74.60		74.60	Q
6	B	Yoshifumi Sakamoto	Japan	72.00	70.94	74.10	74.10	Q
7	A	Johan van Lieshout	Netherlands	74.00			74.00	Q
8	B	Juha Laukkanen	Finland	73.54	72.24	73.84	73.84	q
9	A	Zhang Lianbiao	China	73.24	68.82	69.86	73.24	q
10	A	Robert Tersek	Slovenia	72.90	x	66.32	72.90	q
11	B	Peter Esenwein	Germany	72.66	72.80	x	72.80	q
12	A	Andries Booysen	South Africa	71.56	70.70	x	71.56	q
13	B	Hur Sung-min	South Korea	67.74	69.96	66.92	69.96	
14	B	Ēriks Rags	Latvia	67.80	69.64	67.20	69.64	
15	B	Sun Fuhai	China	68.10	69.42	66.10	69.42	
16	A	Graham Morfitt	Canada	66.20	67.90	68.54	68.54	
17	B	Erik Smith	United States	67.98	63.78	66.52	67.98	
18	A	Yoshiyuki Yamamoto	Japan	66.76	66.34	67.76	67.76	
19	A	John Corwin	United States	66.64	65.60	x	66.64	
20	B	Erin Bevans	Canada	66.12	67.34	67.36	67.36	
21	A	Rigoberto Calderón	Nicaragua	60.58	60.42	62.48	62.48	
22	A	Jorge Quiñónez	Peru	–	61.34	x	61.34	
23	A	Kalua McDonald	Malawi	42.72	40.20	42.08	42.72	
24	B	Cheong Chit Fong	Macau	x	x	36.82	36.82	
	B	Nery Kennedy	Paraguay				DNS	
	B	Rolando Laviena	Puerto Rico				DNS	

=== Final ===
Rank	Athlete	Nationality	#1	#2	#3	#4	#5	#6	Result	Notes
1st place, gold medalist(s)	Zhang Lianbiao	China	77.24	79.30	76.42	–	72.68	78.64	79.30	
2nd place, silver medalist(s)	Gregor Högler	Austria	74.28	74.26	71.06	72.92	74.26	77.52	77.52	
3rd place, bronze medalist(s)	Andrey Uglov	Ukraine	66.16	73.92	73.96	75.30	76.16	74.54	76.16	
4	Juha Laukkanen	Finland	74.04	73.62	69.68	72.14	72.54	75.56	75.56	
5	Yevgeniy Stankevich	Russia	75.00	71.38	x	73.68	73.70	70.28	75.00	
6	Andries Booysen	South Africa	72.34	73.14	x	x	x	x	73.14	
7	Dimitrios Polymerou	Greece	68.88	72.96	71.66	72.54	71.24	72.98	72.98	
8	Sergey Voynov	Uzbekistan	72.88	67.50	72.42	69.16	71.28	72.42	72.88	
9	Robert Tersek	Slovenia	72.18	65.76	69.98				72.18	
10	Johan van Lieshout	Netherlands	61.64	70.44	72.12				72.12	
11	Peter Esenwein	Germany	x	70.52	69.00				70.52	
12	Yoshifumi Sakamoto	Japan	x	68.98	68.60				68.98	
