= Csongor Olteán =

Hungarian javelin thrower

Personal information
- Full name: Csongor Olteán
- Nationality: Hungarian
- Born: 8 April 1984 (age 42) Sfântu Gheorghe, Romania
- Height: 1.90 m (6 ft 3 in)
- Weight: 83 kg (183 lb)

Sport
- Country: Hungary
- Sport: Javelin throw
- Club: Albertirsai SE

Achievements and titles
- Personal best: 80.01 m

Csongor Olteán (Hungarian: [ˈt͡ʃoŋɡor ˈoltɛaːn]; born 8 April 1984) is a Hungarian javelin thrower who won the Hungarian national championship four consecutive times from 2006 to 2009.

Olteán participated at two World Championship in 2007 and 2009, however he failed to progress from the qualifiers on both occasions. He was also present at the 2008 Summer Olympics, but did not manage to come through the qualifying round.
