= 2013 Asian Athletics Championships – Men's javelin throw =

The men's javelin throw at the 2013 Asian Athletics Championships was held at the Shree Shiv Chhatrapati Sports Complex on 5 July.

== Results ==
Rank	Name	Nationality	#1	#2	#3	#4	#5	#6	Result	Notes
1st place, gold medalist(s)	Ivan Zaytsev	Uzbekistan	79.76	74.33	x	x	76.41	78.33	79.76	
2nd place, silver medalist(s)	Sachith Maduranga	Sri Lanka	76.57	x	73.01	79.62	x	x	79.62	NR
3rd place, bronze medalist(s)	Samarjit Singh	India	x	75.03	x	x	x	x	75.03	
4	Krishan Kumar Patel	India	70.31	73.36	x	x	x	x	73.36	
5	Kim Ye-Ram	South Korea	67.93	72.81	69.23	x	69.47	68.20	72.81	
6	Bobur Shokirjonov	Uzbekistan	70.02	72.55	x	70.94	72.03	72.64	72.64	
7	Rajender Singh	India	67.33	71.82	x	70.31	x	69.61	71.82	
8	Chung Cheng-hung	Chinese Taipei	70.13	67.40	71.07	71.54	x	67.40	71.54	
9	Muhammad Imran	Pakistan	68.21	70.57	67.55				70.57	
10	Yuya Koriki	Japan	64.83	68.67	70.31				70.31	
11	Mohamad Ibrahim Kaida	Qatar	67.14	x	64.42				67.14	
12	Danilo Fresnido	Philippines	63.41	61.67	60.20				63.41	
	Abdullah Al-Ameeri	Kuwait							DNS	
