= Athletics at the 2001 Summer Universiade – Men's javelin throw =

The men's javelin throw event at the 2001 Summer Universiade was held at the Workers Stadium in Beijing, China between 30 August and 1 September.

== Medalists ==
Gold	Silver	Bronze
Ēriks Rags; Latvia	Isbel Luaces; Cuba	Gergely Horváth; Hungary

== Results ==
=== Qualification ===
Rank	Group	Athlete	Nationality	Result	Notes
1	B	Gerhardus Pienaar	South Africa	77.62	Q
2	A	Isbel Luaces	Cuba	77.18	Q
3	A	Gergely Horváth	Hungary	76.77	Q
4	B	Ēriks Rags	Latvia	75.98	Q
5	A	Yukifumi Murakami	Japan	74.26	q
6	A	Brian Erasmus	South Africa	74.13	q
7	B	David Parker	Great Britain	73.89	q
8	A	Laurent Dorique	France	73.84	q
9	A	Andis Anškins	Latvia	72.13	q
10	B	Jitsuya Utoda	Japan	70.88	q
11	B	Ronald White	United States	70.06	q
12	B	Scott Russell	Canada	70.01	q
13	B	Park Jae-myong	South Korea	69.83	
14	A	Sebastjan Grosek	Slovenia	69.10	
15	A	Diego Moraga	Chile	68.52	
16	B	Chiang Wan-hsing	Chinese Taipei	67.66	
17	B	Tomas Intas	Lithuania	67.28	
18	A	Chris Clever	United States	65.92	
19	?	Iosefo Vuloaloa	Fiji	59.42	

=== Final ===
Rank	Athlete	Nationality	Result	Notes
1st place, gold medalist(s)	Ēriks Rags	Latvia	82.72	
2nd place, silver medalist(s)	Isbel Luaces	Cuba	81.68	
3rd place, bronze medalist(s)	Gergely Horváth	Hungary	80.03	
4	Brian Erasmus	South Africa	77.62	
5	Gerhardus Pienaar	South Africa	76.79	
6	Laurent Dorique	France	75.24	
7	Yukifumi Murakami	Japan	71.75	
8	Jitsuya Utoda	Japan	71.44	
9	Andis Anškins	Latvia	71.27	
10	Scott Russell	Canada	70.99	
11	David Parker	Great Britain	69.03	
12	Ronald White	United States	64.32	
