= Ivan Zaytsev (athlete) =

Uzbekistani javelin thrower (born 1988)

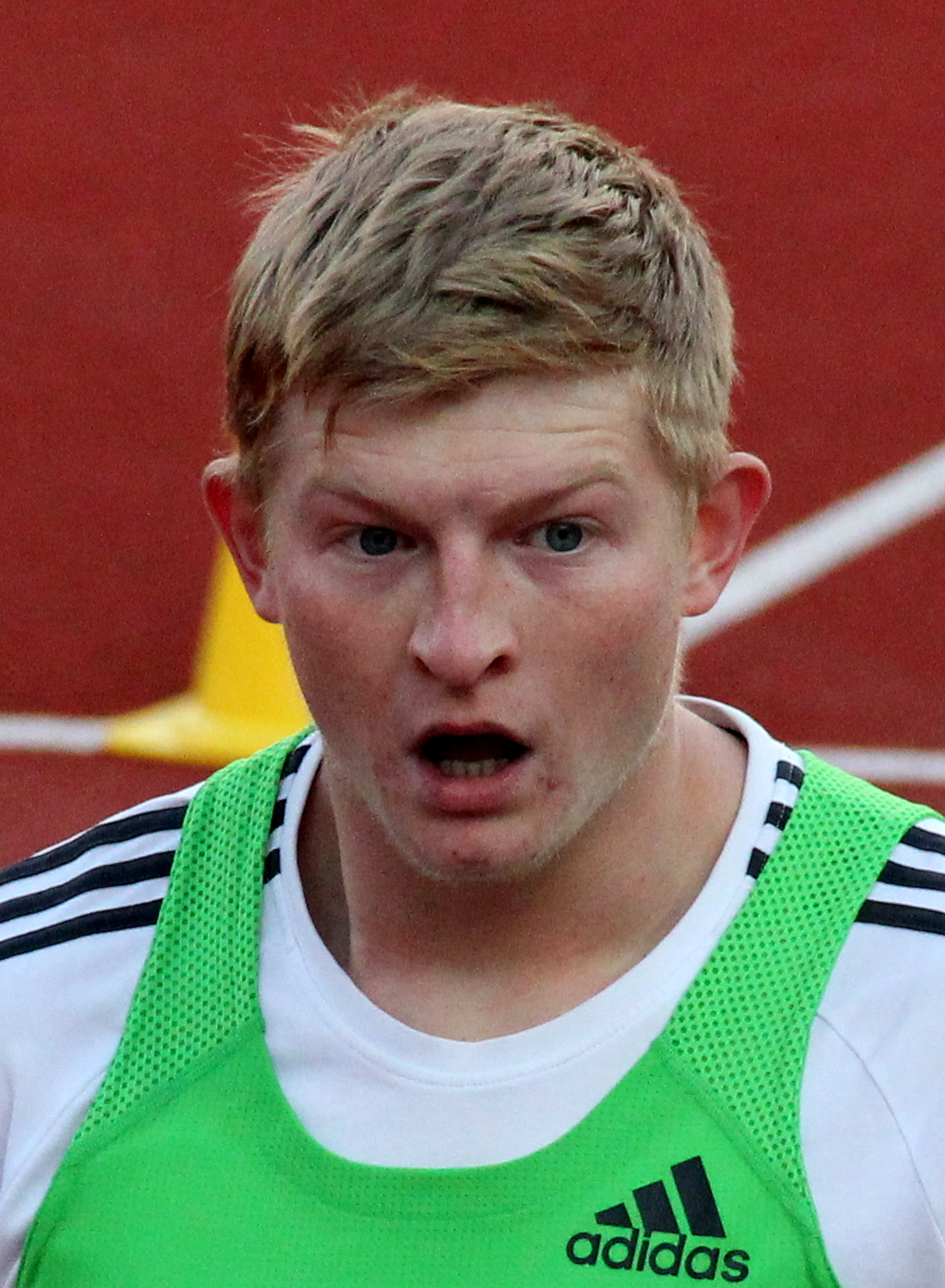
- Ivan Zaytsev in 2012.

Personal information
- Born: Ivan Viktorovich Zaytsev; 11 November 1988 (age 37) Tashkent, Uzbek SSR, Soviet Union

Sport
- Country: Uzbekistan
- Sport: Athletics
- Event: Javelin throw
Medal record
Asian Games
Bronze medal – third place	2014 Incheon	Javelin thrower
Asian Athletics Championships
Gold medal – first place	2013 Pune	Javelin throw
Bronze medal – third place	2011 Kobe	Javelin throw

Ivan Viktorovich Zaytsev (Russian: Иван Викторович Зайцев; born 11 November 1988 in Tashkent) is an Uzbekistani javelin thrower. He competed in the javelin throw at the 2012 Summer Olympics and placed 36th with a mark of 73.94 metres. He competed at the 2016 Olympics, finishing in 26th, with a throw of 77.83. He has also competed at World Championship-level, at the 2013 World Championships, reaching the final, and finishing 11th with a throw of 78.33. His personal best is 85.03 metres.

== Competition record ==
Year	Competition	Venue	Position	Notes
Representing Uzbekistan
2007	Asian Championships	Amman, Jordan	9th	61.14 m
2009	Asian Championships	Guangzhou, China	5th	74.37 m
2011	Asian Championships	Kobe, Japan	3rd	79.22 m
2012	Olympic Games	London, United Kingdom	36th (q)	73.94 m
2013	Asian Championships	Pune, India	1st	79.76 m
2013	World Championships	Moscow, Russia	11th	78.33 m
2014	Asian Games	Incheon, South Korea	3rd	83.68 m
2016	Olympic Games	Rio de Janeiro, Brazil	26th (q)	77.83 m
2017	Islamic Solidarity Games	Baku, Azerbaijan	2nd	78.66 m

== Seasonal bests by year ==
- 2007 – 61.14
- 2008 – 70.09
- 2009 – 75.07
- 2010 – 75.32
- 2011 – 79.39
- 2012 – 85.03
- 2013 – 83.79
- 2014 – 83.68
- 2016 – 83.03
- 2017 – 78.66
