= Central Asian Games =

International multi-sport event

- Abbreviation: CAG
- Purpose: Multi-sport event for nations of Central Asia
- Frequency: Every 2 years
- Inaugurated: 1995 Central Asian Games in Tashkent, Uzbekistan
- Next event: 2026 Central Asian Games

The Central Asian Games is an international multi-sport event organised by the Central Asian Olympic Committee and held every two years since 1995 among athletes from Iran and Central Asian countries and territories of the Olympic Council of Asia, especially formerly members of the Union of Soviet Socialist Republics.

The Central Asian Games is one of five subregional Games of the Olympic Council of Asia. The others are the East Asian Youth Games, the South Asian Games, the Southeast Asian Games, and the West Asian Games.

== History ==
In April 1994, President of the International Olympic Committee Juan Antonio Samaranch visited Tashkent, Uzbekistan. During the meeting, President of Uzbekistan Islam Karimov asked him about the possibility of hosting the Olympic Games in Tashkent, to which the IOC President replied that for this, at the request of the Olympic Charter, serious competitions, at least regional ones, should be held. After this, a meeting of the heads of the National Olympic Committees of Kazakhstan, Uzbekistan, Kyrgyzstan, Turkmenistan and Tajikistan was held in Tashkent, at which a decision was made to organize the Central Asian Games.

Despite the fact that the games should be held every two years, for various reasons they have been canceled more than once, and after 2005 have not actually been held. The Games where scheduled to be revived for 2021 after National Olympic Committee Chairs from the respective countries met in Kazakhstan in February 2020.

== Participating nations ==
All seven nations whose National Olympic Committees are recognized by the Central Asian Olympic Committee and one nation whose National Olympic Committee is recognized by the East Asian Olympic Committee.

- Afghanistan (National Olympic Committee of the Islamic Republic of Afghanistan; AFG)
- Iran (National Olympic Committee of the Islamic Republic of Iran; IRI)
- Kazakhstan (National Olympic Committee of the Republic of Kazakhstan; KAZ)
- Kyrgyzstan (National Olympic Committee of the Kyrgyz Republic; KGZ)
- Tajikistan (National Olympic Committee of the Republic of Tajikistan; TJK)
- Turkmenistan (National Olympic Committee of Turkmenistan; TKM)
- Uzbekistan (National Olympic Committee of the Republic of Uzbekistan; UZB)

=== Former participants ===
- Chinese Taipei (Chinese Taipei Olympic Committee; TPE)^{1}

^{1}Participated only in 1999, as an invitee.

== Editions ==
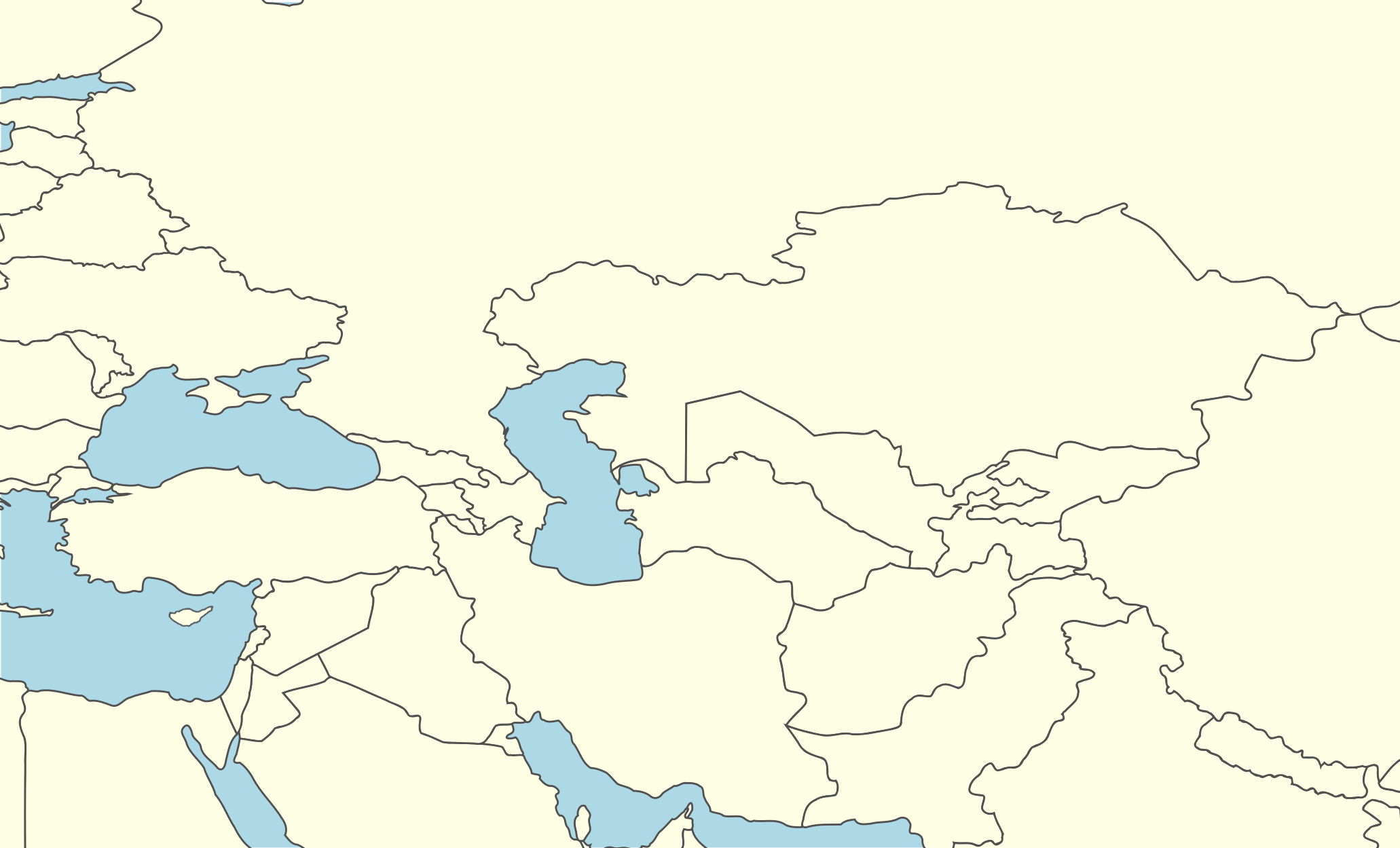
Host cities of the Central Asian Games

Edition	Year	Host city	Host nation	Opened by	Start Date	End Date	Nations	Competitors	Sports	Events	Top Placed Team	Ref.
I	1995	Tashkent	Uzbekistan	President Islam Karimov	1 September	8 September	5	—N/a	12	158	Kazakhstan (KAZ)	
II	1997	Almaty	Kazakhstan	President Nursultan Nazarbayev	13 September	20 September	5	—N/a	13	173	Kazakhstan (KAZ)	
III	1999	Bishkek	Kyrgyzstan	President Askar Akayev	1 October	7 October	6	—N/a	10	163	Kazakhstan (KAZ)	
IIV	2001	Ashgabat	Turkmenistan	Cancelled								
V	2003	Dushanbe	Tajikistan	President Emomali Rahmon	14 October	20 October	5	—N/a	9	107	Kazakhstan (KAZ)	
–	2005	Tashkent	Uzbekistan	Cancelled								
V	2021	—N/a		Postponed due to the COVID-19 pandemic								

== Sports ==
Thirteen sports were presented in Central Asian Games history.

Sport	Years
Aquatics	All
Athletics	All
Basketball	All
Boxing	All
Cycling	1995–1999
Fencing	1995–1999
Judo	since 1997
Shooting	All
Taekwondo	since 2003
Tennis	All
Volleyball	1995–1997, since 2003
Weightlifting	1995–1999
Wrestling	1995–1997, since 2003

Sport	Disciplines	Years
Wrestling	Freestyle	1995–1997, since 2003
Wrestling	Greco-Roman	1995–1997, since 2003

== Medal table ==
Rank	Nation	Gold	Silver	Bronze	Total
1	Kazakhstan (KAZ)	368	232	129	729
2	Uzbekistan (UZB)	153	192	158	503
3	Kyrgyzstan (KGZ)	58	122	198	378
4	Tajikistan (TJK)	20	28	50	98
5	Turkmenistan (TKM)	2	25	89	116
Totals (5 entries)		601	599	624	1,824

== See also ==
- Events of the OCA (Continental)
  - Asian Games
  - Asian Winter Games
  - Asian Youth Games
  - Asian Beach Games
  - Asian Indoor and Martial Arts Games
- Events of the OCA (Subregional)
  - East Asian Games (now defunct)
  - East Asian Youth Games
  - South Asian Games
  - Southeast Asian Games
  - West Asian Games
- Events of the APC (Continental)
  - Asian Para Games
  - Asian Winter Para Games
  - Asian Youth Para Games
  - Asian Youth Winter Para Games
- Events of the APC (Subregional)
  - ASEAN Para Games
