= 2005 European Athletics U23 Championships – Men's javelin throw =

The men's javelin throw event at the 2005 European Athletics U23 Championships was held in Erfurt, Germany, at Steigerwaldstadion on 15 and 17 July.

== Medalists ==
Gold	Igor Janik; Poland
Silver	Antti Ruuskanen; Finland
Bronze	Magnus Arvidsson; Sweden

== Results ==
=== Final ===
17 July

Rank	Name	Nationality	Attempts						Result	Notes
Rank	Name	Nationality	1	2	3	4	5	6	Result	Notes
1st place, gold medalist(s)	Igor Janik	Poland	72.71	77.25	77.03	x	x	75.50	77.25	
2nd place, silver medalist(s)	Antti Ruuskanen	Finland	73.76	75.04	74.81	75.31	76.82	72.88	76.82	
3rd place, bronze medalist(s)	Magnus Arvidsson	Sweden	74.83	76.15	71.94	74.06	68.10	70.41	76.15	
4	Vladislav Shkurlatov	Russia	73.58	x	74.81	76.12	x	72.04	76.12	
5	Tero Järvenpää	Finland	69.53	70.90	75.25	x	x	75.25	75.25	
6	Teemu Wirkkala	Finland	69.61	74.97	74.30	70.97	72.28	x	74.97	
7	Uladzimir Kazlou	Belarus	62.56	67.09	72.81	70.42	70.39	64.28	72.81	
8	Ciprian Moruţan	Romania	x	71.74	x	70.52	70.92	69.07	71.74	
9	Ilya Korotkov	Russia	x	69.18	x				69.18	
10	Kristo Galeta	Estonia	69.13	x	67.68				69.13	
11	Kārlis Alainis	Latvia	x	65.12	60.81				65.12	
12	Alex van der Merwe	United Kingdom	62.26	63.00	63.62				63.62	

=== Qualifications ===
15 July
Qualifying 72.50 or 12 best to the Final

==== Group A ====
Rank	Name	Nationality	Result	Notes
1	Vladislav Shkurlatov	Russia	81.14	Q
2	Tero Järvenpää	Finland	78.88	Q
3	Teemu Wirkkala	Finland	74.85	Q
4	Ciprian Moruţan	Romania	73.13	Q
5	Kristo Galeta	Estonia	72.52	Q
6	Uladzimir Kazlou	Belarus	68.64	q
7	Matija Kranjc	Slovenia	67.58	
8	Edijs Kravalis	Latvia	63.39	

==== Group B ====
Rank	Name	Nationality	Result	Notes
1	Igor Janik	Poland	75.98	Q
2	Magnus Arvidsson	Sweden	72.86	Q
3	Antti Ruuskanen	Finland	72.76	Q
4	Ilya Korotkov	Russia	71.62	q
5	Kārlis Alainis	Latvia	69.84	q
6	Alex van der Merwe	United Kingdom	68.58	q
7	Marko Jänes	Estonia	66.88	

== Participation ==
According to an unofficial count, 15 athletes from 10 countries participated in the event.

- Belarus (1)
- Estonia (2)
- Finland (3)
- Latvia (2)
- Poland (1)
- Romania (1)
- Russia (2)
- Slovenia (1)
- Sweden (1)
- United Kingdom (1)
