= Ilya Korotkov =

Russian javelin thrower

Personal information
- Born: December 6, 1983 (age 42)
- Height: 1.93 m (6 ft 4 in)
- Weight: 90 kg (200 lb)

Sport
- Country: Russia
- Sport: Athletics
- Event: Javelin
- Updated on 11 August 2012

Ilya Yevgenyevich Korotkov (Russian: Илья Евгеньевич Коротков; born 6 December 1983) is a Russian javelin thrower.

He represented Russia at the Olympics at the 2008 Beijing Olympics and finished seventh in the final. The following year he took silver at the inaugural European Team Championships in Leiria, Portugal, but he could not repeat his medal success at the 2009 World Championships in Athletics, where he failed to make the final of the event.

At the start of the 2010 season, he threw personal best of 85.47 m in Alder, Russia, and continued his good form by throwing 83.28 m to win the gold at the 2010 European Cup Winter Throwing meeting.

== International competitions ==
Representing Russia
Year	Competition	Venue	Position	Notes
2005	European U23 Championships	Erfurt, Germany	9th	69.18 m
2007	Universiade	Bangkok, Thailand	14th (q)	66.71 m
2008	Olympic Games	Beijing, China	7th	83.15 m
2009	World Championships	Berlin, Germany	38th (q)	71.59 m
2010	European Cup Winter Throwing	Arles, France	1st	83.28 m
2010	European Championships	Barcelona, Spain	21st (q)	72.04 m
2012	Olympic Games	London, United Kingdom	33rd (q)	75.68 m

== Seasonal bests by year ==
- 2004 - 77.91
- 2005 - 76.31
- 2006 - 78.23
- 2007 - 83.94
- 2008 - 84.04
- 2009 - 83.24
- 2010 - 85.47
- 2011 - 74.66
- 2012 - 79.61
- 2013 - 74.23
- 2014 - 79.34
- 2015 - 74.60
