= Jung Sang-jin (javelin thrower) =

South Korean javelin thrower

Medal record

Men's athletics

Representing South Korea

Asian Championships
Silver medal – second place	2005 Incheon	Javelin throw
Bronze medal – third place	2007 Amman	Javelin throw

- Jung Sang-jin
- Hangul: 정상진
- RR: Jeong Sangjin
- MR: Chŏng Sangjin

Jung Sang-jin (Korean: 정상진; born 16 April 1984) is a South Korean javelin thrower. He was born in Seoul.

His personal best throw is 82.05 metres, achieved in June 2012 in Daejeon.

== Achievements ==
Year	Competition	Venue	Position	Notes
Representing South Korea
2001	Asian Junior Championships	Bandar Seri Begawan, Brunei	4th	68.96 m
2002	World Junior Championships	Kingston, Jamaica	3rd	73.99 m
2002	Asian Junior Championships	Bangkok, Thailand	1st	75.36 m
2005	Universiade	İzmir, Turkey	17th (q)	69.55 m
2005	Asian Championships	Incheon, South Korea	2nd	76.85 m
2007	Asian Championships	Amman, Jordan	3rd	70.95 m
2007	Universiade	Bangkok, Thailand	9th	74.22 m
2009	Universiade	Belgrade, Serbia	8th	76.15 m
2009	World Championships	Berlin, Germany	36th (q)	72.80 m
2009	Asian Championships	Guangzhou, China	7th	73.34 m
2010	Asian Games	Guangzhou, China	9th	71.59 m
2011	Asian Championships	Kobe, Japan	4th	78.65 m
2011	World Championships	Daegu, South Korea	34th (q)	72.03 m
2012	Olympic Games	London, United Kingdom	31st (q)	76.37 m

== Seasonal bests by year ==
- 2006 - 76.85
- 2007 - 75.34
- 2008 - 75.75
- 2009 - 79.69
- 2010 - 80.89
- 2011 - 80.38
- 2012 - 82.05
- 2013 - 77.60
- 2014 - 74.84
- 2015 - 75.36
