= 2007 Asian Athletics Championships – Men's javelin throw =

The men's javelin throw event at the 2007 Asian Athletics Championships was held in Amman, Jordan on July 29.

== Results ==
Rank	Name	Nationality	Result	Notes
1st place, gold medalist(s)	Chen Qi	China	78.07	
2nd place, silver medalist(s)	Park Jae-myong	South Korea	75.77	
3rd place, bronze medalist(s)	Jung Sang-Jin	South Korea	70.95	
4	Rinat Tarzumanov	Uzbekistan	70.35	
5	Muhammad Hussein Irfan	Pakistan	70.03	
6	Ken Arai	Japan	67.87	
7	Danilo Fresnido	Philippines	67.37	
8	Firas Zaal Al-Mohammed	Syria	67.30	
9	Ivan Zaytsev	Uzbekistan	61.14	
