= Athletics at the 2014 Asian Games – Men's javelin throw =

Men's javelin throw at the 2014 Asian Games
- Venue: Incheon Asiad Main Stadium
- Dates: 2 October 2014
- Competitors: 17 from 11 nations

Medalists
| gold medal | Zhao Qinggang | China |
| silver medal | Ryohei Arai | Japan |
| bronze medal | Ivan Zaytsev | Uzbekistan |

The men's javelin throw event at the 2014 Asian Games was held at the Incheon Asiad Main Stadium, Incheon, South Korea on 2 October.

== Schedule ==
All times are Korea Standard Time (UTC+09:00)

| Date | Time | Event |
|---|---|---|
| Thursday, 2 October 2014 | 18:52 | Final |

== Records ==
Prior to this competition, the existing world, Asian and Games records were as follows.

| World Record | Jan Železný (CZE) | 98.48 | Jena, Germany | 25 May 1996 |
| Asian Record | Kazuhiro Mizoguchi (JPN) | 87.60 | San Jose, United States | 27 May 1989 |
| Games Record | Zhang Lianbiao (CHN) | 83.38 | Hiroshima, Japan | 16 October 1994 |

== Results ==
| Rank | Athlete | Attempt | | | | | | Result | Notes |
| Rank | Athlete | 1 | 2 | 3 | 4 | 5 | 6 | Result | Notes |
|---|---|---|---|---|---|---|---|---|---|
| 1st place, gold medalist(s) | Zhao Qinggang (CHN) | 75.14 | 81.96 | 85.29 | X | 86.50 | 89.15 | 89.15 | AR |
| 2nd place, silver medalist(s) | Ryohei Arai (JPN) | 80.74 | 74.98 | 80.13 | 84.42 | 78.65 | 79.81 | 84.42 | |
| 3rd place, bronze medalist(s) | Ivan Zaytsev (UZB) | 78.49 | X | 74.90 | 78.77 | 83.68 | 76.47 | 83.68 | |
| 4 | Yukifumi Murakami (JPN) | 81.66 | X | X | — | 77.27 | X | 81.66 | |
| 5 | Cheng Chao-tsun (TPE) | X | 73.34 | 75.07 | 78.96 | 81.61 | X | 81.61 | |
| 6 | Song Bin (CHN) | 75.50 | 72.33 | X | 71.90 | 76.49 | 75.68 | 76.49 | |
| 7 | Bobur Shokirjonov (UZB) | 74.82 | 75.41 | 76.34 | X | X | X | 76.34 | |
| 8 | Park Jae-myong (KOR) | 74.68 | X | X | X | X | 70.17 | 74.68 | |
| 9 | Huang Shih-feng (TPE) | X | X | 74.65 | | | | 74.65 | |
| 10 | Kim Ye-ram (KOR) | 74.42 | X | 71.74 | | | | 74.42 | |
| 11 | Rajender Singh (IND) | 73.43 | 71.87 | X | | | | 73.43 | |
| 12 | Hussadin Rodmanee (THA) | 66.65 | 69.78 | X | | | | 69.78 | |
| 13 | Mohamed Ibrahim Kaida (QAT) | X | X | 66.57 | | | | 66.57 | |
| 14 | Peerachet Jantra (THA) | 63.75 | X | 65.63 | | | | 65.63 | |
| 15 | Ali Al-Abdulghani (KSA) | 61.38 | 63.15 | 62.34 | | | | 63.15 | |
| 16 | Abdullah Al-Ameeri (KUW) | 59.74 | 60.03 | 62.46 | | | | 62.46 | |
| 17 | Abdullah Munassar (YEM) | 47.14 | 50.23 | 50.41 | | | | 50.41 | |
