= Gregor Högler =

Austrian javelin thrower

Personal information
- Born: June 27, 1972 (age 54) Vienna, Austria

Sport
- Sport: Track and field
Medal record
Representing Austria
Summer Universiade
Silver medal – second place	1995 Fukuoka	Javelin throw
Silver medal – second place	1999 Palma de Mallorca	Javelin throw
Bronze medal – third place	1997 Catania	Javelin throw

Gregor Högler (born June 27, 1972) is a male javelin thrower and coach from Austria, vice president of Österreichischer Leichtathletik Verband. His personal best was 84.03 metres, achieved in July 1999 in Kapfenberg. This is the national record.

== Seasonal bests by year ==
- 1995 - 78.54
- 1997 - 83.00
- 1998 - 81.89
- 1999 - 84.03 NR
- 2000 - 82.03
- 2001 - 81.98
- 2002 - 80.52
- 2003 - 77.56
- 2005 - 68.72
- 2006 - 73.53

== Achievements ==
Year	Competition	Venue	Position	Notes
Representing Austria
1995	World Championships	Gothenburg, Sweden	18th (q)	76.40 m
1995	Universiade	Fukuoka, Japan	2nd	77.52 m
1997	World Championships	Athens, Greece	10th	81.56 m
1997	Universiade	Catania, Italy	3rd	81.12 m
1998	European Championships	Budapest, Hungary	10th	81.75 m
1999	Universiade	Palma, Spain	2nd	82.63 m
1999	World Championships	Seville, Spain	23rd (q)	75.94 m
2000	Olympic Games	Sydney, Australia	15th (q)	80.89 m
2002	European Championships	Munich, Germany	14th (q)	78.40 m
