= Athletics at the 2010 Asian Games – Men's javelin throw =

Men's javelin throw at the 2010 Asian Games
- Venue: Aoti Main Stadium
- Date: 26 November 2010
- Competitors: 14 from 10 nations

Medalists
gold medal	Yukifumi Murakami	Japan
silver medal	Park Jae-myong	South Korea
bronze medal	Rinat Tarzumanov	Uzbekistan

The men's javelin throw event at the 2010 Asian Games was held at the Aoti Main Stadium, Guangzhou, China on 26 November 2010.

== Schedule ==
All times are China Standard Time (UTC+08:00)

Date	Time	Event
Friday, 26 November 2010	17:05	Final

== Records ==
Prior to this competition, the existing world, Asian and Games records were as follows.

World Record	Jan Železný (CZE)	98.48	Jena, Germany	25 May 1996
Asian Record	Kazuhiro Mizoguchi (JPN)	87.60	San Jose, United States	27 May 1989
Games Record	Zhang Lianbiao (CHN)	83.38	Hiroshima, Japan	16 October 1994

== Results ==
Rank	Athlete	Attempt						Result	Notes
Rank	Athlete	1	2	3	4	5	6	Result	Notes
1st place, gold medalist(s)	Yukifumi Murakami (JPN)	79.62	83.15	—	—	76.94	—	83.15	
2nd place, silver medalist(s)	Park Jae-myong (KOR)	78.73	76.64	79.92	79.64	X	79.01	79.92	
3rd place, bronze medalist(s)	Rinat Tarzumanov (UZB)	71.94	74.48	79.65	X	X	X	79.65	
4	Qin Qiang (CHN)	77.10	78.51	X	X	77.35	73.47	78.51	
5	Jiang Xingyu (CHN)	73.80	77.17	72.77	74.26	76.26	74.34	77.17	
6	Rajender Singh (IND)	72.66	71.35	73.41	69.52	72.00	74.70	74.70	
7	Mehdi Ravaei (IRI)	67.53	74.31	74.13	70.64	72.13	72.75	74.31	
8	Kashinath Naik (IND)	72.54	73.96	X	X	73.60	73.16	73.96	
9	Jung Sang-jin (KOR)	70.05	68.83	71.59				71.59	
10	Danilo Fresnido (PHI)	70.35	61.98	66.34				70.35	
11	Ammar Makki (IRQ)	70.32	X	X				70.32	
12	Hussadin Rodmanee (THA)	69.81	X	63.37				69.81	
13	Abdullah Al-Ameeri (IOC)	66.53	66.56	X				66.56	
14	Bobur Shokirjonov (UZB)	X	52.83	66.02				66.02	
