= Athletics at the 2008 Summer Olympics – Men's javelin throw =

Men's javelin throw at the Games of the XXIX Olympiad
- Venue: Beijing National Stadium
- Date: 21 August 2008 (qualification); 23 August 2008 (final)
- Competitors: 38 from 29 nations
- Winning distance: 90.57 OR

Medalists
1st place, gold medalist(s)		Andreas Thorkildsen; Norway
2nd place, silver medalist(s)		Ainārs Kovals; Latvia
3rd place, bronze medalist(s)		Tero Pitkämäki; Finland

The men's javelin throw event at the 2008 Summer Olympics took place on 21 and 23 August at the Beijing National Stadium. The qualification mark was set at 82.50 metres.

The qualifying standards were 81.80 m (268.37 ft) (A standard) and 77.80 m (255.25 ft) (B standard).

== Schedule ==
All times are China standard time (UTC+8)

Date	Time	Round
Thursday, 21 August 2008	10:10	Qualifications
Saturday, 23 August 2008	19:10	Finals

== Records ==
Prior to the competition, the existing world record, Olympic record, and world leading mark were as follows:

World record	Jan Železný (CZE)	98.48 m	Jena, Germany	25 May 1996
Olympic record	Jan Železný (CZE)	90.17 m	Sydney, Australia	23 September 2000
World Leading	Jarrod Bannister (AUS)	89.02	Brisbane, Australia	29 February 2008

The following new Olympic record was set during this competition:

Date	Event	Athlete	Time	Notes
23 August	Final	Andreas Thorkildsen (NOR)	90.57	OR

== Results ==
=== Qualifying round ===
Qualification: 82.50 (Q) or at least 12 best performers (q) advance to the final.

Rank	Group	Athlete	Nationality	#1	#2	#3	Result	Notes
1	B	Vadims Vasiļevskis	Latvia	83.51			83.51	Q
2	B	Ilya Korotkov	Russia	79.13	83.33		83.33	Q
3	B	Tero Pitkämäki	Finland	x	82.61		82.61	Q
4	B	Tero Järvenpää	Finland	77.76	82.34	-	82.34	q
5	B	Vítězslav Veselý	Czech Republic	x	78.93	81.20	81.20	q, PB
6	A	Scott Russell	Canada	80.42	-	-	80.42	q
7	A	Ainārs Kovals	Latvia	x	x	80.15	80.15	q
8	A	Uladzimir Kazlou	Belarus	77.07	80.06	78.41	80.06	q
9	B	Andreas Thorkildsen	Norway	79.85	x	-	79.85	q
10	A	Teemu Wirkkala	Finland	79.79	78.89	75.81	79.79	q
11	A	Jarrod Bannister	Australia	79.79	x	77.40	79.79	q
12	A	Magnus Arvidsson	Sweden	79.70	75.35	76.07	79.70	q
13	A	Ēriks Rags	Latvia	79.33	x	77.97	79.33	
14	B	Alexandr Ivanov	Russia	75.73	73.89	79.27	79.27	
15	A	Yukifumi Murakami	Japan	x	78.21	76.29	78.21	
16	A	Igor Janik	Poland	71.43	67.59	77.63	77.63	
17	A	Park Jae-Myong	South Korea	76.63	75.61	74.25	76.63	
18	B	Leigh Smith	United States	x	74.18	76.55	76.55	
19	A	John Robert Oosthuizen	South Africa	x	74.55	76.16	76.16	
20	B	Stuart Farquhar	New Zealand	76.14	75.51	73.87	76.14	
21	B	Mihkel Kukk	Estonia	63.42	70.55	75.56	75.56	
22	A	Breaux Greer	United States	73.68	-	-	73.68	SB
23	B	Chen Qi	China	73.50	x	x	73.50	
24	A	Ignacio Guerra	Chile	71.07	71.35	73.03	73.03	
25	B	Mike Hazle	United States	x	72.75	71.69	72.75	
26	A	Sergey Makarov	Russia	x	x	72.47	72.47	
27	B	Ioannis-Georgios Smalios	Greece	x	71.87	67.39	71.87	
28	A	Anier Boue	Cuba	71.29	71.85	x	71.85	
29	B	Roman Avramenko	Ukraine	71.64	70.68	71.10	71.64	
30	A	Victor Fatecha	Paraguay	70.59	71.58	68.79	71.58	
31	B	Matija Kranjc	Slovenia	71.00	x	x	71.00	
32	A	Stephan Steding	Germany	x	70.05	x	70.05	
33	A	Bobur Shokirjonov	Uzbekistan	69.54	66.29	68.29	69.54	
34	B	Pablo Pietrobelli	Argentina	58.04	66.95	69.09	69.09	
35	B	Alexander Vieweg	Germany	67.49	66.37	67.39	67.49	
36	B	Kolyo Neshev	Bulgaria	66.00	x	x	66.00	
37	B	Melik Janoyan	Armenia	x	x	64.47	64.47	
	A	Csongor Olteán	Hungary	x	x	x	NM	

AR area record | CR championship record | GR games record | NR national record | OR Olympic record | PB personal best | SB season best | WL world leading (in a given season)
DNS = did not start | DQ = disqualification | NM = no mark (i.e. no valid result) | Q = qualification by place in heat | q = qualification by overall place

=== Final ===
Rank	Athlete	Nationality	1	2	3	4	5	6	Result	Notes
1st place, gold medalist(s)	Andreas Thorkildsen	Norway	84.72	85.91	87.93	85.13	90.57	x	90.57	OR
2nd place, silver medalist(s)	Ainārs Kovals	Latvia	79.45	82.63	82.28	78.98	80.65	86.64	86.64	PB
3rd place, bronze medalist(s)	Tero Pitkämäki	Finland	83.75	x	80.69	85.83	x	86.16	86.16	
4	Tero Järvenpää	Finland	83.95	x	x	x	x	83.63	83.95	
5	Teemu Wirkkala	Finland	–	73.90	83.46	x	x	78.23	83.46	
6	Jarrod Bannister	Australia	83.45	80.59	82.20	x	x	x	83.45	
7	Ilya Korotkov	Russia	82.54	x	76.84	82.15	x	83.15	83.15	
8	Uladzimir Kazlou	Belarus	82.06	77.57	74.09	x	x	75.36	82.06	PB
9	Vadims Vasiļevskis	Latvia	76.75	x	81.32				81.32	
10	Scott Russell	Canada	80.90	78.02	x				80.90	
11	Magnus Arvidsson	Sweden	79.85	79.57	80.16				80.16	
12	Vítězslav Veselý	Czech Republic	x	x	76.76				76.76	
