= Scott Russell (javelin thrower) =

Canadian javelin thrower

Personal information
- Born: January 16, 1979 (age 47) Windsor, Ontario, Canada
- Height: 2.06 m (6 ft 9 in)
- Weight: 122 kg (269 lb)

Sport
- Country: Canada
- Sport: Track and field
- Event: Javelin throw
- College team: Kansas Jayhawks
- Club: Windsor Legion

Achievements and titles
- Personal bests: 84.81 m (2011) NR
Medal record
Men's track and field
Representing Canada
Commonwealth Games
Silver medal – second place	2002 Manchester	Javelin throw

Scott Russell (born January 16, 1979, in Windsor, Ontario) is a Canadian former javelin thrower.

Representing the Kansas Jayhawks track and field team, Russell won the javelin throw at the 2002 NCAA Division I Outdoor Track and Field Championships. He represented Canada at the 1998 World Junior Championships, the 2001 Summer Universiade, two Commonwealth Games (2002 and 2006), and at four World Championships in Athletics (2001, 2005, 2007, and 2011). His highest international placement was a silver medal at the 2002 Commonwealth Games.

Russell's personal best throw of 84.81m remains the Canadian record in the event, which he set at the Toronto International Track and Field Games on July 13, 2011. Russell announced his retirement on January 8, 2013, and now teaches at Basehor-Linwood Middle School in Basehor, Kansas and coaches track and field at multiple schools in the area. Russell was inducted into the Windsor/Essex County Sports Hall of Fame in 2015, and will be inducted into the Kansas Sports Hall of Fame as part of its class of 2024.

== International competitions ==
Representing Canada
Year	Competition	Venue	Position	Event	Notes
1998	World Junior Championships	Annecy, France	17th (q)	Discus	49.14 m
1998	World Junior Championships	Annecy, France	5th	Javelin	69.17 m
2001	World Championships	Edmonton, Canada	13th (q)	Javelin	81.66 m
2001	Universiade	Beijing, China	10th	Javelin	70.99 m
2002	Commonwealth Games	Manchester, United Kingdom	2nd	Javelin	78.63 m
2005	World Championships	Helsinki, Finland	12th	Javelin	68.59 m
2006	Commonwealth Games	Melbourne, Australia	8th	Javelin	73.88 m
2007	World Championships	Osaka, Japan	23rd (q)	Javelin	77.54 m
2008	Olympic Games	Beijing, China	10th	Javelin	80.90 m
2011	World Championships	Daegu, South Korea	19th (q)	Javelin	77.49 m

== Seasonal bests by year ==
- 1998 - 75.46
- 1999 - 76.80
- 2000 - 78.94
- 2001 - 81.66
- 2002 - 79.85
- 2003 - 81.56
- 2004 - 77.87
- 2005 - 84.41
- 2006 - 79.55
- 2007 - 83.98
- 2008 - 83.20
- 2009 - 75.08
- 2011 - 84.81
- 2012 - 80.60

== See also ==
- Canadian records in track and field
