= 1996 World Junior Championships in Athletics – Men's javelin throw =

The men's javelin throw event at the 1996 World Junior Championships in Athletics was held in Sydney, Australia, at International Athletic Centre on 23 and 25 August.

== Medalists ==
Gold	Sergey Voynov; Uzbekistan
Silver	Harri Haatainen; Finland
Bronze	Steven Madeo; Australia

== Results ==
=== Final ===
25 August

Rank	Name	Nationality	Attempts						Result	Notes
Rank	Name	Nationality	1	2	3	4	5	6	Result	Notes
1st place, gold medalist(s)	Sergey Voynov	Uzbekistan	75.58	76.56	x	72.76	79.78	75.26	79.78	
2nd place, silver medalist(s)	Harri Haatainen	Finland	71.54	70.90	x	73.46	73.52	76.12	76.12	
3rd place, bronze medalist(s)	Steven Madeo	Australia	73.88	66.76	70.82	-	x	70.60	73.88	
4	Juha Aarnio	Finland	70.54	71.18	69.46	x	x	73.10	73.10	
5	Johan Vosloo	South Africa	71.96	x	67.76	x	x	66.66	71.96	
6	Ju Ki-Young	South Korea	71.60	x	70.40	70.38	-	x	71.60	
7	Christian Fusenig	Germany	x	x	67.72	x	69.84	x	69.84	
8	Ola Larsen Pramm	Norway	58.50	64.38	69.58	64.22	63.38	x	69.58	
9	Troy Burkholder	United States	65.66	67.28	x				67.28	
10	Igor Lisovskiy	Belarus	66.78	63.88	65.28				66.78	
11	Andrew Hawthorne	Australia	64.28	x	65.20				65.20	
12	Didier Richard	France	x	60.40	x				60.40	

=== Qualifications ===
23 Aug

==== Group A ====
Rank	Name	Nationality	Attempts			Result	Notes
Rank	Name	Nationality	1	2	3	Result	Notes
1	Sergey Voynov	Uzbekistan	76.44	-	-	76.44	Q
2	Steven Madeo	Australia	75.74	-	-	75.74	Q
3	Ju Ki-Young	South Korea	x	71.10	-	71.10	Q
4	Harri Haatainen	Finland	70.92	-	-	70.92	Q
5	Johan Vosloo	South Africa	64.96	63.80	70.90	70.90	Q
6	Igor Lisovskiy	Belarus	67.30	66.44	69.30	69.30	q
7	Steffen Schwinn	Germany	67.66	x	66.50	67.66	
8	Radek Pejrimovský	Czech Republic	67.28	63.66	x	67.28	
9	David Parker	United Kingdom	64.08	x	63.18	64.08	
10	Shen Wanggen	China	57.90	63.38	63.00	63.38	
11	Arman Mikhtaryan	Armenia	57.68	56.20	59.02	59.02	
12	John Hetzendorf	United States	57.06	55.40	x	57.06	

==== Group B ====
Rank	Name	Nationality	Attempts			Result	Notes
Rank	Name	Nationality	1	2	3	Result	Notes
1	Christian Fusenig	Germany	74.08	-	-	74.08	Q
2	Juha Aarnio	Finland	71.84	-	-	71.84	Q
3	Troy Burkholder	United States	70.44	-	-	70.44	Q
4	Andrew Hawthorne	Australia	69.36	67.52	x	69.36	q
5	Ola Larsen Pramm	Norway	68.82	63.12	62.76	68.82	q
6	Didier Richard	France	65.58	x	68.78	68.78	q
7	Lim Sang-Sup	South Korea	65.06	63.72	64.32	65.06	
8	László Majoros	Hungary	64.66	58.90	58.60	64.66	
9	Francesco Pignata	Italy	61.74	x	x	61.74	
10	Vedran Kadric	Bosnia and Herzegovina	57.76	55.60	56.10	57.76	
11	Andrus Värnik	Estonia	x	x	56.94	56.94	
12	Sidro Tebuteb	Northern Mariana Islands	42.98	44.80	46.96	46.96	

== Participation ==
According to an unofficial count, 24 athletes from 19 countries participated in the event.

- Armenia (1)
- Australia (2)
- Belarus (1)
- Bosnia and Herzegovina (1)
- China (1)
- Czech Republic (1)
- Estonia (1)
- Finland (2)
- France (1)
- Germany (2)
- Hungary (1)
- Italy (1)
- Northern Mariana Islands (1)
- Norway (1)
- South Africa (1)
- South Korea (2)
- United Kingdom (1)
- United States (2)
- Uzbekistan (1)
