= 2005 Asian Athletics Championships – Men's javelin throw =

The men's javelin throw event at the 2005 Asian Athletics Championships was held in Incheon, South Korea on September 3.

== Results ==
Rank	Name	Nationality	Result	Notes
1st place, gold medalist(s)	Li Rongxiang	China	78.28	
2nd place, silver medalist(s)	Jung Sang-Jin	South Korea	76.85	
3rd place, bronze medalist(s)	Jagdish Bishnoi	India	74.83	
4	Ayoub Arakhi	Iran	74.77	PB
5	Chu Ki-Young	South Korea	74.72	
6	Yukifumi Murakami	Japan	74.65	
7	Chen Qi	China	74.37	
8	An Hyuk-Yun	South Korea	74.36	
9	Chou Yi-Chen	Chinese Taipei	71.23	
10	Firas Zaal Al-Mohammed	Syria	70.40	
11	Danilo Fresnido	Philippines	66.60	
12	Harshana Gunathilake	Sri Lanka	64.80	
13	Rinat Tarzumanov	Uzbekistan	64.70	
14	Abdullah Al-Omeiri	Kuwait	64.00	
15	Wisam Al-Khizai	Iraq	63.38	
16	Thirdsak Boonjansri	Thailand	62.28	
17	Ma Kam Cheong	Macau	48.64	PB
	Kazuki Yamamoto	Japan	NM	
