= Athletics at the 1998 Asian Games – Men's javelin throw =

Men's javelin throw at the 1998 Asian Games
- Venue: Thammasat Stadium
- Dates: 19 December 1998
- Competitors: 13 from 9 nations

Medalists
gold medal	Sergey Voynov	Uzbekistan
silver medal	Zhang Lianbiao	China
bronze medal	Li Rongxiang	China

The men's javelin throw competition at the 1998 Asian Games in Bangkok, Thailand was held on 19 December at the Thammasat Stadium.

== Schedule ==
All times are Indochina Time (UTC+07:00)

Date	Time	Event
Saturday, 19 December 1998	14:00	Final

== Results ==
Legend

- NM — No mark

Rank	Athlete	Result	Notes
1st place, gold medalist(s)	Sergey Voynov (UZB)	79.70	
2nd place, silver medalist(s)	Zhang Lianbiao (CHN)	78.58	
3rd place, bronze medalist(s)	Li Rongxiang (CHN)	78.57	
4	Toru Ue (JPN)	77.49	
5	Yu Nam-sung (KOR)	75.53	
6	Satbir Singh Saran (IND)	75.21	
7	Mikio Tamura (JPN)	72.39	
8	Jagdish Bishnoi (IND)	72.03	
9	Khurshid Ahmed Khan (NEP)	69.06	
10	Firas Al-Mahamid (SYR)	64.19	
11	Surat Klaitook (THA)	59.30	
—	Jaber Shahabi (QAT)	NM	
—	Ahmed Abu Jalala (QAT)	NM	
