= Sergey Voynov =

Uzbekistani javelin thrower

Personal information
- Born: February 26, 1977 (age 49)

Sport
- Sport: Track and field
Medal record
Representing Uzbekistan
Asian Games
Gold medal – first place	1998 Bangkok	Javelin throw
Bronze medal – third place	2002 Busan	Javelin throw
Asian Championships
Silver medal – second place	2002 Colombo	Javelin throw
Bronze medal – third place	1995 Jakarta	Javelin throw
Bronze medal – third place	2003 Manila	Javelin throw

Sergey Sergeyevich Voynov (Uzbek: Сергей Сергеевич Войьнов; born February 26, 1977) is an Uzbek athlete who competes in the javelin throw. His personal best throw is 84.80 metres, achieved in 2000.

== Achievements ==
Year	Competition	Venue	Position	Notes
Representing Uzbekistan
1994	Asian Junior Championships	Jakarta, Indonesia	3rd	71.86 m
1994	World Junior Championships	Lisbon, Portugal	4th	72.74 m
1995	Asian Championships	Jakarta, Indonesia	3rd	73.46 m
1995	Universiade	Fukuoka, Japan	8th	72.88 m
1996	Olympic Games	Atlanta, United States	24th (q)	76.30 m
1996	World Junior Championships	Sydney, Australia	1st	79.78 m
1997	World Championships	Athens, Greece	27th (q)	74.32 m
1998	Asian Games	Bangkok, Thailand	1st	79.70 m
1999	World Championships	Seville, Spain	19th (q)	77.35 m
2000	Olympic Games	Sydney, Australia	25th (q)	75.89 m
2001	World Championships	Edmonton, Canada	23rd (q)	76.77 m
2002	Asian Championships	Colombo, Sri Lanka	2nd	79.70 m
2002	Asian Games	Busan, South Korea	3rd	78.74 m
2003	World Championships	Paris, France	15th (q)	76.66 m
2003	Asian Championships	Manila, Philippines	3rd	76.09 m
2004	Olympic Games	Athens, Greece	24th (q)	74.68 m
2006	Asian Games	Doha, Qatar	9th	66.89 m

- 1999 Central Asian Games - gold medal
- 1997 Central Asian Games - gold medal

== Seasonal bests by year ==
- 1994 - 72.74
- 1996 - 81.80
- 1997 - 78.04
- 1998 - 79.70
- 1999 - 83.12
- 2000 - 84.80
- 2001 - 82.71
- 2002 - 81.25
- 2003 - 79.06
- 2004 - 78.36
- 2005 - 76.12
- 2006 - 71.34
