= Dimitrios Polymerou =

Greek javelin thrower

Personal information
- Born: May 17, 1974 (age 52) Drama, Greece

Sport
- Sport: Track and field
Medal record
Representing Greece
Mediterranean Games
Silver medal – second place	1997 Bari	Javelin throw

Dimitrios Polymerou (Greek: Δημήτριος Πολυμέρου; born May 17, 1974) is a retired male javelin thrower from Greece, who represented his native country at the 1996 Summer Olympics in Atlanta, Georgia. He set his personal best (81.20 metres) on August 1, 1999, at a meet in Patras.

== Achievements ==
Year	Competition	Venue	Position	Notes
Representing Greece
1993	European Junior Championships	San Sebastián, Spain	1st	72.80 m
1995	Universiade	Fukuoka, Japan	7th	72.98 m
1996	Olympic Games	Atlanta, United States	19th (q)	77.82 m
1997	Mediterranean Games	Bari, Italy	2nd	77.88 m
1997	World Championships	Athens, Greece	25th (q)	74.94 m
1998	European Championships	Budapest, Hungary	17th (q)	77.49 m
2001	Mediterranean Games	Radès, Tunisia	4th	75.46 m
