= Anier Boué =

Cuban javelin thrower

Personal information
- Nationality: Cuba
- Born: 3 April 1984 (age 42) La Lisa, La Habana, Cuba
- Height: 1.92 m (6 ft 3 1/2 in)
- Weight: 87 kg (192 lb)

Sport
- Sport: Athletics
- Event: Javelin throw
Medal record
Men's athletics
Representing Cuba
CAC Championships
Gold medal – first place	2008 Cali	Javelin throw

Anier Boué (born April 3, 1984) is a Cuban javelin thrower. Shortly before the Olympics, he had won two gold medals in his category at the Central American and Caribbean Championships in Cali, Colombia, and also at the Ibero-American Championships in Iquique, Chile.

Boué represented Cuba at the 2008 Summer Olympics, where he competed in the men's javelin throw. He placed fifteenth for the first group, and twenty-eighth overall in the qualifying rounds, with a throw of 71.85 metres, failing to advance into the finals.

Boue threw his personal best of 80.53 metres at a national meet in his home city of Havana.

== Personal best ==
- Javelin throw: 80.53 m – (Cuba) La Habana, 21 June 2007

== Achievements ==
Year	Competition	Venue	Position	Event	Notes
Representing Cuba
2005	ALBA Games	La Habana, Cuba	5th	Javelin	72.42 m
2007	ALBA Games	Caracas, Venezuela	2nd	Javelin	79.14 m
2008	Ibero-American Championships	Iquique, Chile	1st	Javelin	78.77 m
2008	Central American and Caribbean Championships	Cali, Colombia	1st	Javelin	74.98 m
2008	Olympic Games	Beijing, China	28th (q)	Javelin	71.85 m
