= Park Jae-myong =

South Korean javelin thrower (born 1981)

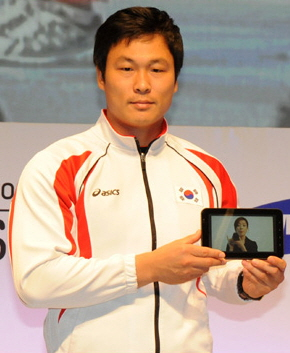
- Samsung Electronics How to PLAY SMART Campaign Presentation

Medal record

Men's athletics

Representing South Korea

Asian Championships
Silver medal – second place	2007 Amman	Javelin throw
Bronze medal – third place	2002 Colombo	Javelin throw

Park Jae-myong (Korean: 박재명; born 15 December 1981) is a South Korean javelin thrower. His personal best throw is 83.99 metres, achieved in March 2004 in Wellington. This is the current South Korean record.

== Achievements ==
Year	Competition	Venue	Position	Notes
Representing South Korea
1999	Asian Junior Championships	Singapore	3rd	68.05 m
2000	World Junior Championships	Santiago, Chile	3rd	72.36 m
2001	East Asian Games	Osaka, Japan	3rd	71.44 m
2001	Universiade	Beijing, China	13th (q)	69.83 m
2002	Asian Championships	Colombo, Sri Lanka	3rd	79.22 m
2002	Asian Games	Busan, South Korea	4th	78.27 m
2003	Universiade	Daegu, South Korea	4th	74.72 m
2003	Asian Championships	Manila, Philippines	4th	72.55 m
2003	Afro-Asian Games	Hyderabad, India	5th	73.10 m
2004	Olympic Games	Athens, Greece	29th (q)	72.70 m
2006	Asian Games	Doha, Qatar	1st	79.30 m
2007	Asian Championships	Amman, Jordan	2nd	75.77 m
2008	Olympic Games	Beijing, China	17th	76.63 m
2009	Universiade	Belgrade, Serbia	3rd	79.29 m
2009	World Championships	Berlin, Germany	18th (q)	78.16 m
2010	Asian Games	Guangzhou, China	2nd	79.92 m
2011	Asian Championships	Kobe, Japan	2nd	80.19 m
2014	Asian Games	Incheon, South Korea	8th	74.68 m

== Seasonal bests by year ==
- 2000 – 75.87
- 2001 – 76.00
- 2002 – 80.96
- 2003 – 81.46
- 2004 – 83.99
- 2005 – 78.87
- 2006 – 79.96
- 2007 – 80.38
- 2008 – 81.42
- 2009 – 83.10
- 2010 – 80.11
- 2011 – 80.19
- 2012 – 78.60
- 2013 – 79.71
- 2014 – 78.69
