= Yelena Baltabayeva =

Kazakhstani shot putter

Personal information
- Nationality: Kazakhstani
- Born: 5 November 1962 (age 63)

Sport
- Sport: Athletics
- Event: Shot put
Medal record
Women's athletics
Representing Kazakhstan
Asian Championships
| Bronze medal – third place | 1995 Jakarta | Shot put |

Yelena Baltabayeva (born 5 November 1962) is a Kazakhstani athlete. She competed in the women's shot put at the 1996 Summer Olympics.
