= Roman Poltoratsky =

Uzbekistani athlete (born 1972)

Personal information
- Nationality: Uzbekistani
- Born: 22 July 1972 (age 53)

Sport
- Sport: Athletics
- Event: Discus throw
Medal record
Men's athletics
Representing Uzbekistan
Asian Championships
Silver medal – second place	1995 Jakarta	Discus throw

Roman Geraldovich Poltoraskiy (born 22 July 1972) is an Uzbekistani athlete. He competed in the men's discus throw at the 1996 Summer Olympics and the 2000 Summer Olympics.

In 1995, at the Championship of Uzbekistan in athletics, he threw a discus at 61 meters and won first place. At the Asian Athletics Championships in Jakarta (Indonesia), he won a silver medal in the discus throw with a score of 57.36 meters.
