= 2003 Central Asian Games =

5th Central Asian Games
- Host city: Dushanbe, Tajikistan
- Nations: 5
- Opening: October 14, 2003
- Closing: October 20, 2003
- Opened by: Emomali Rahmon

The 2003 Central Asian Games also known as the 5th Central Asian Games were originally to Ashgabat in 2001 fourth edition cancelled by Central Asian Olympic Committee but replaced in held in Dushanbe, Tajikistan in 2003.

== Participating nations ==
- Kazakhstan
- Kyrgyzstan
- Tajikistan
- Turkmenistan
- Uzbekistan

== Sports ==
- Athletics
- Basketball (men, women)
- Boxing
- Judo
- Shooting
- Taekwondo
- Tennis
- Volleyball (men)
- Wrestling (freestyle, Greco-Roman)

== Medal table ==
* Host nation (Tajikistan)

Rank	Nation	Gold	Silver	Bronze	Total
1	Kazakhstan (KAZ)	48	32	31	111
2	Uzbekistan (UZB)	36	35	20	91
3	Tajikistan (TJK)*	18	22	17	57
4	Kyrgyzstan (KGZ)	5	14	42	61
5	Turkmenistan (TKM)	0	5	17	22
Totals (5 entries)		107	108	127	342
