= Yukifumi Murakami =

Japanese javelin thrower (born 1979)

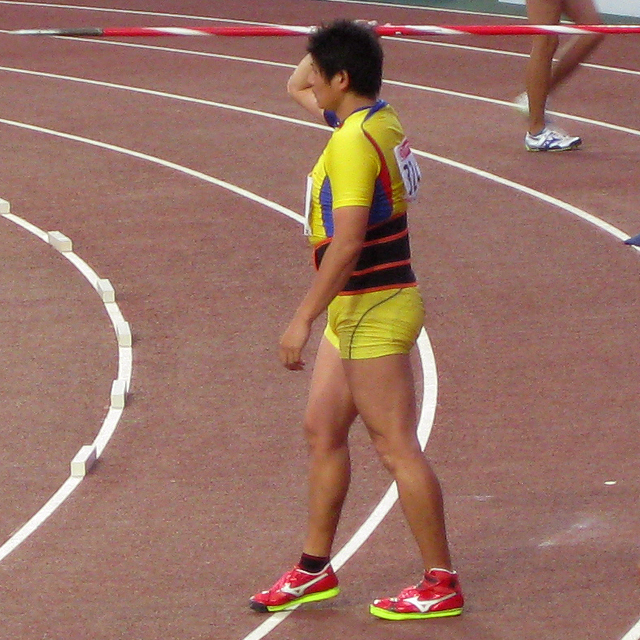
- At the 2012 Japan Championships in Athletics

Personal information
- Nationality: Japanese
- Born: December 23, 1979 (age 46) Kamijima, Ehime
- Height: 1.85 m (6 ft 1 in)
- Weight: 97 kg (214 lb)

Sport
- Country: Japan
- Sport: Track and field
- Event: Javelin throw
- Club: Suzuki Hamamatsu Athlete Club

Achievements and titles
- Personal best(s): Javelin throw: 85.96 m (29 April 2013)
Medal record
Men's athletics
Representing Japan
World Championships
Bronze medal – third place	2009 Berlin	Javelin
Asian Games
Gold medal – first place	2010 Guangzhou	Javelin
Silver medal – second place	2002 Busan	Javelin
Silver medal – second place	2006 Doha	Javelin
Asian Championships
Gold medal – first place	2009 Guangzhou	Javelin
Gold medal – first place	2011 Kobe	Javelin
Silver medal – second place	2003 Manila	Javelin
Bronze medal – third place	2015 Wuhan	Javelin
East Asian Games
Silver medal – second place	2001 Osaka	Javelin
World Junior Championship
Bronze medal – third place	1998 Annecy	Javelin
Asian Junior Championship
Silver medal – second place	1997 Bangkok	Javelin

Yukifumi Murakami (村上 幸史, Murakami Yukifumi; born 23 December 1979 in Kamijima, Ehime) is a Japanese javelin thrower. He was the first Japanese athlete to win a World Championship medal in the javelin, taking bronze at the 2009 edition with a throw of 82.97 metres.

He was successful as a junior athlete and won the bronze medal in the javelin at the 1998 World Junior Championships in Athletics. He established himself as one of Asia's top throwers in the following years, winning silver medals at the 2001 East Asian Games, 2002 Asian Games, and the 2003 Asian Athletics Championships.

His first global appearance was at the 2004 Summer Olympics and he finished 18th overall in the final rankings. The 2005 World Championships in Athletics was his next major tournament where he could only finish in 27th place with a disappointing throw of 68.31 m. He was runner-up for a second time at the 2006 Asian Games and took part in the 2008 Summer Olympics two years later.

Murakami was voted the Japanese athlete of the year for 2009 by both Rikujyo Kyougi Magazine (Track and Field Magazine of Japan) and the Japan Association of Athletics Federations. These awards capped a decade of national dominance – with ten consecutive wins, he won the javelin at every national championships in the 2000s. His performance at the 2009 World Championships included a personal best of 83.10 m to qualify for the final, and 82.97 m to win the bronze medal – his second best ever throw. He finished the year with a gold medal performance at the 2009 Asian Athletics Championships.

He started 2010 with a throw of 82.49 m in Wakayama in April – his longest throw achieved in Japan. He extended his consecutive national title run to eleven in June, out-throwing Nobuhiro Sato by four metres.

On April 29, 2013, he extended his personal best by more than 2 meters to 85.96, more than 1 meter longer than the London Olympic winning throw, and 2nd best by a Japanese javelin thrower after Kazuhiro Mizoguchi.

== International competitions ==
Representing Japan
Year	Competition	Venue	Position	Notes
1997	Asian Junior Championships	Bangkok, Thailand	2nd	71.18 m
1998	World Junior Championships	Annecy, France	3rd	70.72 m
2001	East Asian Games	Osaka, Japan	2nd	76.36 m
2001	Universiade	Beijing, China	7th	71.75 m
2002	Asian Games	Busan, South Korea	2nd	78.77 m
2003	Asian Championships	Manila, Philippines	2nd	77.04 m
2004	Olympic Games	Athens, Greece	18th (q)	78.59 m
2005	World Championships	Helsinki, Finland	27th (q)	68.31 m
2005	Asian Championships	Incheon, South Korea	6th	74.65 m
2006	Asian Games	Doha, Qatar	2nd	78.15 m
2007	World Championships	Osaka, Japan	21st (q)	77.63 m
2008	Olympic Games	Beijing, China	15th (q)	78.21 m
2009	World Championships	Berlin, Germany	3rd	82.97 m
2009	Asian Championships	Guangzhou, China	1st	81.50 m
2010	Asian Games	Guangzhou, China	1st	83.15 m
2011	Asian Championships	Kobe, Japan	1st	83.27 m
2011	World Championships	Daegu, South Korea	14th (q)	80.19 m
2012	Olympic Games	London, United Kingdom	24th (q)	77.80 m
2013	World Championships	Moscow, Russia	22nd (q)	77.75 m
2014	Asian Games	Incheon, South Korea	4th	81.66 m
2015	Asian Championships	Wuhan, China	3rd	79.05 m

== Seasonal bests by year ==
- 1997 - 76.54
- 1998 - 73.62
- 1999 - 71.70
- 2000 - 78.57
- 2001 - 80.59
- 2002 - 78.77
- 2003 - 78.98
- 2004 - 81.71
- 2005 - 79.79
- 2006 - 78.54
- 2007 - 79.85
- 2008 - 79.71
- 2009 - 83.10
- 2010 - 83.15
- 2011 - 83.53
- 2012 - 83.95
- 2013 - 85.96
- 2014 - 81.66
- 2015 - 79.05
