= Boris Kaveshnikov =

Kyrgyzstani middle-distance runner

Personal information
- Full name: Boris Veniaminovich Kaveshnikov
- Nationality: Kyrgyzstani; Russian
- Born: 30 September 1974 (age 52)

Sport
- Sport: Middle-distance running
- Event: 800 metres

Boris Veniaminovich Kaveshnikov (born 30 September 1974) is a Russian-Kyrgyzstani former middle-distance runner. He competed in the men's 800 metres at the 1996 Summer Olympics. He became a Russian citizen in 2000.

== See also ==
- List of eligibility transfers in athletics
