= Chu Ki-young =

South Korean javelin thrower

Personal information
- Born: March 4, 1977 (age 49) Seoul, South Korea

Sport
- Sport: Track and field
Medal record
Representing South Korea
Asian Championships
Silver medal – second place	2000 Jakarta	Javelin throw
East Asian Games
Bronze medal – third place	2005 Macau	Javelin throw

Chu Ki-Young (Korean: 추기영; born March 4, 1977) is a retired male javelin thrower from South Korea, who represented his native country at the 1996 Summer Olympics in Atlanta, Georgia. He set his personal best (78.92 metres) on May 2, 2002 at a meet in Gimcheon.

== Achievements ==
Year	Competition	Venue	Position	Notes
Representing South Korea
1996	Olympic Games	Atlanta, United States	31st (q)	71.42 m
1997	World Championships	Athens, Greece	31st (q)	70.84 m
1997	Summer Universiade	Catania, Italy	8th	72.34 m
2000	Asian Championships	Jakarta, Indonesia	2nd	75.27 m
2002	Asian Games	Busan, South Korea	5th	76.91 m
2005	Asian Championships	Incheon, South Korea	5th	74.72 m
2005	East Asian Games	Macau, PR China	3rd	75.59 m
