= Valeriy Borisov =

Kazakhstani racewalker (born 1966)

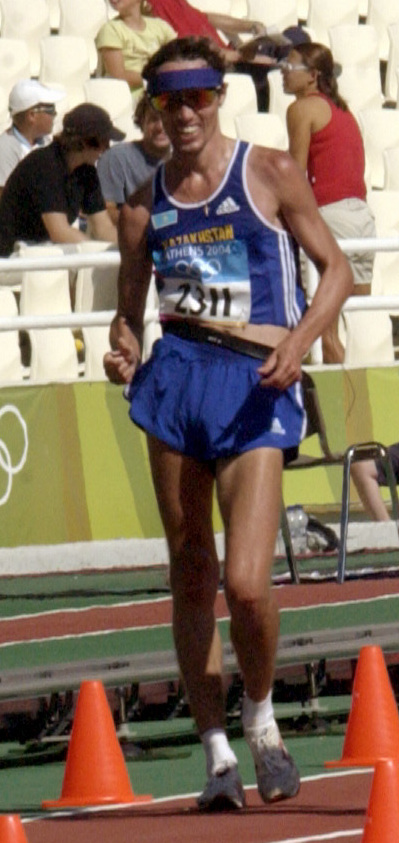
- Valeriy Borisov in 2004

Medal record

Men's athletics

Representing Kazakhstan

Asian Championships
Bronze medal – third place	1998 Fukuoka	20 km walk

Valery Aleksandrovich Borisov (Russian: Валерий Александрович Борисов; born 18 September 1966 in Temirtau, Karaganda Region) is a male race walker from Kazakhstan.

== Achievements ==
Year	Competition	Venue	Position	Notes
Representing Kazakhstan
1993	World Championships	Stuttgart, Germany	DNF	20 km
1994	Asian Games	Hiroshima, Japan	3rd	20 km
1995	World Championships	Gothenburg, Sweden	23rd	20 km
1996	Olympic Games	Atlanta, United States	18th	20 km
1997	World Championships	Athens, Greece	35th	20 km
1998	Asian Championships	Fukuoka, Japan	3rd	20 km
1998	Asian Games	Bangkok, Thailand	2nd	20 km
1999	World Championships	Seville, Spain	21st	20 km
2000	Olympic Games	Sydney, Australia	38th	20 km
2000	Olympic Games	Sydney, Australia	25th	50 km
2002	Asian Games	Busan, South Korea	1st	20 km
2003	World Championships	Paris, France	DSQ	20 km
2004	Olympic Games	Athens, Greece	27th	20 km
