= Alberto Desiderio =

Italian javelin thrower

Personal information
- National team: Italy: 13 caps (1996-2004)
- Born: 26 March 1973 (age 53) Catania, Italy
- Height: 1.86 m (6 ft 1 in)
- Weight: 85 kg (187 lb)

Sport
- Sport: Athletics
- Event: Javelin throw
- Club: Libertas Catania
- Retired: 2006

Achievements and titles
- Personal best: Javelin throw: 80.80 m (2001)

Alberto Desiderio (born 26 March 1973) is a former Italian javelin thrower.

His personal bests, 80.80 m set in 2001, at the end of the 2020 outdoor season is still the 5th best all-time performance of the Italian lists and in that year it was also the 46th best result in the world top-lists.

== National titles ==
Desiderio won six national championships at individual senior level.

- Italian Athletics Championships
  - Javelin throw: 2001 (1)
- Italian Winter Throwing Championships
  - Javelin throw: 1997, 1999, 2001, 2002, 2003 (5)

== See also ==
- Italian all-time top lists - Javelin throw
