= 1995 Central Asian Games =

I Central Asian Games
- Host city: (Uzbekistan) Tashkent
- Nations: 5
- Sport: 12
- Opening: 1 September
- Closing: 8 September
- Opened by: Islam Karimov
- Main venue: Pakhtakor Markaziy Stadium

The 1995 Central Asian Games also known as the I Central Asian Games were held in Tashkent, Uzbekistan in 1995.

== Participating nations ==
- Kazakhstan (171)
- Kyrgyzstan
- Tajikistan
- Turkmenistan
- Uzbekistan

== Sports ==
- Athletics
- Basketball (men, women)
- Boxing
- Cycling
- Fencing
- Shooting
- Swimming
- Tennis
- Volleyball (men, women)
- Weightlifting
- Wrestling
  - Freestyle
  - Greco-Roman

== Medal table ==
* Host nation (Uzbekistan)

Rank	Nation	Gold	Silver	Bronze	Total
1	Kazakhstan (KAZ)	76	62	30	168
2	Uzbekistan (UZB)*	65	66	49	180
3	Kyrgyzstan (KGZ)	13	14	40	67
4	Turkmenistan (TKM)	2	12	26	40
5	Tajikistan (TJK)	2	2	11	15
Totals (5 entries)		158	156	156	470
