= 1997 Central Asian Games =

II Central Asian Games
- Host city: (Kazakhstan) Alma-Ata
- Nations: 5
- Sport: 13
- Events: 173
- Opening: 13 September
- Closing: 20 September
- Opened by: Nursultan Nazarbayev
- Main venue: Almaty Central Stadium

The 1997 Central Asian Games also known as the II Central Asian Games were held in Alma-Ata, Kazakhstan in 1997.

== Participating nations ==
- Kazakhstan
- Kyrgyzstan
- Tajikistan
- Turkmenistan
- Uzbekistan

== Sports ==
- Athletics
- Basketball (men, women)
- Boxing
- Cycling
- Fencing
- Judo
- Shooting
- Swimming
- Tennis
- Volleyball (men, women)
- Weightlifting
- Wrestling
  - Freestyle
  - Greco-Roman

== Medal table ==
* Host nation (Kazakhstan)

Rank	Nation	Gold	Silver	Bronze	Total
1	Kazakhstan (KAZ)*	125	70	34	229
2	Uzbekistan (UZB)	35	63	59	157
3	Kyrgyzstan (KGZ)	13	36	57	106
4	Turkmenistan (TKM)	0	2	21	23
5	Tajikistan (TJK)	0	2	12	14
Totals (5 entries)		173	173	183	529
