= Mats Nilsson (javelin thrower) =

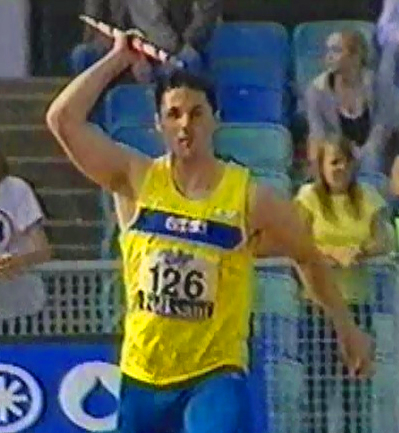
- Mats Nilsson, 2004

Personal information
- Full name: Mats Inge Nilsson
- Nationality: Swedish
- Born: Tyresö, Stockholm County
- Height: 178 cm (5 ft 10 in)
- Weight: 180 lb (82 kg; 12 st 12 lb)
- Relative: Joakim Nilsson (brother)

Sport
- Country: Sweden
- Sport: Track and field
- Event: Javelin
- Club: Klippans FK
- Retired: 2005

Achievements and titles
- Personal best: 77.14 m
Medal record
Men's Athletics NCAA
Gold medal – first place	1997 Bloomington, IN	Javelin
Silver medal – second place	1996 Eugene, OR	Javelin
Bronze medal – third place	1998 Buffalo, NY	Javelin

Mats Nilsson is a 4-time male javelin thrower who competed for the University of Alabama (1995–1998), the University of Texas at El Paso (2000–2001), and the Swedish National Team (1991–2004). He was ranked top-10 in the world as a junior, a perennial medalist at the Swedish Championships, and became Crimson Tide's first NCAA champion in the javelin throw in history. Mats Nilsson received his PhD in exercise physiology.

He is the younger brother of Joakim Nilsson.

== Progression ==
- 1989: 48.80 m/160.1 ft (600 g)
- 1990: 63.02 m/206.7 ft (600 g)
- 1991: 72.22 m/236.9 ft (600 g), 65.90 m/216.2 (700 g); EYOD Silver Medalist European Youth Olympic Festival
- 1992: 61 m/200.1 ft (800 g)
- 1993: 66.72 m/218.8 ft (800 g)
- 1994: 70.14 m/230.1 ft (800 g); Junior World Championships 9th place
- 1995: 72.20 m/236.8 ft (800 g)
- 1996: 76.66 m/251.5 ft (800 g); NCAA Silver Medalist, SEC Gold Medalist
- 1997: 77.14 m/253.08 ft (800 g); NCAA Gold Medalist, SEC Gold Medalist, M22 European Championships 10th place

== Other ==
- Ranked top-100 in the world 1996, 1997, 1998, 2003, and 2004 with the 800 g javelin
- "All-American" 1996, 1997, 1998, 2000
- WAC Champion 2000
- Medalist Swedish Championships 1990, 1991, 1992, 1994, 1996, 1997, 2003, and 2004
