= Dmitry Shnayder =

Kyrgyzstani javelin thrower

Personal information
- Nationality: Kyrgyzstani
- Born: 30 May 1976 (age 50)

Sport
- Sport: Athletics
- Event: Javelin throw

Dmitry Shnayder (born 30 May 1976) is a Kyrgyzstani former athlete. He competed in the men's javelin throw at the 2000 Summer Olympics.
