= 1999 Central Asian Games =

3rd Central Asian Games
- Nations: 6
- Opening: October 1
- Closing: October 7
- Opened by: Askar Akayev

The 1999 Central Asian Games also known as the 3rd Central Asian Games were held in Bishkek, Kyrgyzstan.

Chinese Taipei was invited to this edition.

== Participating nations ==
- Chinese Taipei
- Kazakhstan
- Kyrgyzstan
- Tajikistan
- Turkmenistan
- Uzbekistan

== Sports ==
- Athletics
- Basketball (men, women)
- Boxing
- Cycling
- Fencing
- Judo
- Shooting
- Swimming
- Tennis
- Weightlifting

== Medal table ==
* Host nation (Kyrgyzstan)

Rank	Nation	Gold	Silver	Bronze	Total
1	Kazakhstan (KAZ)	119	68	34	221
2	Kyrgyzstan (KGZ)*	27	58	59	144
3	Uzbekistan (UZB)	17	28	30	75
4	Turkmenistan (TKM)	0	6	25	31
5	Tajikistan (TJK)	0	2	10	12
Totals (5 entries)		163	162	158	483
