= 1999 European Athletics U23 Championships – Men's javelin throw =

The men's javelin throw event at the 1999 European Athletics U23 Championships was held in Gothenburg, Sweden, at Ullevi on 31 July 1999.

== Medalists ==
Gold	Harri Haatainen; Finland
Silver	Ville Räsänen; Finland
Bronze	Mark Frank; Germany

== Results ==
=== Final ===
31 July

Rank	Name	Nationality	Attempts						Result	Notes
Rank	Name	Nationality	1	2	3	4	5	6	Result	Notes
1st place, gold medalist(s)	Harri Haatainen	Finland	76.59	79.87	78.90	81.74	79.47	83.02	83.02	CR
2nd place, silver medalist(s)	Ville Räsänen	Finland	78.36	x	x	68.73	76.56	–	78.36	
3rd place, bronze medalist(s)	Mark Frank	Germany	76.37	72.95	77.62	x	73.14	75.08	77.62	
4	Manuel Nau	Germany	x	72.99	69.09	69.03	76.12	73.62	76.12	
5	Kęstutis Celiešius	Lithuania	74.67	65.75	69.38	x	x	69.03	74.67	
6	Christian Fusenig	Germany	73.96	73.52	67.80	73.13	x	x	73.96	
7	Pavel Stasyuk	Belarus	x	72.47	69.99	x	70.74	67.95	72.47	
8	Teemu Pasanen	Finland	68.84	71.58	72.07	x	71.17	x	72.07	
9	Marián Bokor	Slovakia	70.53	x	70.69				70.69	
10	Pieros Tsiosis	Cyprus	68.08	63.42	63.07				68.08	
11	Gustavo Dacal	Spain	x	67.23	65.86				67.23	
12	Igor Lisovskiy	Belarus	66.83	65.79	63.81				66.83	
13	Francesco Pignata	Italy	62.33	x	65.86				65.86	
14	Andrus Värnik	Estonia	60.76	58.23	63.04				63.04	

== Participation ==
According to an unofficial count, 14 athletes from 9 countries participated in the event.

- Belarus (2)
- Cyprus (1)
- Estonia (1)
- Finland (3)
- Germany (3)
- Italy (1)
- Lithuania (1)
- Slovakia (1)
- Spain (1)
