= 2017 NHL entry draft =

2017 North American ice hockey draft

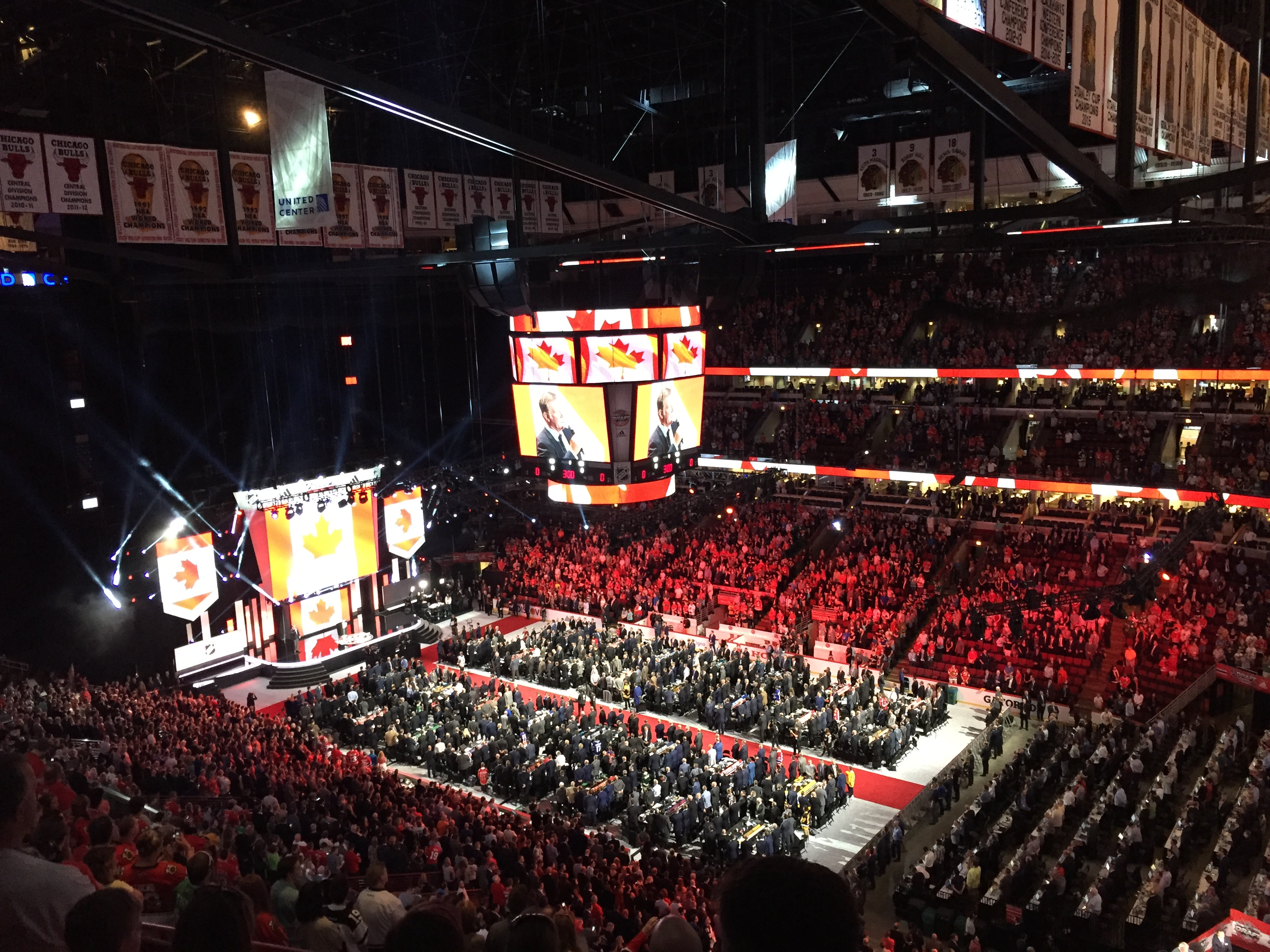
- United Center during the draft

General information
- Date: June 23–24, 2017
- Location: United Center; Chicago, Illinois, U.S.
- Networks: Sportsnet (Canada); NBCSN (United States)

Overview
- 217 total selections in 7 rounds
- First selection: (Switzerland) Nico Hischier (New Jersey Devils)

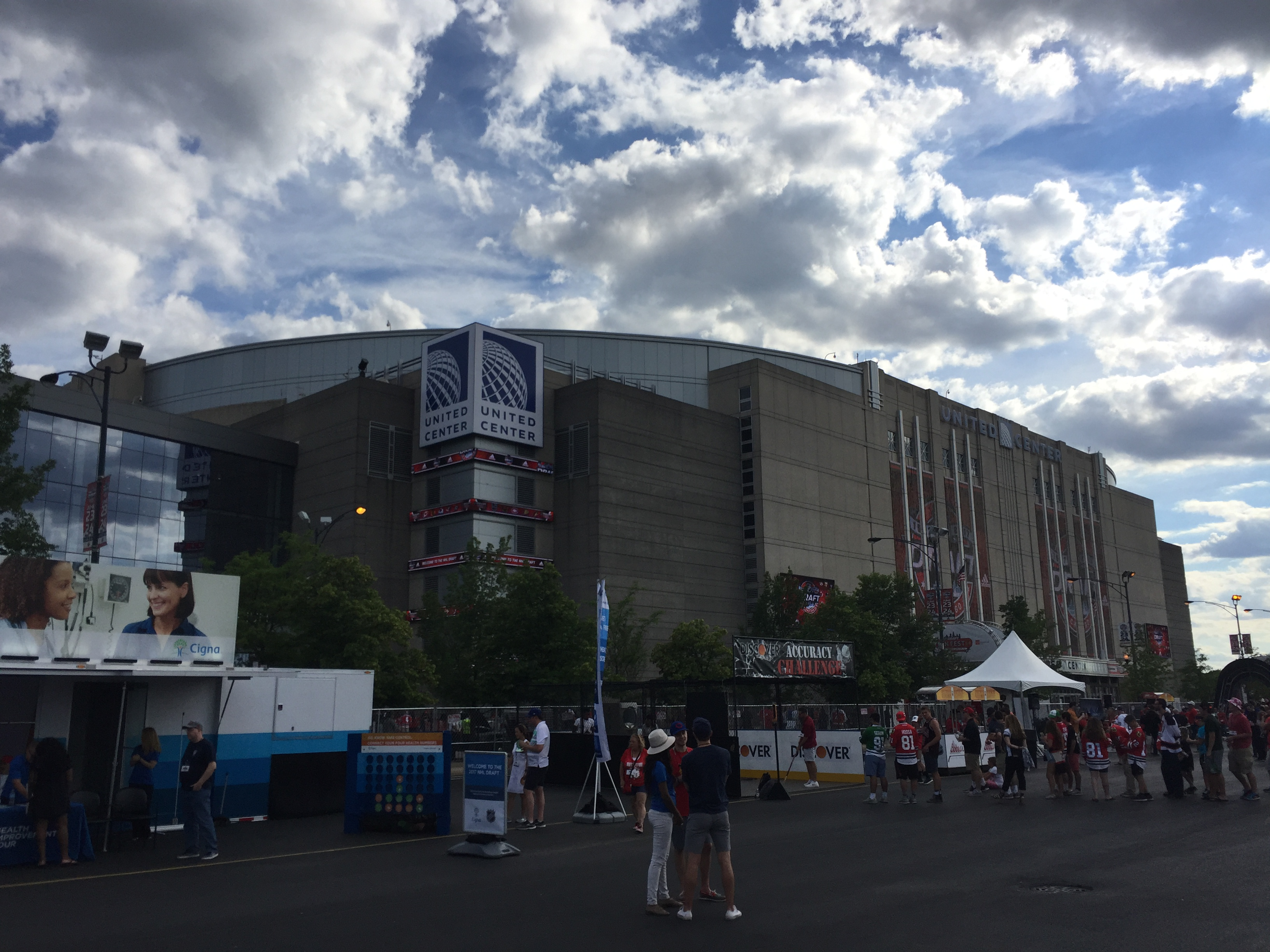
Exterior of the United Center during the draft

The 2017 NHL entry draft was the 55th draft for the National Hockey League. It was held on June 23–24, 2017, at the United Center in Chicago. The first three selections were Nico Hischier by the New Jersey Devils, Nolan Patrick by the Philadelphia Flyers, and Miro Heiskanen by the Dallas Stars.

As of 2026, there are 55 active NHL players from this draft.

== Eligibility ==
Ice hockey players born between January 1, 1997, and September 15, 1999, were eligible for selection in the 2017 NHL entry draft. Additionally, undrafted non-North American players born in 1996 were eligible for the draft; and those players who were drafted in the 2015 NHL entry draft, but not signed by an NHL team and who were born after June 30, 1997, were also eligible to re-enter the draft.

== Draft lottery ==
Since the 2012–13 NHL season all teams not qualifying for the Stanley Cup playoffs have a "weighted" chance at winning the first overall selection. Beginning with the 2014–15 NHL season the NHL changed the weighting system that was used in previous years. Under the new system the odds of winning the draft lottery for the four lowest finishing teams in the league decreased, while the odds for the other non-playoff teams increased. The first three picks overall in this draft were awarded by lottery. The odds of winning the second and third draws increased on a proportional basis depending on which team won the previous draw. In the 2017 draft lottery, the expansion Vegas Golden Knights had the same odds of winning the lottery as the team that finished with the third fewest points in the 2016–17 NHL season (this ended up being the Arizona Coyotes). Vegas earned the lowest possible pick that they could receive, and selected sixth overall in the first-round and third in each subsequent round of this draft. The New Jersey Devils, Philadelphia Flyers and Dallas Stars won the draft lotteries that took place on April 29, 2017, giving them the first, second and third picks overall. New Jersey moved up four spots to earn the first selection, while Philadelphia and Dallas moved up from the thirteenth and eighth spots, respectively. In the process, the Colorado Avalanche, Vancouver Canucks, Vegas Golden Knights and Arizona Coyotes were each knocked down three places from first, second, third and fourth overall, respectively, while the Buffalo Sabres and Detroit Red Wings dropped two spots and the Florida Panthers, Los Angeles Kings, Carolina Hurricanes and Winnipeg Jets each dropped one place.

Indicates team won first overall
Indicates team won second overall
Indicates team won third overall
Indicates teams that did not win a lottery

Complete draft position odds
Team	1st	2nd	3rd	4th	5th	6th	7th	8th	9th	10th	11th	12th	13th	14th	15th
Colorado	18.0%	16.0%	14.1%	52.0%											
Vancouver	12.1%	11.8%	11.3%	34.0%	30.7%										
Vegas	10.3%	10.3%	10.1%	11.8%	39.3%	18.1%									
Arizona	10.3%	10.3%	10.1%	2.1%	22.8%	34.6%	9.7%								
New Jersey	8.5%	8.7%	8.8%		7.2%	33.0%	28.7%	5.2%							
Buffalo	7.6%	7.8%	8.0%			14.3%	38.2%	21.4%	2.6%						
Detroit	6.7%	7.0%	7.2%				23.4%	39.7%	14.8%	1.2%					
Dallas	5.8%	6.1%	6.4%					33.7%	37.9%	9.5%	0.5%				
Florida	5.4%	5.7%	6.0%						44.7%	32.7%	5.4%	0.2%			
Los Angeles	4.5%	4.8%	5.1%							56.5%	26.4%	2.7%	0.1%		
Carolina	3.2%	3.4%	3.7%								67.8%	20.7%	1.3%	<0.1%	
Winnipeg	2.7%	2.9%	3.2%									76.4%	14.3%	0.5%	<0.1%
Philadelphia	2.2%	2.4%	2.7%										84.3%	8.3%	0.1%
Tampa Bay	1.8%	2.0%	2.2%											91.2%	2.9%
NY Islanders	0.9%	1.0%	1.1%												97.0%

== Top prospects ==
Source: NHL Central Scouting final (April 11, 2017) ranking.

Ranking	North American skaters	European skaters
1	(Canada) Nolan Patrick (C)	(Russia) Klim Kostin (C/LW)
2	(Switzerland) Nico Hischier (C)	(Sweden) Elias Pettersson (C)
3	(United States) Casey Mittelstadt (C)	(Sweden) Lias Andersson (C)
4	(Canada) Gabriel Vilardi (C)	(Finland) Miro Heiskanen (D)
5	(Canada) Michael Rasmussen (C)	(Czech Republic) Martin Necas (C)
6	(Canada) Cody Glass (C)	(Sweden) Timothy Liljegren (D)
7	(Canada) Owen Tippett (RW)	(Finland) Kristian Vesalainen (LW/RW)
8	(Finland) Eeli Tolvanen (RW)	(Finland) Urho Vaakanainen (D)
9	(Canada) Cale Makar (D)	(Sweden) Erik Brannstrom (D)
10	(Canada) Nick Suzuki (C)	(Sweden) Jesper Boqvist (C)

Ranking	North American goalies	European goalies
1	(United States) Jake Oettinger	(Finland) Ukko-Pekka Luukkonen
2	(United States) Keith Petruzzelli	(Sweden) Olle Eriksson Ek
3	(Canada) Ian Scott	(Sweden) Adam Ahman

== Selections by round ==
The order of the 2017 entry draft is listed below.

= NHL All-Star team ·	= NHL All-Star (Note: Players are identified as an All-Star if they were selected for the All-Star game at any time in their career.) ·	= NHL All-Star and NHL All-Star team ·

=== Round one ===
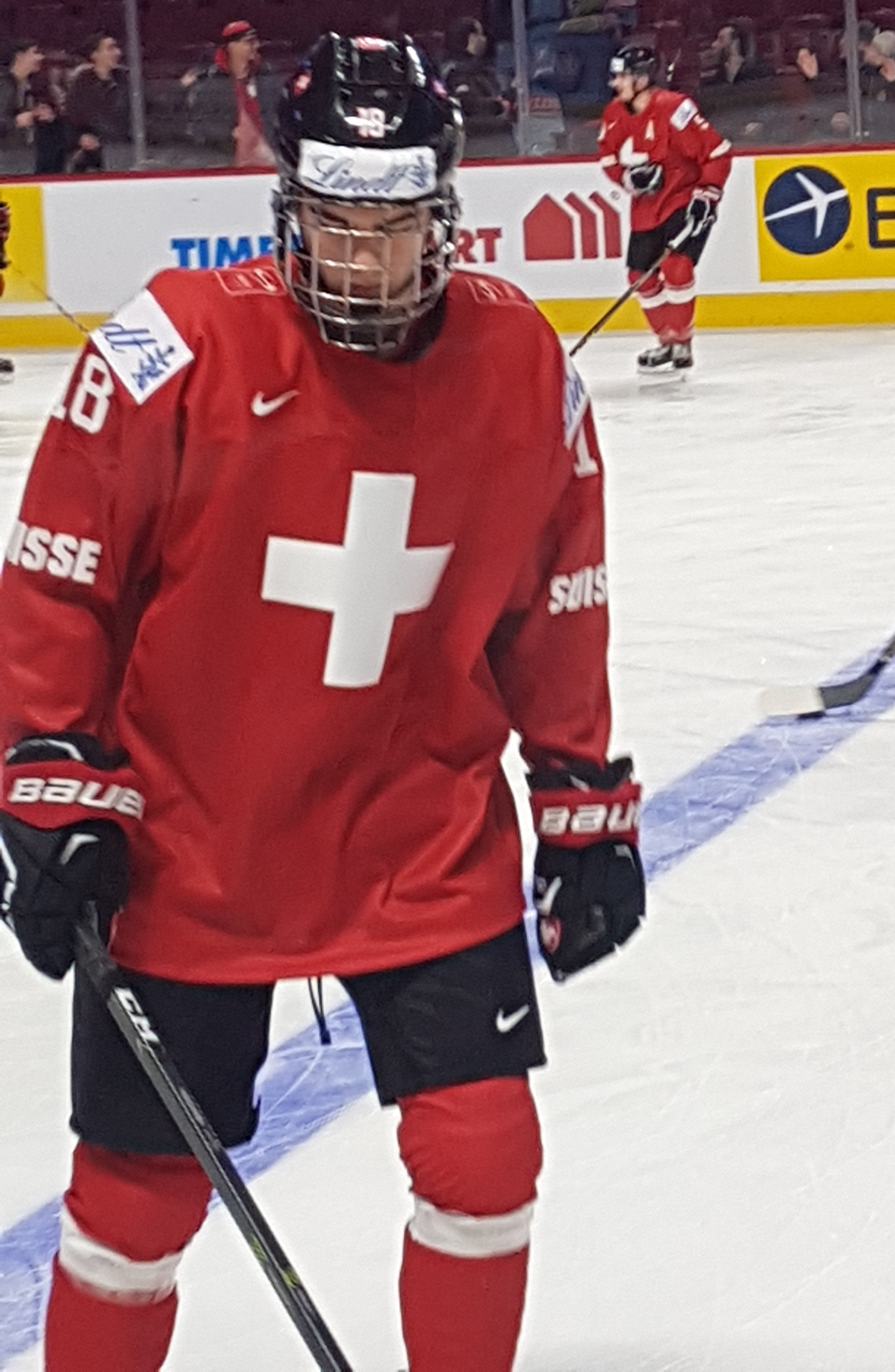
Nico Hischier was selected first overall by the New Jersey Devils.

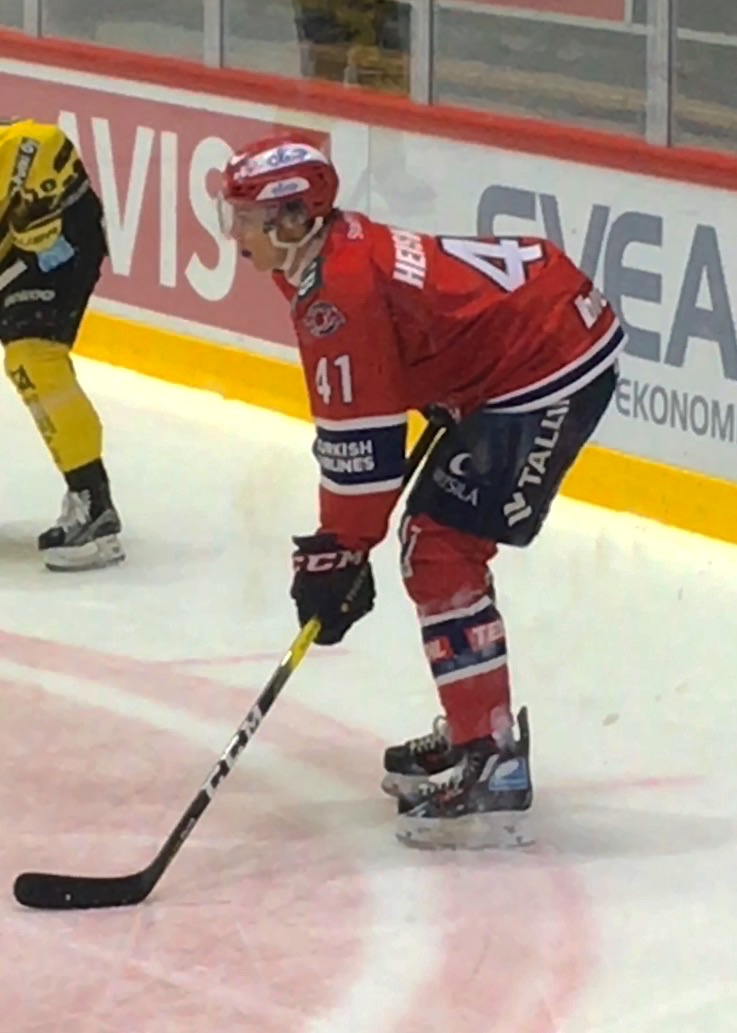
Miro Heiskanen was selected third overall by the Dallas Stars.

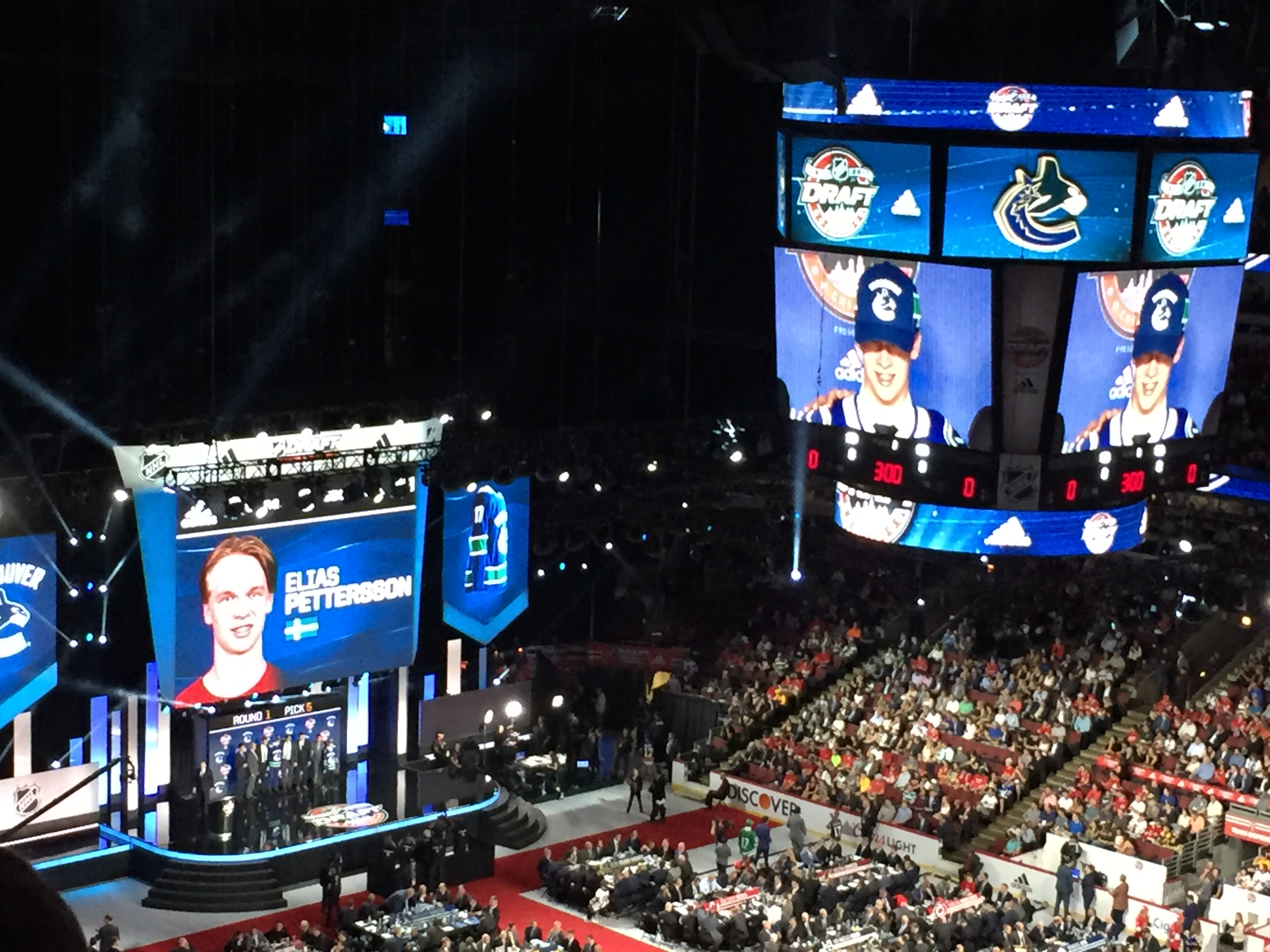
Elias Pettersson was selected fifth overall by the Vancouver Canucks.

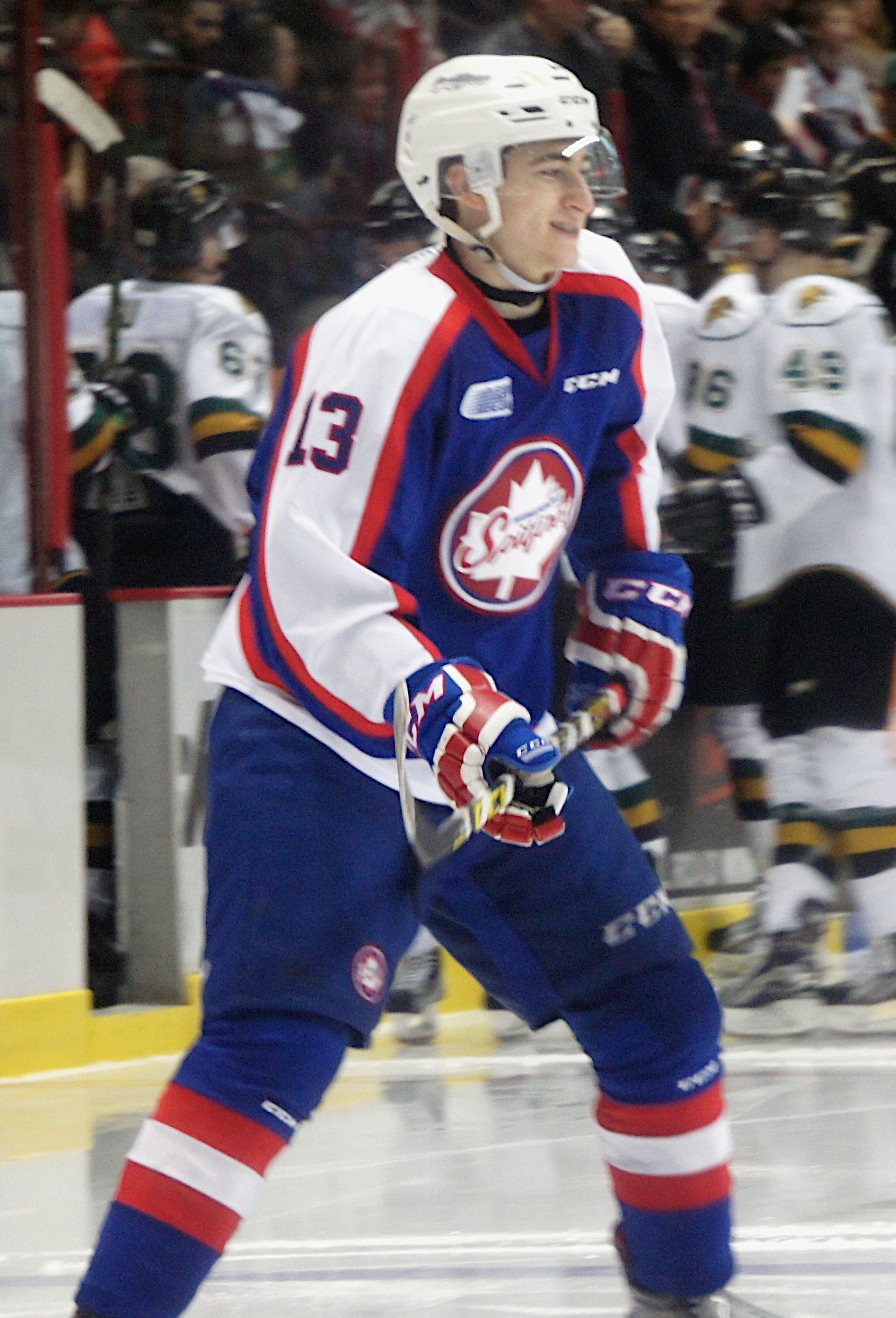
Gabriel Vilardi was selected eleventh overall by the Los Angeles Kings.

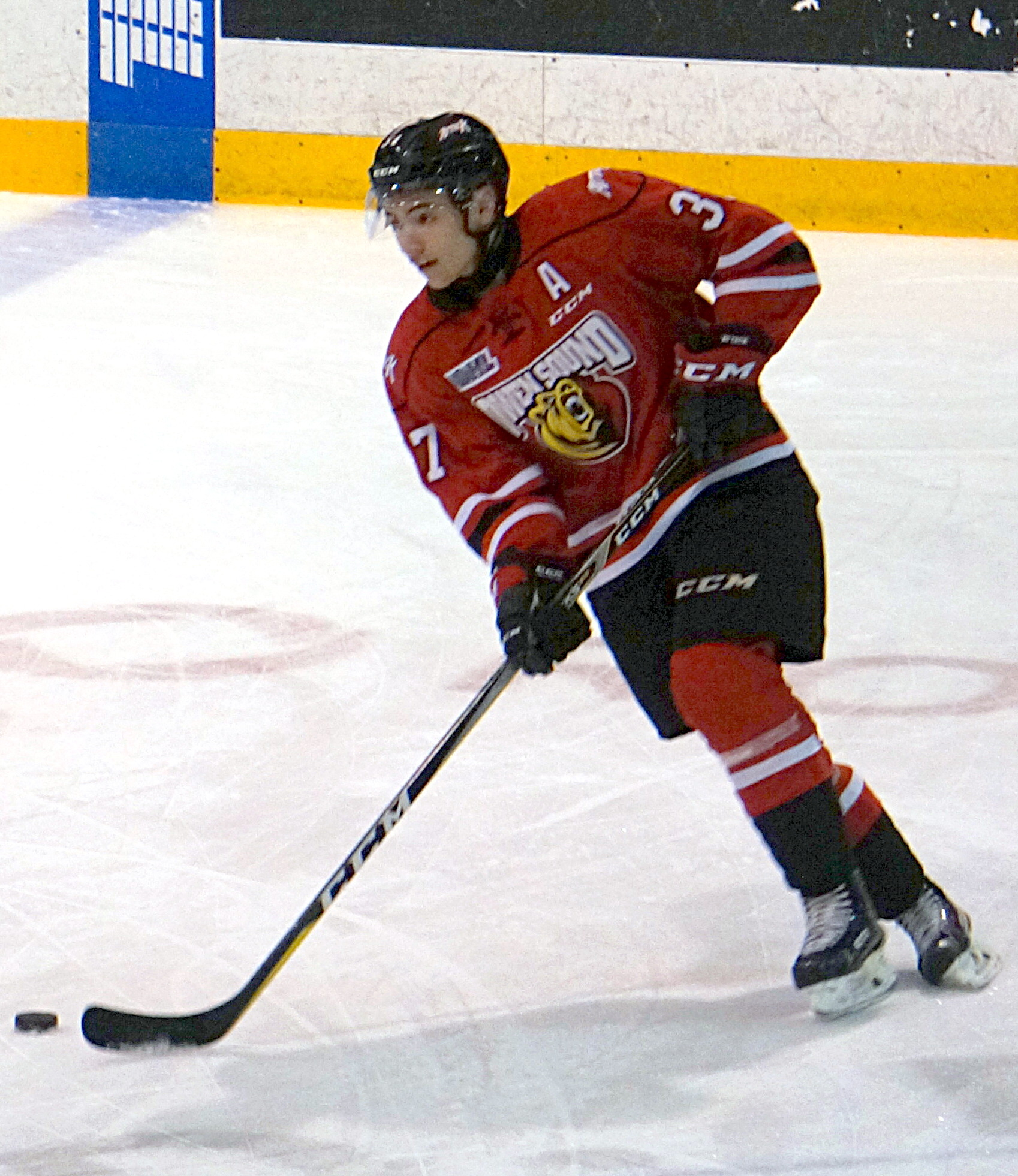
Nick Suzuki was selected thirteenth overall by the Vegas Golden Knights.

#	Player	Nationality	NHL team	College/junior/club team
1	Nico Hischier (C)	Switzerland	New Jersey Devils	Halifax Mooseheads (QMJHL)
2	Nolan Patrick (C)	Canada	Philadelphia Flyers	Brandon Wheat Kings (WHL)
3	Miro Heiskanen (D)	Finland	Dallas Stars	HIFK (Liiga)
4	Cale Makar (D)	Canada	Colorado Avalanche	Brooks Bandits (AJHL)
5	Elias Pettersson (C)	Sweden	Vancouver Canucks	Timra IK (HockeyAllsvenskan)
6	Cody Glass (C)	Canada	Vegas Golden Knights	Portland Winterhawks (WHL)
7	Lias Andersson (C)	Sweden	New York Rangers (from Arizona)^{1}	HV71 (SHL)
8	Casey Mittelstadt (C)	United States	Buffalo Sabres	Green Bay Gamblers (USHL)
9	Michael Rasmussen (C)	Canada	Detroit Red Wings	Tri-City Americans (WHL)
10	Owen Tippett (RW)	Canada	Florida Panthers	Mississauga Steelheads (OHL)
11	Gabriel Vilardi (C)	Canada	Los Angeles Kings	Windsor Spitfires (OHL)
12	Martin Necas (C)	Czech Republic	Carolina Hurricanes	HC Kometa Brno (Czech Extraliga)
13	Nick Suzuki (C)	Canada	Vegas Golden Knights (from Winnipeg)^{2}	Owen Sound Attack (OHL)
14	Callan Foote (D)	Canada	Tampa Bay Lightning	Kelowna Rockets (WHL)
15	Erik Brannstrom (D)	Sweden	Vegas Golden Knights (from NY Islanders)^{3}	HV71 (SHL)
16	Juuso Valimaki (D)	Finland	Calgary Flames	Tri-City Americans (WHL)
17	Timothy Liljegren (D)	Sweden	Toronto Maple Leafs	Rogle BK (SHL)
18	Urho Vaakanainen (D)	Finland	Boston Bruins	JYP (Liiga)
19	Josh Norris (C)	United States	San Jose Sharks	U.S. NTDP (USHL)
20	Robert Thomas (C)	Canada	St. Louis Blues	London Knights (OHL)
21	Filip Chytil (C)	Czech Republic	New York Rangers	PSG Zlin (Czech Extraliga)
22	Kailer Yamamoto (RW)	United States	Edmonton Oilers	Spokane Chiefs (WHL)
23	Pierre-Olivier Joseph (D)	Canada	Arizona Coyotes (from Minnesota)^{4}	Charlottetown Islanders (QMJHL)
24	Kristian Vesalainen (RW)	Finland	Winnipeg Jets (from Columbus via Vegas)^{5}	Frolunda HC (SHL)
25	Ryan Poehling (C)	United States	Montreal Canadiens	St. Cloud State (NCHC)
26	Jake Oettinger (G)	United States	Dallas Stars (from Chicago)^{6}	Boston University (HE)
27	Morgan Frost (C)	Canada	Philadelphia Flyers (from Washington via St. Louis)^{7}	Sault Ste. Marie Greyhounds (OHL)
28	Shane Bowers (C)	Canada	Ottawa Senators	Waterloo Black Hawks (USHL)
29	Henri Jokiharju (D)	Finland	Chicago Blackhawks (from Anaheim via Dallas)^{8}	Portland Winterhawks (WHL)
30	Eeli Tolvanen (RW)	Finland	Nashville Predators	Sioux City Musketeers (USHL)
31	Klim Kostin (C/LW)	Russia	St. Louis Blues (from Pittsburgh)^{9}	Dynamo Moscow (KHL)

Notes

1. The Arizona Coyotes' first-round pick went to the New York Rangers as the result of a trade on June 23, 2017, that sent Derek Stepan and Antti Raanta to Arizona in exchange for Tony DeAngelo and this pick.
2. The Winnipeg Jets' first-round pick went to the Vegas Golden Knights as the result of a trade on June 21, 2017, that sent Columbus' first-round pick in 2017 to Winnipeg in exchange for Vegas selecting Chris Thorburn in the 2017 NHL expansion draft from Winnipeg, a third-round pick in 2019 and this pick.
3. The New York Islanders' first-round pick went to the Vegas Golden Knights as the result of a trade on June 21, 2017, that ensured that Vegas selected Jean-Francois Berube in the 2017 NHL expansion draft from the Islanders in exchange for Mikhail Grabovski, Jake Bischoff, a second-round pick in 2019 and this pick.
4. The Minnesota Wild's first-round pick went to the Arizona Coyotes as the result of a trade on February 26, 2017, that sent Martin Hanzal, Ryan White and a fourth-round pick in 2017 to Minnesota in exchange for Grayson Downing, a second-round pick in 2018, a conditional fourth-round pick in 2019 and this pick.
5. The Columbus Blue Jackets' first-round pick went to the Winnipeg Jets as the result of a trade on June 21, 2017, that sent a first-round pick in 2017, a third-round pick in 2019 to Vegas and ensured that Vegas selected Chris Thorburn in the 2017 NHL expansion draft from Winnipeg in exchange for this pick.
  Vegas previously acquired this pick as the result of a trade on June 21, 2017, that ensured that Vegas selected William Karlsson in the 2017 NHL expansion draft from Columbus in exchange for David Clarkson, a second-round pick in 2019 and this pick.
6. The Chicago Blackhawks' first-round pick went to the Dallas Stars as the result of a trade on June 23, 2017, that sent Anaheim's first-round pick in 2017 (29th overall) and a third-round pick in 2017 (70th overall) to Chicago in exchange for this pick.
7. The Washington Capitals' first-round pick went to the Philadelphia Flyers as the result of a trade on June 23, 2017, that sent Brayden Schenn to St. Louis in exchange for Jori Lehtera, a conditional first-round pick in 2018 and this pick.
  St. Louis previously acquired this pick as the result of a trade on February 27, 2017, that sent Kevin Shattenkirk and Pheonix Copley to Washington in exchange for Zach Sanford, Brad Malone, a conditional seventh-round pick in 2017 or 2018, a conditional second-round pick in 2019 and this pick.
8. The Anaheim Ducks' first-round pick went to the Chicago Blackhawks as the result of a trade on June 23, 2017, that sent a first-round pick in 2017 (26th overall) to Dallas in exchange for a third-round pick in 2017 (70th overall) and this pick.
  Dallas previously acquired this pick as the result of a trade on February 24, 2017, that sent Patrick Eaves to Anaheim in exchange for this pick (being conditional at the time of the trade). The condition – Dallas will receive a first-round pick in 2017 if Anaheim advances to the 2017 Western Conference Final and Eaves plays in at least 50% of their games – was converted on May 10, 2017.
9. The Pittsburgh Penguins' first-round pick went to the St. Louis Blues as the result of a trade on June 23, 2017, that sent Ryan Reaves and a second-round pick in 2017 (51st overall) to Pittsburgh in exchange for Oskar Sundqvist and this pick.

=== Round two ===
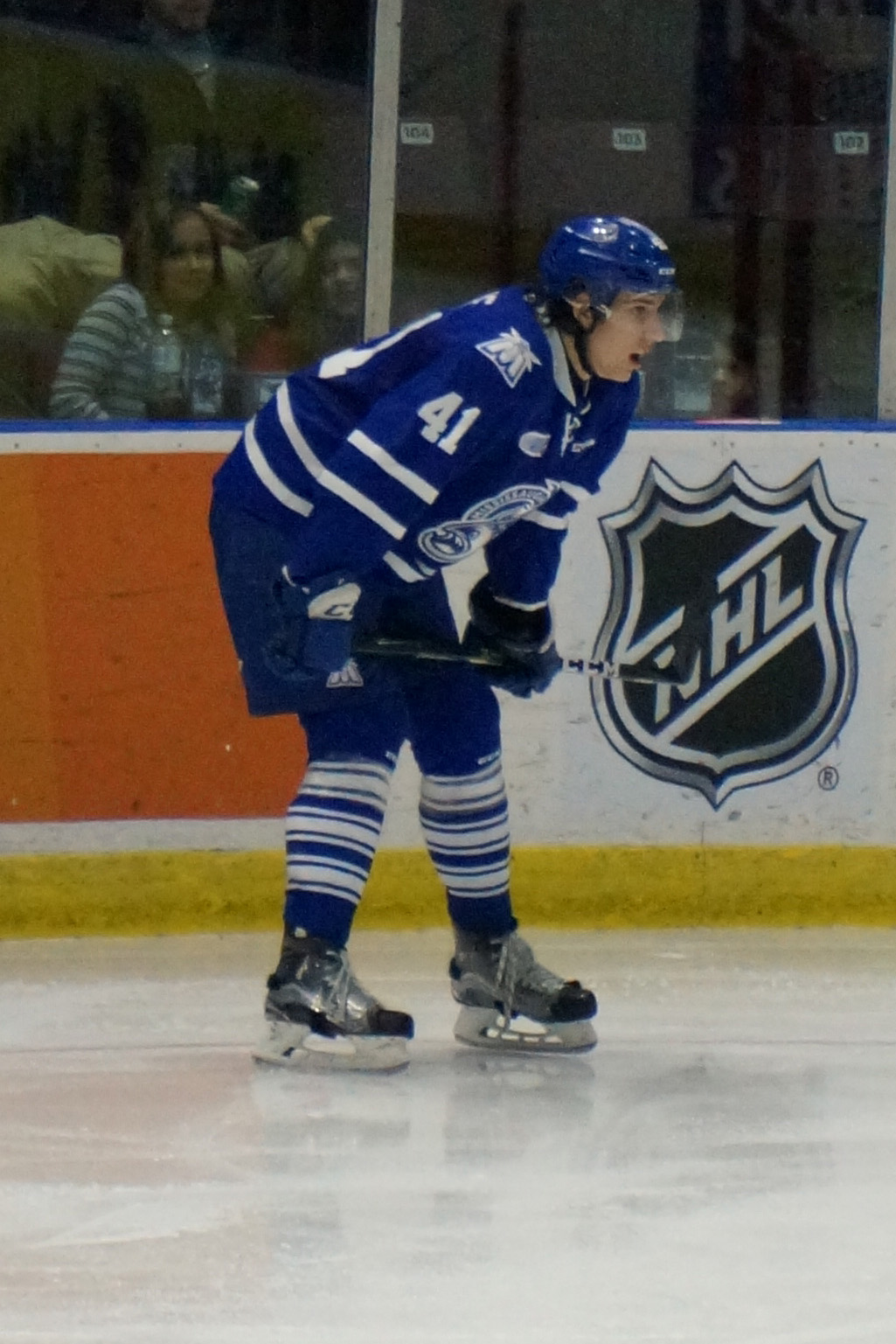
Nicolas Hague was selected 34th overall by the Vegas Golden Knights.

#	Player	Nationality	NHL team	College/junior/club team
32	Conor Timmins (D)	Canada	Colorado Avalanche	Sault Ste. Marie Greyhounds (OHL)
33	Kole Lind (RW)	Canada	Vancouver Canucks	Kelowna Rockets (WHL)
34	Nicolas Hague (D)	Canada	Vegas Golden Knights	Mississauga Steelheads (OHL)
35	Isaac Ratcliffe (C)	Canada	Philadelphia Flyers (from Arizona)^{1}	Guelph Storm (OHL)
36	Jesper Boqvist (RW)	Sweden	New Jersey Devils	Brynas IF (SHL)
37	Marcus Davidsson (RW)	Sweden	Buffalo Sabres	Djurgardens IF Hockey (SHL)
38	Gustav Lindstrom (D)	Sweden	Detroit Red Wings	Almtuna IS (HockeyAllsvenskan)
39	Jason Robertson (RW)	United States	Dallas Stars	Kingston Frontenacs (OHL)
40	Aleksi Heponiemi (C)	Finland	Florida Panthers	Swift Current Broncos (WHL)
41	Jaret Anderson-Dolan (C)	Canada	Los Angeles Kings	Spokane Chiefs (WHL)
42	Eetu Luostarinen (C)	Finland	Carolina Hurricanes	KalPa (Liiga)
43	Dylan Samberg (D)	United States	Winnipeg Jets	Hermantown High (USHS)
44	Filip Westerlund (D)	Sweden	Arizona Coyotes (from Philadelphia)^{2}	Frolunda HC (SHL)
45	Alexandre Texier (C)	France	Columbus Blue Jackets (from Tampa Bay via Vegas)^{3}	Brûleurs de Loups (Ligue Magnus)
46	Robin Salo (D)	Finland	New York Islanders	Vaasan Sport (Liiga)
47	Alex Formenton (LW)	Canada	Ottawa Senators (from Calgary)^{4}	London Knights (OHL)
48	Alexander Volkov (RW)	Russia	Tampa Bay Lightning (from Toronto)^{5}	SKA-1946 St. Petersburg (MHL)
49	Mario Ferraro (D)	Canada	San Jose Sharks (from Boston via New Jersey)^{6}	Des Moines Buccaneers (USHL)
50	Maxime Comtois (LW)	Canada	Anaheim Ducks (from San Jose via Toronto)^{7}	Victoriaville Tigres (QMJHL)
51	Zachary Lauzon (D)	Canada	Pittsburgh Penguins (from St. Louis)^{8}	Rouyn-Noranda Huskies (QMJHL)
52	Luke Martin (D)	United States	Carolina Hurricanes (from NY Rangers)^{9}	University of Michigan (B1G)
53	Jack Studnicka (C)	Canada	Boston Bruins (from Edmonton)^{10}	Oshawa Generals (OHL)
54	Ukko-Pekka Luukkonen (G)	Finland	Buffalo Sabres (from Minnesota)^{11}	HPK U20 (Jr. A SM-liiga)
55	Jonah Gadjovich (LW)	Canada	Vancouver Canucks (from Columbus)^{12}	Owen Sound Attack (OHL)
56	Josh Brook (D)	Canada	Montreal Canadiens	Moose Jaw Warriors (WHL)
57	Ian Mitchell (D)	Canada	Chicago Blackhawks	Spruce Grove Saints (AJHL)
58	Joni Ikonen (C)	Finland	Montreal Canadiens (from Washington)^{13}	Frolunda HC (SHL)
59	Eemeli Rasanen (D)	Finland	Toronto Maple Leafs (from Ottawa)^{14}	Kingston Frontenacs (OHL)
60	Antoine Morand (C)	Canada	Anaheim Ducks	Acadie–Bathurst Titan (QMJHL)
61	Grant Mismash (C)	United States	Nashville Predators	U.S. NTDP (USHL)
62	Jake Leschyshyn (C)	Canada	Vegas Golden Knights (from Pittsburgh via Carolina)^{15}	Regina Pats (WHL)

Notes

1. The Arizona Coyotes' second-round pick went to the Philadelphia Flyers as the result of a trade on June 24, 2017, that sent a second and third-round pick both in 2017 (44th and 75th overall) and the Islanders' fourth-round pick in 2017 (108th overall) to Arizona in exchange for this pick.
2. The Philadelphia Flyers' second-round pick went to the Arizona Coyotes as the result of a trade on June 24, 2017, that sent a second-round pick in 2017 (35th overall) to Philadelphia in exchange for a third-round pick in 2017 (75th overall), the Islanders' fourth-round pick in 2017 (108th overall) and this pick.
3. The Tampa Bay Lightning's second-round pick went to the Columbus Blue Jackets as the result of a trade on June 24, 2017, that sent Keegan Kolesar to Vegas in exchange for this pick.
  Vegas previously acquired this pick as the result of a trade on June 21, 2017, that ensured that Vegas selected Jason Garrison in the 2017 NHL expansion draft from Tampa Bay in exchange for Nikita Gusev, Pittsburgh's fourth-round pick in 2018 and this pick.
4. The Calgary Flames' second-round pick went to the Ottawa Senators as the result of a trade on March 1, 2017, that sent Curtis Lazar and Mike Kostka to Calgary in exchange for Jyrki Jokipakka and this pick.
5. The Toronto Maple Leafs' second-round pick went to the Tampa Bay Lightning as the result of a trade on February 27, 2017, that sent Brian Boyle to Toronto in exchange for Byron Froese and this pick (being conditional at the time of the trade). The condition – Tampa Bay will receive the highest pick of Ottawa, San Jose or Toronto's second-round picks in 2017 – was converted on April 23, 2017, when Toronto was eliminated from the 2017 Stanley Cup playoffs, ensuring that Toronto's second-round pick would be higher than San Jose or Ottawa's second-round picks.
6. The Boston Bruins' second-round pick went to the San Jose Sharks as the result of a trade on June 17, 2017, that sent Mirco Mueller and a fifth-round pick in 2017 to New Jersey in exchange for Nashville's fourth-round pick in 2017 and this pick.
  New Jersey previously acquired this pick as the result of a trade on February 29, 2016, that sent Lee Stempniak to Boston in exchange for a fourth-round pick in 2016 and this pick.
7. The San Jose Sharks' second-round pick went to the Anaheim Ducks as the result of a trade on June 20, 2016, that sent Frederik Andersen to Toronto in exchange for Pittsburgh's first-round pick in 2016 and this pick (being conditional at the time of the trade). The condition – Anaheim will receive the middle pick of Ottawa, San Jose or Toronto's second-round picks in 2017. – was converted on May 9, 2017, when Ottawa advanced to the 2017 Eastern Conference Final, ensuring that the Sharks second-round pick would be higher than the Senators' and lower than the Maple Leafs'.
  Toronto previously acquired this pick as the result of a trade on February 22, 2016, that sent Roman Polak and Nick Spaling to San Jose in exchange for Raffi Torres, a second-round pick in 2018 and this pick.
8. The St. Louis Blues' second-round pick went to the Pittsburgh Penguins as the result of a trade on June 23, 2017, that sent Oskar Sundqvist and a first-round pick in 2017 (31st overall) to St. Louis in exchange for Ryan Reaves and this pick.
9. The New York Rangers' second-round pick went to the Carolina Hurricanes as the result of a trade on February 28, 2016, that sent Eric Staal to New York in exchange for Aleksi Saarela, a second-round pick in 2016 and this pick.
10. The Edmonton Oilers' second-round pick went to the Boston Bruins as compensation for Edmonton hiring Peter Chiarelli as their president and general manager on April 25, 2015.
11. The Minnesota Wild's second-round pick went the Buffalo Sabres as the result of a trade on March 2, 2015, that sent Chris Stewart to Minnesota in exchange for this pick.
12. The Columbus Blue Jackets' second-round pick went to the Vancouver Canucks as compensation for Columbus hiring John Tortorella as their head coach on October 21, 2015.
13. The Washington Capitals' second-round pick went to the Montreal Canadiens as the result of a trade on June 24, 2016, that sent Lars Eller to Washington in exchange for a second-round pick in 2018 and this pick.
14. The Ottawa Senators' second-round pick went the Toronto Maple Leafs as the result of a trade on February 9, 2016, that sent Dion Phaneuf, Matt Frattin, Casey Bailey, Ryan Rupert and Cody Donaghey to Ottawa in exchange for Milan Michalek, Jared Cowen, Colin Greening, Tobias Lindberg and this pick.
15. The Pittsburgh Penguins' second-round pick went to the Vegas Golden Knights as the result of a trade on June 22, 2017, that sent Trevor van Riemsdyk and a seventh-round pick in 2018 to Carolina in exchange for this pick.
  Carolina previously acquired this pick as the result of a trade on February 23, 2017, that sent Ron Hainsey to Pittsburgh in exchange for Danny Kristo and this pick.

=== Round three ===
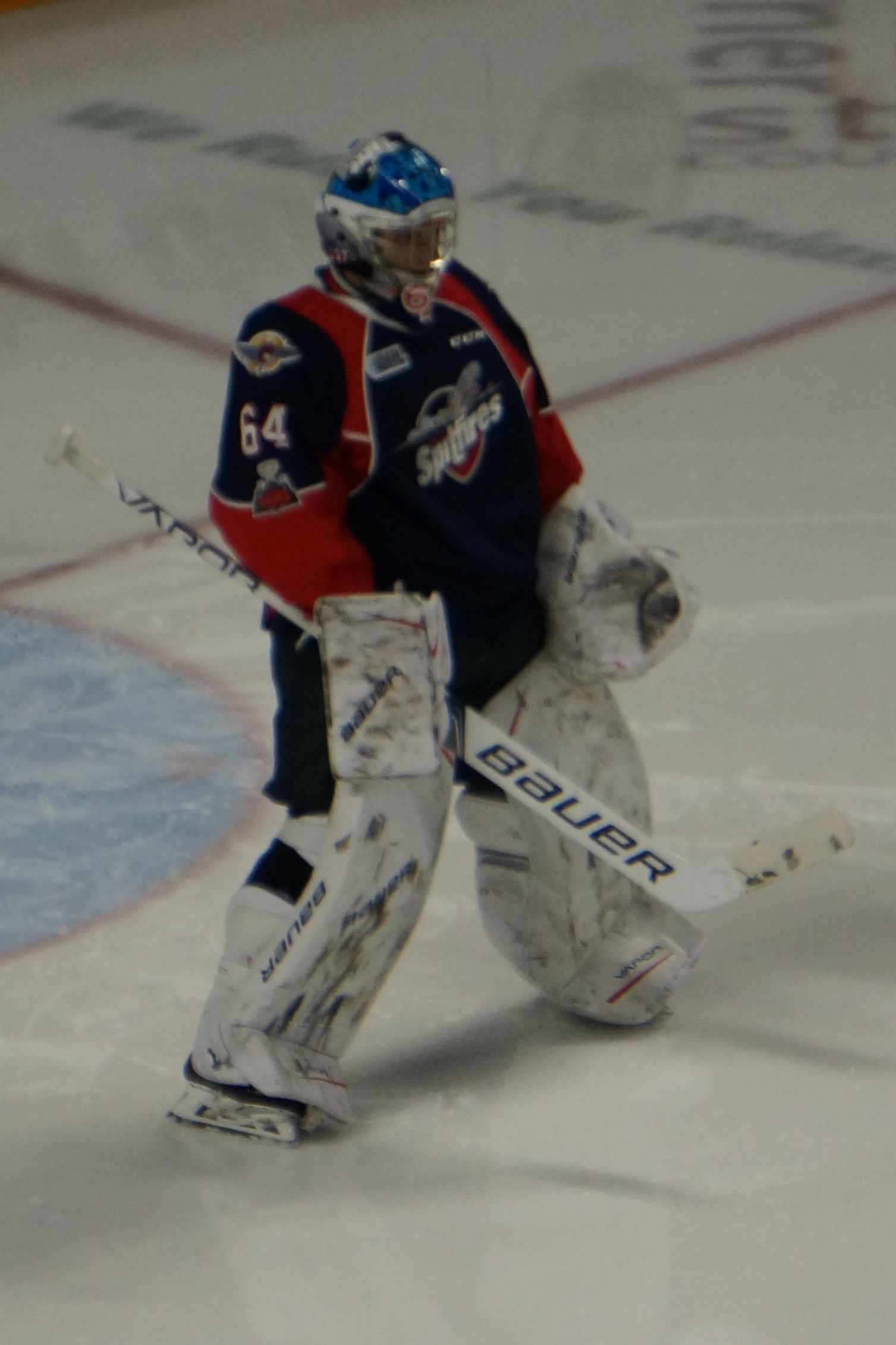
Michael DiPietro was selected 64th overall by the Vancouver Canucks.

#	Player	Nationality	NHL team	College/junior/club team
63	Fabian Zetterlund (LW)	Sweden	New Jersey Devils (from Colorado)^{1}	Farjestad BK J20 (SuperElit)
64	Michael DiPietro (G)	Canada	Vancouver Canucks	Windsor Spitfires (OHL)
65	Jonas Rondbjerg (RW)	Denmark	Vegas Golden Knights	Vaxjo Lakers J20 (SuperElit)
66	Max Gildon (D)	United States	Florida Panthers (from Arizona)^{2}	U.S. NTDP (USHL)
67	Morgan Geekie (C)	Canada	Carolina Hurricanes (from New Jersey)^{3}	Tri-City Americans (WHL)
68	Scott Walford (D)	Canada	Montreal Canadiens (from Buffalo)^{4}	Victoria Royals (WHL)
69	MacKenzie Entwistle (RW)	Canada	Arizona Coyotes (from Detroit via San Jose)^{5}	Hamilton Bulldogs (OHL)
70	Andrei Altybarmakyan (RW)	Russia	Chicago Blackhawks (from Dallas)^{6}	Lvy-St. Petersburg (MHL)
71	Kasper Kotkansalo (D)	Finland	Detroit Red Wings (from Florida)^{7}	Sioux Falls Stampede (USHL)
72	Matt Villalta (G)	Canada	Los Angeles Kings	Sault Ste. Marie Greyhounds (OHL)
73	Stelio Mattheos (RW)	Canada	Carolina Hurricanes	Brandon Wheat Kings (WHL)
74	Johnathan Kovacevic (D)	Canada	Winnipeg Jets	Merrimack College (HE)
75	Nate Schnarr (C)	Canada	Arizona Coyotes (from Philadelphia)^{8}	Guelph Storm (OHL)
76	Alexei Lipanov (C)	Russia	Tampa Bay Lightning	Dynamo Balashikha (VHL)
77	Benjamin Mirageas (D)	United States	New York Islanders	Chicago Steel (USHL)
78	Stuart Skinner (G)	Canada	Edmonton Oilers (from Calgary via Arizona)^{9}	Lethbridge Hurricanes (WHL)
79	Lane Zablocki (RW)	Canada	Detroit Red Wings (from Toronto)^{10}	Red Deer Rebels (WHL)
80	Kirill Ustimenko (G)	Russia	Philadelphia Flyers (from Boston)^{11}	HC Dinamo Saint Petersburg (MHL)
81	Reilly Walsh (D)	United States	New Jersey Devils (from San Jose)^{12}	Chicago Steel (USHL)
82	Cameron Crotty (D)	Canada	Arizona Coyotes (from St. Louis via Edmonton)^{13}	Brockville Braves (CCHL)
83	Zachary Gallant (C)	Canada	Detroit Red Wings (from NY Rangers)^{14}	Peterborough Petes (OHL)
84	Dmitri Samorukov (D)	Russia	Edmonton Oilers	Guelph Storm (OHL)
85	Ivan Lodnia (RW)	United States	Minnesota Wild	Erie Otters (OHL)
86	Daniil Tarasov (G)	Russia	Columbus Blue Jackets	Tolpar Ufa (MHL)
87	Cale Fleury (D)	Canada	Montreal Canadiens	Kootenay Ice (WHL)
88	Keith Petruzzelli (G)	United States	Detroit Red Wings (from Chicago via Carolina and Chicago)^{15}	Muskegon Lumberjacks (USHL)
89	Oskari Laaksonen (D)	Finland	Buffalo Sabres (from Washington)^{16}	Ilves U20 (Jr. A SM-liiga)
90	Evan Barratt (C)	United States	Chicago Blackhawks (from Ottawa via Carolina)^{17}	U.S. NTDP (USHL)
91	Jack Badini (LW)	United States	Anaheim Ducks	Chicago Steel (USHL)
92	David Farrance (D)	United States	Nashville Predators	U.S. NTDP (USHL)
93	Clayton Phillips (D)	United States	Pittsburgh Penguins	Fargo Force (USHL)

Notes

1. The Colorado Avalanche's third-round pick went the New Jersey Devils as the result of a trade on February 29, 2016, that sent Eric Gelinas to Colorado in exchange for this pick.
2. The Arizona Coyotes' third-round pick went to the Florida Panthers as the result of a trade on August 25, 2016, that sent Dave Bolland and Lawson Crouse to Arizona in exchange for a conditional second-round pick in 2018 and this pick (being conditional at the time of the trade). The condition – Florida will receive the better of Arizona or Detroit's third-round picks in 2017 – was converted on March 29, 2017, when Detroit clinched a better regular season record than Arizona for the 2016–17 NHL season.
3. The New Jersey Devils' third-round pick went to the Carolina Hurricanes as the result of a trade on March 5, 2014, that sent Tuomo Ruutu to New Jersey in exchange for Andrei Loktionov and this pick (being conditional at the time of the trade). The condition and date of conversion are unknown.
4. The Buffalo Sabres' third-round pick went to the Montreal Canadiens as the result of a trade on June 17, 2017, that sent Nathan Beaulieu to Buffalo in exchange for this pick.
5. The Detroit Red Wings' third-round pick went to the Arizona Coyotes as the result of a trade on June 20, 2016, that sent Maxim Letunov and a sixth-round pick in 2017 to San Jose in exchange for a fourth-round pick in 2016 and this pick.
  San Jose previously acquired this pick as the result of a trade on May 26, 2016, that sent Dylan Sadowy to Detroit in exchange for this pick.
6. The Dallas Stars' third-round pick went to the Chicago Blackhawks as the result of a trade on June 23, 2017, that sent a first-round pick in 2017 (26th overall) to Dallas in exchange for Anaheim's first-round pick in 2017 (29th overall) and this pick.
7. The Florida Panthers' third-round pick went to the Detroit Red Wings as the result of a trade on March 1, 2017, that sent Thomas Vanek to Florida in exchange for Dylan McIlrath and this pick (being conditional at the time of the trade). The condition – Detroit will receive a third-round pick in 2017 if Florida fails to qualify for the 2017 Stanley Cup playoffs – was converted on March 30, 2017.
8. The Philadelphia Flyers' third-round pick went to the Arizona Coyotes as the result of a trade on June 24, 2017, that sent a second-round pick in 2017 (35th overall) to Philadelphia in exchange for a second-round pick in 2017 (44th overall), the Islanders' fourth-round pick in 2017 (108th overall) and this pick.
9. The Calgary Flames' third-round pick went to the Edmonton Oilers as the result of a trade on June 24, 2017, that sent St. Louis' third-round pick and Vancouver's fifth-round pick both in 2017 (82nd and 126th overall) to Arizona in exchange for this pick.
  Arizona previously acquired this pick as the result of a trade on February 20, 2017, that sent Michael Stone to Calgary in exchange for a conditional fifth-round pick in 2018 and this pick.
10. The Toronto Maple Leafs' third-round pick went to the Detroit Red Wings as compensation for Toronto hiring Mike Babcock as their head coach on May 20, 2015.
11. The Boston Bruins' third-round pick went the Philadelphia Flyers as the result of a trade on June 29, 2015, that sent Zac Rinaldo to Boston in exchange for this pick.
12. The San Jose Sharks' third-round pick went to the New Jersey Devils as compensation for San Jose signing Peter DeBoer as their head coach on May 28, 2015.
13. The St. Louis Blues' third-round pick went to the Arizona Coyotes as the result of a trade on June 24, 2017, that sent Calgary's third-round pick in 2017 (78th overall) to Edmonton in exchange for Vancouver's fifth-round pick in 2017 (126th overall) and this pick.
  Edmonton previously acquired this pick as the result of a trade on October 7, 2016, that sent Nail Yakupov to St. Louis in exchange for Zach Pochiro and this pick (being conditional at the time of the trade). The condition – Edmonton will receive a third-round pick in 2017 if Yakupov scores 14 or fewer goals in the 2016–17 season – was converted on April 9, 2017, when Yakupov finished the season with 3 goals.
14. The New York Rangers' third-round pick went to the Detroit Red Wings as the result of a trade on February 28, 2017, that sent Brendan Smith to New York in exchange for Ottawa's second-round pick in 2018 and this pick.
15. The Chicago Blackhawks' third-round pick went to the Detroit Red Wings as the result of a trade on February 24, 2017, that sent Tomas Jurco to Chicago in exchange for this pick.
  Chicago previously re-acquired this pick as the result of a trade on June 15, 2016, that sent Teuvo Teravainen and Bryan Bickell to Carolina in exchange for the Rangers' second-round pick in 2016 and this pick.
  Carolina previously acquired this pick as the result of a trade on September 11, 2015, that sent Dennis Robertson, Jake Massie and a fifth-round pick in 2017 to Chicago in exchange for Kris Versteeg, Joakim Nordstrom and this pick.
16. The Washington Capitals' third-round pick went to the Buffalo Sabres as the result of a trade on February 23, 2016, that sent Mike Weber to Washington in exchange for this pick.
17. The Ottawa Senators' third-round pick went to the Chicago Blackhawks as the result of a trade on April 28, 2017, that sent Scott Darling to Carolina in exchange for this pick.
  Carolina previously acquired this pick as the result of a trade on February 28, 2017, that sent Viktor Stalberg to Ottawa in exchange for this pick.

=== Round four ===
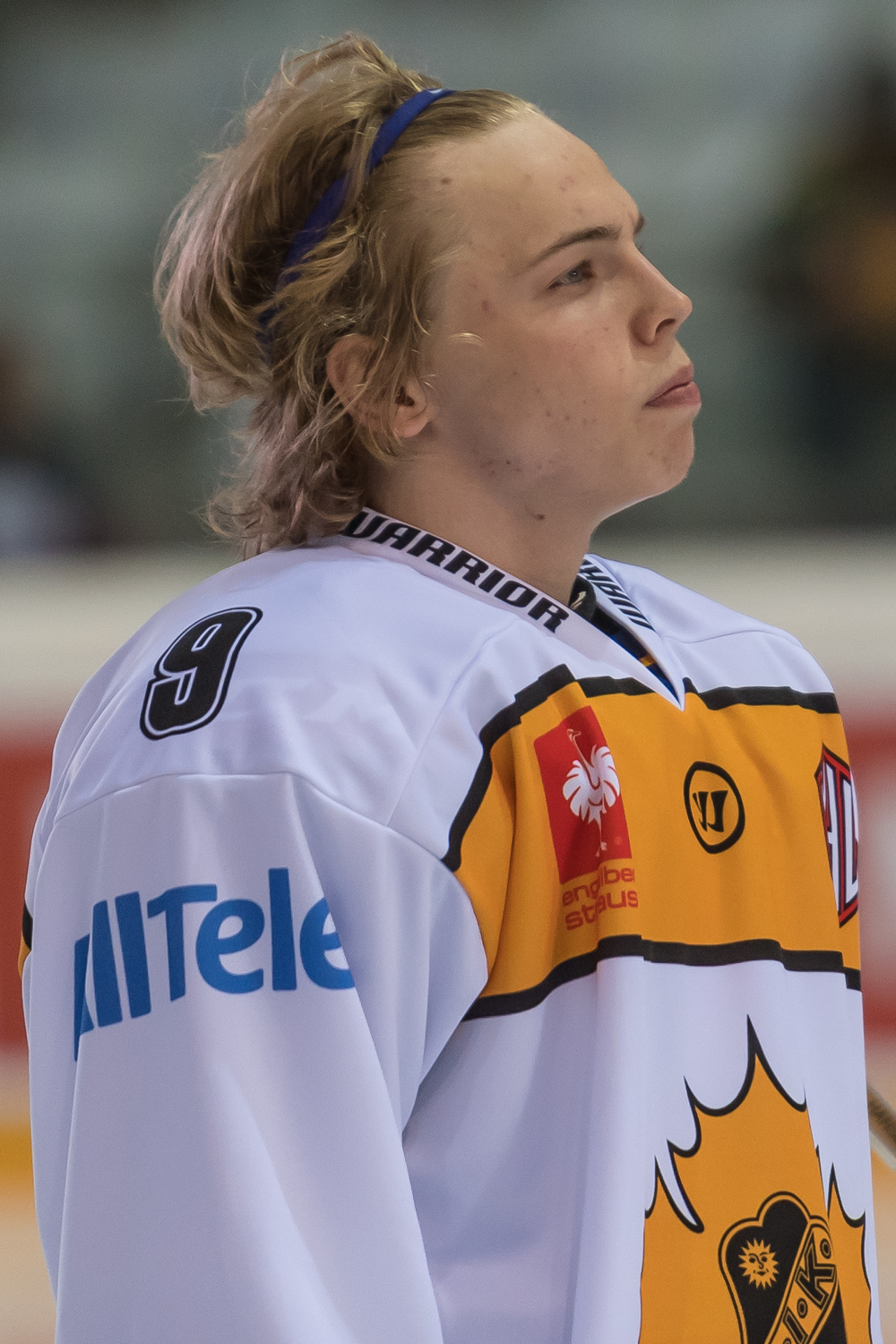
Tim Soderlund was selected 112th overall by the Chicago Blackhawks.

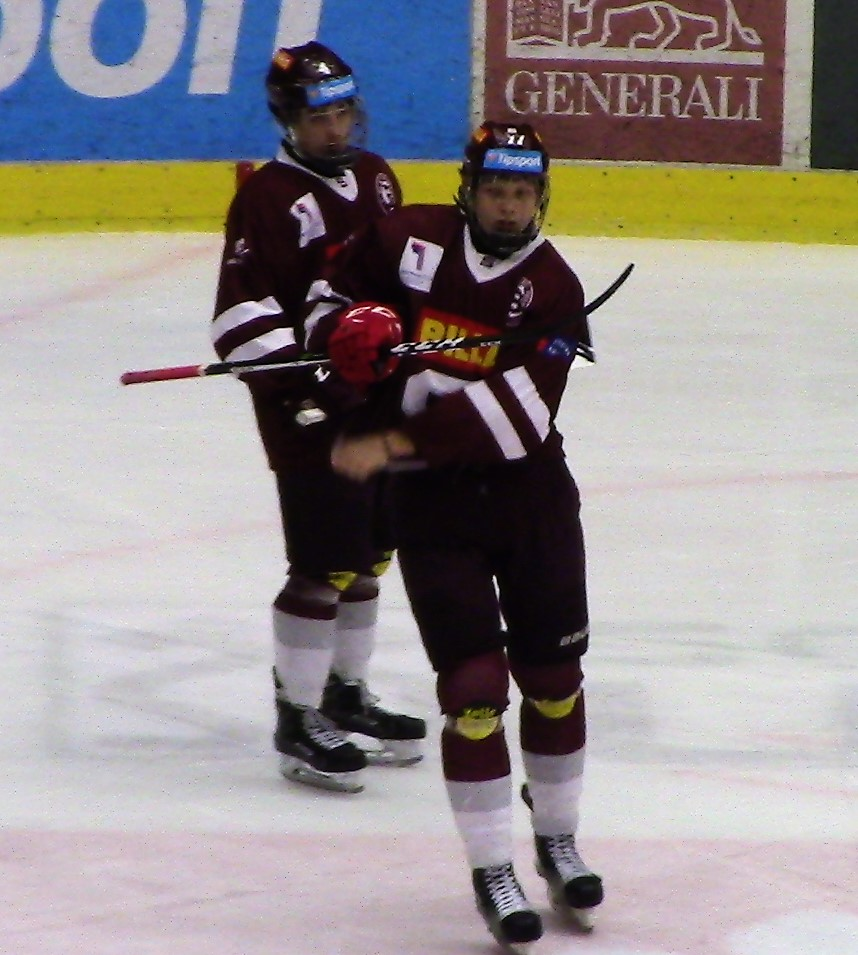
Ostap Safin was selected 115th overall by the Edmonton Oilers.

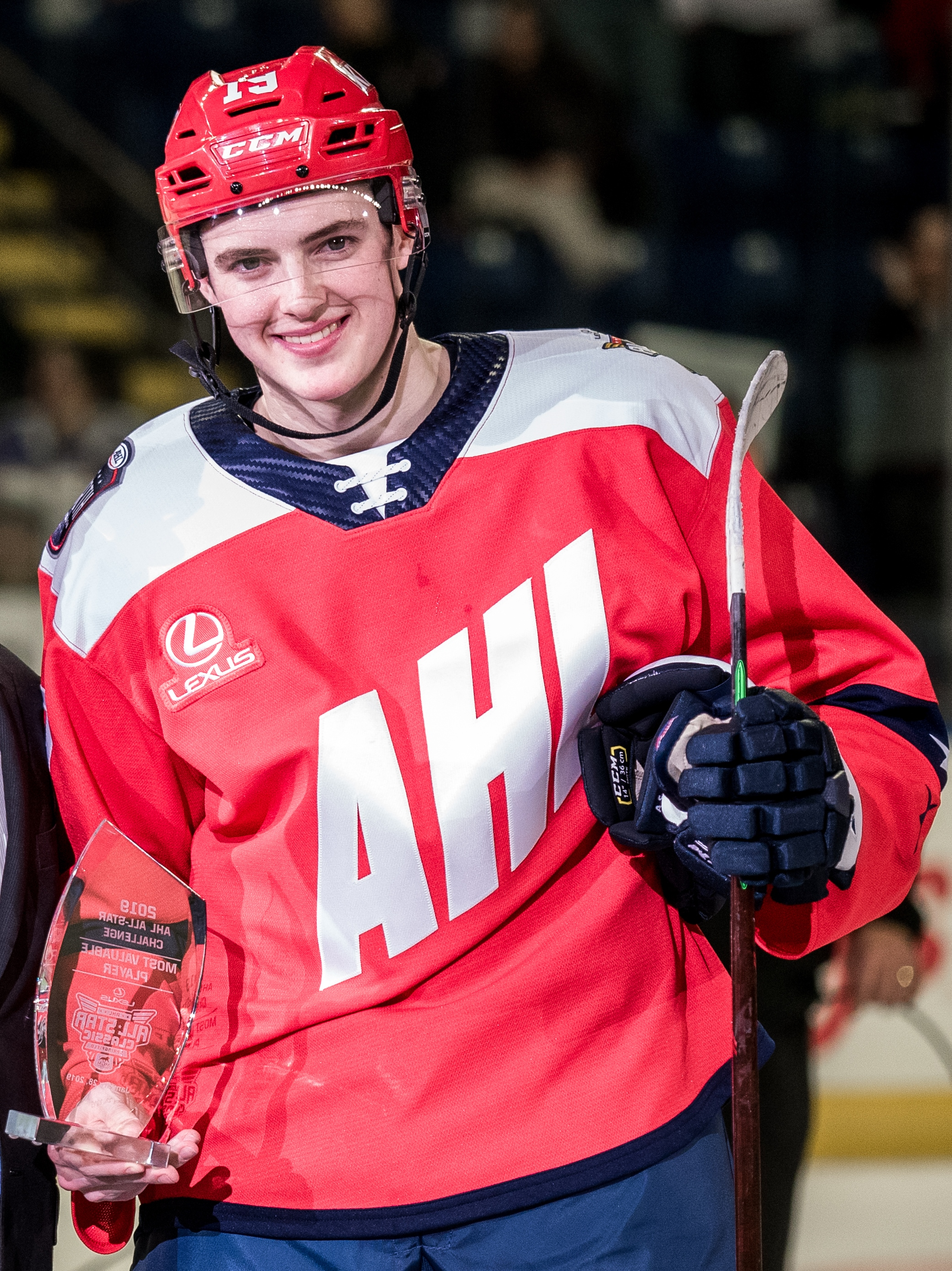
Drake Batherson was selected 121st overall by the Ottawa Senators.

#	Player	Nationality	NHL team	College/junior/club team
94	Nick Henry (RW)	Canada	Colorado Avalanche	Regina Pats (WHL)
95	Jack Rathbone (D)	United States	Vancouver Canucks	Dexter School (USHS)
96	Maksim Zhukov (G)	Russia	Vegas Golden Knights	Green Bay Gamblers (USHL)
97	Mason Shaw (C)	Canada	Minnesota Wild (from Arizona)^{1}	Medicine Hat Tigers (WHL)
98	Nikita Popugaev (RW)	Russia	New Jersey Devils	Prince George Cougars (WHL)
99	Jacob Bryson (D)	Canada	Buffalo Sabres	Providence College (Hockey East)
100	Malte Setkov (D)	Denmark	Detroit Red Wings	Malmo Redhawks J20 (SuperElit)
101	Liam Hawel (C)	Canada	Dallas Stars	Guelph Storm (OHL)
102	Scott Reedy (C)	United States	San Jose Sharks (from Florida via NY Rangers)^{2}	U.S. NTDP (USHL)
103	Mikey Anderson (D)	United States	Los Angeles Kings	Waterloo Black Hawks (USHL)
104	Eetu Makiniemi (G)	Finland	Carolina Hurricanes	Jokerit U20 (Jr. A SM-liiga)
105	Santeri Virtanen (F)	Finland	Winnipeg Jets	TPS U20 (Jr. A SM-liiga)
106	Matthew Strome (LW)	Canada	Philadelphia Flyers	Hamilton Bulldogs (OHL)
107	Maxim Sushko (RW)	Belarus	Philadelphia Flyers (from Tampa Bay)^{3}	Owen Sound Attack (OHL)
108	Noel Hoefenmayer (D)	Canada	Arizona Coyotes (from NY Islanders via Philadelphia)^{4}	Ottawa 67's (OHL)
109	Adam Ruzicka (C)	Slovakia	Calgary Flames	Sarnia Sting (OHL)
110	Ian Scott (G)	Canada	Toronto Maple Leafs	Prince Albert Raiders (WHL)
111	Jeremy Swayman (G)	United States	Boston Bruins	Sioux Falls Stampede (USHL)
112	Tim Soderlund (C/LW)	Sweden	Chicago Blackhawks (from San Jose via Vancouver)^{5}	Skelleftea AIK (SHL)
113	Alexei Toropchenko (F)	Russia	St. Louis Blues	HK MVD Balashikha (MHL)
114	Petr Kvaca (G)	Czech Republic	Colorado Avalanche (from NY Rangers)^{6}	Motor Ceske Budejovice (Cze-2)
115	Ostap Safin (RW)	Czech Republic	Edmonton Oilers	HC Sparta Praha (Czech Extraliga)
116	Bryce Misley (C)	Canada	Minnesota Wild	Oakville Blades (OJHL)
117	Emil Bemstrom (C)	Sweden	Columbus Blue Jackets	Leksands IF J20 (SuperElit)
118	Markus Phillips (D)	Canada	Los Angeles Kings (from Montreal via Dallas)^{7}	Owen Sound Attack (OHL)
119	Roope Laavainen (D)	Finland	Chicago Blackhawks	Jokerit U20 (Jr. A SM-liiga)
120	Tobias Geisser (D)	Switzerland	Washington Capitals	EV Zug (NLA)
121	Drake Batherson (C)	Canada	Ottawa Senators	Cape Breton Screaming Eagles (QMJHL)
122	Kyle Olson (C)	Canada	Anaheim Ducks	Tri-City Americans (WHL)
123	Brandon Crawley (D)	United States	New York Rangers (from Nashville via New Jersey and San Jose)^{8}	London Knights (OHL)
124	Vladislav Kara (C)	Russia	Toronto Maple Leafs (from Pittsburgh)^{9}	Irbis Kazan (MHL)

Notes

1. The Arizona Coyotes' fourth-round pick went to the Minnesota Wild as the result of a trade on February 26, 2017, that sent Grayson Downing, a first-round pick in 2017, a second-round pick in 2018 and a conditional fourth-round pick in 2019 to Arizona in exchange for Martin Hanzal, Ryan White and this pick.
2. The Florida Panthers' fourth-round pick went to the San Jose Sharks as the result of a trade on June 24, 2017, that sent Nashville's fourth-round pick and a sixth-round pick both in 2017 (123rd and 174th overall) to the New York Rangers in exchange for this pick.
  The Rangers previously acquired this pick as the result of a trade on June 20, 2016, that sent Keith Yandle to Florida in exchange for a sixth-round pick in 2016 and this pick (being conditional at the time of the trade). The condition – New York will receive a fourth-round pick in 2017 if Florida re-signs Yandle for the 2016–17 NHL season – was converted on June 23, 2016.
3. The Tampa Bay Lightning's fourth-round pick went to the Philadelphia Flyers as the result of a trade on March 1, 2017, that sent Mark Streit to Tampa Bay in exchange for Valtteri Filppula, a conditional seventh-round pick in 2017 and this pick.
4. The New York Islanders' fourth-round pick went to the Arizona Coyotes as the result of a trade on June 24, 2017, that sent a second-round pick in 2017 (35th overall) to Philadelphia in exchange for a second and third-round pick both in 2017 (44th and 75th overall) and this pick.
  Philadelphia previously acquired this pick as the result of a trade on June 25, 2016, that sent San Jose's fourth-round pick in 2016 to New York in exchange for this pick.
5. The San Jose Sharks' fourth-round pick went to the Chicago Blackhawks as the result of a trade on June 24, 2017, that sent Carolina's fifth-round pick and a sixth-round pick both in 2017 (135th and 181st overall) to Vancouver in exchange for this pick.
  Vancouver previously acquired this pick as the result of a trade on February 28, 2017, that sent Jannik Hansen to San Jose in exchange for Nikolay Goldobin and this pick (being conditional at the time of the trade). The condition – Vancouver will receive a fourth-round pick in 2017 if San Jose does not win the Stanley Cup during the 2016–17 NHL season – was converted on April 22, 2017.
6. The New York Rangers' fourth-round pick went to the Colorado Avalanche as the result of a trade on June 25, 2016, that sent Nick Holden to New York in exchange for this pick.
7. The Montreal Canadiens' fourth-round pick went to the Los Angeles Kings as the result of a trade on May 9, 2017, that sent Ben Bishop to Dallas in exchange for this pick.
  Dallas previously acquired this pick as the result of a trade on February 27, 2017, that sent Jordie Benn to Montreal in exchange for Greg Pateryn and this pick.
8. The Nashville Predators' fourth-round pick went to the New York Rangers as the result of a trade on June 24, 2017, that sent Florida's fourth-round pick in 2017 (102nd overall) to San Jose in exchange for a sixth-round pick in 2017 (174th overall) and this pick.
  San Jose previously acquired this pick as the result of a trade on June 17, 2017, that sent Mirco Muller and a fifth-round pick in 2017 to New Jersey in exchange for Boston's second-round pick in 2017 and this pick.
  New Jersey previously acquired this pick as the result of a trade on February 4, 2017, that sent Vernon Fiddler to Nashville in exchange for this pick.
9. The Pittsburgh Penguins' fourth-round pick went to the Toronto Maple Leafs as the result of a trade on March 1, 2017, that sent Frank Corrado to Pittsburgh in exchange for Eric Fehr, Steve Oleksy and this pick.

=== Round five ===
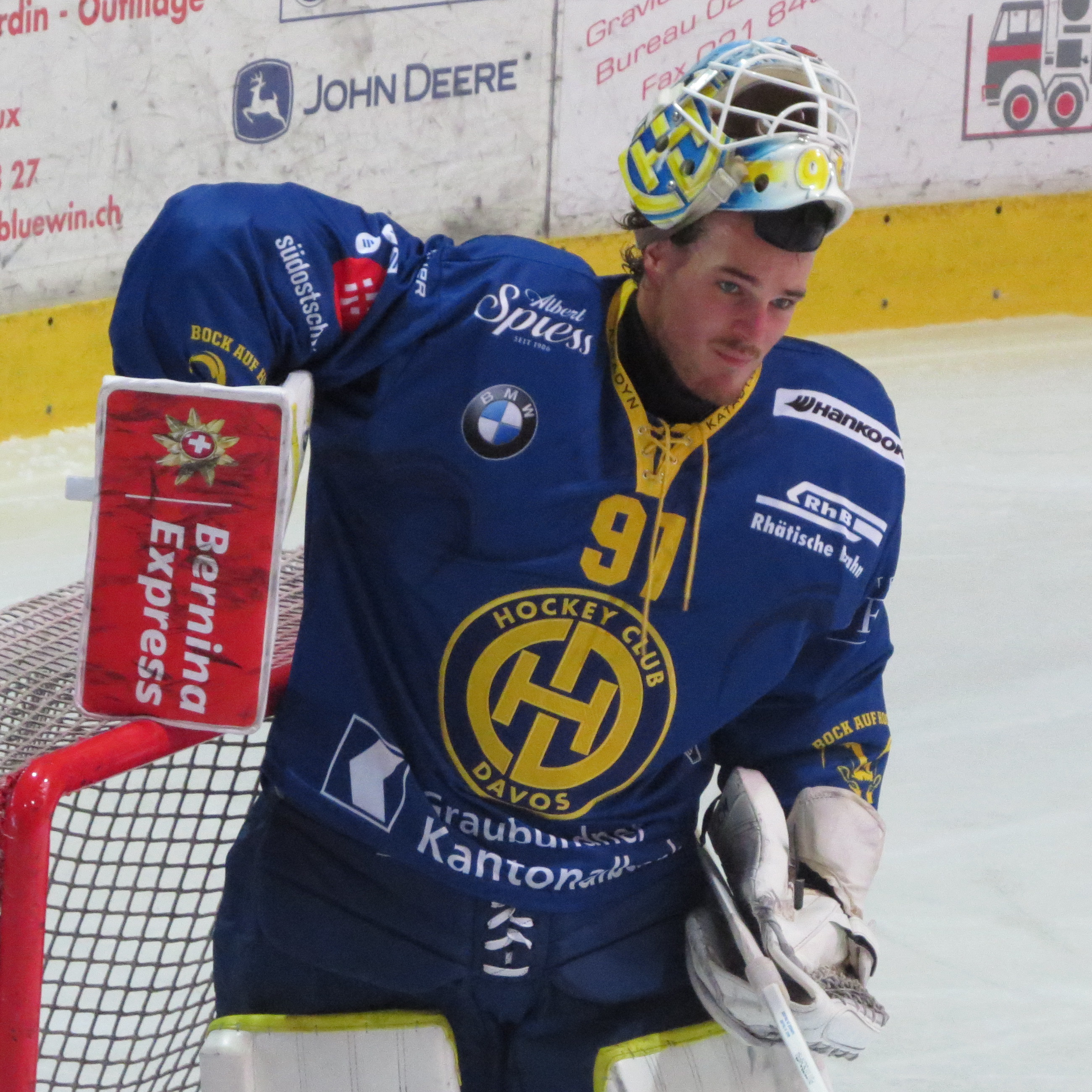
Gilles Senn was selected 129th overall by the New Jersey Devils.

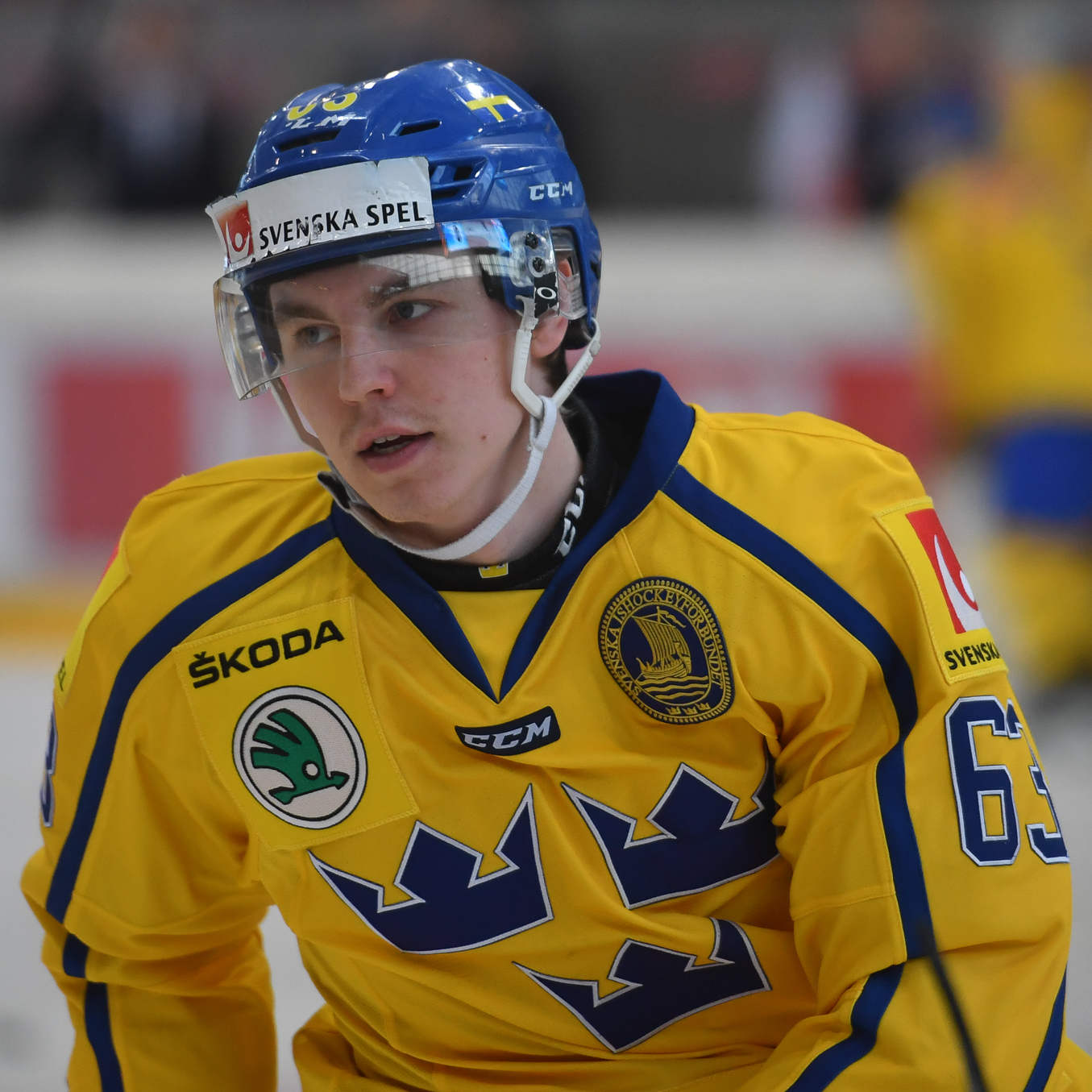
Sebastian Aho was selected 139th overall by the New York Islanders.

#	Player	Nationality	NHL team	College/junior/club team
125	Igor Shvyrov (C)	Russia	Colorado Avalanche	Stalnye Lisy (MHL)
126	Michael Karow (D)	United States	Arizona Coyotes (from Vancouver via Edmonton)^{1}	Youngstown Phantoms (USHL)
127	Lucas Elvenes (RW)	Sweden	Vegas Golden Knights	Rogle BK J20 (SuperElit)
128	Tyler Steenbergen (C)	Canada	Arizona Coyotes	Swift Current Broncos (WHL)
129	Gilles Senn (G)	Switzerland	New Jersey Devils	HC Davos (NLA)
130	David Noel (D)	Canada	St. Louis Blues (from Buffalo)^{2}	Val-d'Or Foreurs (QMJHL)
131	Cole Fraser (D)	Canada	Detroit Red Wings	Peterborough Petes (OHL)
132	Jacob Peterson (C)	Sweden	Dallas Stars	Frolunda HC J20 (SuperElit)
133	Tyler Inamoto (D)	United States	Florida Panthers	U.S. NTDP (USHL)
134	Cole Hults (D)	United States	Los Angeles Kings	Madison Capitals (USHL)
135	Kristoffer Gunnarsson (D)	Sweden	Vancouver Canucks (from Carolina via Chicago)^{3}	IK Oskarshamn (HockeyAllsvenskan)
136	Leon Gawanke (D)	Germany	Winnipeg Jets	Cape Breton Screaming Eagles (QMJHL)
137	Noah Cates (LW)	United States	Philadelphia Flyers	Stillwater High (USHS)
138	Drake Rymsha (C)	United States	Los Angeles Kings (from Tampa Bay)^{4}	Sarnia Sting (OHL)
139	Sebastian Aho (D)	Sweden	New York Islanders	Skelleftea AIK (SHL)
140	Zach Fischer (RW)	Canada	Calgary Flames	Medicine Hat Tigers (WHL)
141	Fedor Gordeev (D)	Canada	Toronto Maple Leafs	Flint Firebirds (OHL)
142	Jonathan Dugan (C)	United States	Vegas Golden Knights (from Boston via Carolina)^{5}	Northwood School (USHS)
143	Marian Studenic (RW)	Slovakia	New Jersey Devils (from San Jose)^{6}	Hamilton Bulldogs (OHL)
144	Parker Foo (F)	Canada	Chicago Blackhawks (from St. Louis)^{7}	Brooks Bandits (AJHL)
145	Calle Sjalin (D)	Sweden	New York Rangers	Ostersunds IK (Hockeyettan)
146	Kirill Maksimov (RW)	Russia	Edmonton Oilers	Niagara (OHL)
147	Jacob Golden (D)	Canada	Minnesota Wild	London Knights (OHL)
148	Kale Howarth (LW)	Canada	Columbus Blue Jackets	Trail Smoke Eaters (BCHL)
149	Jarret Tyszka (D)	Canada	Montreal Canadiens	Seattle Thunderbirds (WHL)
150	Jakub Galvas (D)	Czech Republic	Chicago Blackhawks	HC Olomouc (Czech Extraliga)
151	Sebastian Walfridsson (D)	Sweden	Washington Capitals	MODO J20 (SuperElit)
152	Jan Drozg (LW)	Slovenia	Pittsburgh Penguins (from Ottawa)^{8}	Leksand U18 (J18 Elit)
153	Olle Eriksson Ek (G)	Sweden	Anaheim Ducks	Farjestad BK J20 (SuperElit)
154	Tomas Vomacka (G)	Czech Republic	Nashville Predators	Corpus Christi IceRays (NAHL)
155	Linus Olund (C)	Sweden	Pittsburgh Penguins	Brynas IF (SHL)

Notes

1. The Vancouver Canucks' fifth-round pick went to the Arizona Coyotes as the result of a trade on June 24, 2017, that sent Calgary's third-round pick in 2017 (78th overall) to Edmonton in exchange for St. Louis' third-round pick in 2017 (82nd overall) and this pick.
  Edmonton previously acquired this pick as the result of a trade on February 24, 2016, that sent Philip Larsen to Vancouver in exchange for this pick (being conditional at the time of the trade). The condition — Edmonton will receive a fifth-round pick in 2017 if Larsen fails to maintain a scoring rate of 0.3 points per game over the 2016–17 NHL season with a minimum of 42 games played — was converted on March 4, 2017, when it became mathematically impossible for Larsen to appear in 42 games during the 2016–17 season.
2. The Buffalo Sabres' fifth-round pick went to the St. Louis Blues as the result of a trade on July 2, 2016, that sent Anders Nilsson to Buffalo in exchange for this pick.
3. The Carolina Hurricanes' fifth-round pick went to the Vancouver Canucks as the result of a trade on June 24, 2017, that sent San Jose's fourth-round pick in 2017 (112th overall) to Chicago in exchange for a sixth-round pick in 2017 (181st overall) and this pick.
  Chicago previously acquired this pick as the result of a trade on September 11, 2015, that sent Kris Versteeg, Joakim Nordstrom and a third-round pick in 2017 to Carolina in exchange for Dennis Robertson, Jake Massie and this pick.
4. The Tampa Bay Lightning's fifth-round pick went to the Los Angeles Kings as the result of a trade on February 26, 2017, that sent Peter Budaj, Erik Cernak, a conditional pick in 2017 and a seventh-round pick in 2017 in exchange for Ben Bishop and this pick.
5. The Boston Bruins' fifth-round pick went to the Vegas Golden Knights as the result of a trade on June 21, 2017, that ensured that Vegas selected Connor Brickley in the 2017 NHL expansion draft from Carolina in exchange for this pick.
  Carolina previously acquired this pick as the result of a trade on February 29, 2016, that sent John-Michael Liles to Boston in exchange for Anthony Camara, a third-round pick in 2016 and this pick.
6. The San Jose Sharks' fifth-round pick went to the New Jersey Devils as the result of a trade on June 17, 2017, that sent Boston's second-round pick and Nashville's fourth-round pick both in 2017 to San Jose in exchange for Mirco Muller and this pick.
7. The St. Louis Blues' fifth-round pick went to the Chicago Blackhawks as the result of a trade on June 25, 2016, that sent a Florida's fifth-round pick in 2016 to St. Louis in exchange for this pick.
8. The Ottawa Senators' fifth-round pick went to the Pittsburgh Penguins as the result of a trade on November 2, 2016, that sent Mike Condon to Ottawa exchange for this pick.

=== Round six ===
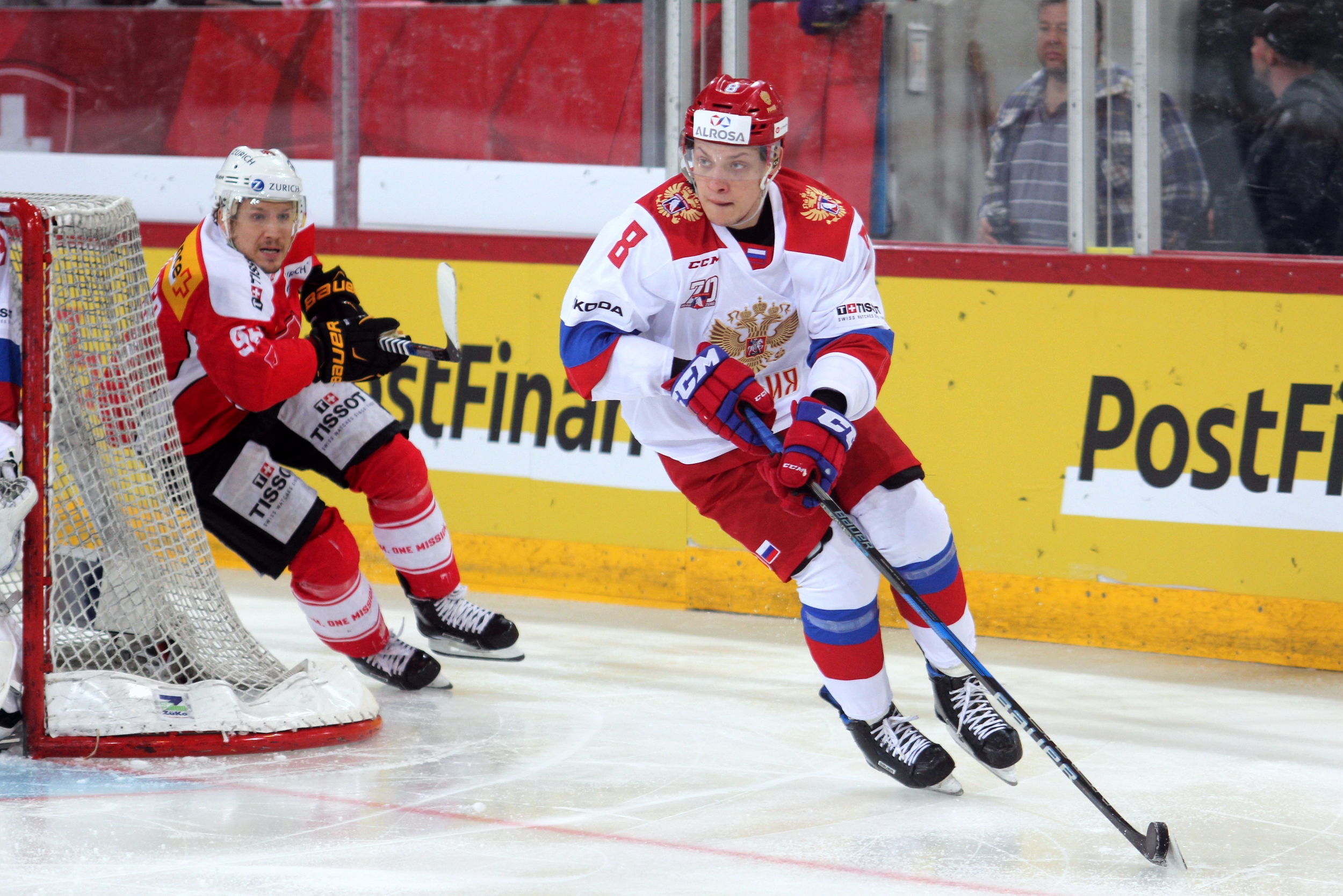
Andrei Svetlakov was selected 178th overall by the Minnesota Wild.

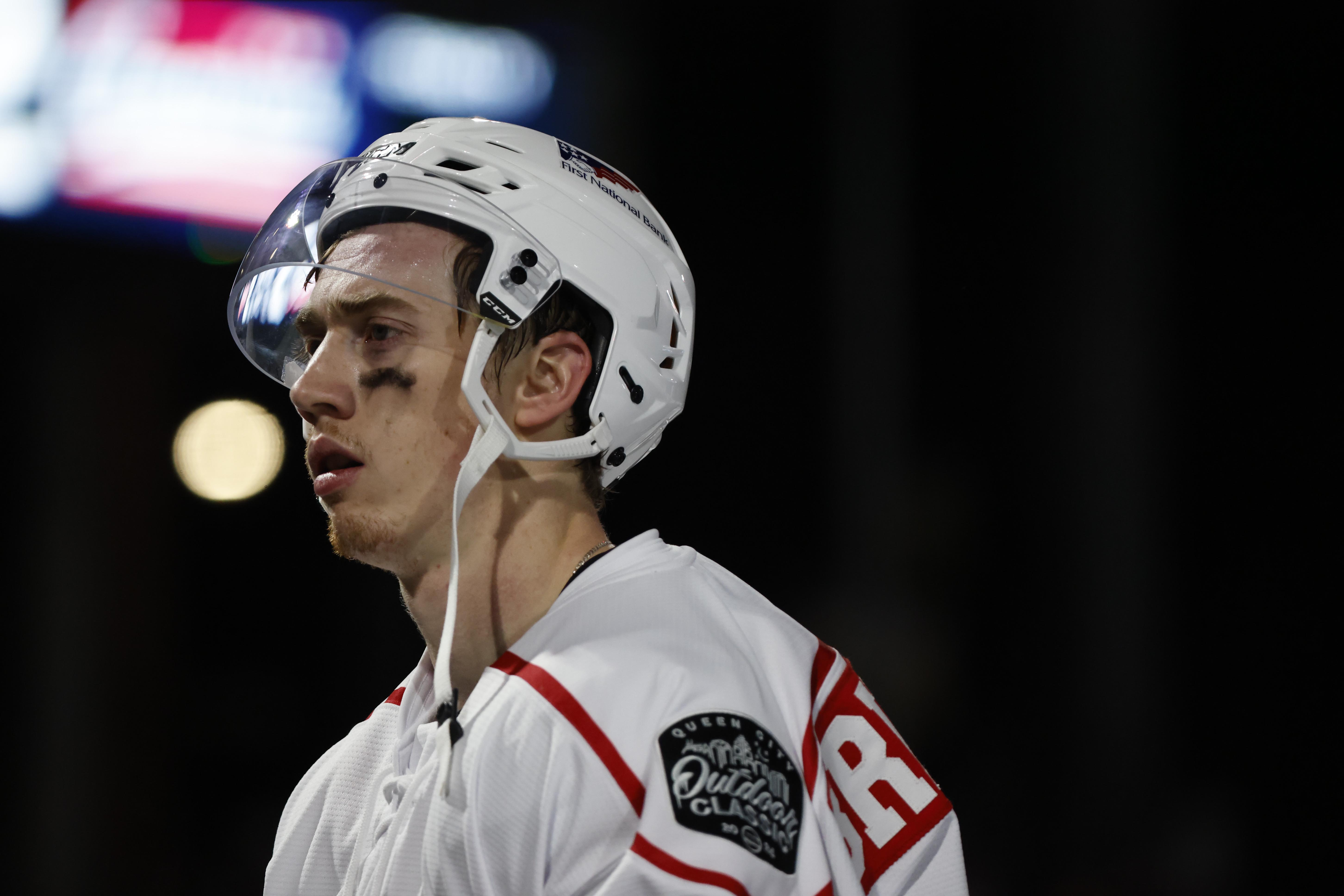
Skyler Brind'Amour was selected 177th overall in by the Edmonton Oilers.

#	Player	Nationality	NHL team	College/junior/club team
156	Denis Smirnov (RW)	Russia	Colorado Avalanche (from Colorado via San Jose)^{1}	Penn State University (B1G)
157	Dominik Lakatos (C)	Czech Republic	New York Rangers (from Vancouver)^{2}	Bili Tygri Liberec (Czech Extraliga)
158	Nick Campoli (C)	Canada	Vegas Golden Knights	North York Rangers (OJHL)
159	Jacob McGrew (RW)	United States	San Jose Sharks (from Arizona)^{3}	Spokane Chiefs (WHL)
160	Aarne Talvitie (C)	Finland	New Jersey Devils	Blues U20 (Jr. A SM-liiga)
161	Jiri Patera (G)	Czech Republic	Vegas Golden Knights (from Buffalo)^{4}	HC Ceske Budejovice U20 (Czech U20)
162	John Adams (RW)	United States	Detroit Red Wings	Fargo Force (USHL)
163	Brett Davis (RW)	Canada	Dallas Stars	Kootenay Ice (WHL)
164	Reilly Webb (D)	Canada	Detroit Red Wings (from Florida)^{5}	Hamilton Bulldogs (OHL)
165	Arnaud Durandeau (LW)	Canada	New York Islanders (from Los Angeles)^{6}	Halifax Mooseheads (QMJHL)
166	Brendan De Jong (D)	Canada	Carolina Hurricanes	Portland Winterhawks (WHL)
167	Arvid Holm (G)	Sweden	Winnipeg Jets	Karlskrona HK J20 (SuperElit)
168	Olle Lycksell (RW)	Sweden	Philadelphia Flyers	Linkoping HC J20 (SuperElit)
169	Nick Perbix (D)	United States	Tampa Bay Lightning	Elk River High (USHS)
170	Jonathan Davidsson (RW)	Sweden	Columbus Blue Jackets (from NY Islanders via Chicago)^{7}	Djurgardens IF (SHL)
171	D'Artagnan Joly (RW)	Canada	Calgary Flames	Baie-Comeau Drakkar (QMJHL)
172	Ryan McGregor (C)	Canada	Toronto Maple Leafs	Sarnia Sting (OHL)
173	Cedric Pare (C)	Canada	Boston Bruins	Saint John Sea Dogs (QMJHL)
174	Morgan Barron (C)	Canada	New York Rangers (from San Jose)^{8}	St. Andrew's College (CISAA)
175	Trenton Bourque (D)	Canada	St. Louis Blues	Owen Sound (OHL)
176	Pavel Koltygin (C)	Russia	Nashville Predators (from NY Rangers)^{9}	Drummondville Voltigeurs(QMJHL)
177	Skyler Brind'Amour (C)	United States	Edmonton Oilers	Selects Academy U18 (USPHL 18U)
178	Andrei Svetlakov (C)	Russia	Minnesota Wild	CSKA Moscow (KHL)
179	Carson Meyer (RW)	United States	Columbus Blue Jackets	Miami University (NCHC)
180	Cole Guttman (C)	United States	Tampa Bay Lightning (from Montreal)^{10}	Dubuque Fighting Saints (USHL)
181	Petrus Palmu (RW)	Finland	Vancouver Canucks (from Chicago)^{11}	Owen Sound Attack (OHL)
182	Benton Maass (D)	United States	Washington Capitals	Elk River High (USHS)
183	Jordan Hollett (G)	Canada	Ottawa Senators	Regina Pats (WHL)
184	Sebastian Repo (RW)	Finland	Florida Panthers (from Anaheim)^{12}	Tappara (Liiga)
185	Alexander Chmelevski (C)	United States	San Jose Sharks (from Nashville via New Jersey)^{13}	Ottawa 67's (OHL)
186	Antti Palojarvi (D)	Finland	Pittsburgh Penguins	Lukko U20 (Jr. A SM-liiga)

Notes

1. The Colorado Avalanche's sixth-round pick was re-acquired as the result of a trade on June 27, 2015, that sent Buffalo's second-round pick in 2015 to San Jose in exchange for a second-round pick in 2015, Colorado's second-round pick in 2016 and this pick.
  San Jose previously acquired this pick as the result of a trade on July 1, 2014, that sent Brad Stuart to Colorado in exchange for a second-round pick in 2016 and this pick.
2. The Vancouver Canucks' sixth-round pick went to the New York Rangers as the result of a trade on January 8, 2016, that sent Emerson Etem to Vancouver in exchange for Nicklas Jensen and this pick.
3. The Arizona Coyotes' sixth-round pick went to the San Jose Sharks as the result of a trade on June 20, 2016, that sent a fourth-round pick in 2016 and Detroit's third-round pick in 2017 to Arizona in exchange for Maxim Letunov and this pick.
4. The Buffalo Sabres' sixth-round pick went to the Vegas Golden Knights as the result of a trade on June 21, 2017, that ensured that Vegas selected William Carrier in the 2017 NHL expansion draft from Buffalo in exchange for this pick.
5. The Florida Panthers' sixth-round pick went to the Detroit Red Wings as the result of a trade on February 27, 2016, that sent Jakub Kindl to Florida in exchange for this pick.
6. The Los Angeles Kings' sixth-round pick went to the New York Islanders as the result of a trade on June 24, 2017, that sent a sixth-round pick in 2018 to Los Angeles in exchange for this pick.
7. The New York Islanders' sixth-round pick went to the Columbus Blue Jackets as the result of a trade on June 23, 2017, that sent Brandon Saad, Anton Forsberg and a fifth-round pick in 2018 to Chicago in exchange for Artemi Panarin, Tyler Motte and this pick.
  Chicago previously acquired this pick as the result of a trade on June 25, 2016, that sent Columbus' fourth-round pick in 2016 to New York in exchange for a fourth-round pick in 2016 and this pick.
8. The San Jose Sharks' sixth-round pick went to the New York Rangers as the result of a trade on June 24, 2017, that sent Florida's fourth-round pick in 2017 (102nd overall) to San Jose in exchange for Nashville's fourth-round pick in 2017 (123rd overall) and this pick.
9. The New York Rangers' sixth-round pick went to the Nashville Predators as the result of a trade on July 1, 2015, that sent Magnus Hellberg to New York in exchange for this pick.
10. The Montreal Canadiens' sixth-round pick went to the Tampa Bay Lightning as the result of a trade on January 26, 2017, that sent Nikita Nesterov to Montreal in exchange for Jonathan Racine and this pick.
11. The Chicago Blackhawks' sixth-round pick went to the Vancouver Canucks as the result of a trade on June 24, 2017, that sent San Jose's fourth-round pick in 2017 (112th overall) to Chicago in exchange for Carolina's fifth-round pick in 2017 (135th overall) and this pick.
12. The Anaheim Ducks' sixth-round pick went to the Florida Panthers as the result of a trade on December 4, 2014, that sent Colby Robak to Anaheim in exchange for Jesse Blacker and this pick (being conditional at the time of the trade). The condition — Florida will receive a sixth-round pick in 2017 dependent on how many games Robak played for Anaheim during the 2014–15 NHL season — the date of conversion is unknown.
13. The Nashville Predators' sixth-round pick went to the San Jose Sharks as the result of a trade on June 24, 2017, that sent San Jose and Ottawa's seventh-round picks in 2017 (205th and 214th overall) to New Jersey in exchange for this pick.
  New Jersey previously acquired this pick as the result of a trade on March 1, 2017, that sent P. A. Parenteau to Nashville in exchange for this pick.

=== Round seven ===
#	Player	Nationality	NHL team	College/junior/club team
187	Nick Leivermann (D)	United States	Colorado Avalanche	Eden Prairie High (USHS)
188	Matt Brassard (D)	Canada	Vancouver Canucks	Oshawa Generals (OHL)
189	Ben Jones (C)	Canada	Vegas Golden Knights	Niagara IceDogs (OHL)
190	Erik Walli-Walterholm (RW)	Sweden	Arizona Coyotes	Djurgardens IF J18 (J18-Allsv.)
191	Jocktan Chainey (D)	Canada	New Jersey Devils	Halifax Mooseheads (QMJHL)
192	Linus Weissbach (LW)	Sweden	Buffalo Sabres	Tri-City Storm (USHL)
193	Brady Gilmour (C)	Canada	Detroit Red Wings	Saginaw Spirit (OHL)
194	Dylan Ferguson (G)	Canada	Dallas Stars	Kamloops Blazers (WHL)
195	Victor Berglund (D)	Sweden	Boston Bruins (from Florida)^{1}	MODO J20 (SuperElit.)
196	Wyatt Kalynuk (D)	Canada	Philadelphia Flyers (from Los Angeles via Tampa Bay)^{2}	Bloomington Thunder (USHL)
197	Ville Rasanen (D)	Finland	Carolina Hurricanes	Jokipojat (Mestis)
198	Skyler McKenzie (LW)	Canada	Winnipeg Jets	Portland Winterhawks (WHL)
199	Cayden Primeau (G)	United States	Montreal Canadiens (from Philadelphia)^{3}	Lincoln Stars (USHL)
200	Samuel Walker (C)	United States	Tampa Bay Lightning	Edina High (USHS)
201	Logan Cockerill (LW)	United States	New York Islanders	U.S. NTDP (USHL)
202	Filip Sveningsson (LW)	Sweden	Calgary Flames	HV71 J20 (SuperElit)
203	Ryan O'Connell (D)	Canada	Toronto Maple Leafs	St. Andrew's College (CISAA)
204	Daniel Bukac (D)	Czech Republic	Boston Bruins	Brandon Wheat Kings (WHL)
205	Yegor Zaitsev (D)	Russia	New Jersey Devils (from San Jose)^{4}	Dynamo Moscow (KHL)
206	Anton Andersson (D)	Sweden	St. Louis Blues	Lulea HF J20 (SuperElit)
207	Patrik Virta (C)	Finland	New York Rangers	TPS (Liiga)
208	Philip Kemp (D)	United States	Edmonton Oilers	U.S. NTDP (USHL)
209	Nick Swaney (RW)	United States	Minnesota Wild	Waterloo Black Hawks (USHL)
210	Robbie Stucker (D)	United States	Columbus Blue Jackets	St. Thomas Academy (USHS)
211	Croix Evingson (D)	United States	Winnipeg Jets (from Montreal)^{5}	Shreveport Mudbugs (NAHL)
212	Ivan Chekhovich (LW)	Russia	San Jose Sharks (from Chicago)^{6}	Baie-Comeau Drakkar (QMJHL)
213	Kristian Roykas Marthinsen (LW)	Norway	Washington Capitals	Almtuna IS J20 (J20 Elit)
214	Matthew Hellickson (D)	United States	New Jersey Devils (from Ottawa via San Jose)^{7}	Sioux City Musketeers (USHL)
215	Joshua Ess (D)	United States	Chicago Blackhawks (from Anaheim)^{8}	Lakeville South (USHS)
216	Jacob Paquette (D)	Canada	Nashville Predators	Kingston Frontenacs (OHL)
217	William Reilly (D)	Canada	Pittsburgh Penguins	RPI (ECAC)

Notes

1. The Florida Panthers' seventh-round pick went to the Boston Bruins as the result of a trade on June 25, 2016, that sent a seventh-round pick in 2016 to Florida in exchange for this pick.
2. The Los Angeles Kings' seventh-round pick went to the Philadelphia Flyers as the result of a trade on March 1, 2017, that sent Mark Streit to Tampa Bay in exchange for Valtteri Filppula, a fourth-round pick in 2017 and this pick (being conditional at the time of the trade). The condition – Philadelphia will receive Los Angeles' seventh-round pick in 2017 if Tampa Bay trades Streit – was converted on March 1, 2017, when Streit was traded to Pittsburgh.
  Tampa Bay previously acquired this pick as the result of a trade on February 26, 2017, that sent Ben Bishop and a fifth-round pick in 2017 to Los Angeles in exchange for Peter Budaj, Erik Cernak, a conditional pick in 2017 and this pick.
3. The Philadelphia Flyers' seventh-round pick went to the Montreal Canadiens as the result of a trade on June 24, 2017, that sent a seventh-round pick in 2018 to Philadelphia in exchange for this pick.
4. The San Jose Sharks' seventh-round pick went to the New Jersey Devils as the result of a trade on June 24, 2017, that sent Nashville's sixth-round pick in 2017 (185th overall) to San Jose in exchange for Ottawa's seventh-round pick in 2017 (214th overall) and this pick.
5. The Montreal Canadiens' seventh-round pick went to the Winnipeg Jets as the result of a trade on June 25, 2016, that sent a seventh-round pick in 2016 to Montreal in exchange for this pick.
6. The Chicago Blackhawks' seventh-round pick went to the San Jose Sharks as the result of a trade on March 2, 2015, that sent Andrew Desjardins to Chicago in exchange for Ben Smith and this pick (being conditional at the time of the trade). The condition – San Jose will receive a seventh-round pick in 2017 if Chicago wins the Stanley Cup in 2015 – was converted on June 15, 2015.
7. The Ottawa Senators' seventh-round pick went to the New Jersey Devils as the result of a trade on June 24, 2017, that sent Nashville's sixth-round pick in 2017 (185th overall) to San Jose in exchange for a seventh-round pick in 2017 (205th overall) and this pick.
  San Jose previously acquired this pick as the result of a trade on January 24, 2017, that sent Tommy Wingels to Ottawa in exchange for Buddy Robinson, Zack Stortini and this pick.
8. The Anaheim Ducks' seventh-round pick went to the Chicago Blackhawks as the result of a trade on February 29, 2016, that sent Corey Tropp to Anaheim in exchange for Tim Jackman and this pick.

== Draftees based on nationality ==
Rank	Country	Selections	Percent	Top selection
	North America	128	59.0%	
1	Canada	81	37.3%	Nolan Patrick, 2nd
2	United States	47	21.7%	Casey Mittelstadt, 8th
	Europe	89	41.0%	
3	Sweden	27	12.4%	Elias Pettersson, 5th
4	Finland	23	10.6%	Miro Heiskanen, 3rd
5	Russia	18	8.3%	Klim Kostin, 31st
6	Czech Republic	9	4.1%	Martin Necas, 12th
7	Switzerland	3	1.4%	Nico Hischier, 1st
8	Denmark	2	0.9%	Jonas Rondbjerg, 65th
8	Slovakia	2	0.9%	Adam Ruzicka, 109th
10	France	1	0.5%	Alexandre Texier, 45th
10	Belarus	1	0.5%	Maxim Sushko, 107th
10	Germany	1	0.5%	Leon Gawanke, 136th
10	Slovenia	1	0.5%	Jan Drozg, 152nd
10	Norway	1	0.5%	Kristian Roykas Marthinsen, 213th

=== North American draftees by state/province ===
Rank	State/province	Selections	Percent	Top selection
1	Ontario	37	17.1%	Owen Tippett, 10th
2	Minnesota	17	7.8%	Casey Mittelstadt, 8th
3	Alberta	14	6.5%	Cale Makar, 4th
4	Quebec	9	4.1%	Pierre-Olivier Joseph, 23rd
5	Manitoba	8	3.7%	Nolan Patrick, 2nd
6	British Columbia	6	2.8%	Michael Rasmussen, 9th
7	Michigan	4	1.8%	Josh Norris, 19th
7	Massachusetts	4	1.8%	Ben Mirageas, 77th
7	California	4	1.8%	Ivan Lodnia, 85th
10	Nova Scotia	3	1.4%	Shane Bowers, 28th
10	Saskatchewan	3	1.4%	Kole Lind, 33rd
12	Pennsylvania	2	0.9%	Evan Barratt, 90th
12	Connecticut	2	0.9%	Jack Badini, 91st
12	Alaska	2	0.9%	Jeremy Swayman, 111th
12	New Jersey	2	0.9%	Brandon Crawley, 123rd
12	Wisconsin	2	0.9%	Michael Karow, 126th
17	Colorado	1	0.5%	Callan Foote, 14th
17	Washington	1	0.5%	Kailer Yamamoto, 22nd
17	Missouri	1	0.5%	Luke Martin, 52nd
17	Texas	1	0.5%	Max Gildon, 66th
17	New Hampshire	1	0.5%	Reilly Walsh, 81st
17	New York	1	0.5%	David Farrance, 92nd
17	Illinois	1	0.5%	Tyler Inamoto, 133rd
17	North Carolina	1	0.5%	Skyler Brind'Amour, 177th
17	Ohio	1	0.5%	Carson Meyer, 179th

== See also ==
- 2013–14 NHL transactions
- 2014–15 NHL transactions
- 2015–16 NHL transactions
- 2016–17 NHL transactions
- 2017–18 NHL transactions
- 2017–18 NHL season
- 2017 NHL expansion draft
- List of first overall NHL draft picks
- List of NHL players
