= Mark Frank (athlete) =

German javelin thrower

Mark Fränk (born 21 June 1977 in Neustrelitz) is a retired German track and field athlete who competed in the javelin throw. His personal best throw is 84.88 m, achieved in 2005.

== Achievements ==
| Year | Competition | Venue | Position | Notes |
Representing Germany
| 1999 | European U23 Championships | Gothenburg, Sweden | 3rd | 77.62 m |
| 2005 | World Championships | Helsinki, Finland | 8th | 77.56 m |
| 2005 | World Athletics Final | Monte Carlo, Monaco | 5th | 81.81 m |
| 2009 | World Athletics Final | Thessaloniki, Greece | 3rd | 82.46 m |
| 2011 | World Championships | Daegu, South Korea | 8th | 81.81 m |

== Seasonal bests by year ==
- 1999 - 77.62
- 2001 - 78.54
- 2002 - 83.24
- 2003 - 80.55
- 2004 - 81.21
- 2005 - 84.88
- 2006 - 81.98
- 2007 - 82.23
- 2009 - 83.86
- 2010 - 80.46
- 2011 - 82.54
- 2012 - 81.50
