= Ville Räsänen =

Finnish ice hockey player (born 1998)

- Born: 8 October 1998 (age 28) Joensuu, Finland
- Height: 6 ft 2 in (188 cm)
- Weight: 168 lb (76 kg; 12 st 0 lb)
- Position: Defense
- Shoots: Left
- team Former teams: Free Agent; Mikkelin Jukurit
- NHL draft: 197th overall, 2017; Carolina Hurricanes
- Playing career: 2016–present

Ville Räsänen (born 8 October 1998) is a Finnish professional ice hockey player who is currently an unrestricted free agent. He most recently played in his native Finland for Jokipojat of the Mestis. He was selected by the Carolina Hurricanes in the seventh round, 197th overall, in the 2017 NHL entry draft.

== Career statistics ==
			Regular season					Playoffs
Season	Team	League	GP	G	A	Pts	PIM	GP	G	A	Pts	PIM
2016–17	Jokipojat	Mestis	21	1	5	6	6	3	0	1	1	0
2017–18	Mikkelin Jukurit	Liiga	4	0	0	0	0	—	—	—	—	—
2017–18	Rovaniemen Kiekko	Mestis	9	1	2	3	0	—	—	—	—	—
2018–19	Lincoln Stars	USHL	8	0	0	0	0	—	—	—	—	—
2018–19	Chicago Steel	USHL	42	1	4	5	2	6	0	0	0	0
2019–20	Jokipojat	Mestis	40	3	14	17	16	—	—	—	—	—
2020–21	JoKP	Mestis	23	3	9	12	8	6	0	3	3	0
2021–22	JoKP	Mestis	10	0	3	3	2	3	0	0	0	0
Liiga totals			4	0	0	0	0	—	—	—	—	—
