= Modern pentathlon at the 1952 Summer Olympics – Men's team =

Men's team modern pentathlon at the Games of the XV Olympiad
- Venue: Hämeenlinna
- Dates: July 21–25
- Competitors: 48 from 16 nations

Medalists
| 1st place, gold medalist(s) | | Gábor Benedek; István Szondy; Aladár Kovácsi | Hungary |
| 2nd place, silver medalist(s) | | Lars Hall; Thorsten Lindqvist; Claes Egnell | Sweden |
| 3rd place, bronze medalist(s) | | Olavi Mannonen; Lauri Vilkko; Olavi Rokka | Finland |

At the 1952 Summer Olympics in Helsinki, the men's team modern pentathlon event was contested. It was the first appearance of the event. The team event used (modified) scores from the individual event.

== Competition format ==
The modern pentathlon consisted of five events. The competition used a point-for-place system, with the lowest total across the five events winning. For the team competition, placing points in each of the five segments were adjusted to only account for full teams that finished that particular event. That is, when calculating placing points, individuals from countries that did not send full teams (1 each from Australia, Belgium, and South Africa) were ignored entirely. Places for members of the team from Germany (which had one individual not finish the shooting, swimming, and running events) were counted for the riding and fencing events but ignored for the shooting, swimming, and running events.

- Riding: a show jumping competition. The course was 5000 m long, with a time limit of 10 minutes, 32 seconds. Riders started with 100 points and could lose points either through obstacle faults or going over the time limit. Negative scores were possible. Ties were broken by the specific time taken, with the quicker rider winning.
- Fencing: a round-robin, one-touch épée competition. Score was based on number of bouts won, with double-touches used as a tie-breaker.
- Shooting: a rapid fire pistol competition, with 20 shots (each scoring up to 10 points) per competitor.
- Swimming: a 300 m freestyle swimming competition.
- Running: a 4 km race.

== Results ==
| Rank | Nation | Athletes | Riding | | Fencing | | Shooting | | Swimming | | Running | | Total | |
| Rank | Nation | Athletes | Orig. Place | Adj. Place | Orig. Place | Adj. Place | Orig. Place | Adj. Place | Orig. Place | Adj. Place | Orig. Place | Adj. Place | Orig. Points | Adj. Points |
|---|---|---|---|---|---|---|---|---|---|---|---|---|---|---|
| 1st place, gold medalist(s) | Hungary | Gábor Benedek | 8 | 8 | 2 | 2 | 9 | 9 | 18 | 16 | 2 | 2 | 39 | 37 |
| 1st place, gold medalist(s) | Hungary | István Szondy | 3 | 3 | 4 | 4 | 12 | 12 | 5 | 5 | 17 | 16 | 41 | 40 |
| 1st place, gold medalist(s) | Hungary | Aladár Kovácsi | 10 | 10 | 10 | 10 | 25 | 24 | 27 | 25 | 21 | 20 | 93 | 89 |
| 1st place, gold medalist(s) | Hungary | Total | 21 | 21 | 16 | 16 | 46 | 45 | 50 | 46 | 40 | 38 | 173 | 166 |
| 2nd place, silver medalist(s) | Sweden | Lars Hall | 1 | 1 | 7 | 7 | 15 | 15 | 1 | 1 | 8 | 8 | 32 | 32 |
| 2nd place, silver medalist(s) | Sweden | Thorsten Lindqvist | 4 | 4 | 6 | 6 | 42 | 40 | 7 | 7 | 16 | 15 | 75 | 72 |
| 2nd place, silver medalist(s) | Sweden | Claes Egnell | 14 | 13 | 3 | 3 | 13 | 13 | 23 | 21 | 29 | 28 | 82 | 78 |
| 2nd place, silver medalist(s) | Sweden | Total | 19 | 18 | 16 | 16 | 70 | 68 | 31 | 29 | 53 | 51 | 189 | 182 |
| 3rd place, bronze medalist(s) | Finland | Ole Mannonen | 2 | 2 | 37 | 35 | 10 | 10 | 9 | 9 | 4 | 4 | 62 | 60 |
| 3rd place, bronze medalist(s) | Finland | Lauri Vilkko | 11 | 11 | 38 | 36 | 1 | 1 | 8 | 8 | 5 | 5 | 63 | 61 |
| 3rd place, bronze medalist(s) | Finland | Olavi Rokka | 26 | 25 | 19 | 19 | 19 | 19 | 11 | 10 | 20 | 19 | 95 | 92 |
| 3rd place, bronze medalist(s) | Finland | Total | 39 | 38 | 94 | 90 | 30 | 30 | 28 | 27 | 29 | 28 | 220 | 213 |
| 4 | United States | Frederick Denman | 9 | 9 | 11 | 11 | 6 | 6 | 17 | 15 | 19 | 18 | 62 | 59 |
| 4 | United States | Thad McArthur | 12 | 12 | 23 | 22 | 29 | 27 | 3 | 3 | 1 | 1 | 68 | 65 |
| 4 | United States | Guy Troy | 6 | 6 | 17 | 17 | 8 | 8 | 34 | 31 | 30 | 29 | 95 | 91 |
| 4 | United States | Total | 27 | 27 | 51 | 50 | 43 | 41 | 54 | 49 | 50 | 48 | 225 | 215 |
| 5 | Soviet Union | Igor Novikov | 24 | 23 | 13 | 13 | 4 | 4 | 4 | 4 | 10 | 10 | 55 | 54 |
| 5 | Soviet Union | Pavel Rakityansky | 19 | 18 | 28 | 27 | 34 | 32 | 29 | 27 | 13 | 13 | 123 | 117 |
| 5 | Soviet Union | Aleksandr Dekhayev | 36 | 35 | 30 | 29 | 50 | 45 | 6 | 6 | 7 | 7 | 129 | 122 |
| 5 | Soviet Union | Total | 79 | 76 | 71 | 69 | 88 | 81 | 39 | 37 | 30 | 30 | 307 | 293 |
| 6 | Brazil | Eduardo de Medeiros | 23 | 22 | 24 | 23 | 5 | 5 | 2 | 2 | 26 | 25 | 80 | 77 |
| 6 | Brazil | Aloysio Borges | 30 | 29 | 1 | 1 | 39 | 37 | 21 | 19 | 22 | 21 | 113 | 107 |
| 6 | Brazil | Eric Marques | 44 | 43 | 18 | 18 | 30 | 28 | 15 | 13 | 28 | 27 | 135 | 129 |
| 6 | Brazil | Total | 97 | 94 | 43 | 42 | 74 | 70 | 38 | 34 | 76 | 73 | 328 | 313 |
| 7 | Chile | Nilo Floody | 20 | 19 | 9 | 9 | 17 | 17 | 33 | 30 | 27 | 26 | 106 | 101 |
| 7 | Chile | Hernán Fuentes | 35 | 34 | 22 | 21 | 3 | 3 | 25 | 23 | 35 | 33 | 120 | 114 |
| 7 | Chile | Luis Carmona | 25 | 24 | 12 | 12 | 28 | 26 | 40 | 37 | 23 | 22 | 128 | 121 |
| 7 | Chile | Total | 80 | 77 | 43 | 42 | 48 | 46 | 98 | 90 | 85 | 81 | 354 | 336 |
| 8 | Argentina | Luis Ribera | 5 | 5 | 31 | 30 | 33 | 31 | 13 | 11 | 18 | 17 | 100 | 94 |
| 8 | Argentina | Carlos Velázquez | 17 | 16 | 33 | 31 | 7 | 7 | 41 | 38 | 25 | 24 | 123 | 116 |
| 8 | Argentina | Jorge Cáceres | 33 | 32 | 39 | 37 | 14 | 14 | 28 | 26 | 38 | 36 | 152 | 145 |
| 8 | Argentina | Total | 55 | 53 | 103 | 98 | 54 | 52 | 82 | 75 | 81 | 77 | 375 | 355 |
| 9 | Switzerland | Werner Vetterli | 18 | 17 | 27 | 26 | 24 | 23 | 14 | 12 | 24 | 23 | 107 | 101 |
| 9 | Switzerland | Werner Schmid | 14 | 13 | 15 | 15 | 11 | 11 | 39 | 36 | 31 | 30 | 110 | 105 |
| 9 | Switzerland | Erhard Minder | 49 | 47 | 29 | 28 | 32 | 30 | 42 | 39 | 6 | 6 | 158 | 150 |
| 9 | Switzerland | Total | 81 | 77 | 71 | 69 | 67 | 64 | 95 | 87 | 61 | 59 | 375 | 356 |
| 10 | Great Britain | Leon Lumsdaine | 7 | 7 | 14 | 14 | 23 | 22 | 16 | 14 | 36 | 34 | 96 | 91 |
| 10 | Great Britain | John Hewitt | 27 | 26 | 42 | 40 | 18 | 18 | 37 | 34 | 12 | 12 | 136 | 130 |
| 10 | Great Britain | Jervis Percy | 40 | 39 | 50 | 47 | 36 | 34 | 32 | 29 | 3 | 3 | 161 | 152 |
| 10 | Great Britain | Total | 74 | 72 | 106 | 101 | 77 | 74 | 85 | 77 | 51 | 49 | 393 | 373 |
| 11 | Italy | Alfonso Marotta | 16 | 15 | 36 | 34 | 20 | 20 | 22 | 20 | 43 | 40 | 137 | 129 |
| 11 | Italy | Duilio Brignetti | 32 | 31 | 40 | 38 | 22 | 21 | 20 | 18 | 37 | 35 | 151 | 143 |
| 11 | Italy | Giulio Palmonella | 47 | 45 | 21 | 20 | 27 | 25 | 36 | 33 | 33 | 32 | 164 | 155 |
| 11 | Italy | Total | 95 | 91 | 97 | 92 | 69 | 66 | 78 | 71 | 113 | 107 | 452 | 427 |
| 12 | France | André Lacroix | 37 | 36 | 8 | 8 | 16 | 16 | 38 | 35 | 11 | 11 | 110 | 106 |
| 12 | France | Bertrand de Montaudoin | 46 | 44 | 35 | 33 | 40 | 38 | 46 | 42 | 9 | 9 | 176 | 166 |
| 12 | France | Christian Palant | 28 | 27 | 41 | 39 | 38 | 36 | 24 | 22 | 50 | 45 | 181 | 169 |
| 12 | France | Total | 111 | 107 | 84 | 80 | 94 | 90 | 108 | 99 | 70 | 65 | 467 | 441 |
| 13 | Uruguay | Alberto Ortíz | 22 | 21 | 44 | 42 | 2 | 2 | 43 | 40 | 15 | 14 | 126 | 119 |
| 13 | Uruguay | Lem Martínez | 39 | 38 | 25 | 24 | 47 | 43 | 35 | 32 | 41 | 38 | 187 | 175 |
| 13 | Uruguay | Américo González | 43 | 42 | 51 | 48 | 41 | 39 | 45 | 41 | 32 | 31 | 212 | 201 |
| 13 | Uruguay | Total | 104 | 101 | 120 | 114 | 90 | 84 | 123 | 113 | 88 | 83 | 525 | 495 |
| 14 | Mexico | José Pérez | 34 | 33 | 34 | 32 | 37 | 35 | 19 | 17 | 39 | 37 | 163 | 154 |
| 14 | Mexico | Antonio Almada | 29 | 28 | 43 | 41 | 49 | 44 | 30 | 28 | 42 | 39 | 193 | 180 |
| 14 | Mexico | David Romero | 38 | 37 | 49 | 46 | 45 | 42 | 26 | 24 | 44 | 41 | 202 | 190 |
| 14 | Mexico | Total | 101 | 98 | 126 | 119 | 131 | 121 | 75 | 69 | 125 | 117 | 558 | 524 |
| 15 | Portugal | Ricardo Durão | 31 | 30 | 16 | 16 | 35 | 33 | 48 | 44 | 49 | 44 | 179 | 167 |
| 15 | Portugal | José Pereira | 21 | 20 | 48 | 45 | 31 | 29 | 49 | 45 | 48 | 43 | 197 | 182 |
| 15 | Portugal | António Janet | 48 | 46 | 26 | 25 | 43 | 41 | 47 | 43 | 46 | 42 | 210 | 197 |
| 15 | Portugal | Total | 100 | 96 | 90 | 86 | 109 | 103 | 144 | 132 | 143 | 129 | 586 | 546 |
| – | Germany | Berthold Slupik | 41 | 40 | 5 | 5 | 26 | – | 31 | – | 45 | – | 148 | – |
| – | Germany | Dietloff Kapp | 42 | 41 | 46 | 43 | 44 | – | 12 | – | 14 | – | 158 | – |
| – | Germany | Adolf Harder | 49 | 47 | 47 | 44 | Did not finish | | | | | | | |
| – | Germany | Total | 132 | 128 | 98 | 92 | Did not finish | | | | | | | |
