= Modern pentathlon at the 1952 Summer Olympics – Men's =

Men's modern pentathlon at the Games of the XV Olympiad
- Venue: Hämeenlinna
- Dates: July 21–25
- Competitors: 51 from 19 nations

Medalists
1st place, gold medalist(s)		Lars Hall	Sweden
2nd place, silver medalist(s)		Gábor Benedek	Hungary
3rd place, bronze medalist(s)		István Szondy	Hungary

At the 1952 Summer Olympics in Helsinki, the men's individual modern pentathlon event was contested. It was the eighth appearance of the event, which had been featured at every Summer Olympics since 1912. The individual scores were also used for the men's team event.

== Competition format ==
The modern pentathlon consisted of five events. The competition used a point-for-place system, with the lowest total across the five events winning.

- Riding: a show jumping competition. The course was 5000 m long, with a time limit of 10 minutes, 32 seconds. Riders started with 100 points and could lose points either through obstacle faults or going over the time limit. Negative scores were possible. Ties were broken by the specific time taken, with the quicker rider winning.
- Fencing: a round-robin, one-touch épée competition. Score was based on number of bouts won, with double-touches used as a tie-breaker.
- Shooting: a rapid fire pistol competition, with 20 shots (each scoring up to 10 points) per competitor.
- Swimming: a 300 m freestyle swimming competition.
- Running: a 4 km race.

== Results ==
Rank	Athlete	Nation	Riding					Fencing			Shooting			Swimming		Running		Total
Rank	Athlete	Nation	Time	T faults	O faults	Score	Place	Wins	Double touches	Place	Hits	Score	Place	Time	Place	Time	Place	Total
1st place, gold medalist(s)	Lars Hall	Sweden	9.03.0	0	0	100	1	28	8	7	20	182	15	4.05.4	1	15.08.4	8	32
2nd place, silver medalist(s)	Gábor Benedek	Hungary	9.47.6	0	0	100	8	30	8	2	20	185	9	4.39.7	18	14.40.9	2	39
3rd place, bronze medalist(s)	István Szondy	Hungary	9.24.9	0	0	100	3	30	4	4	20	183	12	4.19.9	5	15.44.9	17	41
4	Igor Novikov	Soviet Union	10.41.0	4.5	0	95.5	24	25	8	13	20	187	4	4.16.9	4	15.11.6	10	55
5	Ole Mannonen	Finland	9.24.0	0	0	100	2	19	3	37	20	184	10	4.29.0	9	14.44.7	4	62
6	Frederick Denman	United States	9.51.3	0	0	100	9	28	5	11	20	186	6	4.36.9	17	15.53.5	19	62
7	Lauri Vilkko	Finland	10.08.1	0	0	100	11	18	10	38	20	196	1	4.27.6	8	14.45.9	5	63
8	Thad McArthur	United States	10.09.8	0	0	100	12	23	6	23	20	175	29	4.13.6	3	14.20.4	1	68
9	Thorsten Lindqvist	Sweden	9.30.8	0	0	100	4	29	4	6	18	165	42	4.25.5	7	15.42.0	16	75
10	Eduardo de Medeiros	Brazil	10.39.8	4	0	96	23	22	9	24	20	187	5	4.11.5	2	16.02.5	26	80
11	Claes Egnell	Sweden	10.18.6	0	0	100	14	30	7	3	20	183	13	4.54.3	23	16.04.9	29	82
12	Aladár Kovácsi	Hungary	10.01.1	0	0	100	10	28	5	10	20	179	25	5.01.4	27	15.54.2	21	93
13	Olavi Rokka	Finland	9.54.2	0	8	92	26	24	10	19	20	181	19	4.31.8	11	15.53.8	20	95
14	Guy Troy	United States	9.34.3	0	0	100	6	25	2	17	20	185	8	5.10.9	34	16.19.1	30	95
15	Leon Lumsdaine	Great Britain	9.44.0	0	0	100	7	25	5	14	20	180	23	4.36.4	16	16.30.4	36	96
16	Luis Ribera	Argentina	9.33.5	0	0	100	5	20	6	31	19	176	33	4.32.6	13	15.49.7	18	100
17	Nilo Floody	Chile	10.37.4	3	0	97	20	28	6	9	20	181	17	5.10.0	33	16.03.0	27	106
18	Werner Vetterli	Switzerland	10.11.6	0	3	97	18	22	3	27	20	180	24	4.33.5	14	15.59.7	24	107
19	André Lacroix	France	11.52.6	40.5	0	59.5	37	28	7	8	20	181	16	5.27.7	38	15.14.4	11	110
20	Werner Schmid	Switzerland	10.18.6	0	0	100	14	25	5	15	20	184	11	5.29.0	39	16.19.3	31	110
21	Aloysio Borges	Brazil	10.59.0	13.5	3	83.5	30	34	2	1	19	165	39	4.44.2	21	15.54.5	22	113
22	Hernán Fuentes	Chile	11.44.4	36.5	0	63.5	35	23	7	22	20	188	3	4.58.1	25	16.26.9	35	120
23	Pavel Rakityansky	Soviet Union	10.13.5	0	3	97	19	21	9	28	19	173	34	5.04.6	29	15.15.4	13	123
24	Carlos Velázquez	Argentina	9.32.6	0	3	97	17	20	2	33	20	186	7	5.35.7	41	16.01.2	25	123
25	Forbes Carlile	Australia	10.14.2	0	0	100	13	16	6	45	20	180	21	4.31.0	10	16.25.2	34	123
26	Alberto Ortíz	Uruguay	10.32.6	0.5	3	96.5	22	16	8	44	20	190	2	5.51.4	43	15.35.8	15	126
27	Luis Carmona	Chile	10.39.5	4	3	93	25	25	9	12	20	176	28	5.34.2	40	15.59.4	23	128
28	Aleksandr Dekhayev	Soviet Union	11.27.2	28	9	63	36	20	11	30	13	121	50	4.23.7	6	15.06.3	7	129
29	Eric Marques	Brazil	12.38.3	63.5	8	28.5	44	25	0	18	20	173	30	4.35.6	15	16.03.7	28	135
30	John Hewitt	Great Britain	10.54.7	11.5	0	88.5	27	17	6	42	20	181	18	5.22.9	37	15.15.3	12	136
31	Alfonso Marotta	Italy	10.19.5	0	0	100	16	19	6	36	20	181	20	4.52.7	22	17.21.8	43	137
32	Berthold Slupik	Germany	12.15.1	52	3	45	41	29	6	5	20	179	26	5.07.4	31	17.25.4	45	148
33	Duilio Brignetti	Italy	11.07.5	18	0	82	32	18	5	40	20	180	22	4.41.5	20	16.53.4	37	151
34	Jorge Cáceres	Argentina	10.56.6	12.5	9	78.5	33	18	8	39	20	182	14	5.02.5	28	16.59.7	38	152
35	Erhard Minder	Switzerland	Interrupted				49	21	4	29	19	181	32	5.36.9	42	15.04.1	6	158
36	Dietloff Kapp	Germany	12.03.7	46	11	43	42	15	9	46	18	159	44	4.32.2	12	15.31.4	14	158
37	Jervis Percy	Great Britain	10.35.3	2	50	48	40	13	8	50	19	171	36	5.08.5	32	14.41.9	3	161
38	José Pérez	Mexico	11.18.0	23	0	77	34	19	8	34	19	167	37	4.39.9	19	17.00.7	39	163
39	Giulio Palmonella	Italy	14.30.8	119.5	170	-189.5	47	24	5	21	20	177	27	5.22.3	36	16.21.3	33	164
40	Bertrand de Montaudoin	France	13.33.9	91	20	-11	46	19	7	35	19	164	40	6.11.0	46	15.09.7	9	176
41	Ricardo Durão	Portugal	10.59.1	14	3	83	31	25	3	16	19	173	35	7.07.7	48	18.04.5	49	179
42	Christian Palant	France	10.55.7	12	0	88	28	17	9	41	19	166	38	4.57.9	24	18.26.2	50	181
43	Lem Martínez	Uruguay	11.49.7	39	8	53	39	22	3	25	18	136	47	5.18.8	35	17.10.8	41	187
44	Antonio Almada	Mexico	10.58.3	13.5	3	83.5	29	16	10	43	15	142	49	5.06.7	30	17.15.7	42	193
45	Francis Plumerel	Belgium	12.39.0	63.5	14	22.5	45	24	8	20	18	145	46	5.55.5	44	17.09.5	40	195
46	José Pereira	Portugal	10.37.7	3	0	97	21	14	8	48	20	170	31	7.26.2	49	18.04.2	48	197
47	David Romero	Mexico	11.57.2	43	3	54	38	14	4	49	18	158	45	5.00.4	26	17.22.6	44	202
48	António Janet	Portugal	15.13.1	141	206	-247	48	22	3	26	18	160	43	6.16.3	47	17.46.8	46	210
49	Américo González	Uruguay	12.10.1	49.5	15	35.5	43	9	7	51	19	164	41	6.04.7	45	16.20.8	32	212
50	Harry Schmidt	South Africa	Interrupted				49	20	9	32	17	135	48	*	50	17.59.3	47	226
–	Adolf Harder	Germany	10.44.7	6.5	DQ	DQ	49	15	9	47	Did not finish							
