= Deaths in May 1995 =

The following is a list of notable deaths in May 1995.

Entries for each day are listed alphabetically by surname. A typical entry lists information in the following sequence:

- Name, age, country of citizenship at birth, subsequent country of citizenship (if applicable), reason for notability, cause of death (if known), and reference.

== May 1995 ==
=== 1 ===
- Erwin Leonard Guy Abel, 83, New Zealand businessman.
- Reuel Denney, 82, American poet and academic.
- Alan Fuller, 82, Australian rules footballer.
- Carl S. Herz, 65, American-Canadian mathematician.
- George MacKinnon, 89, American politician, attorney, and judge.
- Mikhail Zimyanin, 80, Soviet/Russian politician and diplomat.

=== 2 ===
- Luciano Anceschi, 84, Italian literary critic and essayist.
- Edwin Blum, 88, American screenwriter.
- Albert Bousser, 89, Luxembourgish politician, railway inspector, and trade unionist.
- Don Brockett, 65, American actor (Mister Rogers' Neighborhood, Flashdance, The Silence of the Lambs), heart attack.
- John Bunting, 76, Australian public servant and diplomat.
- Kiplyn Davis, 15, American high school student.
- Sir Michael Hordern, 83, English actor (The Dock Brief, Barry Lyndon, Watership Down), kidney disease.
- Allan O. Hunter, 78, American politician, member of the United States House of Representatives (1951-1955).
- Manfred Kersch, 81, German athlete.
- Dušan Mavec, 47, Slovenian Olympic equestrian (1984).
- Rudolf Perešin, 37, Croatian fighter pilot, killed in action.
- Ashleigh Pilbrow, 82, English hurdler and Olympian (1936).
- Dežo Ursiny, 47, Slovak rock musician, screenwriter and director.
- Werner Veigel, 66, Dutch-German journalist and news presenter (Tagesschau), brain cancer.
- Keith Zettlemoyer, 39, American convicted murderer, execution by lethal injection.

=== 3 ===
- John Warren Aldrich, 89, American ornithologist.
- Johnny Leonard, 91, Australian rules football player and coach.
- Adele Marcus, 89, American pianist and music educator.
- Jim Redstone, 79, Australian rules footballer.
- Adolf Schlyßleder, 85, German film editor and assistant director.
- Bruno Torpigliani, 80, Italian prelate of the Catholic Church.

=== 4 ===
- Andrey Abramov, 58, Soviet/Russian boxer and Olympian (1960).
- Arne Arnardo, 82, Norwegian circus performer and owner.
- Murray Barr, 86, Canadian physician and medical researcher.
- Cornelio Fabro, 83, Italian Catholic priest.
- Thomas Anthony Harris, 85, American psychiatrist and author, heart attack.
- Louis Krasner, 91, Ukrainian-American violinist.
- Hitomi Nozoe, 58, Japanese actress popular in the 1950s and early 1960s, cancer.
- Lewis Thompson Preston, 68, American banker, CEO of J.P. Morgan & Co. and president of the World Bank.
- Connie Wisniewski, 73, American baseball player, cancer.

=== 5 ===
- Josef Bek, 76, Czech film and television actor.
- Mikhail Botvinnik, 83, Russian chess player, pancreatic cancer.
- David Connell, 63-64, American television producer (Sesame Street, The Electric Company).
- Geno DeNobile, 62, Canadian football player.
- Earl Faircloth, 74, American politician and lawyer.
- Richard D. McCarthy, 67, American politician, member of the United States House of Representatives (1965-1971).
- Keith McPhee, 80, Australian rules footballer.
- Nagabhushanam, 73, Indian actor and comedian.
- Alastair Pilkington, 75, British engineer and businessman.
- Ye Qianyu, 88, Chinese painter and pioneering manhua artist.
- Edward W. Snedeker, 92, United States Marine Corps lieutenant general.
- Anthony Wagner, 86, English Officer of Arms at the College of Arms.
- Gerrit van Wees, 82, Dutch Olympic cyclist (1936).

=== 6 ===
- John Black Aird, 72, Canadian lawyer, corporate director and political figure.
- Maria Pia de Saxe-Coburgo e Bragança, 88, Portuguese writer and journalist.
- Noel Brotherston, 38, Northern Irish footballer, heart attack.
- Bucky Calabrese, 67, American upright bassist.
- Ippolito Gonzalez, 40, American police sergeant.
- Gottfried Haberler, 94, Austrian-American economist.
- Adriano Mantelli, 82, Italian aircraft designer.
- Georgios Mavros, 86, Greek jurist and politician.
- Clarence Paul, 67, American songwriter, record producer and singer, diabetes.

=== 7 ===
- Katharine Banham, 97, English psychologist who specialized in developmental psychology.
- Gus Bell, 66, American Major League Baseball player (Pittsburgh Pirates, Cincinnati Reds, New York Mets, Milwaukee Braves).
- María Luisa Bemberg, 73, Argentine film writer, director and actress, cancer.
- Ray Buckton, 72, British trade unionist.
- Clifford Clogg, 45, American sociologist, demographer, and statistician.
- Ernest H. Martin, 75, American Broadway and film producer of musicals.
- Ray McKinley, 84, American jazz drummer, singer, and bandleader.
- Giti Pashaei, 54, Iranian singer and musician, breast cancer.
- Mariya Polyakova, 87, Soviet colonel and spy.
- Ioannis Toumbas, 94, Greek naval officer and politician.
- Helen Varcoe, 88, English swimmer and Olympic medalist.

=== 8 ===
- Carroll Best, American banjo player.
- Prem Bhatia, 72, Indian diplomat and journalist.
- Knut Gadd, 78, Swedish Olympic water polo player (1948).
- Jacques Isorni, 83, French lawyer and memoirist.
- Marshal Royal, 82, American alto saxophonist and clarinetist, brother of Ernie Royal.
- Bill Spivey, 66, American basketball player (Kentucky Wildcats).
- Teresa Teng, 42, Taiwanese singer, asthma.

=== 9 ===
- Jeanne Darville, 70, Danish film actress.
- Alf Henrikson, 89, Swedish author, poet and translator.
- Marguerite Jones, 77, Canadian baseball player.
- Percy Mansell, 75, South African cricket player.
- Charles Monteith, 74, British literary editor.
- Kanhiyalal Prabhakar Mishra, 88, Indian journalist, writer and freedom fighter.
- Nils Nicklén, 78, Finnish high jumper and Olympian (1948).
- John Elwood Price, 59, American composer, pianist, ethnomusicologist, and music teacher.
- Earl H. Pritchard, 87, American scholar of China.
- Magda Rurac, 76, Romanian tennis player in the 1940s and 1950s.
- Peter Townsend, 85, English cricketer.

=== 10 ===
- Brigitte Alexander, 83, German-born Mexican author, actress, director and translator.
- Wal Armour, 74, Australian rules footballer.
- Harold Berens, 92, British comedian and character actor.
- Georgios Candilis, 82, Greek-French architect and urbanist.
- Ilio DiPaolo, 68, Italian professional wrestler and restaurateur.
- Karl Drewo, 65, Austrian jazz saxophonist.
- Ernst Eggerbauer, 63, German Olympic ice hockey player (1960).
- Alexander Elbrächter, 87, German politician and member of the Bundestag.
- Freddy Fernández, 61, Mexican film and television actor, esophageal cancer.
- Johnny Leonard, 91, Australian rules footballer and coach.
- Duncan McKenzie, 43, American convicted murderer, execution by lethal injection.
- Juan Manuel López Mella, 30, Spanish motorcycle racer, traffic collision.
- Jimmy Raney, 67, American jazz guitarist.
- Carlos Rinaldi, 80, Argentine film director, film editor and screenwriter.
- Steffie Spira, 86, Austrian-German actress.
- Gil Steinke, 76, American football player (Philadelphia Eagles), and coach.
- Joe Vetrano, 76, American gridiron football player (San Francisco 49ers).
- Dicky Zulkarnaen, 55, Indonesian actor.

=== 11 ===
- Reza Abdoh, 32, Iranian playwright and director, AIDS.
- David Avidan, 61, Israeli poet and playwright.
- José T. Joya, 63, Filipino abstract artist.
- Arthur Lubin, 96, American film director.
- Boris Pash, 94, United States Army military intelligence officer.
- John Phillips, 80, British actor.
- Ivo Samkalden, 82, Dutch politician and jurist.
- Bill Shelton, 92, Australian rules football player.
- Pete Tinsley, 82, American gridiron football player (Green Bay Packers).

=== 12 ===
- Len Beadell, 72, Australian surveyor, road builder, bushman, artist and author.
- Giorgio Belladonna, 71, Italian bridge player.
- John Blight, 81, Australian poet.
- Andrei Boltnev, 49, Soviet/Russian actor, stroke.
- Arnold Goodman, Baron Goodman, 81, British lawyer and political advisor.
- Bogo Grafenauer, 79, Slovenian historian.
- Ștefan Kovács, 74, Romanian football player and coach.
- Vernon L. Lowrance, 86, United States Navy vice admiral.
- Mia Martini, 47, Italian singer and songwriter, heart failure.
- Adolfo Pedernera, 76, Argentinian footballer.
- Maria Teresa Riedl, 57, Italian tennis player.
- Marcel Rubin, 89, Austrian composer and music critic.
- Karl Vennberg, 85, Swedish poet, writer and translator.

=== 13 ===
- Francisco Moreno Capdevila, 69, Spanish-Mexican artist.
- Robert Lattermann, 64, Austrian Olympic equestrian (1956).
- Alan Maley, 64, British visual effects artist (Raiders of the Lost Ark, Bedknobs and Broomsticks, The Spy Who Loved Me), Oscar winner (1972), heart attack.
- Robert Marley, 85, Jamaican cricket player.
- Teddy Sandford, 84, English football player.
- Hao Wang, 73, Chinese-American logician, philosopher, and mathematician.

=== 14 ===
- Christian B. Anfinsen, 79, American biochemist and Nobel Prize for Chemistry laureate, heart attack.
- Rodrigo Arenas Betancourt, 75, Colombian sculptor, liver cancer.
- Jessy Blackburn, 101, British aviation pioneer.
- Mary Brazier, 90, American neuroscientist.
- Ted James, 76, American politician.
- Jean Laurent, 88, French football player.
- Tommy Prothro, 74, American football coach, cancer.
- Hamilton Lavity Stoutt, 66, British Virgin Islander politician and first Chief Minister of the British Virgin Islands.
- Richard Udugama, 83, Sri Lankan military leader, politician and diplomat.

=== 15 ===
- Lionel Brodie, 77, Australian tennis player.
- Benjamin Bubar Jr., 77, American politician and ordained minister.
- Dora Chapman, 84, Australian painter.
- Robert De Waele, 61, Belgian Olympic canoeist (1960).
- Seymour Durst, 81, American real estate investor and developer.
- Norm Locking, 83, Canadian ice hockey player (Chicago Black Hawks).
- Billy Lott, 60, American gridiron football player (New York Giants, Oakland Raiders, Boston Patriots).
- Taizan Maezumi, 64, Japanese Zen Buddhist teacher and rōshi, drowned.
- Grace Matthews, 84, Canadian actress in the era of old-time radio and the early years of television.
- Gaston Mobati, 33, Congolese footballer.
- Fred G. Moritt, 89, American lawyer, singer, composer, lyricist and politician.
- Eric Porter, 67, English actor, colorectal cancer.
- Luis Antonio Ramírez, 72, Puerto Rican composer.
- Eugen Studach, 87, Swiss rower and Olympian (1936).
- Pia Tassinari, 91, Italian opera singer who was first a soprano and later a mezzo-soprano.

=== 16 ===
- Edris Allan, 86, Jamaican community worker, political figure and women's rights advocate.
- Red Amick, 66, American racecar driver.
- Harry E. Bergold Jr., 63, American diplomat and ambassador.
- Parelius Hjalmar Bang Berntsen, 85, Norwegian politician for the Labour Party.
- Ray Bower, 72, Australian rules footballer.
- Lola Flores, 72, Spanish singer, dancer and actress, breast cancer.
- Gertrude Grob-Prandl, 77, Austrian soprano.
- Ragnhild Hatton, 82, Norwegian-British professor of International History at the London School of Economics.
- Raymond Lyttleton, 84, British mathematician and theoretical astronomer.
- Thomas Lee Ward, 59, American convicted murderer, execution by lethal injection.
- Doug Woodward, 70, Canadian Olympic sailor (1952, 1964).

=== 17 ===
- Toe Blake, 82, Canadian ice hockey player and coach in the National Hockey League (Montreal Canadiens), Alzheimer's disease.
- Girvies Davis, 37, American serial killer, execution by lethal injection.
- Geoffrey Dickens, 63, British politician, liver cancer.
- Joe McKenney, 90, American football player and coach.
- Catfish Metkovich, 74, American baseball player.
- Leonid Ivanovich Volkov, 60, Soviet Russian ice hockey player and Olympian (1964).

=== 18 ===
- Brinsley Trench, 8th Earl of Clancarty, 83, Irish peer and proponent of the Hollow Earth concept.
- Elisha Cook Jr., 91, American actor (The Maltese Falcon, Rosemary's Baby, Shane), stroke.
- Francis Judd Cooke, 84, American composer, organist, cellist, pianist, conductor, and choir director.
- Alexander Godunov, 45, Russian ballet dancer and actor (Die Hard, Witness, The Money Pit), hepatitis.
- Robert Harris, 95, English actor.
- Jack Kramer, 77, American baseball player.
- Henri Laborit, 80, French surgeon, neurobiologist, writer and philosopher.
- Elizabeth Montgomery, 62, American actress (Bewitched, The Legend of Lizzie Borden, A Case of Rape), colorectal cancer.
- Åke Nauman, 87, Swedish Olympic water polo player (1936).
- Dorothy Poynton-Hill, 79, American Olympic diver (1928, 1932, 1936).
- Sabine Sinjen, 52, German film actress, cancer.
- Michael P. W. Stone, 69, British-American businessman and government administrator.
- Tor Ulven, 41, Norwegian poet, suicide.
- Peter van de Kamp, 93, Dutch astronomer.

=== 19 ===
- Bryce Cooper, 89, Australian cricketer.
- Robert Sinclair Dietz, 80, American geologist.
- Derek Ford, 62, English film director and writer.
- Fred Frink, 83, American baseball player (Philadelphia Phillies).
- Andrée Hoppilliard, 86, French aeronautical engineer.
- Hans Jürgen Kiebach, 64, German production designer, art director and set decorator.
- Trevor Lewis, 75, British Olympic water polo player (1948).
- Jacques Perreten, 68, Swiss Olympic ski jumper (1952).
- Robert Riger, 70, American sports illustrator, photographer, television director, and cinematographer.
- Nico van Gageldonk, 81, Dutch Olympic cyclist (1936).

=== 20 ===
- Maurice Banide, 90, French football player, manager, and Olympian (1928).
- Les Cowie, 70, Australian rugby player.
- Oscar Gjøslien, 85, Norwegian cross-country skier.
- Burton Jastram, 84, American rower and Olympian (1932).
- Ulysses Kay, 78, American composer, Parkinson's disease.
- Florijan Matekalo, 75, Yugoslav and Croatian football player.
- Les Smith, 77, English football player, Alzheimer's disease.

=== 21 ===
- Les Aspin, 56, American politician and member of the U.S. House of Representatives (1971-1993), stroke.
- Larry Hillblom, 52, American businessman and co-founder of DHL.
- Chaudhry Altaf Hussain, 65, Pakistani politician.
- Giuseppe Peruchetti, 87, Italian football player and coach.
- Edmunds Pīlāgs, 67, Soviet Latvian Olympic sprinter (1952).
- Agnelo Rossi, 82, Brazilian Cardinal of the Roman Catholic Church.
- Annie M. G. Schmidt, 84, Dutch writer, heart attack.
- Sylvester Snead, 80, American baseball player.
- Mükbile Sultan, 83, Ottoman princess and granddaughter of Mehmed V.

=== 22 ===
- Robert Flemyng, 83, British actor, pneumonia.
- Claude Itzykson, 57, French theoretical physicist.
- Abelardo Menéndez, 66, Cuban Olympic fencer (1952, 1960).
- Butch Morse, 84, American gridiron football player (Detroit Lions).
- Derek Reeves, 60, English football player.

=== 23 ===
- Pierre Baratin, 74, French cyclist.
- Tom Ellis, 91, Australian rugby league footballer.
- Ross Flood, 84, American wrestler and Olympian medalist (1936).
- Patricia Ford, 74, Northern Ireland Ulster Unionist Party politician.
- Dan Fortmann, 79, American Hall of Fame gridiron football player (Chicago Bears).
- Gavriil Kachalin, 84, Soviet/Russian football player and coach.
- Mick Pyne, 54, English jazz pianist.
- Torolv Solheim, 87, Norwegian resistance member during World War II, essayist, and politician.
- Harold Wilson, 79, Prime Minister of the United Kingdom, Alzheimer's disease and colorectal cancer.
- Ab Wright, 89, American baseball (Cleveland Indians, Boston Braves), and football player (Frankford Yellow Jackets).

=== 24 ===
- Ole Borge, 79, Norwegian jurist and resistance member during World War II.
- Paul J. Kramer, 91, American biologist and plant physiologist.
- Ichisada Miyazaki, 93, Japanese historian.
- Youakim Moubarac, 70, Lebanese Islamologist, Orientalist and Arabist.
- Haroldo da Silva, 65, Brazilian Olympic sprinter (1948).

=== 25 ===
- Jack Allen, 87, English film, theatre and television actor.
- Élie Bayol, 81, French racing driver.
- Veronica Bulshefski, 79, Director of the United States Navy Nurse Corps.
- Ted Calland, 62, English professional footballer.
- Boyden Carpenter, 86, American hillbilly and bluegrass artist.
- Krešimir Ćosić, 46, Croatian basketball player, coach, and Olympian (1968, 1972, 1976, 1980), non-Hodgkin's lymphoma.
- Dick Curless, 63, American country music singer, stomach cancer.
- Alice Day, 89, American film actress.
- Olavi Linnonmaa, 74, Finnish Olympic cyclist (1952).
- Frank Murphy, 90, Australian rules footballer.
- Karl Reiniger, 85, Swiss Olympic racewalker (1936).
- Dany Robin, 68, French actress, domestic fire.
- Frank Stahan, 78, Canadian ice hockey player (Montreal Canadiens).
- Samuel A. Tamposi, 70, American real estate developer, lymphoma.

=== 26 ===
- Tony Azito, 46, American dancer and actor (The Addams Family, Moonstruck, Union City), HIV/AIDS.
- David S. Breslow, 78, American industrial chemist best known for his work on polymers.
- Friz Freleng, 89, American animator (Looney Tunes).
- Edmund Hansen, 94, Danish Olympic track cyclist (1924).
- Vasile Maluțan, 53, Romanian military pilot, personal pilot of Nicolae Ceaușescu, helicopter crash.
- Kamukara Purushothaman, 64, Indian singer.
- Sigmund Skard, 91, Norwegian poet, essayist and professor of American literature.
- Mordechai Surkis, 87, Israeli politician.
- Eriprando Visconti, 62, Italian film director, screenwriter, and producer, pulmonary emphysema.

=== 27 ===
- Ștefan Bănică Sr., 61, Romanian actor.
- Severn Darden, 65, American comedian and actor (Conquest of the Planet of the Apes, Back to School, Saturday the 14th), heart failure.
- Epi Drost, 49, Dutch association football player and manager, heart attack.
- László Kalmár, 63, Hungarian composer and editor.
- Jakob Lyng, 88, Danish Olympic fencer (1948, 1952).
- Ralph MacSweyn, 52, Canadian ice hockey player (Philadelphia Flyers).
- Mike McQuay, 45, American science fiction writer, heart attack.
- Christopher B. "Stubb" Stubblefield, 64, American barbecue restaurateur.

=== 28 ===
- Roy Ankrah, 69, Ghanaian boxer who won the British Empire super featherweight title.
- Helen Ballard, 87, British horticulturist.
- Gunnar Huseby, 71, Icelandic track and field athlete.
- Henning Kronstam, 60, Danish ballet dancer, ballet master and company director.
- Ernie Lewis, 70, American gridiron football player.
- Irfan Ljubijankić, 42, Bosnian classical music composer, politician and diplomat, killed in action.
- Harold Logan, 89, Australian rules footballer.
- Jean Muir, 66, British fashion designer, breast cancer.
- Arifin C. Noer, 54, Indonesian poet, theater director and film producer, liver cancer.
- Daniela Rocca, 57, Italian actress, model and writer, heart attack.
- Sinedu Tadesse, 19, Ethiopian student, suicide.
- Tahsin Taha, 54, Kurdish singer.
- Cornelis Weber, 95, Dutch Olympic fencer (1936).
- Matthew E. Welsh, 82, American politician.

=== 29 ===
- Santiago Armada, 57, Cuban artist and designer.
- Juan Boria, 90, Puerto Rican poet.
- Ralph Gustafson, 85, Canadian poet and professor at Bishop's University.
- Mike Pentz, 70, South African-British physicist and activist in the peace movement, leukemia.
- Archibald Russell, 90, British aerospace engineer.
- Glen Selbo, 69, American basketball and baseball player.
- Margaret Chase Smith, 97, American politician, lung cancer.
- Kurt Weiß, 89, German Olympic field hockey player (1928, 1936).

=== 30 ===
- Robert Alexander Anderson, 100, American composer.
- Glenn Burke, 42, American Major League Baseball player who was the first to come out as gay (Los Angeles Dodgers, Oakland Athletics), AIDS complications.
- Ted Drake, 82, English footballer.
- Lofty England, 83, British engineer and motor company manager.
- Antonio Flores, 33, Spanish singer-songwriter and actor, drug overdose.
- William McVey, 89, American sculptor, animalier and teacher.
- Ray Novotny, 87, American football player and coach.
- Giuseppe Sartore, 58, Italian racing cyclist.
- Philip Sherrard, 72, British author, translator and philosopher.
- Bobby Stokes, 44, English footballer, pneumonia.
- Ștefana Velisar Teodoreanu, 97, Romanian novelist, poet and translator.
- Arthur M. Young, 89, American inventor, helicopter pioneer, cosmologist, philosopher, astrologer, and author.

=== 31 ===
- Roy Beddington, 85, British painter, illustrator, poet, writer on fishing, and journalist.
- Guillermo Bermúdez, 71, Colombian architect.
- Norm Brown, 76, American baseball player (Philadelphia Athletics).
- Stanley Elkin, 65, American novelist, short story writer, and essayist, heart attack.
- Emilio García Gómez, 89, Spanish Arabist, literary historian and critic.
- Robert Jouaville, 80, French Olympic wrestler (1948).
- Ruben Orozco, 78, Uruguayan Olympic pentathlete (1948).
- Ingrid Semmingsen, 85, Norwegian historian.
- Pavel Šivic, 87, Slovenian composer, concert pianist, and music educator.
- Warren Sonbert, 47, American experimental filmmaker, complications from AIDS

== Sources ==
- Liebman, Roy (2000). The Wampas Baby Stars: A Biographical Dictionary, 1922–1934. Jefferson, North Carolina: McFarland. ISBN 0-7864-0756-5.
