= Modern pentathlon at the 1948 Summer Olympics =

Men's modern pentathlon at the Games of the XIV Olympiad
- Venue: Aldershot Lido
- Dates: 30 July – 4 August 1948
- Competitors: 45 from 16 nations

Medalists
1st place, gold medalist(s)		William Grut	Sweden
2nd place, silver medalist(s)		George Moore	United States
3rd place, bronze medalist(s)		Gösta Gärdin	Sweden

At the 1948 Summer Olympics in London, a single modern pentathlon event was contested composed of five disciplines. Competitors were housed at the Royal Military Academy Sandhurst and the five disciplines were held at nearby venues. Whereas the symbol used for most sports in official materials was a relevant piece of sports equipment, for the modern pentathlon it was a laurel wreath.

== Competition format ==
The modern pentathlon consisted of five disciplines. The competition used a point-for-place system, with the lowest total across the five disciplines winning.

Discipline	Date	Venue	Format
Riding	30 July	Tweseldown Racecourse	Cross-country riding a 5,000 m course, with points lost for failing to clear obstacles and for exceeding a ten-minute time limit. Fifty British Army horses were imported from the British occupation zone in Germany.
Fencing	31 July	Central Gymnasium, Aldershot Military Headquarters	A round-robin, one-touch épée competition. Score was based on number of bouts won
Shooting	2 August	Bisley National Rifle Association Ranges	A rapid fire pistol competition, with 20 shots (each scoring up to 10 points) per competitor
Swimming	3 August	Aldershot Lido	Freestyle swimming 300 m in open-air 50m pool
Running	4 August	Royal Military Academy environs	Cross-country running a 4,000 m course

The medal ceremony was on 5 August in Wembley Stadium

== Participating nations ==
45 athletes from 16 nations competed at the London Games:

- Argentina (3)
- Belgium (3)
- Brazil (3)
- Chile (2)
- Czechoslovakia (2)
- Finland (3)
- France (3)
- Great Britain (3)
- Hungary (3)
- Italy (3)
- Mexico (2)
- Spain (3)
- Sweden (3)
- Switzerland (3)
- United States (3)
- Uruguay (3)

== Results ==
Rank	Athlete	Nation	Riding					Fencing		Shooting			Swimming		Running		Total
Rank	Athlete	Nation	Time	Time faults	Obstacle faults	Score	Place	Wins	Place	Hits	Score	Place	Time	Place	Time	Place	Total
1st place, gold medalist(s)	Willie Grut	Sweden	9:18.2	0	0	100	1	28	1	20	190	5	4:17	1	15:28.9	8	16
2nd place, silver medalist(s)	George Moore	United States	9:22.7	0	0	100	2	26	3	20	183	21	5:09.2	17	15:07.5	4	47
3rd place, bronze medalist(s)	Gösta Gärdin	Sweden	9:42.6	0	0	100	6	19	17	20	188	10	4:43.1	11	15:08.7	5	49
4	Lauri Vilkko	Finland	9:55.2	0	8	92	17	13	38	20	190	4	4:24.0	3	14:21.9	2	64
5	Olavi Larkas	Finland	10:31.7	16	3	81	26	26	3	20	190	7	5:11.7	19	15:48.7	16	71
6	Bruno Riem	Switzerland	10:16.1	8.5	0	91.5	19	22	9	20	194	1	6:24.2	36	15:34.9	9	74
7	Franz Hegner	Switzerland	9:46.4	0	0	100	7	24	6	20	181	24	4:53.4	13	16:32.5	29	79
8	Richard Gruenther	United States	10:25.0	12.5	0	87.5	24	20	13	20	183	13	4:45.2	12	16:04.7	19	81
9	Nilo Floody	Chile	9:54.9	0	3	97	11	23	7	20	183	20	5:31.0	30	15:55.0	17	85
10	Viktor Platan	Finland	9:32.2	0	0	100	4	16	28	17	141	44	4:38.9	7	14:24.6	3	86
11	Enrique Wirth	Argentina	9:54.9	0	0	100	9	19	17	20	177	29	5:22.2	25	15:46.6	13	93
12	Frigyes Hegedűs	Hungary	DQ	—	—	—	45	20	13	20	193	3	5:20.2	24	15:39.2	10	95
13	Hale Baugh	United States	9:52.0	0	3	97	0	22	9	20	178	28	4:41.0	9	18:25.4	40	96
14	André Lacroix	France	10:26.8	13.5	9	77.5	27	19	17	20	185	18	5:28.8	29	15:13.7	6	97
15	Giulio Palmonella	Italy	10:09.6	5	0	95	14	17	26	20	187	15	5:12.5	21	16:11.2	22	98
16	Louis Pichon	France	12:13.0	66.5	8	25.5	36	25	5	20	188	9	5:40.0	32	15:57.0	18	100
17	Sune Wehlin	Sweden	11:09.9	35	14	51	31	14	34	20	183	22	4:53.5	14	14:09.9	1	102
18	István Szondy	Hungary	10:59.0	29.5	0	70.5	28	6	44	20	188	11	4:21.1	2	16:10.7	20	105
19	Roberto Curcio	Italy	10:21.5	11	0	89	22	23	7	20	188	14	5:23.5	26	17:09.0	36	105
20	Andy Martin	Great Britain	10:07.3	4	0	96	12	15	31	20	182	23	5:33.4	31	15:40.7	11	108
21	Augusto Premoli	Argentina	9:42.3	0	0	100	5	21	11	19	169	35	5:41.8	33	16:23.1	25	109
22	Alberto Moreiras	Spain	10:23.5	12	0	88	23	15	31	20	183	19	4:29.0	5	16:58.9	34	112
23	José Luis Riera	Spain	10:03.3	2	6	92	18	18	24	17	149	42	4:25.7	4	16:27.4	26	114
24	Hernán Fuentes	Chile	16:13.2	187	312	-399	43	20	13	20	190	6	5:19.8	23	16:49.8	32	117
25	Duilio Brignetti	Italy	13:28.1	104.5	25	-29.5	38	14	34	20	183	12	4:33.0	6	16:32.2	28	118
26	Alberto Ortíz	Uruguay	10:13.0	6.5	3	90.5	20	11	41	20	186	17	5:43.9	34	15:22.5	7	119
27	Werner Schmid	Switzerland	14:57.4	149	103	-152	42	19	17	20	193	2	5:27.0	28	16:42.0	30	119
28	Christian Palant	France	13:16.0	98	61	-59	40	18	24	20	190	8	5:08.6	16	16:48.6	31	119
29	Karel Bártů	Czechoslovakia	11:35.3	48	0	52	30	13	38	20	179	27	4:58.5	15	15:47.8	14	124
30	Aëcio Coelho	Brazil	9:26.1	0	6	94	15	28	1	19	172	33	6:47.4	39	17:34.1	37	125
31	Carlos Mercader	Uruguay	9:44.4	0	8	92	16	16	28	19	171	34	5:56.8	35	15:44.0	12	125
32	Horacio Siburu	Argentina	10:03.9	2	3	95	13	16	28	20	177	30	5:10.4	18	17:39.0	38	127
33	Alejandro Quiroz	Mexico	11:18.3	39.5	0	60.5	29	15	31	20	186	16	5:26.2	27	16:31.7	27	130
34	Jack Lumsden	Great Britain	9:29.0	0	0	100	3	14	34	19	167	37	6:31.3	38	16:10.7	20	132
35	Ricardo García	Mexico	9:49.8	0	0	100	8	12	40	17	148	43	4:42.4	10	16:50.7	33	134
36	Manuel Bernabeu	Spain	14:00.0	121.5	106	-127.5	41	19	17	19	162	39	5:12.3	20	16:21.7	24	141
37	Geoffrey Brooke	Great Britain	13:42.8	111.5	32	-43.5	39	20	13	18	153	41	6:29.6	37	15:48.4	15	145
38	Aloysio Borges	Brazil	11:15.4	38	17	45	33	17	26	19	167	36	4:40.3	8	DQ	43	146
39	Otto Jemelka	Czechoslovakia	10:10.5	5.5	9	85.5	25	19	17	20	173	31	7:18.2	42	17:03.3	35	150
40	Louis Fauconnier	Belgium	11:35.2	48	6	46	32	19	17	20	179	26	7:11.1	41	18:03.3	39	155
41	Charles Vyt	Belgium	10:03.9	2	8	90	21	14	34	19	165	38	7:05.8	40	16:17.2	23	156
42	Ruben Orozco	Uruguay	12:09.6	65	6	29	35	11	41	20	181	25	5:15.8	22	19:49.9	41	164
43	Humberto Bedford	Brazil	12:33.4	77	8	15	37	8	43	18	166	40	7:27.7	43	19:51.7	42	205
44	Raoul Mollet	Belgium	11:42.7	51.5	8	40.5	34	DNS	—	DNS	—	—	DNS	—	DNS	—	—
45	László Karácson	Hungary	DQ	—	—	—	45	21	11	19	173	32	DNS	—	DNS	—	—

== Sources ==
- "The Official Report of the Organising Committee for the XIV Olympiad" (PDF). The Organising Committee for the XIV Olympiad. 1948. pp. 46–47, 54–55, 145–146, 413–416. Archived from the original (PDF) on 16 July 2011. [also last 8 pages of plates between pp. 320 and 321]
- Phillips, Bob (2007). The 1948 Olympics : how London rescued the games. Cheltenham: SportsBooks. pp. 230–235. ISBN 978-1-899807-54-3.
- Hampton, Janie (2008). The austerity Olympics : when the games came to London in 1948. London: Aurum. pp. 249–252. ISBN 978-1-84513-334-4.
