= Bertil Haase =

Swedish modern pentathlete

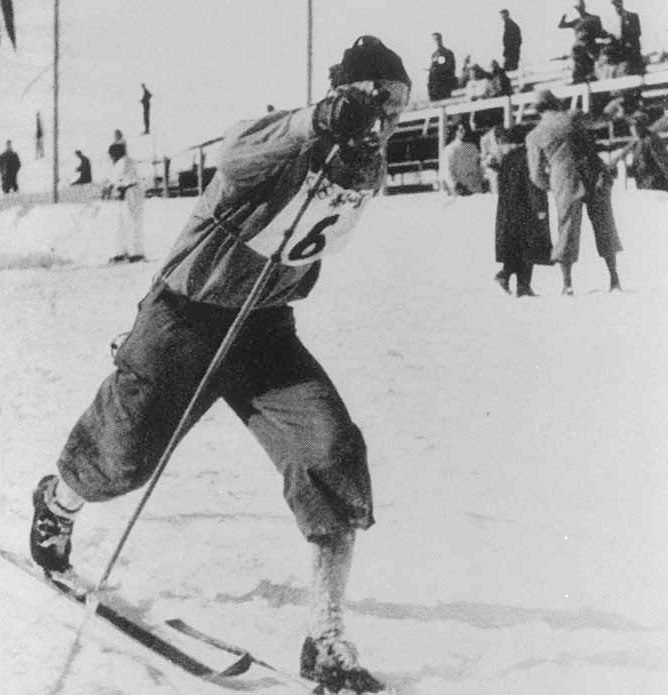
- Haase at the 1948 Olympics

Personal information
- Born: 5 June 1923 Uppsala, Sweden
- Died: 7 July 2014 (aged 91)

Sport
- Sport: Modern pentathlon, winter pentathlon
- Club: SSIF, Stockholm
Medal record
Representing Sweden
Olympic Games
Bronze medal – third place	1948 St. Moritz	Winter pentathlon, ind.
World championships
Gold medal – first place	1950 Bern	Modern pentathlon, team
Bronze medal – third place	1954 Budapest	Modern pentathlon, team

Bertil Robert Herman Haase Vidarsson (5 June 1923 – 7 July 2014) was a Swedish pentathlete who competed at both Winter and Summer Olympics.

Hasse joined the Swedish Army as a volunteer and attended military school as a furir (private first class). He later retired from the army as a kapten. Together with Claes Egnell, Willie Grut and Gustaf Lindh he competed in the 1948 Winter Olympics in the winter pentathlon, which was contested as a demonstration event. As an excellent skier, he won both the downhill and the 10 km cross country disciplines, but lagged behind in shooting, fencing and horse riding. He finished third overall and won the bronze medal. Fellow countrymen Lindh and Grut took the first and second place respectively.

Since the winter pentathlon would have no other appearances at the Olympic Games, Haase turned to the modern pentathlon. He was selected for the 1956 Summer Olympics and finished 17th individually. In the team contest Sweden was the favourite as it included Björn Thofelt and the individual Olympic champion Lars Hall. In the first event, horse riding, Thofelt had drawn the lot for a very peculiar horse and eventually suffered from a concussion, after he fell off twice and had to withdraw. Consequently, the Swedish team was not ranked.

Hasse was also successful at the world championships. He won the team title in 1950, with Lars Hall and Thor Henning, and placed third in 1954, with Åke Julin and Thofelt. Haase's home club was Studenternas Idrottsförening Stockholm. He completed an engineering study at the Royal Institute of Technology in Stockholm with a focus on metallurgical and then worked in the metallurgical industry in Fagersta, where he resided until his death in July 2014.
