= Hungarian National Pentathlon Championship 1946 =

Hungarian Pentathlon Championship
- Location: Budapest
- Start date: 3 October 1946
- End date: 6 October 1946
- Competitors: 16

Hungarian National Pentathlon Championship 1946 was the first case when a nationwide championship was held in Hungary to find the champion in pentathlon. Competitors were ranked by their results in all of the five competitions. László Karácson, the winner of the event became third in show jumping, fifth in épée fencing, first in pistol shooting, third in freestyle swimming and second in running. Only Csepel Sport Club was able to field a team, so they won the team championship.

== Results ==
=== Men ===
==== Single ====
Position	Name	Club	Result
1.	László Karácson	Csepeli MTK	19.0
2.	Ferenc Ádám	MPSC	20.5
3.	Dénes Csáthy	Csepeli MTK	21.5
4.	Ferenc Benedek	Csepeli MTK	22.0
5.	István Szondy	Ceglédi Vasutas SE	24.0
6.	Sándor Rátonyi	KAOE	34.0
7.	Cézár Pieri	Csepeli MTK	36.5
8.	István Hegedűs	TFSE	39.0
9.	György Szilvássy	MTK	42.0
10.	Lajos Makarész	Csepeli MTK	47.0

==== Team ====
Position	Name	Club	Result
1.	László Karácson, Dénes Csáthy, Ferenc Ferenc	Csepeli MTK	62.5

== Sources ==
- "Felnőtt öttusa országos bajnokságok Férfiak". pentathlon.hu. Archived from the original on 2012-04-30.
