= Gustaf Lindh =

Swedish modern pentathlete (1926–2015)

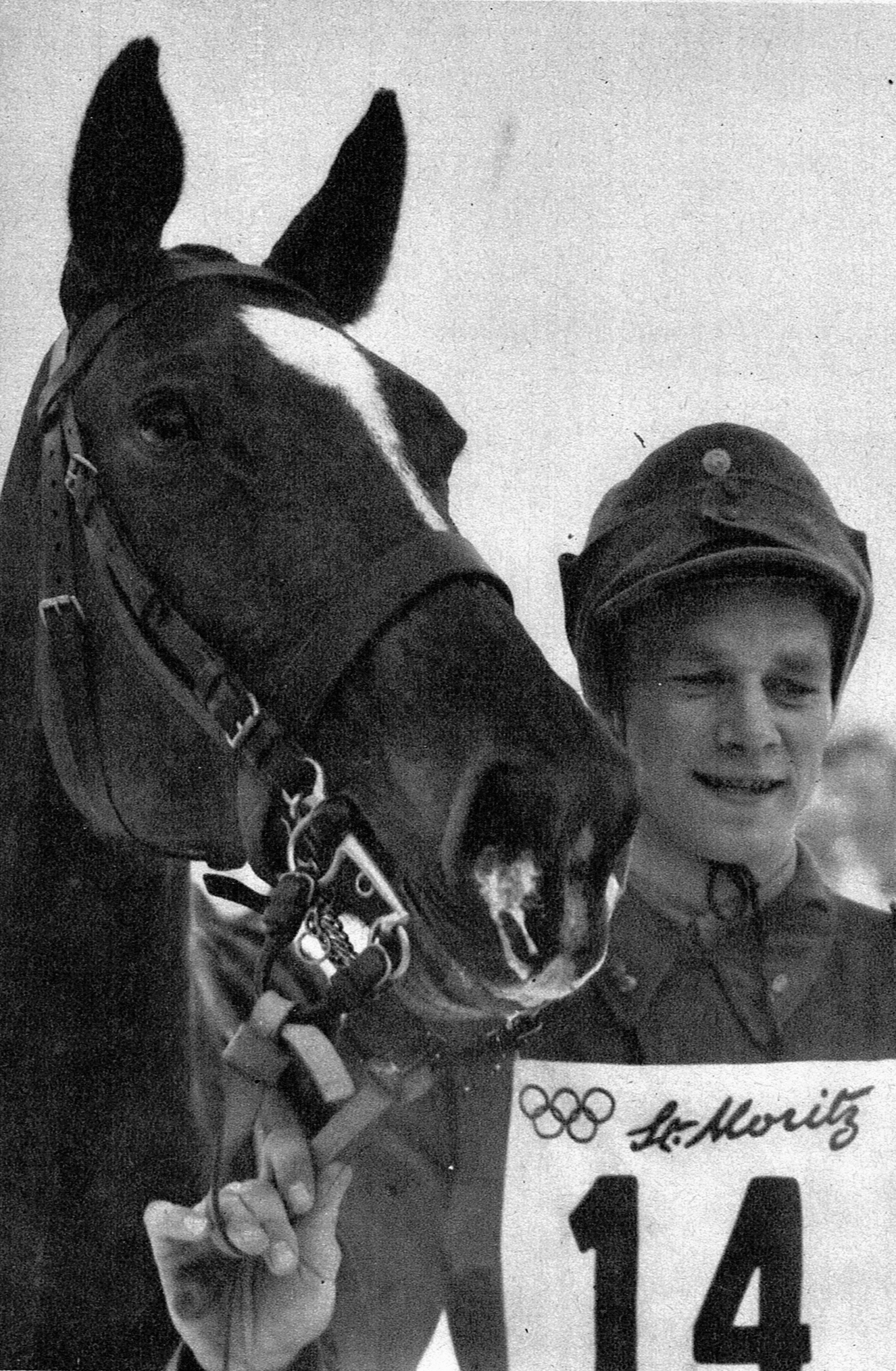
- Lindh during the 1948 Winter Olympics

Personal information
- Full name: Gustaf Allan Lindh
- Nationality: Swedish
- Born: 21 May 1926 Liden, Sundsvall, Sweden
- Died: 3 September 2015 (aged 89) Stockholm, Sweden
Medal record
Representing Sweden
Modern pentathlon
Olympic Games
Gold medal – first place	1948 St. Moritz	Winter Pentathlon

Gustaf Allan Lindh (21 May 1926 – 3 September 2015) was a Swedish former modern pentathlete who competed in the winter pentathlon in the 1948 Winter Olympics and became the event's sole winner.

Winter pentathlon was a one-time event solely held at the Olympic Games in 1948 in St. Moritz. Sweden had four participants, including future Olympic champion William Grut. Grut, Claes Egnell and Bertil Haase were about ten years older than Lindh and at that time the dominant athletes in winter pentathlon, but Lindh went on to defy expectations and caught up. He won the shooting and riding with the only flaw being a sixth rank in the downhill event. His teammate Haase won the downhill and the 10 km cross country, but did not finish tops in shooting, fencing and riding. Grut showed a balanced performance, but Lindh finished a point ahead of him and Haase. The fourth Swede, Egnell, broke his leg in the downhill, and had to abandon the competition in fourth place.

Like all other participants, Lindh was also a member of the armed forces. At age seventeen, he had joined the Swedish Army in Östersund because of the lack of educational opportunities during World War II. He attended military school (Swedish: volontär–, konstapel– och furirskola) as a furir (Private First Class) and excelled in winter sports. Already in his third appearance in a Winter Pentathlon in 1946, he won the Swedish championship and thus qualified for the Olympic Games. In autumn 1948, he was dismissed from the military and began training in the field of energy technology at the Tekniska Fackskolan (Technical Vocational School) in Sundsvall, then worked as an engineer and designer for high-voltage lines. He continued his sports activities until a shattered jaw after a horse riding accident in Stockholm forced him to retire in 1954 and set an end to his career.

Lindh spent some years in the United States, went back to Sweden at the end of the 1960s and lived since in Viksjö, Järfälla northwest of Stockholm. He died in Stockholm in 2015.
