= Chago =

Chago may refer to:

== People ==
- Mathias Chago (born 1983), Cameroonian footballer
- Santiago Armada (1937–1995), Cuban artist and designer nicknamed Chago
- Santiago Rodríguez Masagó (c. 1809 – 1879), Dominican military leader nicknamed Chago
- Yun Kŭnsu (1537–1619), Korean scholar-official of the Joseon period, courtesy name Chago

== Other uses ==
- Mirabilis expansa, a species of flowering plant known as chago
- Chago, a fictional character in "H" Is for Homicide
