= Carlos Velázquez =

Carlos Velázquez may refer to:

- Carlos Velázquez (footballer) (born 1984), Mexican footballer
- Carlos Velázquez (baseball) (1948–2000), Puerto Rican baseball player
- Carlos Velázquez (pentathlete) (born 1925), Argentina pentathlete
- Carlos Velázquez (politician) (born 1980), Spanish politician

== See also ==
- Velazquez
- Carlos Velásquez (born 1984), Puerto Rican boxer
