= Winter pentathlon at the 1948 Winter Olympics =

At the 1948 Winter Olympics in St. Moritz, a winter pentathlon competition was held. It was one of two demonstration sports held at these Games.

The pentathlon was composed of five segments:

- cross-country skiing
- shooting
- downhill skiing
- fencing
- horse riding

== Results ==
1. Gustaf Lindh (SWE)
2. William Grut (SWE)
3. Bertil Haase (SWE)
4. Somazzi Vincenzo (SUI)
5. Rumpf Hans (SUI)
6. Derek Allhusen (GBR)
7. Peter Griessler (AUT)
8. H. Schriber (SUI)
9. J. A. O. Walker (GBR)
10. Percy Legard (GBR)
11. Willoughby Maurice (GBR)
12. Claes Egnell (SWE)
13. Viktor Platan (FIN)
14. Josef Vollmeier (SUI)

== Medal table ==
Places	Team	Athlete	Cross-country Skiing	Shooting	Downhill Skiing	Fencing	Equestrianism	Total
1	Sweden	Gustaf Lindh	2	1	6	4	1	14
2	Sweden	William Grut	3	3	4	3	2	15
3	Sweden	Bertil Haase	1	5	1	6	4	17
4	Swiss	Somazzi Vincenzo	8	9	2	1	5	25
5	Swiss	Rumpf Hans	9	4	3	1	9	26
6	Great Britain	Allhusen Derek	11	8	11	11	3	44
7	Austrian	Griessler	5	12	7	10	11	45
8	Swiss	Schriber	10	10	10	4	10	45
9	Great Britain	Walker	12	13	9	6	7	47
10	Great Britain	Legard Percy Charles	14	11	8	9	6	48
11	Great Britain	Willoughby Maurice	13	14	13	6	8	54
12	Sweden	Claes Egnell	4	2	5			
13	Finland	Platan Viktor	6	7	12			
14	Swiss	Vollmeier	7	6	14			
