= Guy Troy =

American modern pentathlete (1923–2023)

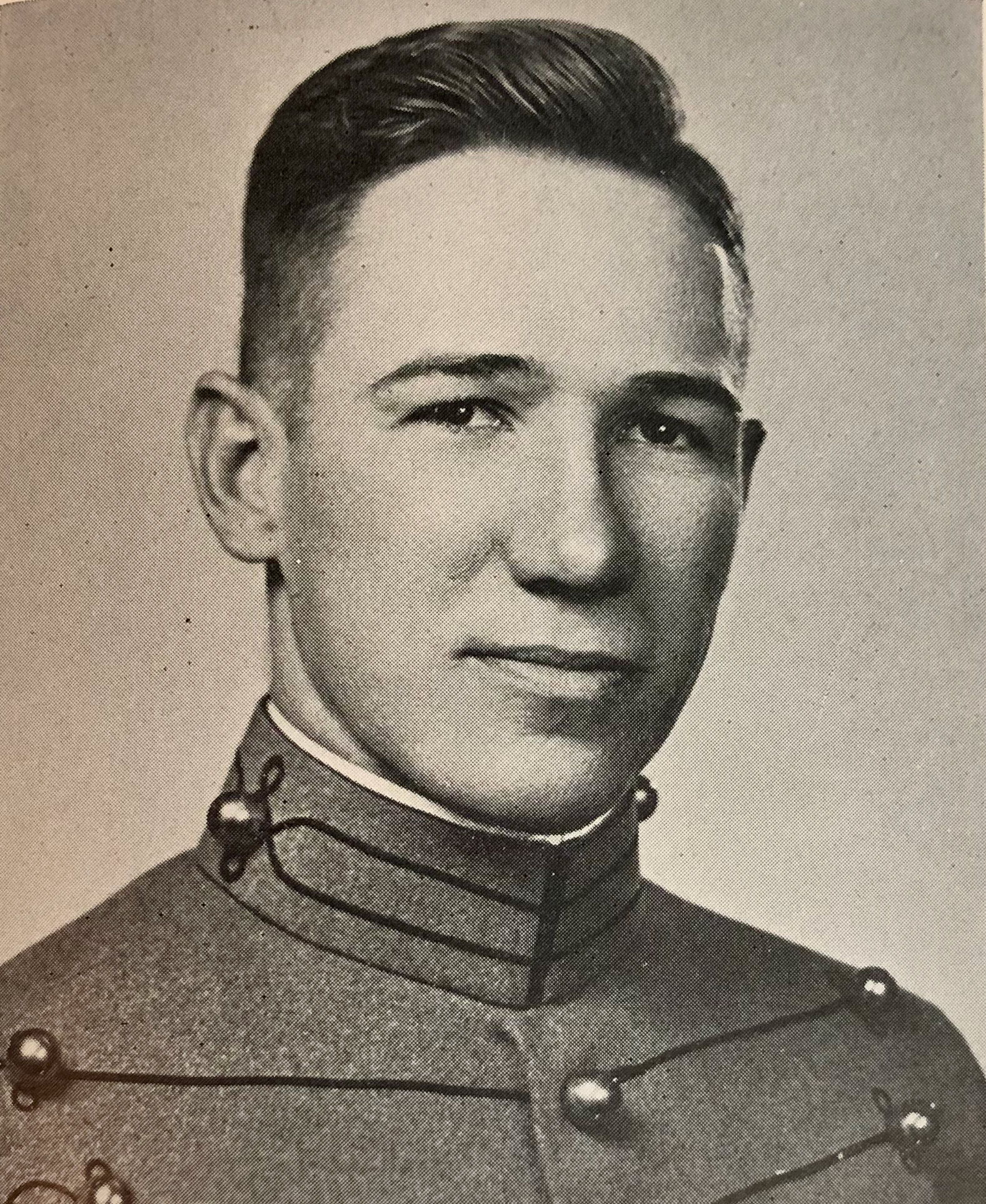
- Troy in 1946

Personal information
- Born: Guy Kent Troy; March 15, 1923 Washington, D.C., U.S.
- Died: March 17, 2023 (aged 100) Liberty, North Carolina, U.S.

Sport
- Sport: Modern pentathlon

Guy Kent Troy (March 15, 1923 – March 17, 2023) was an American modern pentathlete. He competed at the 1952 Summer Olympics.

== Early life and education ==
Troy was nominated to the United States Military Academy by Florida Senator Charles O. Andrews. He arrived at the academy in July 1943, graduated in 1946, and was assigned to the armor branch of the U.S. Army.

== Military career ==
Troy returned to West Point in 1951 as commander of the Pentathlon Training Center where he led the Olympic Modern Pentathlon team and competed in the 1952 Olympics Modern Pentathlon event. His other duties included oversight of the last horses at the West Point Riding Hall. Troy retired from the U.S. Army as a colonel.

== Civilian career ==
After retiring from the military, Troy began a career in farming where he managed the Woodlot Management Equipment Company that raised and sold corn, soybeans, wheat, and trees. He continued his involvement in modern pentathlon serving as secretary and later president of the U.S. Modern Pentathlon Association, vice president of the International Modern Pentathlon Federation, a member of the board of directors of the U.S. Olympic Committee, and president and founder of the Pan American Modern Pentathlon Confederation.

In 2017, Troy reunited with his pentathlon teammates from the 1952 Olympics, Frederick L. Denman and William "Thad" McArthur. The reunion was held on Joint Base Lewis-McChord in Washington at a pistol range similar to the one used by the team during the 1952 Olympics. According to Troy's son, Kent, who organized the event, the team was unique in that all were in the U.S. Army and two were graduates from USMA thus representing the last all-military U.S. Olympic pentathlon team, the one which was fielded at the 1952 Olympics.

== Personal life and death ==
Troy had two sons, Guy Kent Jr. (Kent) and Thaddeus W. (Thad), and a daughter, Pamela C. Sims. Kent also graduated from USMA.

Troy died at his home near Liberty, North Carolina, on March 17, 2023, two days after turning 100.
