= William Grut =

Swedish modern pentathlete

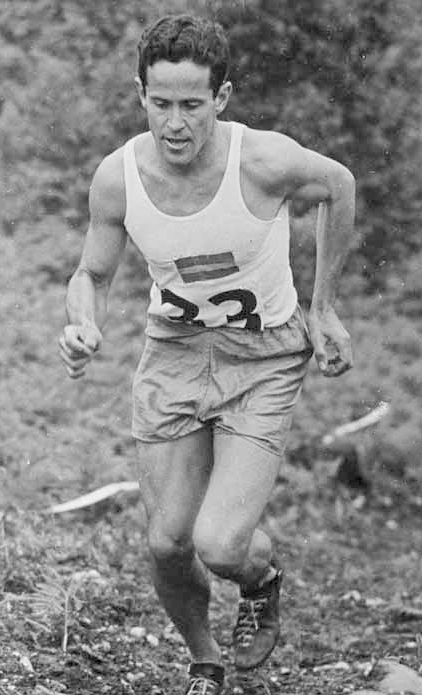
- At the London Summer Olympic Games 1948

Personal information
- Nationality: Swedish
- Born: 17 September 1914 Stockholm, Sweden
- Died: 20 November 2012 (aged 98) Östersund, Sweden

Sport
- Country: Sweden
- Sport: Modern pentathlon
Medal record
Representing Sweden
Olympic Games
Gold medal – first place	1948 London	Individual

William Oscar Guernsey Grut (17 September 1914 – 20 November 2012) was a Swedish modern pentathlete. He competed at the 1948 Summer Olympics in London, where he won the gold medal in modern pentathlon. Grut was a multiple Swedish swimming champion and received the Svenska Dagbladet Gold Medal in 1948.

Grut was born to the architect Torben Grut, who designed the 1912 Olympic Stadium in Stockholm, and Margit Torssell, the daughter of the Norwegian opera singer Olefine Moe. He qualified as a student in May 1932, the same year his father lost most of his earnings as a consequence of the Krueger crash. Grut's first choice would have been to study medicine, and he had gained a place at Pembroke College, Cambridge, but that dream ended with the stock market crash. Grut chose a career in the army instead, where the training was free and where he could fulfill his desire to contribute to his country's defence.

His father had been Swedish tennis champion around the turn of the century, but Grut did not follow in his footsteps, as his natural talent was swimming. Grut set a new junior record for 100 m freestyle swimming in 1928 and went on to win a series of Swedish Championships in the 200 m, 400 m and 1500 m freestyle.

In 1936 Grut formed part of the Swedish swimming team at the Berlin Olympic Games, where he saw the German pentathlete Gotthard Handrick win gold in Modern Pentathlon. Until then, Modern Pentathlon gold medals had been the preserve of Swedish pentathletes: Liliehöök in 1912 (Stockholm), Dyrssen in 1920 (Antwerp), Lindman in 1924 (Paris), Thofelt in 1928 (Amsterdam), Oxenstierna in 1932 (Los Angeles).

In February 1948, Grut took part in the Winter Olympic Games held in St. Moritz. He was a member of the Swedish Winter Pentathlon team, together with Claes Egnell, Gustaf Lindh and Bertil Haase. The team competed in an exhibition event, which consisted of downhill skiing, cross-country skiing, shooting, fencing and riding. Lindh won gold and Grut won silver. Grut saw St. Moritz as a "rehearsal" for the Summer Olympiads to be held the same year.

Grut arrived in London for the 1948 Olympic Games very well prepared. The modern pentathlon event was organized in Aldershot. Grut's Swedish teammates were Gösta Gärdin and Sune Wehlin. Grut had an element of luck in drawing a good horse, Clarian Boy, for the riding event, and from then he went on to complete his best competition result ever. Modern pentathlon scores were calculated according to ranking in each event in those days (the lower the score, the better), and Grut's final result was 1+1+5+1+8=16, an unbroken record. Grut thereby won Olympic Gold in Modern Pentathlon. Gärdin won bronze.

Sweden took home 17 Olympic Gold Medals from London. The prestigious "Svenska Dagbladet Achievement Award" (Svenska Dagbladets Guldmedalj) was awarded to Grut that year.

Grut stopped competing after the London Olympic Games and started managing the Swedish Modern Pentathlon team instead. He coached Lars Hall, who went on to win two Olympic Gold Medals (Helsinki, 1952, and Melbourne, 1956). In 1960, Grut was elected secretary general of the International Modern Pentathlon and Biathlon Union (UIPMB), a post he held for 24 years. The same year he served as a flag bearer for Sweden at the 1960 Summer Olympics. In his spare time, Grut took up golf – his handicap never fell below 12, but golf still brought him immense pleasure in later life.

At Karlberg military academy, Grut's sports teacher had advised his young cadets to "pursue sports until the day you die, but do not let sports be the death of you" – a piece of advice Grut took to heart and abided by all his life.
