= Otto Jemelka =

Czech pentathlete (1914–2008)

Personal information
- Nationality: Czech
- Born: 21 February 1914 Prague, Bohemia, Austria-Hungary
- Died: 16 March 2008 (aged 94) Prague, Czech Republic

Sport
- Country: Czechoslovakia
- Sport: Modern pentathlon

Otto Jemelka (21 February 1914 – 16 March 2008) was a Czech modern pentathlete. He competed for Czechoslovakia at the 1948 Summer Olympics.

== Biography ==
Jemelka was born in Prague on 21 February 1914. In 1937, he graduated from the military academy in Hranice. He was then transferred to Rokycany, where the colonel of his unit taught him fencing. During World War II, he lived in Prague and married there. He became a member of the army sports club ATK Prague.

In 1948, Jemelka was selected to represent Czechoslovakia at the Summer Olympics in modern pentathlon. He placed 39th out of 45 participants. He was then transferred to Liptovský Mikuláš, where he founded a modern pentathlon club (as part of Dukla Liptovský Mikuláš club). After leaving the army for civilian life, he moved back to Prague, where he lived until his death. He died in Prague on 16 March 2008, at the age of 94.
