= Viktor Platan =

Finnish modern pentathlete

Personal information
- Born: 16 October 1919 Lappeenranta, Finland
- Died: 12 January 2013 (aged 93)

Sport
- Sport: Modern pentathlon
Medal record
Men's modern pentathlon
Representing Finland
World Modern Pentathlon Championships
Silver medal – second place	1949 Stockholm	Team
Silver medal – second place	1950 Berna	Team
Silver medal – second place	1951 Helsingborg	Team
Bronze medal – third place	1949 Stockholm	Individual

Viktor Platan (16 October 1919 — 12 January 2013) was a Finnish pentathlete. He competed at the 1948 Summer Olympics in London, where he finished 10th in a field of 45 participants in the individual event. He also finished 13th among 14 athletes in the winter pentathlon demonstration event at the 1948 Winter Olympics, after failing to complete the program. He then competed at the 1949, 1950, and 1951 World Modern Pentathlon Championships, winning silver medals with the Finnish team in each and an individual bronze medal in 1949. He was born in Lappeenranta.
