= Ralph Rodríguez =

Puerto Rican sport shooter

Personal information
- Born: 29 July 1941 New York, New York, United States
- Died: 7 April 2024 (aged 82)

Sport
- Country: Puerto Rico
- Sport: Sports shooting
Medal record
Representing Puerto Rico
Central American and Caribbean Games
Gold medal – first place	1974 Santo Domingo	50m rifle prone
Gold medal – first place	1974 Santo Domingo	50m rifle prone team
Gold medal – first place	1986 Santiago	50m rifle prone
Gold medal – first place	1998 Maracaibo	50m rifle prone
Silver medal – second place	1986 Santiago	50m rifle prone team
Silver medal – second place	1990 Mexico City	50m rifle prone
Silver medal – second place	1993 Ponce	50m rifle prone team
Bronze medal – third place	1978 Medellin	50m rifle prone
Bronze medal – third place	1978 Medellin	50m rifle prone team
Bronze medal – third place	1982 Havana	50m rifle prone
Bronze medal – third place	1990 Mexico City	50m rifle prone team
Bronze medal – third place	1993 Ponce	50m rifle 3 positions team
Bronze medal – third place	1998 Maracaibo	50m rifle prone team

Ralph Rodríguez Beauchamp (29 July 1941 – 7 April 2024) was a Puerto Rican sport shooter who competed in the Summer Olympics of 1968, 1976, 1992, 1996 and 2000. He was one of the torch lighters of the 2010 Central American and Caribbean Games.

== See also ==
- List of athletes with the most appearances at Olympic Games
