= Olefine Moe =

Norwegian opera singer and actress (1850–1933)

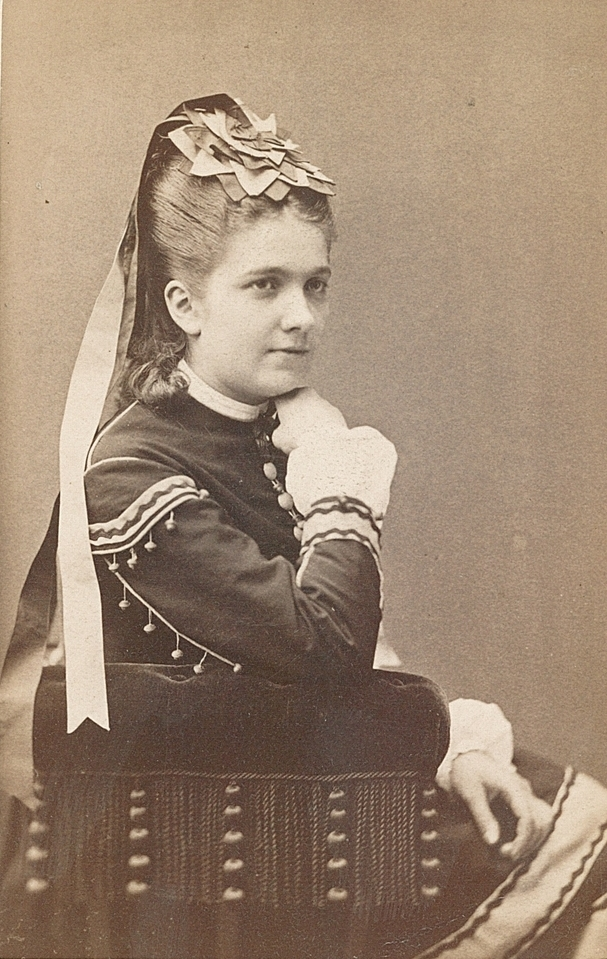
- Olefine Moe in 1880
- Born: Olefine Louise Margarethe Moe; 18 March 1850; Bergen, Vestland, Norway
- Died: 8 November 1933 (aged 83); Ås, Akershus, Norway
- Occupation(s): Opera singer, actress, opera director, singing teacher
- Spouse: Oscar Fridolf Torssell (m. 1877; died 1880)

Olefine Louise Margarethe Moe (18 March 1850 – 8 November 1933) was a Norwegian opera singer, actress, opera director and singing teacher who created Norway's first permanent music theatre.

== Early life ==
Olefine Louise Margarethe Moe was born on 18 March 1850 in Bergen to oboist and dance teacher Iver Christian Moe and Inger Marie Amundsen. Her godfather was violinist Ole Bull, whom she was named after. Moe displayed a talent for music from an early age, often singing along to her own piano arrangements. During her childhood, her family moved to Christiania.

== Career ==
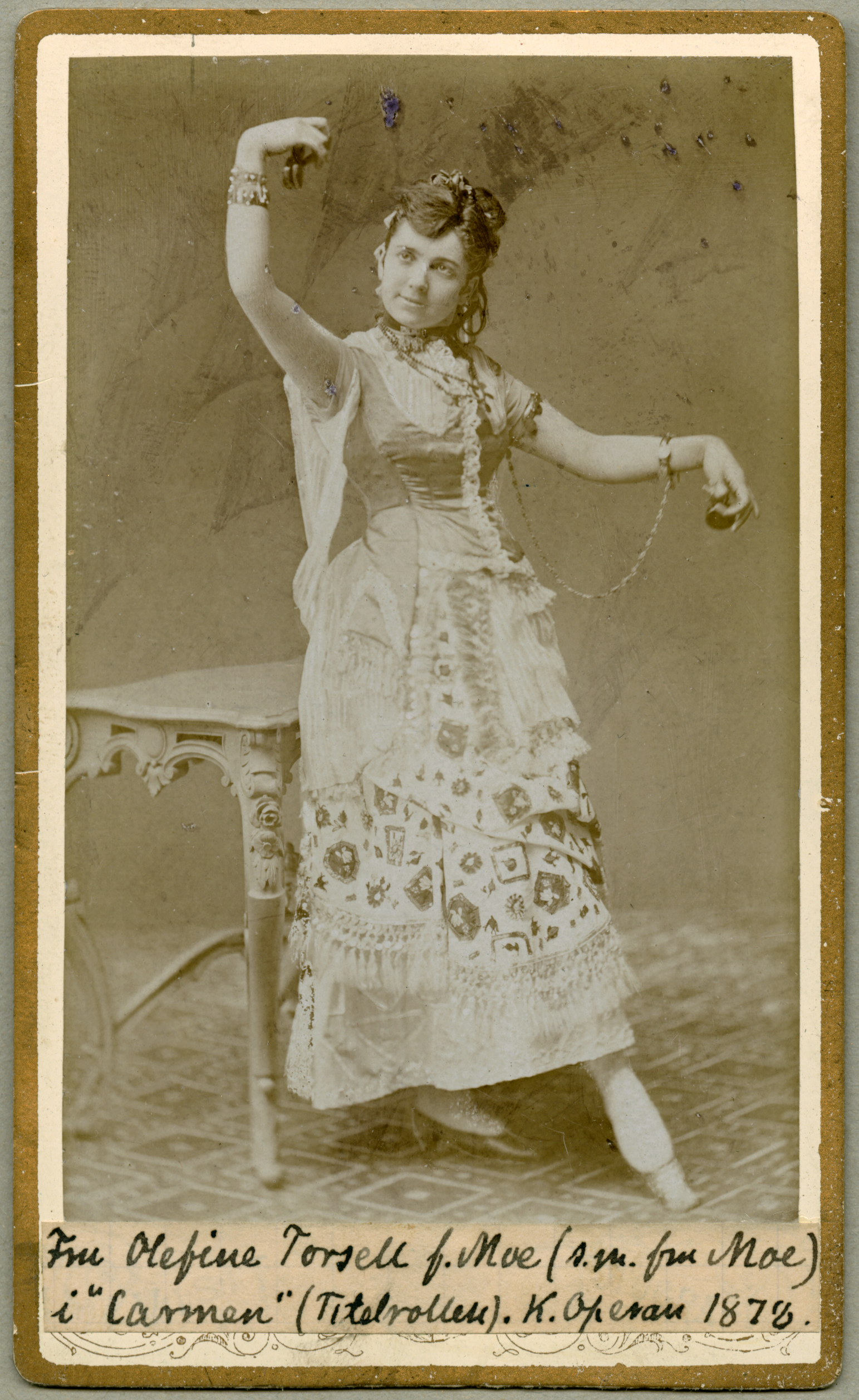
Olefine Moe in the titular role of Carmen in 1878

At the age of 17, Moe made her debut as an actress as Emeline in Eugène Scribe's The First Love at the Christiania Theatre. In January 1868, she received a permanent engagement at the theatre. Moe's first singing role was in Sveitserhytten. Moe's talent in singing roles was quickly noticed and she was given more of these roles. She fascinated audiences with a captivating personality and a "silver-toned" voice on stage despite never receiving any vocal training and being completely self-taught. However, she did later receive training from Henrik Mayer.

In 1870, Swedish singer Louise Michaëli visited Christiania, she noticed Moe's talent and the following year, following Michaëli's advice, Moe travelled to Stockholm and became a student of Fredrika Stenhammar. A year later, in May 1872, she debuted at Royal Swedish Opera with the titular role in the opera Martha by Flotow. Subsequently, she was immediately contracted by the opera on a permanent basis, where she found success in a number of demanding leading roles. However, she left there in 1881, after a disagreement with the conductor.

In Autumn 1883, along with Swedish writer Mattis Lundström, she founded Norway's first permanent opera stage at Christiania Tivoli, where she acted as opera director, instructor and singer in leading roles. During the summer of 1884, Moe returned to her hometown of Bergen with the Tivoli opera ensemble. Moe presented four operas that she had directed, The Marriage of Figaro, Martha, Mignon and La part du diable. The two women, with help from both Norwegian and foreign musicians, managed to keep the theatre going until 1886, when they had to close it due to financial issues. However, the theatre director Bjørn Bjørnson employed the artists who worked at the opera.

== Personal life ==
On 15 May 1877, Moe married Swedish pianist Oscar Fridolf Torssell (1844–1880) in Stockholm. Their daughters Margit Torsell (1878–1968) and Astri Torssell (1879–1951) were also actors. Margit was married to Swedish pentathlete William Grut (1914–2012), while Astri was married to Norwegian architect Christian von Munthe (1880–1967).

== Later life and death ==
For the final years of her career, Moe was not attached to any theatre on a permanent basis but continued to give guest performances in Christiania and Stockholm, where she also worked as a singing teacher. She was also engaged in Bergen in 1901.

Moe died on 8 November 1933 in Ås, at the age of 83. She was cremated three days later on 11 November and was interred at Vår Frelsers gravlund in Oslo.

== Other sources ==
- Olefine Europas konstnärer
