= Percy Legard =

British Army officer and sportsman

Personal information
- Full name: Charles Percy Digby Legard
- Born: 17 June 1906 Saltash, Cornwall, England
- Died: 16 February 1980 (aged 73) Ryedale, North Yorkshire, England

Sport
- Sport: Modern pentathlon, Nordic combined, Winter pentathlon

Percy Legard (17 June 1906 – 16 February 1980) was a British Army officer and sportsman. Legard competed as an Olympian in both Summer and Winter disciplines. He was, respectively, a modern pentathlete and a Nordic combined skier. He also took part in the demonstration of the winter pentathlon as an Olympic sport. In addition, he took part in the inaugural meeting of the Badminton Horse Trials. He was a regular officer in the British Army and during the Second World War he served in the Commandos, where he was the initial Commanding Officer of No.4 Commando.

== Early life ==
Legard was born in 1906 in Saltash in Cornwall but spent most of his childhood in Sweden, where he developed his un-English expertise in skiing and other Nordic sports. He came from a junior branch of the long-established family of Yorkshire gentry. The family had been loyal servants of the Crown since the Civil War and his father, grandfather and great-grandfather were all officers, either of the British Army - and Britain's Indian Army - or, since the family lived close to Scarborough, the Royal Navy. Legard's father was a naval officer.

He returned to England to enter the Royal Military College, Sandhurst. On passing out, he joined the elite cavalry regiment which, after a couple of variants of name-style, became known as the 5th Royal Inniskilling Dragoon Guards. In 1938 the regiment was mechanised to become an armoured regiment.

== Athletic career ==
Legard became the British ski-jump champion in St. Moritz in January 1929. Legard became one of the first three British men to achieve a 50 m. jump, together with Guy Nixon and Colin Wyatt. These three men were considered sufficiently credible competitors to represent Britain in the 1931 World Championships in Oberhof in Thüringen in Germany. 73 men entered the competition but only 47 completed the events, among whom was Legard, in 43rd place. Legard attended the 1934 World Championships, held at Sollefteå in Sweden. The field was 71, but this time Legard had less success and came 65th overall.

=== Olympics ===
Following the 1931 winter championships, Legard had added five new events as he was training for modern pentathlon in the Summer Olympics. In the Summer Olympics, he competed in the modern pentathlon at both the 1932 and in 1936 Summer Olympics. In the Los Angeles meeting, Legard came 8th overall and won the 4 kilometre cross-country element. In the Berlin meeting Legard came 19th and was 4th in the cross-country.

At this time, the Summer and Winter Olympiads were still held in the same year and as well as the 1936 Summer Olympics, Legard competed in the Winter games of that year. His event was the Nordic combined, which married a 15 kilometre cross-country ski-race with 2 attempts at the ski-jump. 46 competitors completed the events, including Legard who came 44th. To date, Legard is the only Briton ever to have competed in this event at the Olympics. Legard's Olympic career was interrupted by the war years, which eliminated the Olympiads of 1940 and 1944. Nevertheless, he was to make one more Olympic appearance after the War, in 1948, some sixteen years after his first Olympic appearance.

== Commando ==
Legard was a serving officer in the British Army and the sports in which he chose to participate were all considered appropriate for the development of athleticism. When the Second World War broke out in 1939, Legard's regiment had only just pensioned-off its horses in favour of Mark VI light tanks. The regiment was sent to France with the British Expeditionary Force, but in 1940 these light tanks could not match their Panzerwaffe counterparts and the regiment was soon involved in the confused withdrawal that led to Dunkirk.

Back in Britain, the armoured units awaited be re-equipped with more modern and powerful weapons. Meanwhile, the new Prime Minister Winston Churchill was keen to keep the land forces busy and pre-empt a spirit of defeatism from taking hold in the British Army. He also wished to prick the sense of invincibility of the Wehrmacht. His answer was a force of Commandos, volunteers to cross the Channel and harass the enemy garrisons the length of the coastline of occupied Europe. Legard became a member of this force and the Commandos soon developed an esprit de corps and a methodology and expertise in amphibious warfare. A formal training programme was developed and established at Achnacarry. At 34 years of age, he was much older than most of the Commandos, but as an experienced officer, his value lay more as a unit commander than as a leader of the individual assault teams. Legard was soon given command of No.4 Commando, as a Lieutenant-Colonel. This Commando gained a reputation as one of the best and was chosen to be one of those earmarked for the Normandy Landings, under Legard's successor, Lord Lovat.

== Post-War ==
In the 1948 Winter Olympics at St. Moritz, the winter pentathlon was introduced as a demonstration sport. 11 men completed all events, among whom was Legard, who came 10th. The Badminton Horse Trials were inaugurated in May 1949 by the Duke of Beaufort to assist train British equestrians for international competition. Legard was one of the original competitors, but his horse, Varne, became stuck and did not complete. Legard died in Ryedale in 1980.
