= George Moore (pentathlete) =

American modern pentathlete (1918–2014)

Personal information
- Born: October 6, 1918 St. Louis, Missouri, U.S.
- Died: July 4, 2014 (aged 95)

Sport
- Sport: Modern pentathlon
Medal record
Men's modern pentathlon
Representing United States
Olympic Games
Silver medal – second place	1948 London	Individual

Colonel George Bissland Moore (October 6, 1918 – July 4, 2014) was an American modern pentathlete who competed at the 1948 Summer Olympics in London, where he won a silver medal in that year's modern pentathlon competition. Born in St. Louis, Missouri, he graduated from the Lawrenceville School in Lawrenceville, New Jersey in 1936. He was a track and field athlete at the United States Military Academy prior to becoming involved in the modern pentathlon. He served during World War II and was injured, earning a Purple Heart, two Bronze Star Medals, and the Legion of Merit. He later taught at the United States Military Academy before retiring in 1965 to pursue computer management and educational administration. He worked at the Lawrenceville School, his alma mater, until the 1980s.
