= Alan Fuller =

Australian rules footballer

Personal information
- Full name: Alan Samson Fuller
- Born: 1 August 1912; Boulder, Western Australia
- Died: 1 May 1995 (aged 82)
- Original team: Auburn
- Height: 178 cm (5 ft 10 in)
- Weight: 79 kg (174 lb)

Playing career^{1}
Years	Club	Games (Goals)
1934–1935	Hawthorn	23 (2)
- ^{1} Playing statistics correct to the end of 1935.

Alan Samson Fuller (1 August 1912 – 1 May 1995) was an Australian rules footballer who played for the Hawthorn Football Club in the Victorian Football League (VFL).

He later served in the Australian Army during World War II.
