= Harold Logan (footballer) =

Australian rules footballer

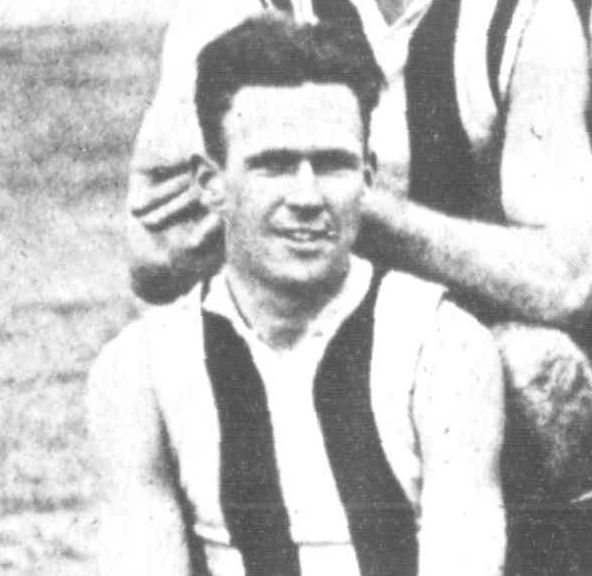

Personal information
- Full name: Harold Douglas Lincoln Logan
- Born: 18 March 1906
- Died: 28 May 1995 (aged 89)
- Position: Forward

Playing career
Years	Club	Games (Goals)
1925–1934	Port Adelaide	115 (265)

Career highlights
- Port Adelaide premiership player (1928); 3x Port Adelaide leading goal-kicker (1925, 1926, 1927)

Harold Logan (18 March 1906 – 28 May 1995) was an Australian rules footballer who played for the Port Adelaide Football Club. During his career he averaged over two goals a game and won a premiership with Port Adelaide in 1928.

Harold Logan kicked four goals during the 1928 SAFL Grand Final against Norwood.
