= Ernst Eggerbauer =

German ice hockey player

Personal information
- Nationality: German
- Born: 16 April 1932; Füssen, Germany
- Died: 10 May 1995 (aged 63); Füssen, Germany

Sport
- Sport: Ice hockey

Ernst Eggerbauer (16 April 1932 – 10 May 1995) was a German ice hockey player. He competed in the men's tournament at the 1960 Winter Olympics.
