= Jim Redstone =

Australian rules footballer

Personal information
- Full name: Milson James Redstone
- Born: 3 December 1915; Kingston upon Thames, England
- Died: 3 May 1995 (aged 79)
- Original team: East Brunswick
- Height: 179 cm (5 ft 10 in)
- Weight: 75 kg (165 lb)

Playing career^{1}
Years	Club	Games (Goals)
1938	South Melbourne	4 (5)
- ^{1} Playing statistics correct to the end of 1938.

Milson James Redstone (3 December 1915 – 3 May 1995) was an Australian rules footballer who played with South Melbourne in the Victorian Football League (VFL).

Redstone later served in the Australian Army during World War II.
