= Geno DeNobile =

Canadian football player

No. 55, 62
- Position: Guard

Personal information
- Born: March 6, 1933; Hamilton, Ontario
- Died: May 5, 1995 (aged 62)
- Listed height: 6 ft 0 in (1.83 m)
- Listed weight: 225 lb (102 kg)

Career information
- CJFL: Hamilton Tiger-Cats Junior B's

Career history
- 1956–64: Hamilton Tiger-Cats

Awards and highlights
- 2× Grey Cup champion (1957 & 63)

Geno DeNobile (March 6, 1933 – May 5, 1995) was a Grey Cup champion Canadian football player, playing from 1956 to 1964 with the Hamilton Tiger-Cats.

Born in Hamilton, he came up through the ranks with the Hamilton Tiger-Cats Junior B team. He was an unsung hero of the great Tiger-Cat teams. Though he was never an all-star during his 9-year career, he played in seven Grey Cup games, winning two of them in 1957 and 1963.

He died on May 5, 1995.
