= Jacques Perreten =

Swiss ski jumper

Jacques Perreten (25 February 1927 – 19 May 1995) was a Swiss ski jumper who competed in the 1950s. He finished 23rd in the individual large hill event at the 1952 Winter Olympics in Oslo.
