= Jorge Cáceres (pentathlete) =

Argentine modern pentathlete

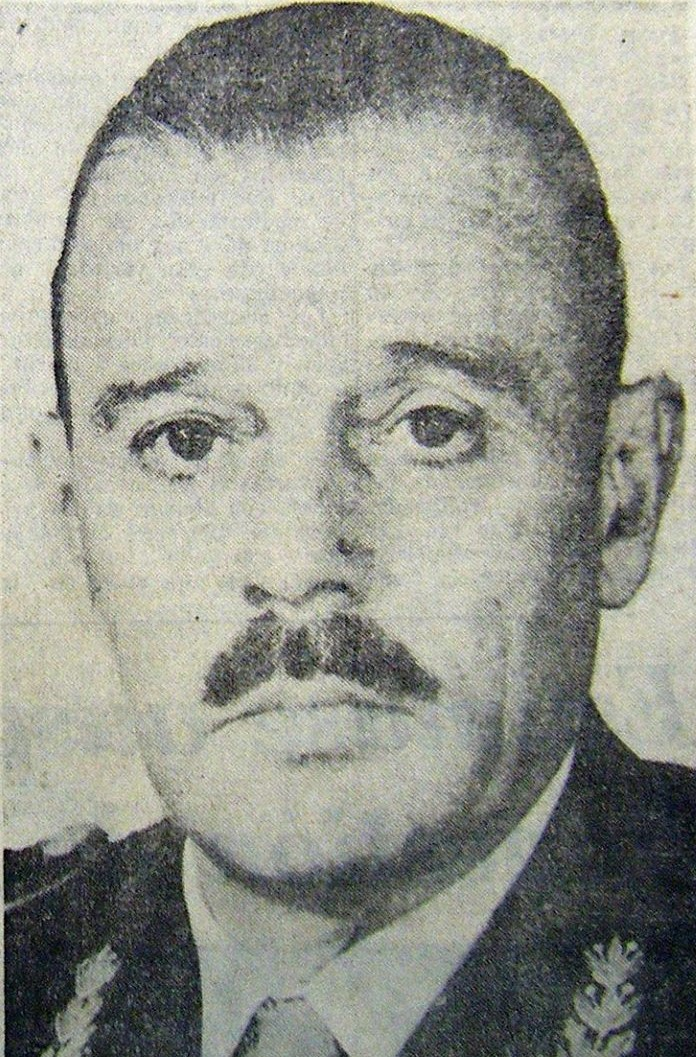

Personal information
- Full name: Jorge Esteban Cáceres Monié
- Born: 14 April 1917 Paraná, Entre Ríos, Argentina
- Died: 3 December 1975 (aged 58) Paraná, Entre Ríos, Argentina

Sport
- Sport: Modern pentathlon

Jorge Cáceres (14 April 1917 – 3 December 1975) was an Argentine modern pentathlete and Argentine army general. His brother, José Rafael Cáceres Monié, was the Minister of Defense under the presidencies of Roberto Marcelo Levingston and Alejandro Agustín Lanusse.

== Early life ==
Cáceres was born in 1917 in Paraná, Entre Ríos, Argentina. He entered Colegio Militar de la Nación in 1925, and graduated as a second lieutenant. He competed in the modern pentathlon event at the 1952 Summer Olympics, and placed 34th individually and 8th as a team.

== Military career ==
From 1970 to 1971, Cáceres served as the chief of the Argentine Federal Police. He retired from the military in September 1972, and was honored by Chile and Paraguay.

== Assassination ==
Cáceres was assassinated along with his wife by the left-wing guerilla group Monteneros on 3 December 1975 in Paraná, a few months before the beginning of the military dictatorship of Jorge Rafael Videla. The couple was survived by a son.
