= László Karácson =

Hungarian modern pentathlete

Personal information
- Born: 24 November 1918 Budapest, Hungary
- Died: 1 May 2004 (aged 85)

Sport
- Sport: Modern pentathlon

László Karácson (24 November 1918 – 1 May 2004) was a Hungarian army officer who competed in modern pentathlon at the 1948 Summer Olympics. He broke his collar bone in the opening event, the cross-country riding. He nevertheless continued in the fencing and shooting events using his weaker arm, finishing 11th and 32nd respectively. He withdrew from the swimming and cross-country running, finishing last of the 45 competitors.
