= Kanhiyalal Mishra Prabhakar =

Indian journalist, writer (1906–1995)

- Born: 29 May 1906; Deoband, Saharanpur, Uttar Pradesh, India
- Died: 9 May 1995 (aged 88); Saharanpur
- Occupations: Journalist; Writer; Freedom fighter
- Children: Harsh Prabhakar, Yash Prabhakar
- Awards: Padma Shri

Kanhiyalal Mishra Prabhakar was an Indian journalist, writer and freedom fighter. He was born on 29 May 1906 at Deoband, Saharanpur in the Indian state of Uttar Pradesh. He participated in the Indian freedom struggle and endured jail terms several times. Mishra published several books and Deep Jale Sankh Baja ("दीप जले-शंख बजे"), Mati ho gai Sona (माटी हो गई सोना), Jindagi Muskarai ("ज़िन्दगी मुस्कुराई"), Baje payaliya ke ghungroo ( "बाजे पायलिया के घुंघरू"), Nayi pidhi nayi Vichar ('नयी पीढ़ी, नये विचार') and Aakash ke Tare Dharti ke Phool आकाश के तारे- धरती के फूल) are some of his notable works. He was also the editor of the journal, the Enlightenment. The Government of India awarded him the fourth highest civilian award of Padma Shri in 1990. Five years later, Mishra died on 9 May 1995, at the age of 88.
