= Keith McPhee =

Australian rules footballer, born 1914

Personal information
- Full name: Keith Ross McPhee
- Born: 10 July 1914; Castlemaine, Victoria
- Died: 5 May 1995 (aged 80); Geelong, Victoria

Playing career^{1}
Years	Club	Games (Goals)
1935	Fitzroy	1 (0)
- ^{1} Playing statistics correct to the end of 1935.

Keith Ross McPhee (10 July 1914 – 5 May 1995) was an Australian rules footballer who played with Fitzroy in the Victorian Football League (VFL).

McPhee enlisted and served in the Australian Army during World War II, seeing service in Port Moresby and Borneo.
