= Ichisada Miyazaki =

Japanese historian

- Born: August 20, 1901; Iiyama, Nagano
- Died: May 24, 1995 (aged 93); Nagano prefecture, Japan
- Occupation: Historian (Chinese history)

Ichisada Miyazaki (宮崎市定, August 20, 1901 – May 24, 1995) was a Japanese historian specializing in Chinese history. He represents the second generation of the Kyoto school founded by his teacher Naitō Konan (Naitō Torajirō).

== Early life ==
Miyazaki is the second son of a primary school teacher who dwelled in Iiyama (飯山) in the northeast of Nagano Prefecture. He finished his studies at Akitsu Elementary School (秋津小學). He became a student of Iiyama junior high school. In third year, he attended a school excursion for a week. This is the first time he visited Kyoto. They returned to Nagano through Nara and Osaka.

He graduated from junior high school in March, 1919. In September, he entered Matsumoto Senior High School. After senior high school, he entered the Faculty of Letters of Kyoto Imperial University (now Kyoto University) in 1922. He mainly studied East Asian history. He graduated in 1925 and become a post-graduate student in the same year. He volunteered and joined the 14th regiment of the Japanese 114th army division. One year later he taught in Kyoto First Prefectural Middle School (京都府立一中), the Kyoto Sixth High School and Kyoto Third High School successively, and then returned to Kyoto Imperial University.

In 1929, he married his colleague's younger sister Mrs. Konishi. She bore a girl the next year. In the 1930s, Sino-Japanese relations were so difficult that Miyazaki was conscripted and appointed as the chief of a military horse ranch in 1932. The next year he left the army and went back to campus. In 1936, he was assigned to a study mission abroad. He visited Cairo on his way to France. After a short trip in Egypt with his fellows, he arrived in Paris. In Paris, he studied French at Alliance Française. Simultaneously he was influenced by a fellow who was a student in Oriental language school. He studied Arabic. In 1937, he was recommended by Tooru Haneda to attend the World Human anthropology and prehistoric archaeology conference in Bucharest, Romania. He obtained travel expenses from the Japanese government. After the meeting, he traveled to Istanbul, entered into Syria from Asia minor, and then visited Mosul and Baghdad. His budget didn't allow him to visit Iran. He returned to Syria and to Egypt for sightseeing . He returned to Paris via Greece and Italy. He returned to Japan via the United States to become a teacher at his old school.

In February 1945, he was conscripted again. After the Japanese defeat in World War II, he returned to his old campus until he retired in 1965, where he continued his research at until 1995 when he died.

== Academic career ==
In high school he fell in love with writing Waka. He adored the Japanese poet Toson Shimazaki and took "宮崎藤仙" as a pen name. With his classmates he carved plate to printing magazines. His craft of writing was enriched at this time. Moreover, when class ended he went to the local Catholic cathedral to study French with classmates.

Before he enrolled in university, he wrote an article about Kyoto. It can be seen that "the connections between the ancient Han ethnic group and simplicity northern nomadic ethnic group" were his early interests.

When he was an undergraduate he audited philosophy, economics, linguistics, religious studies, sinology and tangutology. He focused on the history of the Song dynasty. He became a teacher of Kyoto sixth high school. He chose the history of Chinese South-north dynasties as his research orientation. He wrote Study on the rule of Nine-ranks officials and other papers.

After he transferred to Kyoto third high school, he taught western history. After he arrived in Paris in 1937, he became fascinated by studies on east–west cultural connections. The paper "La Chine en France au XVIIIE siècle" (Paris, 1910) written by Henri Cordier impressed him. He observed on his trip in west Asia and Egypt the renaissances of China, west Asia and Europe. He asserted that three renaissances had occurred: in west Asia, led by Saracens who revived the cultures centered on Syria. China was affected by that renaissance leading to a renaissance in Song dynasty. Then Europe experienced the most mature Renaissance in Italy initially. This theory caused a heated discussion in academia. Combining this theory with history of Eurasia, he developed the theory of historical stage division mentioned by his teacher, making him one of the earliest historians to erect a global perspective on historical studies. His doctrines became the first generation of the Kyoto school.
