= Dietloff Kapp =

German modern pentathlete

Personal information
- Born: 10 May 1925 Cologne, Germany
- Died: October 1986 (aged 61)

Sport
- Sport: Modern pentathlon

Dietloff Kapp (10 May 1925 – October 1986) was a German modern pentathlete. He competed at the 1952 Summer Olympics.
