= Eduardo de Medeiros =

Brazilian modern pentathlete (1923–2022)

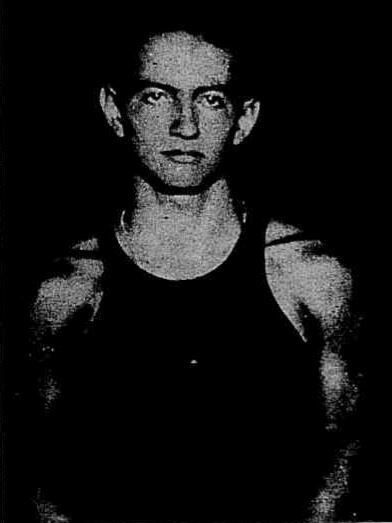
- Eduardo de Medeiros

Personal information
- Full name: Eduardo Leal de Medeiros
- Born: 23 April 1923 Niterói, Rio de Janeiro, Brazil
- Died: 20 May 2002 (aged 79) São Paulo, São Paulo, Brazil

Sport
- Sport: Modern pentathlon

Eduardo de Medeiros (23 April 1923 – 20 May 2002) was a Brazilian modern pentathlete. He competed at the 1952 Summer Olympics.

De Medeiros died in São Paulo on 20 May 2002, at the age of 79.
