= Ricardo Durão =

Portuguese modern pentathlete (1928–2021)

Personal information
- Full name: Ricardo Fernando Durão
- Born: 13 June 1928
- Died: 22 January 2021 (aged 92)

Sport
- Sport: Modern pentathlon

Ricardo Fernandes Durão (13 June 1928 – 22 January 2021) was a Portuguese modern pentathlete. He competed at the 1952 Summer Olympics.
