= Leon Lumsdaine =

British modern pentathlete (1923–1966)

Personal information
- Born: 31 January 1923 Shanghai, China
- Died: 29 March 1966 (aged 43) Sainte-Lucie-de-Doncaster, Québec, Canada

Sport
- Sport: Modern pentathlon

Leon Lumsdaine (31 January 1923 – 29 March 1966) was a British modern pentathlete. He competed at the 1952 Summer Olympics.
