= David Romero (pentathlete) =

Mexican modern pentathlete (1929–2011)

Personal information
- Full name: David Romero Vargas
- Born: 1 November 1929
- Died: 10 February 2011 (aged 81)

Sport
- Sport: Modern pentathlon

David Romero (1 November 1929 – 10 February 2011) was a Mexican modern pentathlete. He competed at the 1952 and 1956 Summer Olympics.
