= Alfonso Marotta =

Italian modern pentathlete (1923–1982)

Personal information
- Born: 2 August 1923 Avellino, Italy
- Died: 16 May 1982 (aged 58)

Sport
- Sport: Modern pentathlon

Alfonso Marotta (2 August 1923 – 16 May 1982) was an Italian modern pentathlete. He competed at the 1952 Summer Olympics.
