= Modern pentathlon at the 1952 Summer Olympics =

Men's modern pentathlon at the Games of the XV Olympiad
- Venue: Hämeenlinna
- Dates: July 21–25, 1952
- No. of events: 2
- Competitors: 51 from 19 nations

At the 1952 Summer Olympics in Helsinki, two events in modern pentathlon were contested. For the first time, a team event was part of the Olympic program.

== Medalists ==
Event	Gold	Silver	Bronze
Individual	Lars Hall; Sweden	Gábor Benedek; Hungary	István Szondy; Hungary
Team	Hungary; Gábor Benedek; Aladár Kovácsi; István Szondy	Sweden; Lars Hall; Thorsten Lindqvist; Claes Egnell	Finland; Olavi Mannonen; Lauri Vilkko; Olavi Rokka

== Medal table ==
Rank	Nation	Gold	Silver	Bronze	Total
1	Hungary	1	1	1	3
2	Sweden	1	1	0	2
3	Finland	0	0	1	1
Totals (3 entries)		2	2	2	6

== Participating nations ==
A total of 51 athletes from 19 nations competed at the Helsinki Games:

- Argentina (3)
- Australia (1)
- Belgium (1)
- Brazil (3)
- Chile (3)
- Finland (3)
- France (3)
- Germany (3)
- Great Britain (3)
- Hungary (3)
- Italy (3)
- Mexico (3)
- Portugal (3)
- South Africa (1)
- Soviet Union (3)
- Sweden (3)
- Switzerland (3)
- United States (3)
- Uruguay (3)
