= Berthold Slupik =

German modern pentathlete (1928–1992)

Personal information
- Born: 31 July 1928
- Died: 5 March 1992 (aged 63)

Sport
- Sport: Modern pentathlon

Berthold Slupik (31 July 1928 – 5 March 1992) was a German modern pentathlete. He competed at the 1952 Summer Olympics.
