= John Hewitt (pentathlete) =

British modern pentathlete

Personal information
- Full name: John Alfred Hewitt
- Born: 6 January 1925 Kent, England
- Died: 6 January 2011 (aged 86)

Sport
- Sport: Modern pentathlon

Captain John Alfred Hewitt (6 January 1925 – 6 January 2011) was a British modern pentathlete. He competed at the 1952 Summer Olympics.

Hewitt was the son of Alfred James Hewitt, who was then serving in the Royal Navy. Becoming an officer in the Royal Marines, in 1956 Hewitt married Shirley Stamp, daughter of a London dental surgeon living in Devon. She operated the Exeter and District Riding School. Their son is James Hewitt, former Major in the Life Guards and media personality, known for his relationship with Diana, Princess of Wales. James' twin sister is Caroline; they also have a sister, Syra, elder by 18 months. In 1974, Hewitt was organizing pony-trekking holidays in Devon.
