= Eric Marques =

Brazilian modern pentathlete

Personal information
- Born: 24 April 1919
- Died: 22 June 1976 (aged 57)

Sport
- Sport: Modern pentathlon

Eric Marques (24 April 1919 – 22 June 1976) was a Brazilian modern pentathlete. He competed at the 1951 Pan American Games and the 1952 Summer Olympics.
