= Aleksandr Dekhayev =

Soviet modern pentathlete (born 1924)

Personal information
- Full name: Aleksandr Alekseyevich Dekhayev
- Born: 16 October 1924

Sport
- Sport: Modern pentathlon

Aleksandr Dekhayev (born 16 October 1924) is a Soviet modern pentathlete. He competed at the 1952 Summer Olympics.
