= Adolf Harder =

German modern pentathlete (1927–2003)

Personal information
- Born: 11 February 1927
- Died: 5 April 2003 (aged 76)

Sport
- Sport: Modern pentathlon

Adolf Harder (11 February 1927 – 5 April 2003) was a German modern pentathlete. He competed at the 1952 Summer Olympics.
