= Torsten Lindqvist =

Swedish modern pentathlete

Thorsten Lindqvist
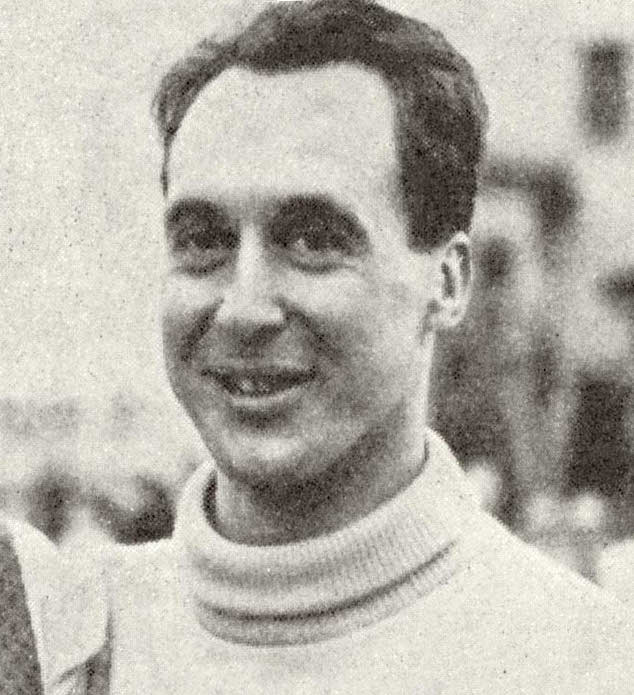

Personal information
- Born: 2 December 1925 Säffle, Sweden
- Died: 3 November 2002 (aged 76) Uppsala, Sweden

Sport
- Sport: Modern pentathlon
- Club: SSIF, Stockholm
Medal record
Representing Sweden
Olympic Games
Silver medal – second place	1952 Helsinki	Team
World championships
Gold medal – first place	1951 Helsingborg	Team
Gold medal – first place	1953 Santo Domingo	Team
Bronze medal – third place	1951 Helsingborg	Individual

Torsten Ivan Lindqvist (2 December 1925 – 3 November 2002) was a Swedish modern pentathlete who competed in the 1952 Summer Olympics. He finished ninth individually and won a silver medal with the Swedish team. At the world championships he won team gold medals in 1951 and 1953 and an individual bronze in 1951.

After retiring from competitions Lindqvist became an internationally renowned nuclear physicist.
