= António Jonet =

Portuguese modern pentathlete

Personal information
- Full name: António Lopes Jonet
- Born: 30 June 1927
- Died: 21 September 2007 (aged 80)

Sport
- Sport: Modern pentathlon

António Jonet (30 June 1927 – 21 September 2007) was a Portuguese modern pentathlete. He competed at the 1952 Summer Olympics.
