= Santiago Armada =

Cuban artist

Santiago Rafael Armada Suárez or Santiago Armada (20 June 1937, Palma Soriano – 29 May 1995, Havana) was a Cuban artist and designer. He was also known by the nickname Chago.

== Biography ==
Armada entered the Havana Professional School of Business in 1954 where he studied bookkeeping. In May 1958 he created the cartoon character Julito 26, which later appeared in the El Cubano Libre newspaper. During the revolutionary insurrection he stood in the Sierra Maestra, while very young, and formed part of the José Martí Column 1.

Armada composed several songs that were aired on the then newly opened Radio Rebelde station.

In 1961 he co-founded the Union of Writers and Artists of Cuba (known by its acronym UNEAC) and in 1962 became a member of the Union of Journalists of Cuba (UPEC). He is considered, together with Servando Cabrera Moreno, Raul Martinez, Antonia Eiriz and Humberto Peña, as a participant in the visual artistic avant garde of the 60's decade.

== Work ==
Armada published his first humorous comics in the Mercurio and Ahora magazines. While taking part in the 1950s revolutionary movement against Batista in the Sierra Maestra, he began working on the editorial staff of the clandestine newspaper, El Cubano Libre. He was responsible for the humour supplement of the newspaper. It was here that he first revealed the humorous comic character Julito 26 (in May, 1958). to the readership of El Cubano Libre. Later, after the 1959 revolution, Julito 26 began to be published in the Revolución magazine.

In 1960 he founded the magazine, El Pitirre, which produced weekly humour. He also corroborated on other periodicals such as Bohemia and Palante. In 1961 he created another cartoon figure, Salomón for La Revolución newspaper.

Throughout his career Armada also served as the artistic director within the Ediciones R and Ediciones Granma publishing houses, in addition to working as a designer with the Granma newspaper. He had been a founding member of this periodical in 1965.

His depictions were widely published in Cuba and internationally. Some of the international papers which used Armada's work include Opus International of France, Il Caffé of Italy, Sucesos of Mexico, Liberation and The New York Times in the U.S.A. among others. Armada also held individual and collective exhibitions within Cuba as well as throughout the world.

=== Individual exhibitions ===
- 1975 - Humor Nosis, Ninguno, Otro (Manitowoc Humour, None, Another); Granma (newspaper), Havana.
- 2000 - Sa lo món; Center for the development of Visual Arts, Havana.
- 2000 - Chago; The Drawings Center, New York.

=== Collective exhibitions ===
- 1959 - Dibujos humorísticos; (Humorous Drawings) Sociedad Cultural Nuestro Tiempo (Our Time Cultural Society); Havana, Cuba.
- 2002 - The Royal College of Art Fair; London, United Kingdom.
