= Pavel Rakityansky =

Russian modern pentathlete

Personal information
- Born: 1928 Krasnodar, Russian SFSR, Soviet Union
- Died: 1992 (aged 63–64)

Sport
- Sport: Modern pentathlon

Pavel Rakityansky (1928 – 1992) was a Russian modern pentathlete. He competed at the 1952 Summer Olympics.
