= Jervis Percy =

British modern pentathlete (1928–2026)

Personal information
- Born: 21 July 1928 Alexandria, Egypt
- Died: 7 January 2026 (aged 97) Cork, County Cork, Ireland

Sport
- Sport: Modern pentathlon

Jervis Joscelyn Percy (21 July 1928 – 7 January 2026) was a British modern pentathlete. He competed at the 1952 Summer Olympics. He died in Cork, Ireland on 7 January 2026, at the age of 97.
