= Gábor Benedek =

Hungarian modern pentathlete

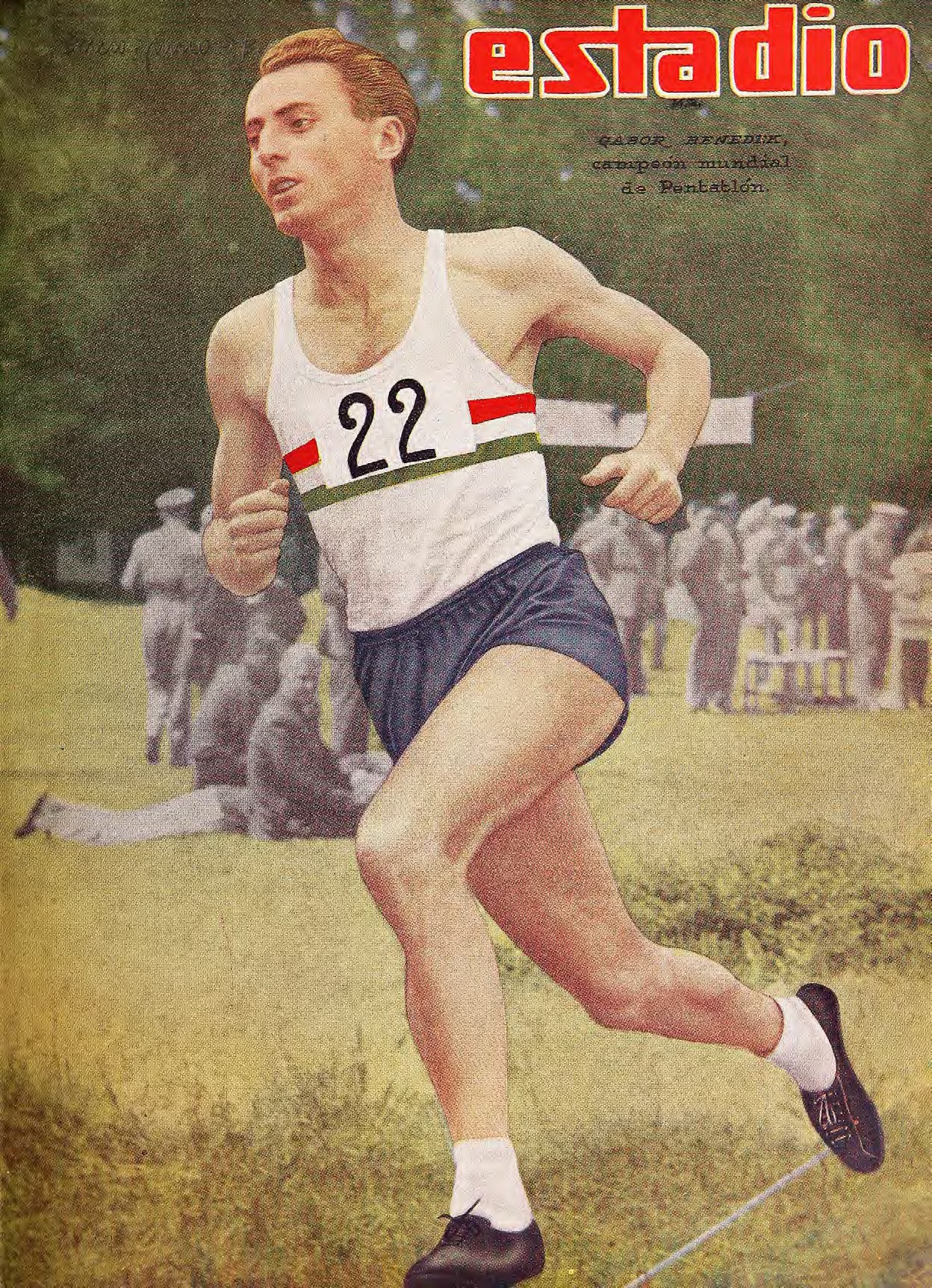

Personal information
- Born: 23 March 1927 (age 99) Tiszaföldvár, Hungary

Sport
- Sport: Modern pentathlon
Medal record
Men's modern pentathlon
Representing Hungary
Olympic Games
Gold medal – first place	1952 Helsinki	Team
Silver medal – second place	1952 Helsinki	Individual
World Championships
Gold medal – first place	1953 Santo Domingo	Individual
Gold medal – first place	1954 Budapest	Team

Gábor Benedek (born 23 March 1927) is a Hungarian modern pentathlete and Olympic champion.

Benedek won a gold medal in the modern pentathlon at the 1952 Summer Olympics in Helsinki with the Hungarian team. He became the first Hungarian world champion in modern pentathlon.

After the death of Ágnes Keleti, Benedek became the oldest living Hungarian Olympic champion. On 23 November 2025, following the death of Nikita Simonyan, Benedek became the oldest living Olympic champion.
