= Olavi Rokka =

Finnish modern pentathlete (1925–2011)

Personal information
- Born: 9 August 1925 Viipuri, Finland
- Died: 21 December 2011 (aged 86) Hyvinkää, Finland

Sport
- Sport: Modern pentathlon
Medal record
Men's Modern pentathlon
Representing Finland
Olympic Games
Bronze medal – third place	1952 Helsinki	Team

Olavi Rokka (9 August 1925 – 21 December 2011) was a Finnish modern pentathlete. He won a bronze medal in the team modern pentathlete event at the 1952 Summer Olympics.
