= Bertrand de Montaudoüin =

French modern pentathlete

Personal information
- Born: 29 March 1924
- Died: 26 March 2004 (aged 79)

Sport
- Sport: Modern pentathlon

Bertrand de Montaudoüin (29 March 1924 – 26 March 2004) was a French modern pentathlete. He competed at the 1952 Summer Olympics.
