= Ruben Orozco =

Uruguayan modern pentathlete (1917–1995)

Personal information
- Full name: Rubén Guillermo Orozco Rodríguez
- Born: 30 May 1917 Fray Bentos, Uruguay
- Died: 31 May 1995 (aged 78) Montevideo, Uruguay

Sport
- Sport: Modern pentathlon

Ruben Orozco (30 May 1917 – 31 May 1995) was a Uruguayan modern pentathlete. He competed at the 1948 Summer Olympics.
