= Christian Palant =

French modern pentathlete

Personal information
- Born: 21 September 1921 Paris, France
- Died: 18 November 2001 (aged 80) Paris, France

Sport
- Sport: Modern pentathlon

Christian Jean Gérard Palant (21 September 1921 – 18 November 2001) was a French modern pentathlete. He competed at the 1948 and 1952 Summer Olympics. He died in Paris in November 2001 at the age of 80.
