= Aloysio Borges =

Brazilian modern pentathlete (1917–1996)

Personal information
- Born: 18 December 1917
- Died: 27 November 1996 (aged 78)

Sport
- Sport: Modern pentathlon

Aloysio Borges (18 December 1917 – 27 November 1996) was a Brazilian modern pentathlete and épée fencer. He competed at the 1948 and 1952 Summer Olympics.

== Career ==
Aloysio Borges represented Brazil at the 1948 Olympic Games, coming 38th as a team and 21st as an individual.

In 1952, at the Helsinki Olympic Games, Aloysio Borges competed in the modern pentathlon, placing 6th in the team.

He won the team silver medal in the pentathlon at the 1951 Pan American Games in Buenos Aires. He repeated his position at the 1963 Pan American Games in São Paulo, but in fencing.

He was a teacher at the Army Parachute School between 1963 and 1965.
