= André Lacroix (pentathlete) =

French modern pentathlete (1921–2016)

Personal information
- Full name: André Jean Maurice Lacroix
- Born: 24 September 1921 Genouillé, France
- Died: 15 August 2016 (aged 94) Vaux-sur-Mer, France

Sport
- Sport: Modern pentathlon

André Jean Maurice Lacroix (24 September 1921 – 15 August 2016) was a French modern pentathlete. He competed at the 1948 and 1952 Summer Olympics. Lacroix died in Vaux-sur-Mer on 15 August 2016, at the age of 94.
