= Alberto Ortiz =

Uruguayan modern pentathlete (1923–1990)

Personal information
- Full name: Alberto Ortiz Alvárez
- Born: 14 May 1923 Montevideo, Uruguay
- Died: 13 February 1990 (aged 66) Montevideo, Uruguay

Sport
- Sport: Modern pentathlon

Alberto Ortiz Álvarez (14 May 1923 – 13 February 1990) was a Uruguayan modern pentathlete. He competed at the 1948 and 1952 Summer Olympics. Ortiz died in Montevideo on 13 February 1990, at the age of 66.
