= Thad McArthur =

American modern pentathlete (born 1928)

Personal information
- Born: November 23, 1928 (age 97) Seattle, Washington, U.S.

Sport
- Sport: Modern pentathlon

Thad McArthur (born November 23, 1928) is an American modern pentathlete. He competed at the 1952 Summer Olympics.
