= Nilo Floody =

Chilean modern pentathlete (1921–2013)

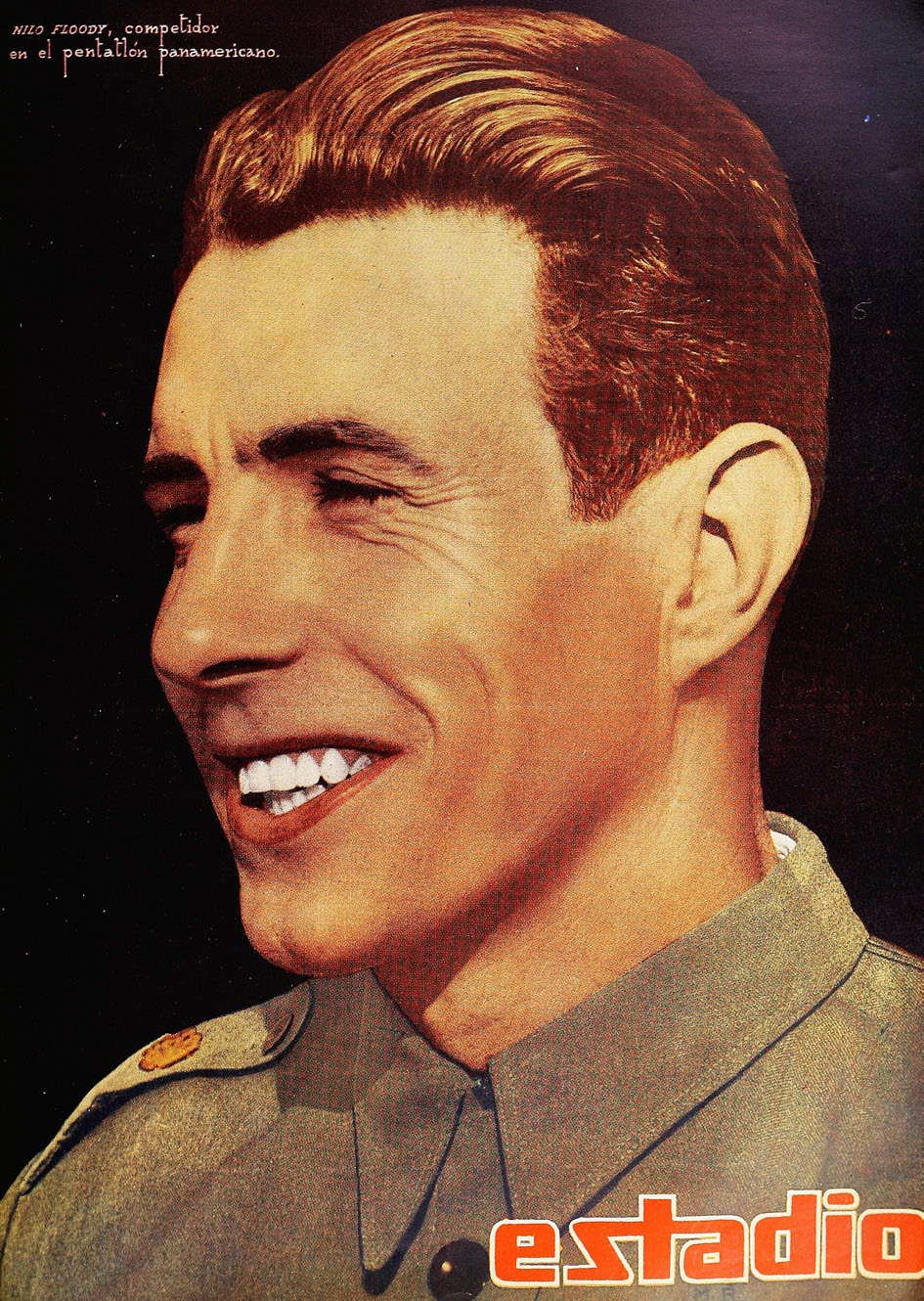

Personal information
- Born: 16 July 1921 Fundo Chacay, IX region, La Araucania, Chile
- Died: 2 July 2013 (aged 91) Santiago, Chile

Sport
- Sport: Modern pentathlon

Nilo Floody Buxton (16 July 1921 – 2 July 2013) was a Chilean modern pentathlete. He competed at the 1948, 1952 and 1956 Summer Olympics.

In 1974 he was named Intendant of Bío Bío Region and in 1977 of Magallanes y la Antártica Chilena Region.
