= Carlos Velázquez (pentathlete) =

Argentine modern pentathlete (born 1925)

Personal information
- Full name: Carlos Alberto Velázquez
- Born: 14 July 1925

Sport
- Sport: Modern pentathlon

Carlos Alberto Velázquez (born 14 July 1925) is an Argentine modern pentathlete. He competed at the 1952 Summer Olympics.
