= Giulio Palmonella =

Italian modern pentathlete (1919–1982)

Personal information
- Born: 14 April 1919 Civitavecchia, Italy
- Died: 20 April 1982 (aged 63) Civitavecchia, Italy

Sport
- Sport: Modern pentathlon

Giulio Palmonella (14 March 1919 – 20 April 1982) was an Italian modern pentathlete. He competed at the 1948 and 1952 Summer Olympics.
