= Duilio Brignetti =

Italian modern pentathlete (1926–1993)

Personal information
- Born: 17 August 1926 Marciana Marina, Italy
- Died: 7 February 1993 (aged 66)

Sport
- Sport: Modern pentathlon

Duilio Brignetti (17 August 1926 – 7 February 1993) was an Italian modern pentathlete. He competed at the 1948 and 1952 Summer Olympics.
