= Lauri Vilkko =

Finnish modern pentathlete

Personal information
- Born: 13 August 1925 Rautjärvi, Finland
- Died: 13 October 2017 (aged 92)

Sport
- Sport: Modern pentathlon
Medal record
Men's modern pentathlon
Representing Finland
Olympic Games
Bronze medal – third place	1952 Helsinki	Team

Lauri Tapani Vilkko (13 August 1925 – 13 October 2017) was a Finnish modern pentathlete who competed in the 1948 Summer Olympics and in the 1952 Summer Olympics. He won a bronze medal in the team event in 1952. He was a military officer who retired as a colonel in 1985 having worked as a chief of the topography department in the Finnish Army.
