= Hernán Fuentes =

Chilean modern pentathlete (1918–1999)

Personal information
- Full name: José Hernán Fuentes Besoain Jr.
- Born: 26 February 1918 Melipilla, Chile
- Died: 7 January 1999 (aged 80) Santiago, Chile

Sport
- Sport: Modern pentathlon

José Hernán Fuentes Besoain Jr. (26 February 1918 – 7 January 1999) was a Chilean modern pentathlete. He competed at the 1948 and 1952 Summer Olympics.
