= Werner Schmid (pentathlete) =

Swiss modern pentathlete

Personal information
- Born: 25 November 1919
- Died: 2005 (aged 85–86)

Sport
- Sport: Modern pentathlon

Werner Schmid (25 November 1919 – 2005) was a Swiss modern pentathlete. He competed at the 1948 and 1952 Summer Olympics.
