= István Szondy =

Hungarian modern pentathlete

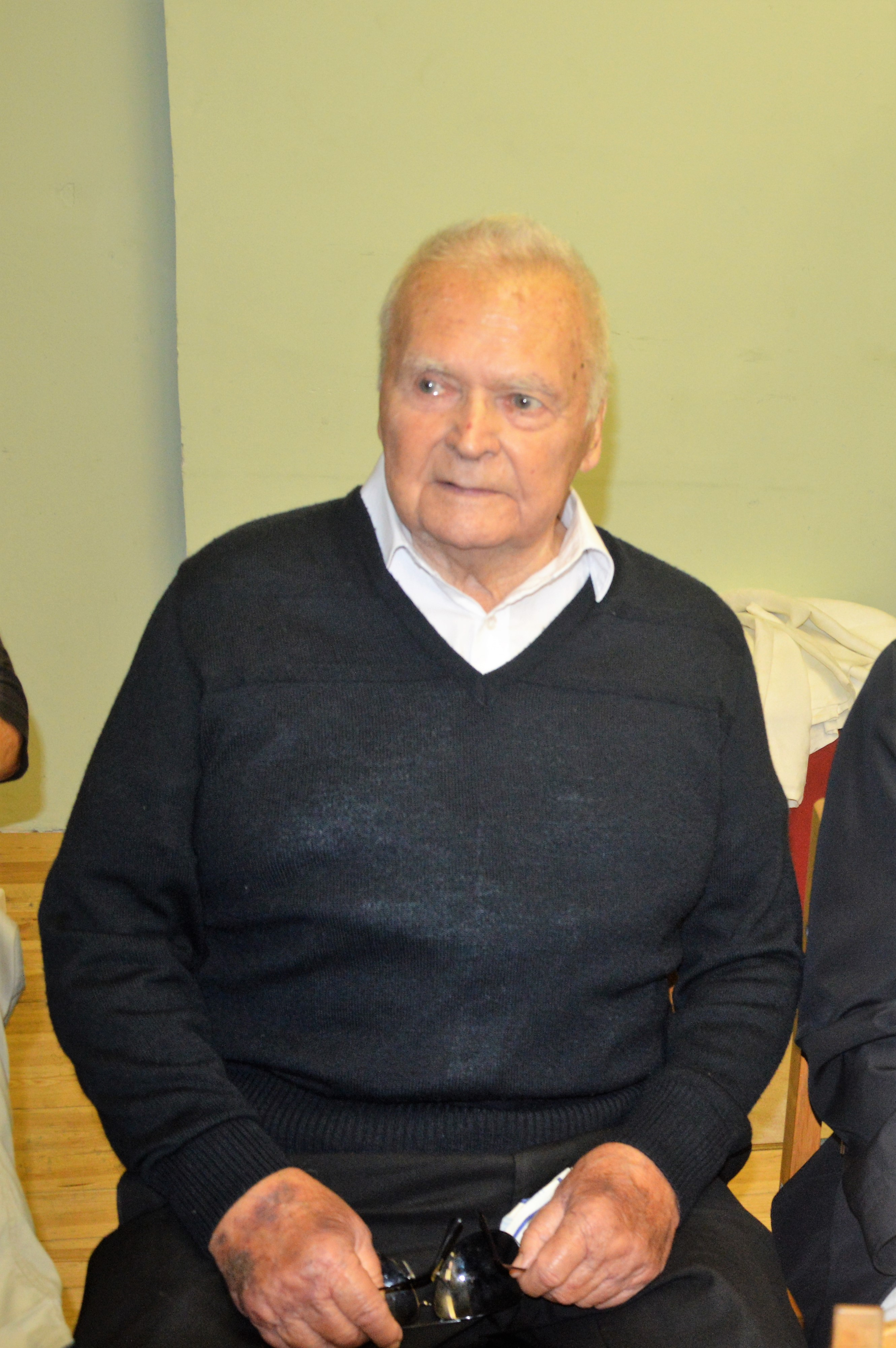

Personal information
- Born: 29 December 1925 Berettyóújfalu, Hungary
- Died: 31 May 2017 (aged 91) Budapest, Hungary

Sport
- Sport: Modern pentathlon, horse rider
Medal record
Men's modern pentathlon
Representing Hungary
Men's Olympic Games
Gold medal – first place	1952 Helsinki	Team
Bronze medal – third place	1952 Helsinki	Individual
World Championships
Gold medal – first place	1954 Budapest	Team
Gold medal – first place	1955 Zürich	Team
Silver medal – second place	1953 Santo Domingo	Individual
Bronze medal – third place	1954 Budapest	Individual

István Szondy (29 December 1925 – 31 May 2017) was a Hungarian modern pentathlete, horse rider and Olympic champion who competed at the 1948, 1952 and the 1956 Summer Olympics.

== Olympics ==
Szondy received a gold medal in the team modern pentathlon event at the 1952 Summer Olympics in Helsinki and a bronze in the individual event.
