= Lars Hall =

Swedish modern pentathlete

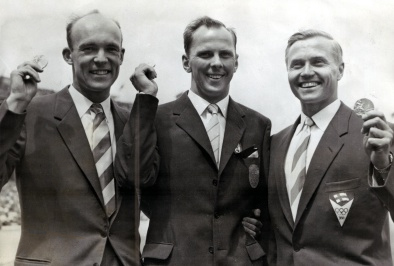
- Lars Hall (middle) at the 1956 Summer Olympics

Personal information
- Nationality: Swedish
- Born: 30 April 1927 Karlskrona, Sweden
- Died: 26 April 1991 (aged 63) Täby, Sweden

Sport
- Sport: Modern pentathlon
- Club: Flottans IF, Karlskrona; Flottans IF, Stockholm
Medal record
Representing Sweden
Olympic Games
Gold medal – first place	1952 Helsinki	Individual
Gold medal – first place	1956 Melbourne	Individual
Silver medal – second place	1952 Helsinki	Team
World Championships
Gold medal – first place	1949 Stockholm	team
Gold medal – first place	1950 Bern	Individual
Gold medal – first place	1950 Bern	Team
Gold medal – first place	1951 Helsingborg	Individual
Gold medal – first place	1951 Helsingborg	Team
Gold medal – first place	1953 Chile	Team

Lars Göran Ivar Hall (30 April 1927 – 26 April 1991) was a Swedish modern pentathlete who competed at the 1952 and 1956 Summer Olympics. He won the individual event at both Games and finished second with the Swedish team in 1952. In 1952 he became the first civilian Olympic champion in modern pentathlete.

For his achievements, Hall was awarded the Svenska Dagbladet Gold Medal in 1956 (shared with cross-country skier Sixten Jernberg).

Preceded by Sigvard Ericsson	Svenska Dagbladet Gold Medal with Sixten Jernberg; 1956	Succeeded by Dan Waern
