= Claes Egnell =

Swedish sport shooter and modern pentathlete

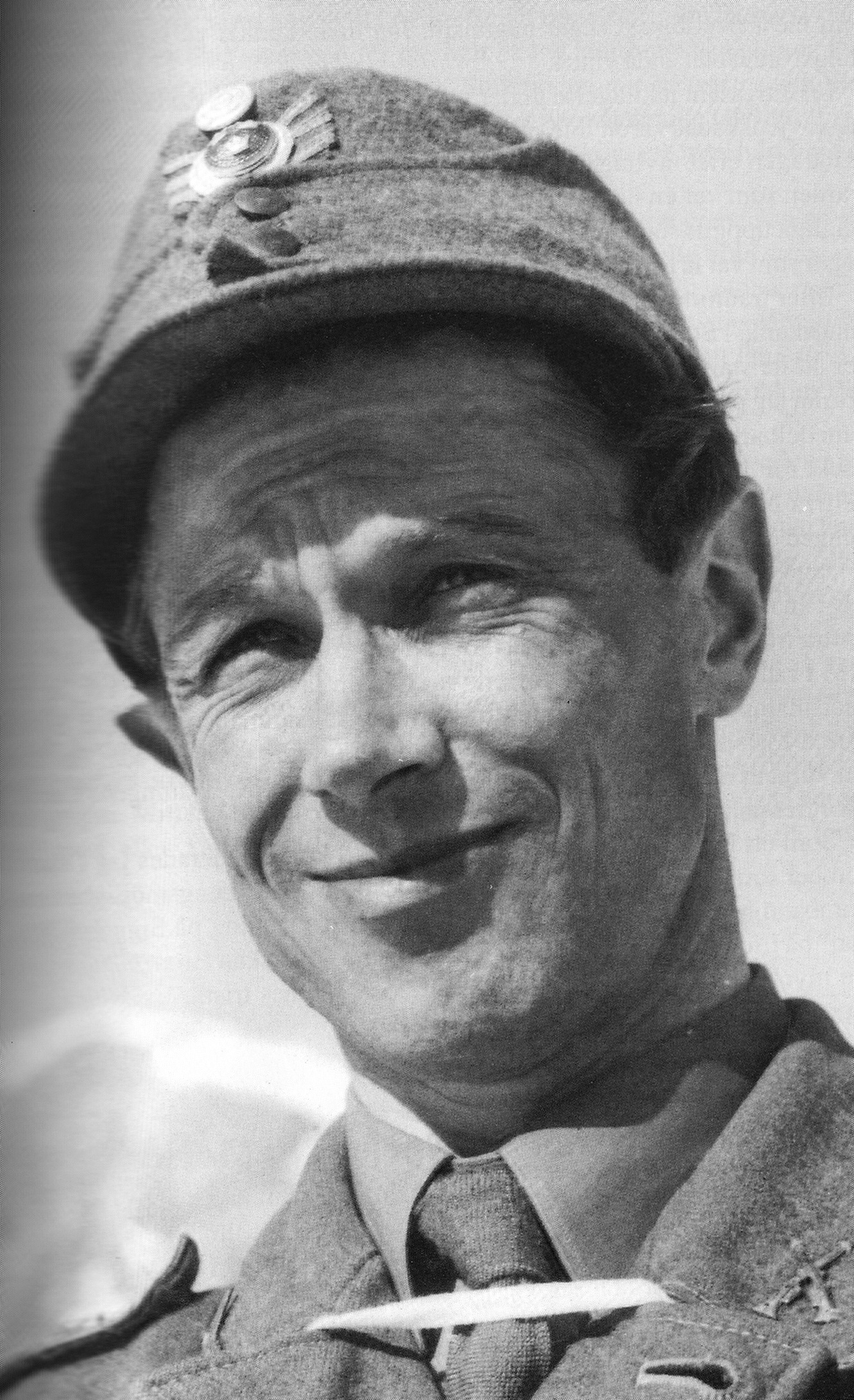

Personal information
- Nationality: Swedish
- Born: 29 January 1916 Örebro, Sweden
- Died: 15 January 2012 (aged 95) Falun, Sweden

Sport
- Country: Sweden
- Sport: Modern pentathlon
- Club: I3 IF, Örebro
Medal record
Representing Sweden
Olympic Games
Silver medal – second place	1952 Helsinki	Team

Claes Robert Herman Vidarsson Egnell (29 January 1916 – 15 January 2012) was a Swedish sport shooter and modern pentathlete, who competed at the 1948 and 1952 Summer Olympics. In 1948 he finished 24th in the 25 m rapid-fire pistol event. In 1952 he won a silver medal in modern pentathlon with the Swedish team, and placed 11th individually. He also took part in the 1948 Winter Olympics, in the winter pentathlon, which was held as a demonstration sport. He suffered a leg fracture in the downhill skiing event and had to withdraw.

Egnell also competed nationally in fencing, cross-country skiing, tennis and horse riding. In 1945 he received the Svenska Dagbladet Gold Medal for winning two Swedish modern pentathlon championships. He served as Secretary-General of the FIS Nordic World Ski Championships 1974 and was a guest of honor at the modern pentathlon World Cup final in Uppsala in 2005.
