= Modern pentathlon at the 1960 Summer Olympics – Men's individual =

Men's modern pentathlon at the Games of the XVII Olympiad
- Dates: August 26–31

Medalists
1st place, gold medalist(s)		Ferenc Németh; Hungary
2nd place, silver medalist(s)		Imre Nagy; Hungary
3rd place, bronze medalist(s)		Bob Beck; United States

The men's modern pentathlon multi-sport event at the 1960 Olympic Games took place on August 26–31.

== Format ==
Riding: The riding event was held on August 26 at Passo Corese. It was contested as an equestrian cross-country steeplechase. Competitors are paired with horses in a random draw 20 minutes before the event.

Fencing: The fencing event was held on August 27 at the Palazzo dei Congressi. It was contested as a single touch épée round-robin tournament.

Shooting: The shooting event was held on August 28 at Umberto I Shooting Range. It was contested as 20 shot 10 metre air pistol.

Swimming: The swimming event was held on August 30 at the Swimming Stadium. It was contested as a 300 metre freestyle swim.

Running: The running event was held on August 31 at the Acqua Santa Golf Club Course. It was contested as a 4000 metre cross-country race.

== Results ==
=== Final standings ===
Rank	Name	Nationality	Riding	Fencing	Shooting	Swimming	Running	Total	Notes
1st place, gold medalist(s)	Ferenc Németh	Hungary	1,009	977	880	990	1,168	5,024	
2nd place, silver medalist(s)	Imre Nagy	Hungary	1,048	1,000	840	935	1,165	4,988	
3rd place, bronze medalist(s)	Bob Beck	United States	1,039	977	940	1,010	1,015	4,981	
4	András Balczó	Hungary	1,037	885	760	1,075	1,216	4,973	
5	Igor Novikov	Soviet Union	982	839	860	1,035	1,246	4,962	
6	Nikolay Tatarinov	Soviet Union	1,138	747	820	885	1,168	4,758	
7	Stanisław Przybylski	Poland	1,111	747	860	815	1,198	4,731	
8	Jack Daniels	United States	1,024	793	900	1,015	985	4,717	
9	Kurt Lindeman	Finland	1,027	839	900	830	1,117	4,713	
10	Hanno Selg	Soviet Union	967	839	780	925	1,177	4,688	
11	Patrick Harvey	Great Britain	1,057	655	920	900	1,147	4,679	
12	Berndt Katter	Finland	866	931	900	970	961	4,628	
13	Luis Ribera	Argentina	1,153	770	880	955	865	4,623	
14	Kazimierz Paszkiewicz	Poland	1,075	563	840	1,010	1,108	4,596	
15	Per-Erik Ritzén	Sweden	1,117	724	840	825	1,084	4,590	
16	Eero Lohi	Finland	1,036	770	780	905	1,093	4,584	
17	Antonio Almada	Mexico	1,129	931	840	975	691	4,566	
18	George Lambert	United States	1,165	678	740	975	982	4,540	
19	Erhard Minder	Switzerland	1,141	793	820	740	1,033	4,527	
20	Kazimierz Mazur	Poland	1,129	586	960	710	1,126	4,511	
21	Sture Ericson	Sweden	937	885	640	890	1,114	4,466	
22	Sergio Escobedo	Mexico	1,237	793	1,000	690	742	4,462	
23	Adriano Facchini	Italy	1,096	632	780	955	949	4,412	
24	Donald Cobley	Great Britain	1,036	655	720	865	1,096	4,372	
25	Peter Lichtner-Hoyer	Austria	1,123	655	800	750	1,015	4,343	
26	Peter Little	Great Britain	967	632	760	905	1,030	4,294	
27	Justo Botelho	Brazil	718	724	840	940	1,048	4,270	
28	Wolfgang Gödicke	United Team of Germany	588	747	860	950	1,117	4,262	
29	Gaetano Scala	Italy	940	839	800	865	817	4,261	
30	Björn Thofelt	Sweden	1,024	793	880	870	643	4,210	
31	Neville Sayers	Australia	1,024	632	820	615	1,114	4,205	
32	Wenceslau Malta	Brazil	1,066	586	860	750	919	4,181	
33	Werner Vetterli	Switzerland	896	609	840	910	853	4,108	
34	Hugh Doherty	Australia	958	517	840	875	907	4,097	
35	Kazuhiro Tanaka	Japan	922	517	840	890	916	4,085	
36	Carlos Stricker	Argentina	1,081	448	700	925	817	4,021	
37	Udo Birnbaum	Austria	1,010	793	640	730	832	4,005	
38	Shigeaki Uchino	Japan	571	517	860	845	1,195	3,988	
39	Frank Battig	Austria	949	747	680	700	829	3,905	
40	Raúl Bauza	Argentina	1,135	724	360	960	709	3,888	
41	Giulio Giunta	Italy	662	632	540	965	1,084	3,883	
42	André Bernard	France	877	517	800	800	886	3,880	
43	José Pérez	Mexico	1,027	517	700	960	670	3,874	
44	Joaquín Villalba	Spain	943	494	880	850	700	3,867	
45	Christian Beauvalet	France	1,135	724	540	665	799	3,863	
46	Peter Macken	Australia	976	517	440	855	1,048	3,836	
47	Benny Schmidt	Denmark	994	747	580	540	949	3,810	
48	Dietrich Krickow	United Team of Germany	706	701	620	855	898	3,780	
49	Rolf Weber	Switzerland	941	609	620	625	952	3,747	
50	José Wilson	Brazil	433	448	800	920	919	3,520	
51	Fernando Irayzoz	Spain	1,031	425	680	670	580	3,386	
52	Okkie van Greunen	South Africa	755	310	680	810	823	3,378	
53	Étienne Jalenques	France	968	632	580	725	432	3,337	
54	Arsène Pint	Belgium	1,129	425	300	565	823	3,242	
55	Ralf Berckhan	United Team of Germany	979	471	0	905	706	3,061	
56	Lakdar Bouzid	Tunisia	0	218	620	680	838	2,356	
57	Habib Ben Azzabi	Tunisia	DQ	356	340	450	532	1,678	
58	Ahmed Ennachi	Tunisia	DQ	287	380	130	388	1,185	
59	Mohamed Ben Checkroun	Morocco	671	-	-	-	-	-	DNF
60	Naji El-Mekki	Morocco	DNF	-	-	-	-	-	DNF

Key: DNF = did not finish
