= Modern pentathlon at the 1960 Summer Olympics – Men's team =

Men's modern pentathlon at the Games of the XVII Olympiad
- Venue: Passo Corese (riding); Palazzo dei Congressi (fencing); Umberto I Shooting Range (shooting); Stadio Olimpico del Nuoto (swimming); Acqua Santa Golf Club Course (running)
- Dates: August 26, 1960 (riding); August 27, 1960 (fencing); August 28, 1960 (shooting); August 30, 1960 (swimming); August 31, 1960 (running
- Competitors: 51 from 17 nations

Medalists
1st place, gold medalist(s)		Ferenc Németh; Imre Nagy; András Balczó; Hungary
2nd place, silver medalist(s)		Igor Novikov; Nikolay Tatarinov; Hanno Selg; Soviet Union
3rd place, bronze medalist(s)		Bob Beck; Jack Daniels; George Lambert; United States

The modern pentathlon men's team event of the 1960 Summer Olympics was held on August 26, through to August 31. The modern pentathlon was composed of five events, show jumping, fencing, shooting, swimming, and running, with the individual points each competitor receives counting towards their nations final tally for each event, and ultimately the competition. The results that the competitors received in the individual modern pentathlon event would cross-over to produce the scores in the team event. 51 competitors participated in the event representing 17 nations.

== Format ==
The Riding event commenced on August 26 at Passo Corese. The event was an equestrian cross-country mix steeplechase race. 20 minutes before the event, the competitors were paired with their horses that they would ride through a random draw. The points the competitors received from the event were given based on the time it took to complete the course. The competitors would receive a penalty for whenever they knocked over one of the obstacles, these penalties would be subtracted from the riders final total, giving them their 'adjusted points'.

The Fencing event commenced on August 27 at the Palazzo dei Congressi. The event was contested as a single touch épée round-robin style tournament. Each contestant would receive points for every bout they won, their points would accumulate for every win.

The Shooting event commenced on August 28 at Umberto I Shooting Range. The event was contested as a 200 shot, rapid fire pistol contest. The points for each competitor in the event was given as a result of the score they received from their targets. If a competitor didn't receive a high enough score, they wouldn't gain any points from the contest.

The Swimming event commenced on August 30 at the Stadio Olimpico del Nuoto. The event was contested as a 300-metre freestyle swim. The points the competitors received were based on the time it took them to complete the race.

The Running event commenced on August 31 at the Acqua Santa Golf Club Course. The event was contested as a 4,000 metre cross country race. The points the competitors received were based on the time it took them to complete the race.

== Results ==
=== Final standings ===
Rank	Nation	Athletes	Riding	Fencing	Shooting	Swimming	Running	Total
1st place, gold medalist(s)	Hungary	Ferenc Németh	1,009	977	880	990	1,168	5,024
1st place, gold medalist(s)	Hungary	Imre Nagy	1,048	1,000	840	935	1,165	4,988
1st place, gold medalist(s)	Hungary	András Balczó	1,037	885	760	1,075	1,216	4,973
1st place, gold medalist(s)	Hungary	Total	3,094	2,740	2,480	3,000	3549	14,863
2nd place, silver medalist(s)	Soviet Union	Igor Novikov	982	839	860	1,035	1,246	4,962
2nd place, silver medalist(s)	Soviet Union	Nikolay Tatarinov	1,138	747	820	885	1,168	4,758
2nd place, silver medalist(s)	Soviet Union	Hanno Selg	967	839	780	925	1,177	4,688
2nd place, silver medalist(s)	Soviet Union	Total	3,087	2,326	2,460	2,845	3,591	14,309
3rd place, bronze medalist(s)	United States	Bob Beck	1,039	977	940	1,010	1,015	4,981
3rd place, bronze medalist(s)	United States	Jack Daniels	1,024	793	900	1,015	985	4,717
3rd place, bronze medalist(s)	United States	George Lambert	1,165	678	740	975	982	4,540
3rd place, bronze medalist(s)	United States	Total	3,228	2,402	2,580	3,000	2,982	14,192
4	Finland	Kurt Lindeman	1,027	839	900	830	1,117	4,713
4	Finland	Berndt Katter	866	931	900	970	961	4,628
4	Finland	Eero Lohi	1,036	770	780	905	1,093	4,584
4	Finland	Total	2,929	2,480	2,580	2,705	3,171	13,865
5	Poland	Stanisław Przybylski	1,111	747	860	815	1,198	4,731
5	Poland	Kazimierz Paszkiewicz	1,075	563	840	1,010	1,180	4,596
5	Poland	Kazimierz Mazur	1,129	586	960	710	1,126	4,511
5	Poland	Total	3,315	1,804	2,660	2,535	3,432	13,746
6	Sweden	Per-Erik Ritzén	1,117	724	840	825	1,084	4,590
6	Sweden	Sture Ericson	937	885	640	890	1,114	4,466
6	Sweden	Björn Thofelt	1,024	793	880	870	643	4,210
6	Sweden	Total	3,078	2,352	2,360	2,585	2,841	13,216
7	Great Britain	Patrick Harvey	1,057	655	920	900	1,147	4,679
7	Great Britain	Donald Cobley	1,036	655	720	865	1,096	4,372
7	Great Britain	Peter Little	967	632	760	905	1,030	4,294
7	Great Britain	Total	3,060	1,700	2,400	2,670	3,273	13,103
8	Mexico	Antonio Almada	1,129	931	840	975	691	4,566
8	Mexico	Sergio Escobedo	1,237	793	1,000	690	742	4,462
8	Mexico	José Pérez	1,027	517	700	960	670	3,874
8	Mexico	Total	3,393	2,184	2,540	2,625	2,103	12,845
9	Italy	Adriano Facchini	1,096	632	780	955	949	4,412
9	Italy	Gaetano Scala	940	839	800	865	817	4,261
9	Italy	Giulio Giunta	662	632	540	965	1,084	3,883
9	Italy	Total	2,698	1,948	2,120	2,785	2,850	12,401
10	Argentina	Luis Ribera	1,153	770	880	955	865	4,623
10	Argentina	Carlos Stricker	1,081	448	700	975	817	4,021
10	Argentina	Raúl Bauza	1,135	724	360	960	709	3,888
10	Argentina	Total	3,369	1,804	1,940	2,890	2,391	12,394
11	Switzerland	Erhard Minder	1,141	793	820	740	1,033	4,527
11	Switzerland	Werner Vetterli	896	609	840	910	853	4,108
11	Switzerland	Rolf Weber	941	609	620	625	952	3,747
11	Switzerland	Total	2,978	1,830	2,280	2,275	2,838	12,201
12	Austria	Peter Lichtner-Höyer	1,123	655	800	750	1,015	4,343
12	Austria	Udo Birnbaum	1,010	793	640	730	832	4,005
12	Austria	Frank Battig	949	747	680	700	829	3,905
12	Austria	Total	3,082	2,048	2,120	2,180	2,676	12,106
13	Brazil	Justo Botelho	718	724	840	940	1,048	4,270
13	Brazil	Wenceslau Malta	1,066	586	860	750	919	4,181
13	Brazil	José Wilson	433	448	800	920	919	3,520
13	Brazil	Total	2,217	1,724	2,500	2,610	2,886	11,937
14	Australia	Neville Sayers	1,024	632	820	615	1,114	4,205
14	Australia	Hugh Doherty	958	517	840	875	907	4,097
14	Australia	Peter Macken	976	517	440	855	1,048	3,836
14	Australia	Total	2,958	1,440	2,100	2,345	3,069	11,912
15	France	André Bernard	877	517	800	800	886	3,880
15	France	Christian Beauvalet	1,135	724	540	665	799	3,863
15	France	Étienne Jalenques	968	632	580	725	472	3,377
15	France	Total	2,980	1,756	1,920	2,190	2,157	11,003
16	United Team of Germany	Wolfgang Gödicke	588	747	860	950	1,117	4,262
16	United Team of Germany	Dietrich Krickow	706	701	620	855	898	3,780
16	United Team of Germany	Ralf Berckhan	979	471	0	905	706	3,061
16	United Team of Germany	Total	2,273	1,756	1,480	2,710	2,721	10,940
17	Tunisia	Lakdar Bouzid	0	218	620	680	838	2,356
17	Tunisia	Habib Ben Azzabi	0	356	340	450	532	1,678
17	Tunisia	Ahmed Ennachi	0	287	380	130	388	1,185
17	Tunisia	Total	0	768	1,340	1,260	1,758	5,126
