= Modern pentathlon at the 1960 Summer Olympics =

Men's modern pentathlon at the Games of the XVII Olympiad
- Dates: August 26–31, 1960
- Competitors: 60 from 23 nations

Medalists
1st place, gold medalist(s)		Ferenc Németh	Hungary
2nd place, silver medalist(s)		Imre Nagy	Hungary
3rd place, bronze medalist(s)		Robert Beck	United States

At the 1960 Summer Olympics in Rome, two events in modern pentathlon were contested.

== Medal summary ==
Event	Gold	Silver	Bronze
Individual	Ferenc Németh; Hungary	Imre Nagy; Hungary	Robert Beck; United States
Team	Hungary; Imre Nagy; András Balczó; Ferenc Németh	Soviet Union; Nikolai Tatarinov; Hanno Selg; Igor Novikov	United States; Robert Beck; Jack Daniels; George Lambert

== Medal table ==
Rank	Nation	Gold	Silver	Bronze	Total
1	Hungary	2	1	0	3
2	Soviet Union	0	1	0	1
3	United States	0	0	2	2
Totals (3 entries)		2	2	2	6

== Participating nations ==
A total of 60 athletes from 23 nations competed at the Rome Games:

- Argentina (3)
- Australia (3)
- Austria (3)
- Belgium (1)
- Brazil (3)
- Denmark (1)
- Finland (3)
- France (3)
- United Team of Germany (3)
- Great Britain (3)
- Hungary (3)
- Italy (3)
- Japan (2)
- Mexico (3)
- Morocco (2)
- Poland (3)
- South Africa (1)
- Soviet Union (3)
- Spain (2)
- Sweden (3)
- Switzerland (3)
- Tunisia (3)
- United States (3)

== Results ==
=== Individual ===
1	Ferenc Németh	Hungary
2	Imre Nagy	Hungary
3	Bob Beck	United States
4	András Balczó	Hungary
5	Igor Novikov	Soviet Union
6	Nikolay Tatarinov	Soviet Union
7	Stanisław Przybylski	Poland
8	Jack Daniels	United States
9	Kurt Lindeman	Finland
10	Hanno Selg	Soviet Union
11	Patrick Harvey	Great Britain
12	Berndt Katter	Finland
13	Luis Ribera	Argentina
14	Kazimierz Paszkiewicz	Poland
15	Per-Erik Ritzén	Sweden
16	Eero Lohi	Finland
17	Antonio Almada	Mexico
18	George Lambert	United States
19	Erhard Minder	Switzerland
20	Kazimierz Mazur	Poland
21	Sture Ericson	Sweden
22	Sergio Escobedo	Mexico
23	Adriano Facchini	Italy
24	Donald Cobley	Great Britain
25	Peter Lichtner-Hoyer	Austria
26	Peter Little	Great Britain
27	Justo Botelho	Brazil
28	Wolfgang Gödicke	United Team of Germany
29	Gaetano Scala	Italy
30	Björn Thofelt	Sweden
31	Neville Sayers	Australia
32	Wenceslau Malta	Brazil
33	Werner Vetterli	Switzerland
34	Hugh Doherty	Australia
35	Kazuhiro Tanaka	Japan
36	Carlos Stricker	Argentina
37	Udo Birnbaum	Austria
38	Shigeaki Uchino	Japan
39	Frank Battig	Austria
40	Raúl Bauza	Argentina
41	Giulio Giunta	Italy
42	André Bernard	France
43	José Pérez	Mexico
44	Joaquín Villalba	Spain
45	Christian Beauvalet	France
46	Peter Macken	Australia
47	Benny Schmidt	Denmark
48	Dieter Krickow	United Team of Germany
49	Rolf Weber	Switzerland
50	José Wilson	Brazil
51	Fernando Irayzoz	Spain
53	Étienne Jalenques	France
54	Arsène Pint	Belgium
55	Ralf Berckhan	United Team of Germany
56	Lakdar Bouzid	Tunisia
57	Habib Ben Azzabi	Tunisia
58	Ahmed Ennachi	Tunisia
AC	Mohamed Ben Checkroun	Morocco
AC	Naji El-Mekki	Morocco

=== Team ===
1	Hungary
2	Soviet Union
3	United States
4	Finland
5	Poland
6	Sweden
7	Great Britain
8	Mexico
9	Italy
10	Argentina
11	Switzerland
12	Austria
13	Brazil
14	Australia
15	France
16	United Team of Germany
17	Tunisia

== Tunisian athletes ==
The modern pentathletes from Tunisia were notable for their poor performances and attempts at cheating. In the swimming portion, one competitor, Ahmed Ennachi, nearly drowned. In the shooting portion, an athlete was ejected for firing too closely to the judges, and in the equestrian portion, all three athletes fell off their horses. In the fencing portion, the Tunisians attempted to pass off their strongest fencer as each of the three athletes, using his mask to conceal his identity. The ruse failed and the Tunisians were disqualified from the fencing portion. Altogether in the team competition, Tunisia received 5,126 points, which was around 5,000 points below the next team and almost 10,000 behind the winners.
