= List of Pan American Games medalists in modern pentathlon =

This is the complete list of Pan American Games medalists in modern pentathlon from 1951 to 2023.

== Events ==
=== Men's individual ===
Games	Gold	Silver	Bronze
1951	Eric Marques; Brazil	James Thompson; United States	Enrique Rettberg; Argentina
1955	José Pérez; Mexico	Edgar O'Hair; United States	David Romero; Mexico
1959	Wenceslau Malta; Brazil	George Lambert; United States	Leslie Bleamaster; United States
1963	Robert Beck; United States	Richard Stull; United States	James Moore; United States
1987	Rob Stull; United States	Barry Kennedy; Canada	Harvey Cain; United States
1999	Velizar Iliev; United States	Brett Weatherbie; United States	Sergio Salazar; Mexico
2003	Vakhtang Iagorashvili; United States	Chad Senior; United States	Sergio Salazar; Mexico
2007	Eli Bremer; United States	Yaniel Velázquez; Cuba	Joshua Riker-Fox; Canada
2011	Óscar Soto; Mexico	Andrei Gheorghe; Guatemala	Esteban Bustos; Chile
2015	Charles Fernández; Guatemala	Ismael Hernández; Mexico	Nathan Schrimsher; United States
2019	Charles Fernández; Guatemala	Esteban Bustos; Chile	Sergio Villamayor; United States
2023	Emiliano Hernández; Mexico	Duilio Carrillo; Mexico	Andrés Torres; Ecuador

=== Men's team ===
Games	Gold	Silver	Bronze
1951	United States (USA); James Thompson; Guy Troy; Gall Wilson	Brazil (BRA); Eric Tinoco; Aloysio Borges; Eduardo de Medeiros	Argentina (ARG); Carlos Velázquez; Enrique Rettberg; Antonio Rodríguez
1955	Mexico (MEX); José Pérez; David Romero; Antonio Almada	United States (USA); Edgar O'Hair; William Andre; Alan Wadsworth	Chile (CHI); Luis Gallo; Gerardo Cortes; Hernán Fuentes
1959	United States (USA); George Lambert; Leslie Bleamaster; Robert Miller	Brazil (BRA); Wenceslau Malta; José Wilson; Brenio Vignoli	Mexico (MEX); Antonio Almada; Sergio Escobedo; José Pérez
1963	United States (USA); Robert Beck; Richard Stoll; James Moore	Brazil (BRA); José Wilson; Justo Botelho; Nilo da Silva	Mexico (MEX); Sergio Escobedo; José Pérez; Antonio Almada

=== Men's relay ===
Games	Gold	Silver	Bronze
2019	Mexico; Duilio Carrillo; José Melchor Silva	United States; Brendan Anderson; Amro El Geziry	Argentina; Sergio Villamayor; Emmanuel Zapata
2023	Mexico; Emiliano Hernández; Duilio Carrillo	United States; Tristen Bell; Brendan Anderson	Ecuador; Bayardo Naranjo; Andrés Torres

=== Women's individual ===
Games	Gold	Silver	Bronze
1999	Mary Beth Larsen; United States	Rocío Arias; Mexico	Kara Grant; Canada
2003	Anita Allen; United States	Samantha Harvey; Brazil	Mary Beth Iagorashvili; United States
2007	Yane Marques; Brazil	Monica Pinette; Canada	Michelle Kelly; United States
2011	Margaux Isaksen; United States	Yane Marques; Brazil	Tamara Vega; Mexico
2015	Yane Marques; Brazil	Tamara Vega; Mexico	Mayan Oliver; Mexico
2019	Mariana Arceo; Mexico	Samantha Achterberg; United States	Leydi Moya; Cuba
2023	Mayan Oliver; Mexico	Catherine Oliver; Mexico	Sophia Hernández; Independent Athletes Team

=== Women's relay ===
Games	Gold	Silver	Bronze
2019	United States; Samantha Achterberg; Jessica Davis	Cuba; Elani Camara Rodriguez; Leydi Moya	Brazil; Isabela Abreu; Priscila Oliveira
2023	Mexico; Catherine Oliver; Mayan Oliver	Independent Athletes Team; Paula Valencia; Sophia Hernández	Canada; Kelly Fitzsimmons; Devan Wiebe

=== Mixed relay ===
Games	Gold	Silver	Bronze
2019	United States; Amro El Geziry; Isabella Isaksen	Cuba; Jose Ricardo Figueroa; Leydi Moya	Guatemala; María Diéguez; Charles Fernández
2023	Mexico; Tamara Vega; Manuel Padilla	Ecuador; Sol Naranjo; Andrés Torres	United States; Jessica Davis; Brendan Anderson
