= List of uncompetitive athletes =

List of athletes notable for uncompetitive performances

This is a list of notably uncompetitive athletes, or individual sportspeople who gained significant media or sporting attention due to their performance being dramatically worse than those of other competitors. Notable results of this nature have often been due to inadequate preparation or an athlete entering a discipline different from what they usually compete in.

== List ==
Athlete	Nationality	Sport	Event	Description
Lakdar Bouzid; Habib Ben Azzabi; Ahmed Ennachi	Tunisia	Modern pentathlon	1960 Summer Olympics	Placed last far behind other competitors in the individual and team events. The team became notable both for their poor performances, which included one athlete almost drowning in the swimming portion, and attempts at cheating in the fencing portion.
Maurice Flitcroft	United Kingdom	Golf	1976 Open Championship	Scored 121, the worst score ever recorded in the Open Championship. Flitcroft had very little experience playing golf but entered the qualifying round under an assumed name and lied about being a professional.
Eddie Edwards	United Kingdom	Ski jumping	1988 Winter Olympics	Placed last far behind other competitors in the men's normal and large hill events. He subsequently achieved worldwide fame and was nicknamed "Eddie the Eagle". Edwards had only begun ski jumping in 1986 after switching from alpine skiing.
Philip Boit	Kenya	Cross Country Skiing	1998 Winter Olympics	Placed 92nd and last in the 10 km classic race. He became a trailblazer for Africans in the Winter Olympics.
Ali Dia	Senegal	Football	1996–97 FA Premier League	Played one game for Southampton F.C. as a substitute, but was substituted himself after 53 minutes after a noticeably poor performance. It later emerged that Dia had falsely convinced Southampton manager Graeme Souness that he was the cousin of famed player George Weah and a successful Senegal international, when in actuality he had never played top-level football.
Eric Moussambani	Equatorial Guinea	Swimming	2000 Summer Olympics	Finished last in the men's 100 meter freestyle with a time of 1:52.72, over a minute behind the fastest time. Moussambani had never before swum in an Olympic size pool. The result earned him the nickname "Eric the Eel".
Paula Barila Bolopa	Equatorial Guinea	Swimming	2000 Summer Olympics	Finished last in the women's 50 meter freestyle with a time of 1:03.97, almost 40 seconds behind the fastest time. A teammate of Eric Moussambani, Bolopa stated after the race that she had never swum 50 meters before.
Trevor Misipeka	American Samoa	Athletics	2001 World Championships in Athletics	Finished last in the 100 meters with a time of 14.28. Misipeka was a shot putter who ran the 100 meters due to a last-minute rule change.
Sogelau Tuvalu	American Samoa	Athletics	2011 World Championships in Athletics	Finished last in the 100 meters with a time of 15.66. Tuvalu was trained as a shot putter but did not qualify for that event.
Hamadou Djibo Issaka	Niger	Rowing	2012 Summer Olympics	Finished hundreds of meters behind competitors in each of his races. Issaka took up rowing three months before the Olympics.
Vanessa Vanakorn	Thailand	Alpine skiing	2014 Winter Olympics	Finished last in the giant slalom event 50.10 seconds behind the winner over two runs and 11.35 seconds behind the second-last placed finisher. Vanakorn, better known as the British violinist Vanessa-Mae, qualified in events organized at the last minute by her management to earn her the required points, which were later annulled due to irregularities.
Adrian Solano	Venezuela	Cross-country skiing	2017 FIS Nordic World Ski Championships	Finished last by a wide margin in the cross-country skiing freestyle sprint, and failed to finish the qualification for the 15km classical, both times experiencing significant difficulties completing the course. Was dubbed by various outlets as the "world's worst skier". Solano had never trained skiing on snow before the event.
Elizabeth Swaney	Hungary	Freestyle skiing	2018 Winter Olympics	Competed in the halfpipe event with runs that contained virtually no tricks. Swaney qualified for the Olympics by going to events and getting ranking points simply for completing races without falling.
Artem Bahmet	Ukraine	Tennis	2019 Men's World Tennis Tour Doha tournament	Lost every single point in a 6–0, 6–0 qualifying round game, with his opponent achieving a rare "golden match". There was evidence that the match had been set up by Russian gamblers.
Nasra Ali Abukar	Somalia	Athletics	2021 Summer World University Games	Finished last in the 100 meters with a time of 21.81. The incident resulted in allegations of nepotism and the suspension of the Somali Athletics Federation chairwoman.
Jolien Boumkwo	Belgium	Athletics	2023 European Athletics Team Championships	Ran the 100 meter hurdles despite being a shot putter to replace an injured teammate. Finished with a time of 32.81, running at a relaxed pace to avoid injury. She nonetheless earned two points for Belgium due to another hurdler being disqualified, and received widespread recognition for her efforts to help the team.
Rachael Gunn	Australia	Breaking	2024 Summer Olympics	Scored zero points in three rounds and became the subject of global attention and ridicule for her routines, which included unorthodox dance moves.
Hajar Abdelkader	Egypt	Tennis	2026 Women's World Tennis Tour Nairobi tournament	Lost 6–0, 6–0 while scoring only three points in the entire game, two of which from her opponent's double faults. Abdelkader told organizers she played at an appropriate level and was accepted as a wildcard, which organizers later said had been a mistake.

== See also ==
- Blowout (sports) – notable uncompetitive results by teams
- Tourist athlete
