= Tunisia at the 1960 Summer Olympics =

- IOC code: TUN
- NOC: Tunisian Olympic Committee

in Rome
- Competitors: 42 (all men) in 7 sports
- Flag bearer: Houcine Cherif Hammouda
- Medals: Gold 0 Silver 0 Bronze 0 Total 0

Summer Olympics appearances (overview)
- 1960; 1964; 1968; 1972; 1976; 1980; 1984; 1988; 1992; 1996; 2000; 2004; 2008; 2012; 2016; 2020; 2024; 2028

Tunisia competed in the Summer Olympic Games for the first time at the 1960 Summer Olympics in Rome, Italy. 42 competitors, all men, took part in 22 events in 7 sports.

== Athletics ==
Men
Track & road events

Athlete	Event	Heat		Quarterfinal		Semifinal		Final	
Athlete	Event	Result	Rank	Result	Rank	Result	Rank	Result	Rank
Khalifa Bahroumi	20 km walk	—N/a						1:47:09.6	27
Mouldi Ben Amor Essalhi	Marathon	—N/a						DNF	
Ahmed Ben Dali Labidi	Marathon	—N/a						2:35:43.2	49
Mohamed Ben Lazhar	20 km walk	—N/a						DSQ	
Mohamed Ben Lazhar	50 km walk	—N/a						5:07:57.4	26
Abdeslem Dargouth	800 m	1:54.87	6	did not advance					
Hédi Dhaoui	Marathon	—N/a						DNF	
Mohamed Gouider	1500 m	3:58.52	12	did not advance					
Brahim Karabi	400 m	52.0	7	did not advance					
Mongi Soussi Zarrouki	400 m hurdles	54.34	6	did not advance					
Naoui Zlassi	20 km walk	—N/a						1:55:21.0	28
Naoui Zlassi	50 km walk	—N/a						DSQ	

Field events

Athlete	Event	Qualification		Final	
Athlete	Event	Distance	Position	Distance	Position
Sylvain Bitan	High jump	NM		did not advance	

== Boxing ==
Men

Athlete	Event	1 Round	2 Round	3 Round	Quarterfinals	Semifinals	Final
Athlete	Event	Opposition Result	Opposition Result	Opposition Result	Opposition Result	Opposition Result	Rank
Tahar Ben Hassen	Bantamweight	BYE	Nicolae Puiu (ROU); L 1-4	did not advance			
Noureddine Dziri	Lightweight	BYE	Harry Lempio (GER); L TKO-3	did not advance			
Azouz Bechir	Light welterweight	BYE	György Pál (HUN); L RSC-1	did not advance			
Omrane Sadok	Welterweight	BYE	Tomislav Kelava (YUG); W RSC-1	Shishman Mitsev (BUL); L 2-3	did not advance		
Mohamed Ben Gandoubi	Middleweight	—N/a	Eamonn McKeon (IRL); L 0-5	did not advance			

== Cycling ==
Four male cyclists represented Tunisia in 1960

Road

Athlete	Event	Time	Rank
Ali Ben Ali	Men's road race	DNF	
Mohamed El-Kemissi	Men's road race	DNF	
Bechir Mardassi	Men's road race	DNF	
Mohamed Touati	Men's road race	DNF	
Ali Ben Ali; Mohamed El-Kemissi; Bechir Mardassi; Mohamed Touati	Team time trial	2:36:05.54	27

== Fencing ==
Four fencers represented Tunisia in 1960.

Men's foil

- Norbert Brami
- Jean Khayat
- Raoul Barouch

Men's épée

- Ali Annabi
- Raoul Barouch
- Norbert Brami

Men's sabre

- Raoul Barouch
- Jean Khayat
- Ali Annabi

== Football ==
=== Group C ===
Team	Pld	W	D	L	GF	GA	GD	Pts
Denmark	3	3	0	0	8	4	+4	6
Argentina	3	2	0	1	6	4	+2	4
Poland	3	1	0	2	7	5	+2	2
Tunisia	3	0	0	3	3	11	−8	0

August 26, 1960
13:00

Poland	6–1	Tunisia
Pohl 7', 40', 42', 84', 89'; Hachorek 67'	Report	Kerrit 3'

Rome
Attendance: 3.000
Referee: Lo Bello (ITA)

August 29, 1960
12:00

Argentina	2–1	Tunisia
Oleniak 15', 82'	Report	Kerrit 25'

Pescara
Referee: Zsolt (HUN)

September 1, 1960
12:00

Denmark	3–1	Tunisia
F. Nielsen 24'; H. Nielsen 27', 88'	Report	Cherif 48'

L'Aquila
Attendance: 2.000
Referee: Campanati (ITA)

== Modern pentathlon ==
Three male pentathletes represented Tunisia in 1960.

Athlete	Event	Riding (show jumping)	Fencing (épée one touch)	Shooting (10 m air pistol)	Swimming (200 m freestyle)	Running (3000 m)	Total points	Final rank
Athlete	Event	Points	Points	Points	Points	Points	Total points	Final rank
Lakdar Bouzid	Men's	0	218	620	680	838	2356	56
Habib Ben Azzabi	Men's	DQ	356	340	450	532	1678	57
Ahmed Ennachi	Men's	DQ	287	380	130	388	1185	58
Lakdar Bouzid; Habib Ben Azzabi; Ahmed Ennachi	Team	0	861	1340	1260	1758	5219	17

== Shooting ==
Two shooters represented Tunisia in 1960.

Men

Athlete	Event	Qualification		Final	
Athlete	Event	Score	Rank	Score	Rank
Moustafa Chellouf	Men's 50 metre rifle prone	350	41	did not advance	
Habib Dallagi	Men's 50 metre rifle prone	353	41	did not advance	
