= List of Summer Olympics venues: 1–9 to A =

For the Summer Olympics, there were two venues listed that started with 1–9 while there were 31 venues that started with the letter A.

== 1–9 ==
Venue	Games	Sports	Capacity	Ref.
7th arrondissement of Paris	1900 Paris	Equestrian	Not listed	
160th Regiment State Armory	1932 Los Angeles	Fencing, Modern pentathlon (fencing)	1,800	

== A ==
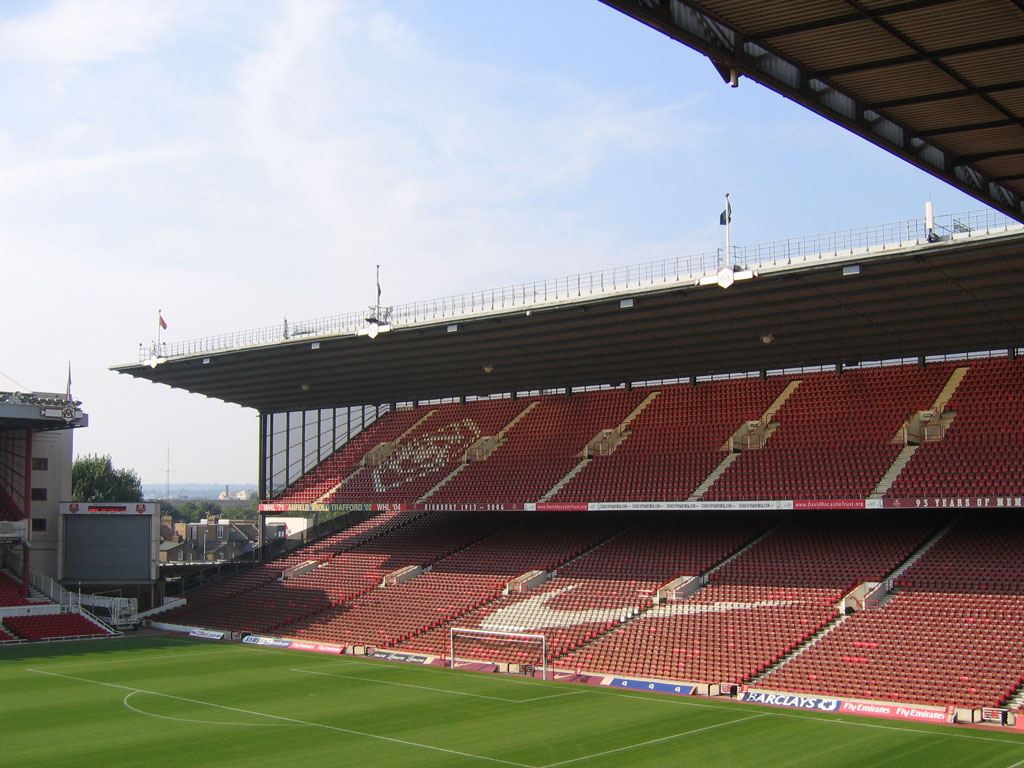
Arsenal Stadium hosted football preliminaries for the 1948 Summer Olympics in London.

Venue	Games	Sports	Capacity	Ref.
A-17 highway	1992 Barcelona	Cycling (road team time trial)	105,000	
Acqua Santa Golf Club Course	1960 Rome	Modern pentathlon (running)	Not listed.	
Agios Kosmas Olympic Sailing Centre	2004 Athens	Sailing	8,000	
Agustín Melgar Olympic Velodrome	1968 Mexico City	Cycling (track)	3,000	
Albert Gersten Pavilion	1984 Los Angeles	Weightlifting	4,156	
Aldershot	1948 London	Equestrian (jumping) Modern pentathlon (riding, fencing, swimming)	Not listed.	
Alexander Memorial Coliseum	1996 Atlanta	Boxing	10,000	
All England Lawn Tennis and Croquet Club	1908 London	Rackets, Tennis	Not listed.	
All England Lawn Tennis and Croquet Club	2012 London	Tennis	30,000	
Amersfoort	1920 Amsterdam	Modern pentathlon (riding)	Not listed.	
Amsterdam	1928 Amsterdam	Cycling (road)	Not listed.	
Anaheim Convention Center	1984 Los Angeles	Wrestling	7,200	
Anaheim Convention Center	2028 Los Angeles	Volleyball	6,000	
Ano Liosia Olympic Hall	2004 Athens	Judo, Wrestling	10,000	
Antwerp	1920 Antwerp	Cycling (road)	Not listed.	
Antwerp Zoo	1920 Antwerp	Boxing, Wrestling	Not listed.	
Aquatics Centre	2012 London	Diving, Modern pentathlon (swimming), Swimming, Synchronized swimming	17,500	
Arch of Constantine	1960 Rome	Athletics (marathon - finish line)	Not listed.	
Archery Field	1992 Barcelona	Archery	Not listed.	
Arena Corinthians	2016 Rio de Janeiro	Football	48,234	
Arena da Amazônia	2016 Rio de Janeiro	Football	40,549	
Arena México	1968 Mexico City	Boxing	16,236	
Arsenal Stadium	1948 London	Football	73,000	
Artesia Freeway	1984 Los Angeles	Cycling (road team time trial)	Not listed.	
Asaka Nezu Park	1964 Tokyo	Modern pentathlon (riding)	1,300	
Asaka Shooting Range	1964 Tokyo	Modern pentathlon (shooting), Shooting (pistol/ rifle)	1,200	
Asaka Shooting Range	2020 Tokyo	Shooting	3,200	
Athens Lawn Tennis Club	1896 Athens	Tennis	Not listed.	
Athens Olympic Aquatic Centre	2004 Athens	Diving, Swimming, Synchronized swimming, Water polo	23,000 (total of three pools)	
Athens Olympic Tennis Centre	2004 Athens	Tennis	15,000 (all courts)	
Athens Olympic Velodrome	2004 Athens	Cycling (track)	3,300	
Atlanta Beach	1996 Atlanta	Volleyball (beach)	12,600	
Atlanta–Fulton County Stadium	1996 Atlanta	Baseball	54,000	
Avándaro Golf Club	1968 Mexico City	Equestrian (eventing)	Not listed.	
Avus Motor Road	1936 Berlin	Athletics (marathon, 50 km walk), Cycling (road)	Not listed.	
