= Thofelt =

Thofelt is a Swedish surname. Notable people with the surname include:

- Björn Thofelt (born 1935), Swedish modern pentathlete
- Sven Thofelt (1904–1993), Swedish modern pentathlete and fencer, father of Björn
