= Michelle Kelly =

Michelle Kelly may refer to

- Michelle Kelly (marine scientist), also known as Michelle Kelly-Borges and Kelly-Borges
- Michelle Kelly (skeleton racer) (born 1974), Canadian Olympic skeleton racer
- Michelle Kelly (pentathlete) (born c. 1978), American modern pentathlete

== See also ==
- Laura Michelle Kelly (born 1981), English actress and singer
