= André Bernard =

André Bernard may refer to:

- André Bernard (cyclist) (1930–2015), French cyclist
- André Bernard (pentathlete) (1935–2026), French Olympic modern pentathlete
- André Antoine Bernard (1751–1818), French lawyer and revolutionary
- Andrée Bernard (born 1966), English actress
