= Modern pentathlon at the 2007 Pan American Games =

Below are the final standings of the Modern Pentathlon at the 2007 Pan American Games. The competition was held at Deodoro Sports Complex on July 23 and July 24.

== Men ==
#	Athlete (NOC)	Shooting	Fencing	Swimming	Riding	Running	Total
1st place, gold medalist(s)	(United States) Eli Bremer	168 (952 pts)	25-15 (940 pts)	2:05.63 (1296 pts)	70.07 (1144 pts)	9:48.50 (1048 pts)	5380
2nd place, silver medalist(s)	(Cuba) Yaniel Velazquez	182 (1120 pts)	24-16 (920 pts)	2:12.80 (1208 pts)	92.82 (1024 pts)	9:42.55 (1072 pts)	5344
3rd place, bronze medalist(s)	(Canada) Joshua Riker-Fox	177 (1060 pts)	28-12 (1000 pts)	2:14.37 (1188 pts)	77.63 (1080 pts)	10:00.25 (1000 pts)	5328
4	(Mexico) Andres Garcia	168 (952 pts)	22-18 (880 pts)	2:11.18 (1228 pts)	81.43 (1120 pts)	9:40.31 (1080 pts)	5260
5	(Chile) Cristian Bustos	172 (1000 pts)	22-18 (880 pts)	2:19.33 (1128 pts)	79.20 (1136 pts)	9:38.05 (1088 pts)	5232
6	(United States) Denis Bowsher	182 (120 pts)	11-29 (660 pts)	2:08.95 (1256 pts)	68.46 (1144 pts)	9:55.01 (1020 pts)	5200
7	(Mexico) Oscar Soto	182 (1120 pts)	22-18 (880 pts)	2:14.70 (1184 pts)	73.17 (916 pts)	9:40.25 (1080 pts)	5180
8	(Brazil) Daniel Santos	161 (868 pts)	30-10 (1040 pts)	2:13.75 (1196 pts)	71.14 (1144 pts)	10:27.55 (892 pts)	5140
9	(Guatemala) Nikkos Papadopolo	168 (952 pts)	18-22 (800 pts)	2:14.01 (1192 pts)	70.50 (1200 pts)	10:12.16 (952 pts)	5096
10	(Panama) Jose Guitian	158 (832 pts)	22-18 (880 pts)	2:25.47 (1056 pts)	72.33 (1172 pts)	9:26.70 (1136 pts)	5076
11	(Brazil) Wagner Romao	168 (952 pts)	20-20 (840 pts)	2:12.21 (1216 pts)	74.03 (1084 pts)	10:04.00 (984 pts)	5076
12	(Chile) Gonzalo Tisi	153 (772 pts)	24-16 (920 pts)	2:20.37 (1116 pts)	69.17 (1172 pts)	9:52.95 (1032 pts)	5012
13	(Canada) Tik Maynard	157 (820 pts)	24-16 (896 pts)	2:19.83 (1124 pts)	62.38 (1144 pts)	9:57.95 (1012 pts)	4996
14	(Dominican Republic) Jesus Abreu	158 (832 pts)	28-12 (1000 pts)	2:16.90 (1160 pts)	72.49 (1200 pts)	11:15.01 (700 pts)	4892
15	(Argentina) Emmanuel Zapata	154 (784 pts)	11-29 (660 pts)	2:14.69 (1184 pts)	72.41 (1172 pts)	10:05.70 (980 pts)	4780
16	(Dominican Republic) Julio Benjamin	167 (940 pts)	22-18 (880 pts)	2:09.64 (1248 pts)	88.27 (940 pts)	11:17.76 (692 pts)	4700
17	(Venezuela) Eduardo Salas	145 (676 pts)	10-30 (640 pts)	2:16.63 (1164 pts)	60.36 (1060 pts)	9:41.36 (1076 pts)	4616
18	(Argentina) Armando Acosta	169 (964 pts)	20-20 (840 pts)	2:35.31 (940 pts)	94.36 (888 pts)	11:00.00 (760 pts)	4392
19	(Uruguay) Luis Siri	156 (808 pts)	11-29 (660 pts)	2:26.38 (1044 pts)	97.62 (1004 pts)	11:24.00 (664 pts)	4180
20	(Uruguay) Luis Benavides	177 (1060 pts)	8-32 (600 pts)	2:39.12 (892 pts)	73.57 (1144 pts)	12:15.45 (460 pts)	4156
21	(Guatemala) Otto Perez	183 (1132 pts)	14-26 (720 pts)	2:14.39 (1188 pts)	DNF (0 pts)	11:16.95 (696 pts)	3736

== Women ==
#	Athlete	Shooting	Fencing	Swimming	Riding	Running	Total
1st place, gold medalist(s)	(Brazil) Yane Marques	174 (1024 pts)	24-2 (1216 pts)	2:14.72 (1304 pts)	74.42 (1032 pts)	11:43.01 (908 pts)	5484
2nd place, silver medalist(s)	(Canada) Monica Pinette	176 (1048 pts)	17-9 (964 pts)	2:30.85 (1112 pts)	68.59 (1116 pts)	11:08.75 (1048 pts)	5288
3rd place, bronze medalist(s)	(United States) Michelle Kelly	170 (976 pts)	12-14 (784 pts)	2:26.75 (1160 pts)	68.25 (1144 pts)	10:33.55 (1188 pts)	5252
4	(Canada) Kara Grant	176 (1048 pts)	11-15 (748 pts)	2:40.98 (992 pts)	77.53 (1192 pts)	10:33.38 (1188 pts)	5168
5	(Guatemala) Rita Sanz-Agero	172 (1000 pts)	15-11 (892 pts)	2:33.11 (1084 pts)	69.32 (1172 pts)	11:17.10 (1012 pts)	5160
6	(Mexico) Marlene Sanchez	169 (964 pts)	16-10 (928 pts)	2:30.47 (1116 pts)	68.04 (1060 pts)	11:14.67 (1024 pts)	5092
7	(Cuba) Katia Rodriguez	162 (880 pts)	14-12 (856 pts)	2:24.89 (1184 pts)	75.66 (1088 pts)	11:26.25 (976 pts)	4984
8	(Brazil) Larissa Lellys	153 (772 pts)	13-13 (820 pts)	2:24.01 (1192 pts)	64.85 (1116 pts)	11:22.38 (992 pts)	4892
9	(Guatemala) Marines Garza	164 (904 pts)	11-15 (748 pts)	2:29.22 (1132 pts)	73.09 (1088 pts)	11:39.65 (924 pts)	4796
10	(Cuba) Suaima Garcia	179 (1084 pts)	12-14 (784 pts)	2:26.50 (1164 pts)	DNF (512 pts)	11:43.16 (908 pts)	4452
11	(United States) Sheila Taormina	161 (868 pts)	12-14 (784 pts)	2:07.36 (1392 pts)	DNF (100 pts)	11:28.18 (968 pts)	4112
12	(Argentina) Gabriela Raute	175 (1036 pts)	3-23 (460 pts)	3:32.10 (376 pts)	72.40 (1088 pts)	12:12.20 (792 pts)	3752
13	(Argentina) Pamela Zapata	154 (784 pts)	12-14 (784 pts)	2:31.01 (1108 pts)	DNF (240 pts)	12:49.91 (644 pts)	3560
14	(Dominican Republic) Ana Luisa Gil Beras	166 (928 pts)	8-18 (640 pts)	2:41.00 (988 pts)	DNF (100 pts)	12:57.70 (612 pts)	3268

== Medal table ==
Rank	Nation	Gold	Silver	Bronze	Total
1	United States	1	0	1	2
2	Brazil	1	0	0	1
3	Canada	0	1	1	2
4	Cuba	0	1	0	1
Totals (4 entries)		2	2	2	6
