= Joshua Riker-Fox =

Canadian modern pentathlete (born 1983)

Personal information
- Nicknames: Josher, Riker, JJ
- Nationality: Canada
- Born: 6 September 1983 (age 43) Calgary, Alberta, Canada
- Height: 1.87 m (6 ft 1 1/2 in)
- Weight: 76 kg (168 lb)

Sport
- Sport: Modern pentathlon
- Club: Ares Pentathlon; Dinos Athletics
- Coached by: John Hawes
Medal record
Men's modern pentathlon
Representing Canada
Pan American Games
Bronze medal – third place	2007 Rio de Janeiro	Individual

Joshua Riker-Fox (born 6 September 1983) is a four-time Pan American Games modern pentathlete from Canada. He is also a four-time Canadian national champion, and a bronze medalist at the 2007 Pan American Games in Rio de Janeiro, Brazil.

Born and raised in Calgary, Alberta, Riker-Fox started out his sporting career as a horse rider and a member of the Pony Club, until he began with modern pentathlon at the age of eleven, when he was truly inspired by the 1992 Canadian Olympic team. Riker-Fox made his international debut in 2003, when he qualified for the Pan American Games in Santo Domingo, Dominican Republic, and finished seventh in the men's event. He also took part in Junior World Championships, World Cup circuits, and other national and continental competitions, where he produced and accomplished outstanding results in the individual and team events. Riker-Fox competed at the 2007 Pan American Games in Rio de Janeiro, and won a bronze medal in the men's competition, which gave him an automatic qualifying berth for the 2008 Summer Olympics in Beijing.

Riker-Fox was selected to the national modern pentathlon team, along with his teammates Monica Pinette and Kara Grant, and made his official debut for the men's event at the 2008 Summer Olympics. During the competition, Riker-Fox struggled in the early segments, with disappointing scores in pistol shooting and in 200-m freestyle swimming, but managed to put his position into the top level when he placed eighth in the horse-riding segment, with a number of obstacle and time penalties. Despite his rough start in the competition, Riker-Fox accomplished a higher result by a Canadian male in an Olympic modern pentathlon, finishing in twenty-fourth place. After the Olympics, Riker-Fox progressed further in the World Championships and other competitions, and managed to reach the seventh position in a career high World Cup ranking in 2010. He made his third appearance at the 2011 Pan American Games in Guadalajara, Mexico, where he placed eighth in the men's event. He was not selected for the 2012 Olympic team.

Riker-Fox graduated from the University of Calgary in 2008, with a bachelor's degree in commerce and kinesiology, and is currently working towards his master's degree in business administration. Apart from modern pentathlon, he also spent a year playing for the university volleyball varsity team.
