= Misipeka =

Misipeka is a surname. Notable people with the surname include:

- Lisa Misipeka (born 1975), American Samoan athlete
- Trevor Misipeka (born 1979), American football player and athlete from American Samoa
