= Modern pentathlon at the 2023 Pan American Games – Men's individual =

Men's individual at the 2023 Pan American Games
- Venue: Las Condes Military School
- Dates: October 21 - October 23
- Competitors: 32 from 14 nations
- Winning score: 1534

Medalists
Gold medal	Emiliano Hernández; Mexico
Silver medal	Duilio Carrillo; Mexico
Bronze medal	Andrés Torres; Ecuador

The men's individual competition of the modern pentathlon events at the 2023 Pan American Games was held from October 21 to 23 at Las Condes Military School in Chile.

== Schedule ==
Date	Time	Round
October 21, 2023	12:00	Fencing Ranking Round
October 22, 2023	14:35	Semifinals A - Fencing Bonus Round
October 22, 2023	15:10	Semifinals A - Swimming 200m Freestyle
October 22, 2023	15:40	Semifinals A - Laser Run
October 22, 2023	17:30	Semifinals B - Fencing Bonus Round
October 22, 2023	18:05	Semifinals B - Swimming 200m Freestyle
October 22, 2023	18:35	Semifinals B - Laser Run
October 23, 2023	16:00	Finals - Riding
October 23, 2023	16:40	Finals - Fencing Bonus Round
October 23, 2023	17:15	Finals - Swimming 200m Freestyle
October 23, 2023	17:45	Finals - Laser Run

== Results ==
Qualified for the finals

Rank	Athlete	Nation	Fencing Victories (pts)	Swimming Time (pts)	Riding Time (pts)	Laser run Time (pts)	Score
1st place, gold medalist(s)	Emiliano Hernández	Mexico	19 (238)	2:08.56 (293)	55.60 (300)	09:57 (703)	1534
2nd place, silver medalist(s)	Duilio Carrillo	Mexico	25 (274)	2:13.44 (284)	62.40 (298)	10:43 (657)	1513
3rd place, bronze medalist(s)	Andrés Torres	Ecuador	19 (238)	2:07.06 (296)	56.30 (300)	10:47 (653)	1487
4	Marcos Rojas	Cuba	22 (258)	2:06.21 (298)	52.40 (283)	10:58 (642)	1481
5	Franco Serrano	Argentina	23 (266)	2:09.72 (291)	65.00 (278)	10:56 (644)	1479
6	Andrés Fernández	Independent Athletes Team	13 (202)	2:05.99 (299)	60.20 (279)	10.08 (692)	1472
7	Brendan Anderson	United States	16 (220)	2:13.67 (283)	57.00 (279)	10:12 (688)	1470
8	Juan Ochoa	Independent Athletes Team	14 (208)	2:10.01 (290)	65.00 (288)	10:17 (683)	1469
9	Sergio Villamayor	Argentina	18 (240)	2:21.13 (268)	55.30 (293)	10:40 (660)	1461
10	Esteban Bustos	Chile	17 (228)	2:15.04 (280)	54.00 (286)	10:33 (667)	1461
11	Tristen Bell	United States	15 (220)	2:17.17 (276)	51.00 (293)	10:33 (645)	1434
12	William Muinhos	Brazil	15 (214)	2:17.95 (275)	52.00 (300)	10:59 (641)	1430
13	Lester Ders del Rosario	Cuba	13 (202)	2:1461 (281)	71.00 (238)	10:33 (667)	1388
14	Quinn Schulz	Canada	17 (228)	2:08.74 (293)	78.00 (255)	11:28 (612)	1388
15	Manuel Padilla	Mexico	18 (234)	2:17.32 (276)	EL	10:03 (697)	1207
16	Danilo Fagundes	Brazil	17 (226)	2:18.78 (273)	EL	10:16 (684)	1183
17	Martín Gajardo	Chile	13 (210)	2:10.57 (289)	EL	10:58 (642)	1141
18	Gabriel Sasaqui	Brazil	19 (238)	2:14.24 (282)	EL	11:23 (617)	1137
19	Juan Pablo Velazquez	Cuba	14 (208)	2:17.56 (275)		11:22 (618)	1101
20	Emanuel Zapata	Argentina	17 (230)	2:17.71 (275)	EL	11:45 (595)	1100
21	Bayardo Naranjo	Ecuador	15 (214)	2:13.05 (284)		11:41 (599)	1097
22	Robert Bonomo	Canada	8 (174)	2:07.45 (296)		11:14 (628)	1096
23	Gabriel Dominguez	Dominican Republic	10 (188)	2:19.89 (271)		11:08 (632)	1091
24	Isaac Hernández	Ecuador	7 (166)	2:19.83 (271)		10:55 (645)	1082
25	Bryan Blanco	Uruguay	13 (202)	2:31.68 (247)		11:32 (608)	1057
26	Albert Rivas	Venezuela	16 (222)	2:19.98 (261)		12:07 (573)	1056
27	José Miguel Molina	Independent Athletes Team	8 (174)	2:20.98 (269)		11:31 (609)	1052
28	Yicxon Perez	Venezuela	11 (198)	2:16.77 (277)		12:03 (577)	1052
29	Jair Samame	Peru	15 (214)	2:24.88 (261)		12:!9 (561)	1036
30	Francesco Chumacero	Bolivia	8 (174)	2:23.51 (263)		11:55 (585)	1022
31	Santiago Bedia	Peru	7 (166)	2:22.36 (266)		12:45 (535)	967
	Bryan Almonte	Dominican Republic	DNS	DNS		DNS	
