= Adrián Solano (cross-country skier) =

Venezuelan cross-country skier (born 1994)

Personal information
- Full name: Adrián Solano
- Born: 21 October 1994 (age 31) Maracay, Venezuela

Sport
- Sport: Skiing

World Cup career
- Seasons: 2017–
Medal record
Men's cross country skiing
Representing Venezuela
- Updated on 1 March 2017

Adrián Solano (born 21 October 1994) is a Venezuelan cross-country skier who has competed since 2017.

== Biography ==
Solano, a professional cook, was introduced to cross-country skiing by César Baena, coach of the Venezuelan cross-country team, training on roller-skis on weekends in Maracay, Venezuela. While traveling to a training camp in Sweden, Solano was detained by authorities in Paris who reportedly questioned the viability of a Venezuelan ski team and accused him of trying to seek political asylum and sent him back to Venezuela.

Aleksi Valavuori, a Finnish television personality, created a GoFundMe campaign that enabled Solano to travel to Lahti, Finland to compete in the FIS Nordic World Ski Championships 2017. Never having seen snow before, Solano made his debut in the 10-kilometer classical qualifying race for non-skiing nations, exiting the race after completing 3.5 kilometres in over 39 minutes. The following day, Solano competed in the qualification event for the freestyle sprint, skating in classic boots and finishing the 1.6 kilometer course in just over 13 minutes.

Videos of Solano's performance in the 10-kilometer event, which included multiple falls, a broken pole, and much assistance from coaches, circulated on the Internet, leading various media outlets to dub him the "World's Worst Skier" and compare him to Eddie "the Eagle" Edwards and the 1988 Jamaican bobsled team. Venezuela reprimanded France over their earlier treatment of Solano, with President Nicolás Maduro ordering a "strong protest to the French government for the affront against the Venezuelan athlete." Within Venezuela, citizens grew angry over concerns that Solano had been funded by Maduro's government to compete during the country's ongoing economic recession. Solano has denied rumors that he is funded by the government, stating that it was only through Valavuori's efforts that he was able to compete in Lahti.

Prior to the event, Solano publicly stated his goal of representing Venezuela in the 2022 Winter Olympics. However, Solano did not end up competing in the 2022 Winter Olympics, with Venezuela abstaining from the cross-country skiing event altogether.

== See also ==
- List of uncompetitive athletes
