= Modern pentathlon at the 2023 Pan American Games – Men's relay =

Men's relay at the 2023 Pan American Games
- Venue: Las Condes Military School
- Dates: October 27
- Competitors: 24 from 12 nations
- Winning score: 1413

Medalists
Gold medal	Duilio Carrillo; Emiliano Hernández	Mexico
Silver medal	Tristan Bell; Brendan Anderson	United States
Bronze medal	Bayardo Naranjo; Andrés Torres	Ecuador

The men's relay competition of the modern pentathlon events at the 2023 Pan American Games was held on October 27 at Las Condes Military School in Chile.

== Schedule ==
Date	Time	Round
October 27, 2023	11:00	Fencing
October 27, 2023	14:30	Riding
October 27, 2023	15:15	Fencing Bonus Round
October 27, 2023	16:00	Swimming 200m Freestyle
October 27, 2023	16:30	Laser Run

== Results ==
Rank	Athlete	Nation	Riding Time (pts)	Fencing Victories (pts)	Swimming Time (pts)	Laser run Time (pts)	Score
1st place, gold medalist(s)	Duilio Carrillo; Emiliano Hernández	Mexico	142.40 (257)	22 (232)	1:58.83 (313)	11:29 (611)	1413
2nd place, silver medalist(s)	Tristan Bell; Brendan Anderson	United States	117.00 (283)	21 (222)	2:01.07 (308)	11:56 (584)	1397
3rd place, bronze medalist(s)	Bayardo Naranjo; Andrés Torres	Ecuador	117.00 (279)	19 (222)	1:54.47 (322)	12:07 (573)	1396
4	Martín Gajardo; Esteban Bustos	Chile	139.00 (267)	25 (238)	1:58.32 (314)	12:31 (549)	1368
5	Franco Serrano; Sergio Villamayor	Argentina	144.00 (252)	16 (206)	2:01.53 (307)	11:58 (592)	1357
6	Lester Ders del Rosario; Marcos Rojas Jiménez	Cuba	128.00 (273)	16 (202)	1:54.00 (322)	12:42 (538)	1337
7	Yicxon Pérez; Albert Rivas	Venezuela	161.00 (252)	24 (234)	2:03.82 (303)	13:02 (518)	1307
8	Robert Bonomo; Quinn Schulz	Canada	144.00 (218)	19 (214)	1:52.85 (325)	13:24 (496)	1263
9	Juan Ochoa; Andrés Fernández	Independent Athletes Team	EL	21 (224)	1:54.38 (322)	11:48 (592)	1138
10	Gabriel Sasaqui; Danilo Fagundes	Brazil	EL	20 (218)	2:01.77 (307)	12:07 (573)	1098
11	Santiago Bedia Carpio; Jair Samame Bernabé	Peru	EL	13 (190)	2:07.93 (295)	13:20 (500)	985
12	Brayan Almonte; Gabriel Domínguez	Dominican Republic	DNS	DNS	DNS	DNS	0
