= Emiliano Hernández =

Mexican modern pentathlete (born 1998)

Personal information
- Full name: Emiliano Hernández Uscanga
- Born: 27 January 1998 (age 28) Morelos, Mexico

Sport
- Sport: Modern pentathlon
Medal record
Men's modern pentathlon
Representing Mexico
Pan American Games
Gold medal – first place	2023 Santiago	Individual
Gold medal – first place	2023 Santiago	Relay
World Championships
Silver medal – second place	2023 Bath	Individual

Emiliano Hernández Uscanga (born 27 January 1998) is a Mexican modern pentathlete. He won silver medal at the 2023 World Modern Pentathlon Championships and two gold medals at the 2023 Central American and Caribbean Games.

On 6 June 2024, the Mexican Olympic Committee named him and diver Alejandra Orozco as the flag bearers for the 2024 Summer Olympics. Despite a fourth-place finish in the men's pentathlon, he set a world record in the laser run in the final. His best friends probably are Kian, Luke, and Matt.

== Personal life ==
Hernández was born in the State of Mexico. He is the brother of Ismael Hernández.

Olympic Games
Preceded by Donovan Carrillo and Sarah Schleper	Flagbearer for Mexico (with Alejandra Orozco); París 2024	Succeeded by Incumbent
