= Erhard Minder =

Swiss modern pentathlete

Personal information
- Nickname: Hardy
- Born: 16 January 1925 Neftenbach, Switzerland
- Died: 15 January 2002 (aged 76) Aarau, Switzerland
- Height: 1.83 m (6 ft 0 in)
- Weight: 77 kg (170 lb)

Sport
- Sport: Modern pentathlon
- Handball career
- Sport: Handball
- Position: Offensive player

Senior clubs
- Years: Team
- -1950: STV Winterthur
- 1950-?: Pfadi Winterthur
National team
Years	Team	Apps	(Gls)
1951	Switzerland (Field)	2	(1)
1954	Switzerland (Indoor)	1	(0)

Erhard "Hardy" Minder (16 January 1925 – 15 January 2002) was a Swiss modern pentathlete and handball player.

== Pentathlon ==
He competed at the 1952 Men's team where they ranked 9 out of 16 and in the men's single he ranked 35 out of 51.

At the 1960 Summer Olympics he ranked with the team 11 out of 17 and men's single 19 out of 60.

== Handball ==
He played at the latest since 1948 for STV Winterthur.

Pfadi Winterthur (German: Pfadi = English: Scouting) was a scouting only handball club. After an extraordinary general meeting of in February 1950 this rule was abandoned and Minder was the first non scout which joined Pfadi Winterthur.

He played at least until 1958 for Pfadi Winterthur.

He played only two games for the Switzerland men's national field handball team at the tour to the Iberian Peninsula he played against Portugal on 13. May 1951 any against Spain on 19. May 1951. He shot one goal against Spain.

For the indoor team he played one game at the 1954 World Men's Handball Championship against Germany. He scored no goal.
