= Bechir Mardassi =

Tunisian cyclist

Personal information
- Born: 18 December 1929 Tunis, Tunisia

Cycling career
- Sport: Cycling

Bechir Mardassi (born 18 December 1929) was a Tunisian cyclist. He was born in Tunis and his profession was a driver. He competed in the individual road race and team time trial events at the 1960 Summer Olympics.
