= Trevor Misipeka =

American Samoan gridiron football player (born 1979)

Trevor Misipeka (born 17 June 1979 in Pago Pago) is an American football player and athlete from American Samoa. He played for the now defunct Quad City Steamwheelers in the Arena Football League's af2 league. He was also a former Shotputter, that competed in the 2001 IAAF World Athletic Championships. Although, due to a sudden last minute rule change, he was assigned the 100 Metre Dash, placing last with 14.28 seconds.

== Biography ==
Misipeka is known for his performance in the 100 metres in the 2001 World Athletics Championships, held in Edmonton, Alberta, Canada. He represented American Samoa and had originally intended to compete in the shot put, but the Samoan federation discovered that the IAAF's policy of allowing competitors from small countries to enter without meeting qualifying standards had recently been changed, and now applied only to track events and not field ones.

Having already arrived at the championships, he was told by the Samoan federation with just two days notice that he was instead being entered for the 100 metres. Weighing over 133 kg (293 lb), he finished last in his heat, recording a time of 14.28 seconds, nearly four seconds behind the winner Kim Collins. It was one of the slowest times ever seen in the World Championships. He was nicknamed "Trevor the Tortoise" in a similar vein to other popular sporting heroes such as Eddie "The Eagle" Edwards and Eric "The Eel" Moussambani.

After the championships he completed a business degree at California Baptist University and then turned to arena football, playing for the San Diego Riptide from 2002 until 2005 and then the Quad City Steamwheelers. After the AF2's demise, he became a baker.

== See also ==
- List of uncompetitive athletes
