= Monica Pinette =

Canadian modern pentathlete (born 1977)

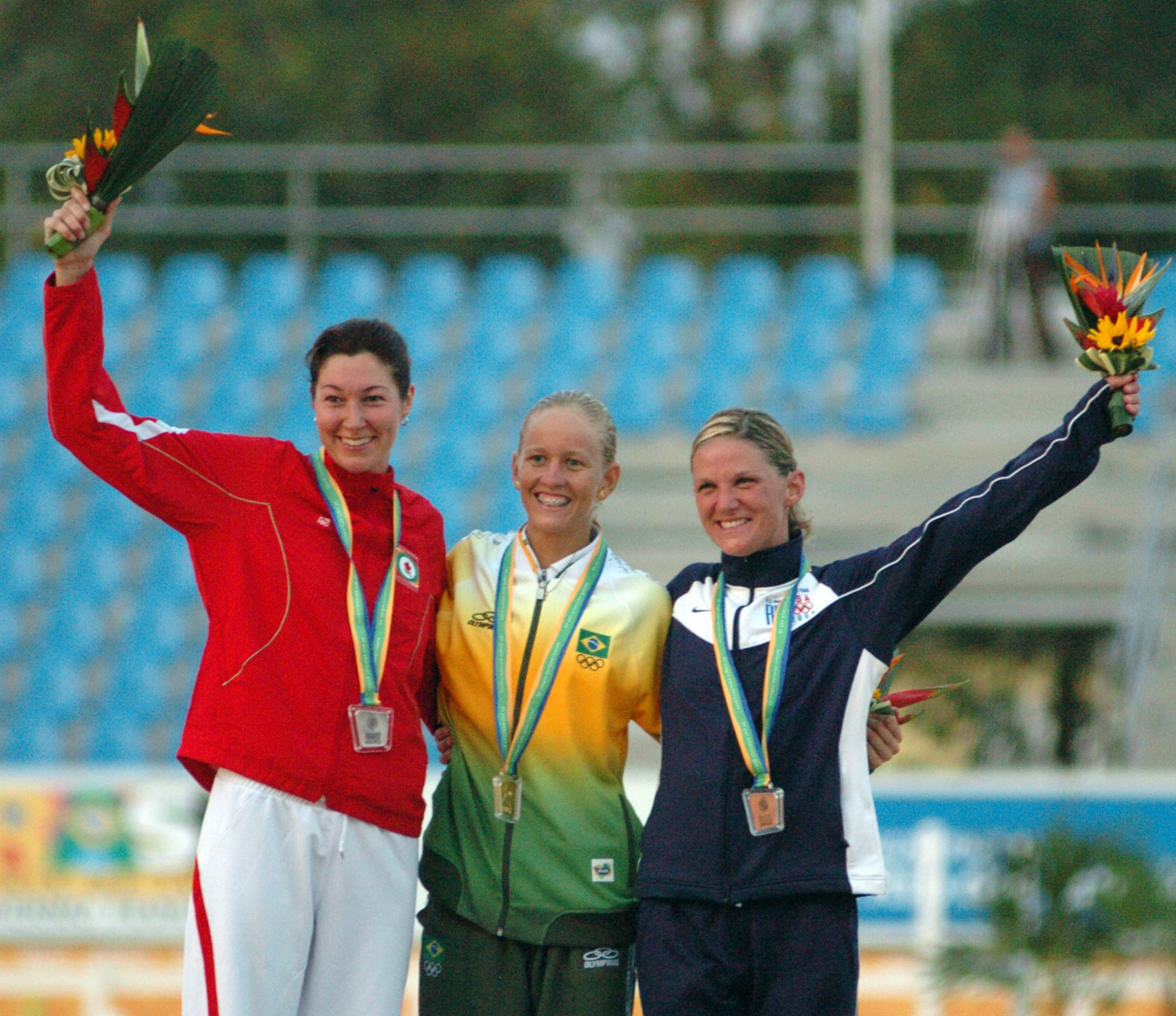
- Monica Pinette, Yane Marques and Michelle Kelly at the 2007 Pan American Games

Personal information
- Nationality: Canadian
- Born: February 5, 1977 (age 49) Vancouver, British Columbia
- Home town: Langley, British Columbia
- Height: 1.76 m (5 ft 9 1/2 in)
- Weight: 59 kg (130 lb)

Sport
- Sport: Modern pentathlon
- Club: Fraser Valley Modern Pentathlon Association
- Coached by: Philipp Waeffler
Medal record
Representing Canada
Pan American Games
Silver medal – second place	2007 Rio de Janeiro	Individual

Monica Pinette (born February 5, 1977) is a two-time Olympic modern pentathlete from Canada. She is one of the first female Canadian modern pentathletes, and the only indigenous athlete of (Métis) to compete at the 2004 Summer Olympics in Athens, Greece. Her 13th-place finish overall at the 2004 Summer Olympics was Canada's best recorded performance in the modern pentathlon to date.

== Early life and career ==
Pinette was born in the city of Vancouver and grew up in Langley, British Columbia. Pinette began her sporting career as a member of the Pony Club in Vancouver. She took up the pentathlon at age 21. She has participated in modern pentathlon at local clubs for swimming, shooting, fencing, and horse-riding.

Pinette graduated from the University of Victoria with a Bachelor of Arts degree in English, and earned a diploma in Journalism and Photojournalism from the Western Academy of Photography. She was coached by her husband Philipp Waeffler, 1996 Olympic modern pentathlete from Switzerland.

Pinette has described the dynamic of having her husband and coach be the same person as having "Two Philipps," mentioning her process of separating the roles of husband and coach in order to avoid getting frustrated. In 2009, Monica Pinette received the British Columbia Premier's Award. She received a National Aboriginal Achievement Award, now known as the Indspire Awards in the sport category in 2010. She said she was surprised to win the award given that pentathlon is a small sport that often has little media coverage or attention.

== Competitive career ==
She made her international debut at the 2002 and 2003 World Championships and eventually competed at the 2003 Pan American Games in Santo Domingo, Dominican Republic, where she finished seventh. Following this Pinette qualified for the 2004 Summer Olympics in Athens, along with her compatriot Kara Grant. They made their national debut in the women's event. Following a strong fencing segment, Pinette finished thirteenth overall, the highest position achieved by a modern Canadian pentathlete, male or female, in Olympic history.

Pinette continued to earn a fourth-place finish for the team relay at the 2006 World Modern Pentathlon Championships in Guatemala City, Guatemala, and also, her first medal by winning gold at the Pan American Championships in the same year. She also added her silver medal at the 2007 Pan American Games in Rio de Janeiro, Brazil, which qualified her for the 2008 Summer Olympics in Beijing. At the Olympics, Pinette finished in twenty-seventh place, following a poor performance in the last three sporting segments.

== Personal life ==
Pinette contributed to the creation of a booklet titled Growing Up Healthy that encourages First Nations parents in British Columbia to live a healthy lifestyle. Pinette is married, has two sons and is living with her family near Cologne in Germany.
