= Umberto I Shooting Range =

Firing range in Rome, Italy

The Umberto I Shooting Range is a firing range located in the Lazio region west of Rome, Italy. For the 1960 Summer Olympics, it hosted the pistol and rifle shooting, and the shooting part of the modern pentathlon events.
