= Enrique Rettberg =

Argentine fencer

Personal information
- Nationality: Argentine
- Born: 12 August 1918
- Died: 28 January 2000 (aged 81)

Sport
- Sport: Fencing

Enrique Rettberg (12 August 1918 – 28 January 2000) was an Argentine épée fencer. He competed at the 1952 Summer Olympics.
