= Robert Beck (pentathlete) =

American pentathlete and fencer (1936–2020)

Bob Beck
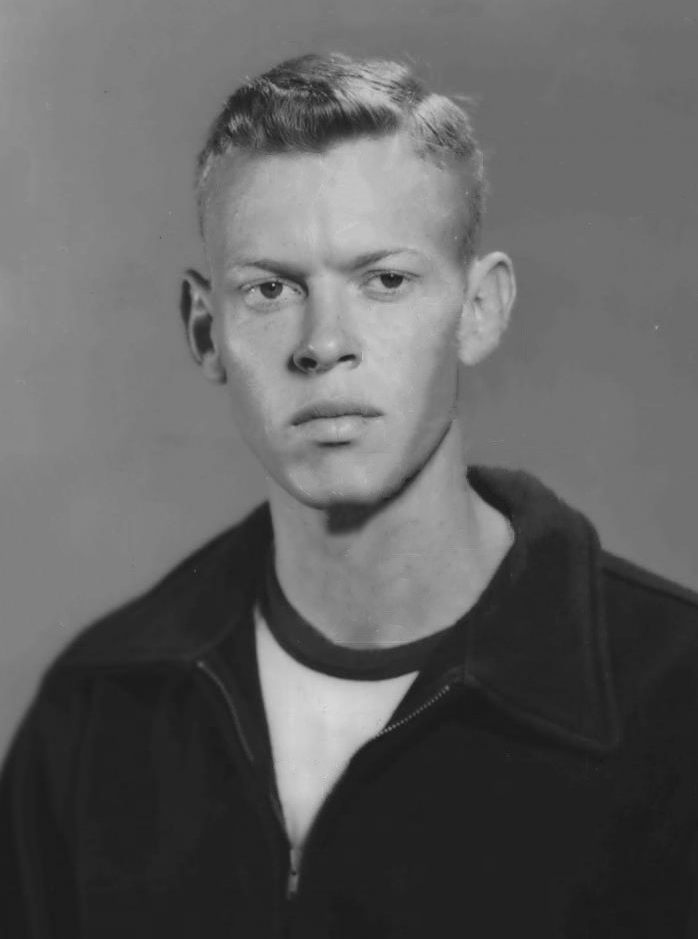
- Beck in 1958

Personal information
- Full name: Robert Lee Beck
- Born: December 30, 1936 San Diego, California, U.S.
- Died: April 2, 2020 (aged 83) San Antonio, Texas, U.S.
- Height: 188 cm (6 ft 2 in)
- Weight: 76 kg (168 lb)

Sport
- Sport: Modern pentathlon, épée fencing
- Club: Harvard Crimson
Medal record
Representing the United States
Men's modern pentathlon
Olympic Games
| Bronze medal – third place | 1960 Rome | Individual |
| Bronze medal – third place | 1960 Rome | Team |
World Championships
| Bronze medal – third place | 1961 Moscow | Team |
Pan American Games
| Gold medal – first place | 1963 São Paulo | Individual |
| Gold medal – first place | 1963 São Paulo | Team |
Men's fencing
Pan American Games
| Gold medal – first place | 1971 Cali | Épée, team |

Robert Lee Beck (December 30, 1936 – April 2, 2020) was an American modern pentathlete and fencer who won three gold medals in these disciplines at the Pan American Games in 1963–1971. He also won bronze medals in the individual and team modern pentathlon events at the 1960 Summer Olympics. He was less successful at the 1968 Games, placing 22nd individually and fourth with the American team.

Beck graduated from the University of Virginia and Harvard Medical School. Beck was a practising dentist in San Antonio, Texas, during his professional career. He was hospitalized in February 2020, due to a head injury from a fall in front of his home. He died on April 2, 2020, at age 83, after contracting COVID-19.

As of the Paris 2024 Olympics, he was the last athlete from the United States to win an individual medal in men's pentathlon.

== See also ==
- List of USFA Division I National Champions
