= Christian Beauvalet =

French modern pentathlete (1929–2022)

Christian Louis Henri Beauvalet
Personal information
- Nationality: French
- Born: 18 December 1929 Alençon, France
- Died: 23 July 2022 (aged 92) Muret, France
- Height: 5 ft 6 in (168 cm)
- Weight: 68 kg (150 lb)

Sport
- Sport: Modern pentathlon

Christian Louis Henri Beauvalet (18 December 1929 – 23 July 2022) was a French modern pentathlete. He competed at the 1960 Summer Olympics where he finished 45th in the Men's Individual event, and 15th in the team event.
