= Sven Thofelt =

Swedish modern pentathlete and épée fencer

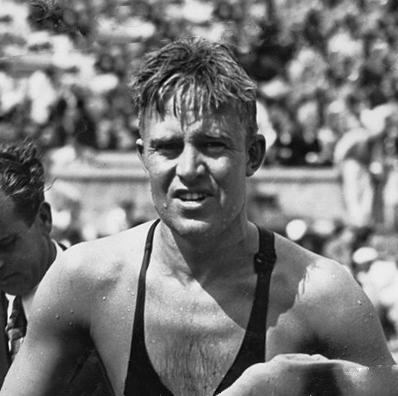
- Sven Thofelt, circa 1930

Personal information
- Nationality: Swedish
- Born: 19 May 1904 Stockholm, Sweden
- Died: 1 February 1993 (aged 88) Stockholm, Sweden

Sport
- Country: Sweden
- Sport: Fencing, modern pentathlon
Medal record
Representing Sweden
Olympic Games
Gold medal – first place	1928 Amsterdam	Modern pentathlon
Silver medal – second place	1936 Berlin	Team épée
Bronze medal – third place	1948 London	Team épée
World Fencing Championships
Silver medal – second place	1938 Piešťany	Team épée
Silver medal – second place	1947 Lisbon	Team épée
Bronze medal – third place	1931 Vienna	Team épée
Bronze medal – third place	1933 Budapest	Team épée
Bronze medal – third place	1934 Warsaw	Team épée
Bronze medal – third place	1937 Paris	Team épée

Sven Alfred Thofelt (19 May 1904 – 1 February 1993) was a Swedish modern pentathlete and épée fencer who competed at the 1928, 1932, 1936 and 1948 Summer Olympics.

== Early life ==
Thofelt was born on 19 May 1904 in Stockholm, Sweden, the son of major Alfred Thofelt and his wife Vera Pousette.

== Career ==
=== Military career ===
Thofelt was commissioned as an officer after graduating from the Military Academy Karlberg in 1924 and was assigned as a second lieutenant to Svea Artillery Regiment in Stockholm. He was promoted to lieutenant in 1928 and attended the higher course at the Artillery and Engineering College from 1928 to 1930. Thofelt was promoted to captain in the Swedish Army Ordnance Corps in 1937 and served in Göta Artillery Regiment in Gothenburg in 1938. He served as a teacher at the Military Academy Karlberg from 1938 to 1943 when he was promoted to major and was assigned to Karlsborg Anti-Aircraft Regiment in Karlsborg. He transferred to Stockholm Anti-Aircraft Regiment in Stockholm in 1944 and to Luleå Anti-Aircraft Corps in Luleå in 1948. Thofelt then served as a lieutenant colonel in Stockholm Anti-Aircraft Regiment in 1949 and attended the Swedish National Defence College in Stockholm in 1954.

Thofelt was an adjutant of the Crown Prince Gustaf Adolf (1938–47) and King Gustav V (1948–50). Thofelt was promoted to colonel in 1954 and was appointed commander of the Swedish Army Anti-Aircraft School (Luftvärnsskjutskolan, LvSS) in Stockholm in 1954. The year after Thofelt became commander of Östgöta Anti-Aircraft Regiment in Linköping, a post he held for two years. In 1957 he was appointed Inspector of the Swedish Anti-Aircraft Artillery. He retired in 1964.

=== Sports career ===
In the modern pentathlon, Thofelt won the gold medal in the 1928 Olympics and finished fourth in 1932 and 1936, competing in 1932 with broken ribs and injured arm due to a bad fall from the horse. In fencing, he won two team medals in 1936 and 1948, finishing ninth individually in 1932. He also won four bronze and two silver medals in the team épée at the world championships of 1931–1947.

Nationally Thofelt won six titles in the modern pentathlon, three in the individual épée, and one in the 4 × 100 m freestyle swimming.

In parallel with his military career, he served as a sports administrator. In 1948 he became secretary-general of the Union Internationale de Pentathlon Moderne, and in 1960–1988 served as its president. He was also president of the Swedish Fencing Federation (1968) and of the executive board of the Swedish Olympic Committee (1969–76). Between 1970 and 1976 Thofelt was an IOC member and later an IOC honorary member.

Thofelt was the Swedish team leader at the 1956 Summer Olympics, where his son Björn competed in the modern pentathlon. Björn previously won the world title in 1954.

== Personal life ==
In 1932, Thofelt married Birgit Friis (born 1910), the daughter of Lieutenant General Torsten Friis and Lotty Salin. They had five children: Lars (1933–2021), Björn (born 1935), Sven (1939–2010), Hans (born 1942) and Ulla (born 1944).

== Dates of rank ==
- 1924 – Second lieutenant
- 1928 – Lieutenant
- 1937 – Captain
- 1943 – Major
- 1949 – Lieutenant colonel
- 1954 – Colonel

== Awards and decorations ==
=== Swedish ===
- (Sweden) King Gustaf V's Jubilee Commemorative Medal (1948)
- (Sweden) King Gustaf V's Commemorative Medal (1951)
- (Sweden) Commander 1st Class of the Order of the Sword (4 June 1960)
- (Sweden) Swedish Central Federation for Voluntary Military Training Medal of Merit in silver
- (Sweden) Swedish Fencing Federation Gold Medal (Svenska fäktförbundets guldmedalj)
- (Sweden) Swedish Military Sports Association Gold Medal (Sveriges militära idrottsförbunds guldmedalj, SvmifbGM)
- (Sweden) Swedish Sports Confederation Gold Medal (Sveriges riksidrottsförbunds guldmedalj, SvrifbGM)
- (Sweden) Stockholm Air Defence Association Silver Medal (Stockholms luftvärnsförenings silvermedalj)
- (Sweden) Commemorative Medal on the occasion of the second Lingiad (Minnesmedalj med anledning av andra Lingiaden) (1949)

=== Foreign ===
- (Chile) Commander of the Order of Merit
- (Portugal) Commander of the Military Order of Aviz
- Knight 1st Class of the Order of the White Rose of Finland
- (Nazi Germany) 3rd Class of the Order of the German Eagle
- (France) French Gold Medal de l’Education Physique
- 2nd Class of the Finland's Olympic Cross of Merit (Suomen Olympialainen 2. luokan ansioristin)

== Honours ==
- Member of the Royal Swedish Academy of War Sciences (1956)

== See also ==
- Dual sport and multi-sport Olympians

Sporting positions
Preceded by Gustaf Dyrssen	President of International Modern Pentathlon Union; 1960–1988	Succeeded by Igor Novikov
