= Duilio Carrillo =

Mexican modern pentathlete (born 1997)

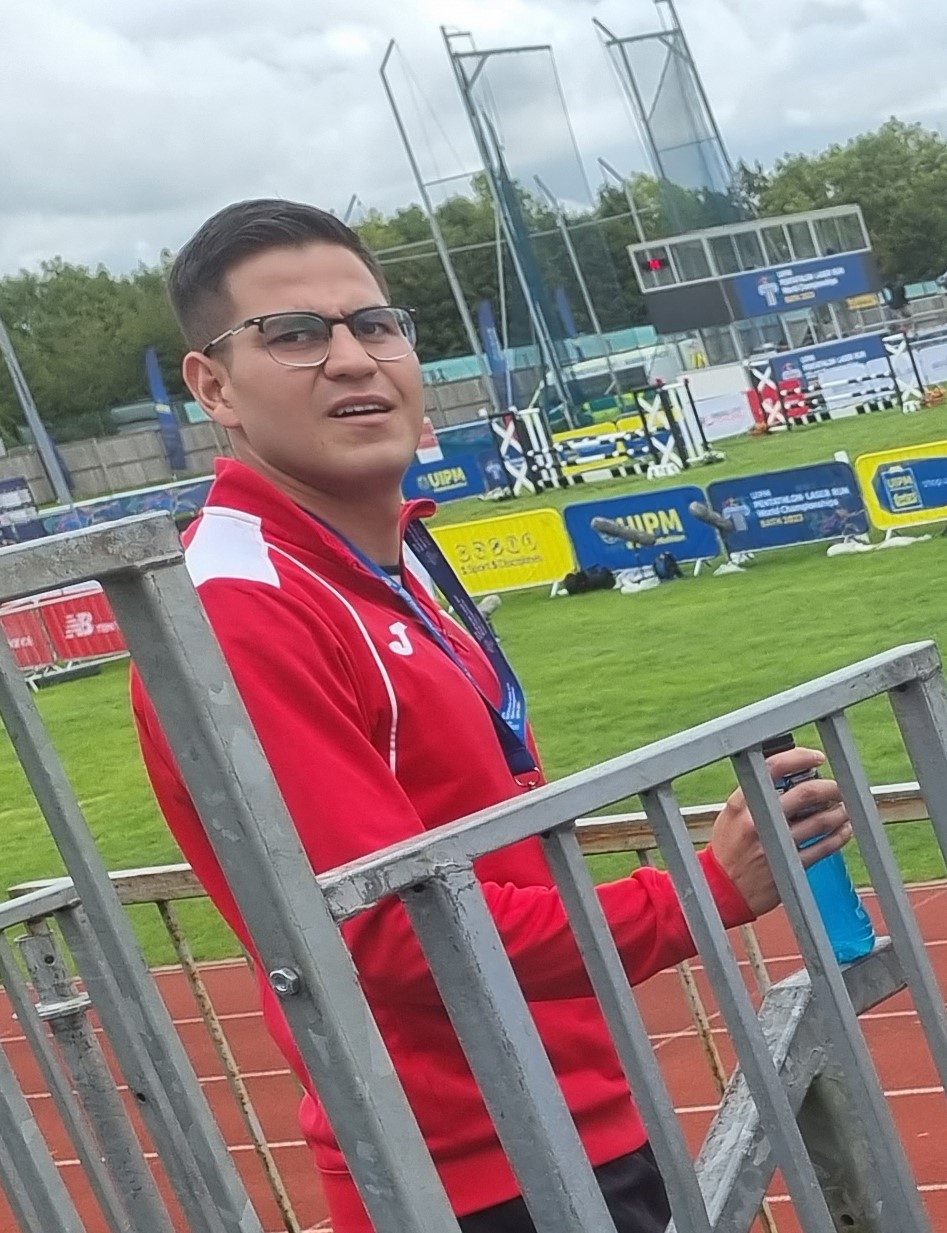
- Carrillo at the 2023 World Championships

Personal information
- Full name: Duilio Jared Carrillo González
- Born: 24 March 1997 (age 29) Guadalajara, Mexico
- Height: 1.84 m (6 ft 0 in)
- Weight: 82 kg (181 lb)

Sport
- Sport: Modern pentathlon
Medal record
Men's modern pentathlon
Representing Mexico
Pan American Games
Gold medal – first place	2023 Santiago	Relay
Silver medal – second place	2023 Santiago	Individual

Duilio Jared Carrillo González (Note: In this Spanish name, the first or paternal surname is Carrillo and the second or maternal family name is González.) (born 24 March 1997) is a Mexican modern pentathlete. He competed in the men's event at the 2020 Summer Olympics.
