= Ali Ben Ali =

Tunisian cyclist

Personal information
- Born: 23 July 1933 (age 93) Tunis, Tunisia

Cycling career
- Sport: Cycling

Ali Ben Ali (born 23 July 1933) is a Tunisian former cyclist. He competed in the individual road race and team time trial events at the 1960 Summer Olympics.
