= Arsène Pint =

Belgian modern pentathlete

Personal information
- Born: 7 May 1933 (age 93) Halle, Belgium

Sport
- Sport: Modern pentathlon

Arsène Pint (born 7 May 1933) is a Belgian modern pentathlete. He competed at the 1960 Summer Olympics.
