= Mohamed Ben Checkroun =

Moroccan modern pentathlete

Personal information
- Born: 9 April 1937 (age 89) Casablanca, Morocco

Sport
- Sport: Modern pentathlon

Mohamed Ben Checkroun (born 9 April 1937) is a Moroccan modern pentathlete. He competed at the 1960 Summer Olympics.
