= Joaquín Villalba =

Modern pentathlete

Personal information
- Born: 29 September 1928 Pamplona, Spain
- Died: 26 November 2007 (aged 79)

Sport
- Sport: Modern pentathlon

Joaquín Villalba (29 September 1928 – 26 November 2007) was a Spanish modern pentathlete. He competed at the 1960 Summer Olympics.
