= Acqua Santa Golf Club Course =

Golf course in Italy

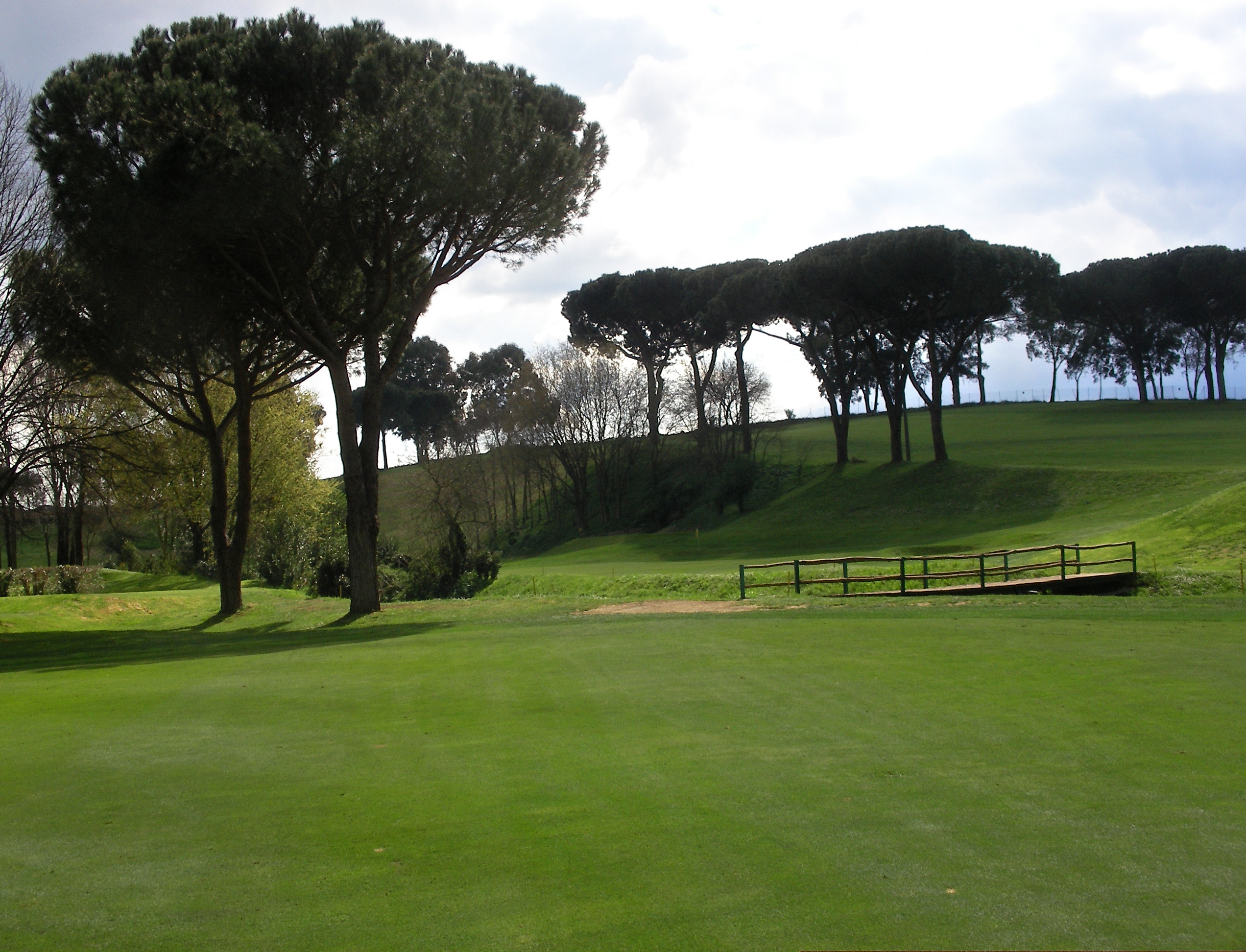
- 17th Hole

- Location within Italy
- 41°50′54″N 12°32′18″E

Club information
- Location: Via Appia Nuova, 716/a, 00178 Rome
- Established: 1903
- Type: Semi-Private
- Tota holes: 18
- Website: https://www.golfroma.it/
- Par: 71
- Length: 5,854 metres (6,402 yd)
- Course rating: 71.8
- Slope rating: 135

The Acqua Santa Golf Club Course (Italian: Circolo Roma Acquasanta Golf Club) is an Italian golf course located along the Appian Way southeast of Rome.

Constructed in 1903, it hosted the running portion of the modern pentathlon events for the 1960 Summer Olympics.
