= Nikolay Tatarinov =

Soviet modern pentathlete

Personal information
- Born: 14 December 1927 Leningrad, Russian SFSR, Soviet Union
- Died: 29 May 2017 (aged 89)
- Height: 172 cm (5 ft 8 in)
- Weight: 67 kg (148 lb)

Sport
- Sport: Modern pentathlon
- Club: Armed Forces Leningrad
Medal record
Men's modern pentathlon
Representing Soviet Union
Olympic Games
Silver medal – second place	1960 Rome	Team

Nikolay Matveevich Tatarinov (Russian: Николай Матвеевич Татаринов; 14 December 1927 – 29 May 2017) was a Soviet modern pentathlete and Olympic medalist. He competed at the 1960 Summer Olympics in Rome, where he won a silver medal in the team competition, and placed sixth in the individual competition.

Tatarinov was part of the Soviet teams that held world titles in 1957, 1958 and 1959; individually he won a bronze in 1957. Domestically, he placed second at the Soviet championships in 1957-60, and won team gold medals 1957-59. After retiring from competitions in 1962, he played competitive tennis in seniors tournaments and worked at the physical education department of the S. M. Kirov Military Medical Academy in Saint Petersburg.
