= Ferenc Németh (pentathlete) =

Hungarian modern pentathlete

Personal information
- Born: 4 April 1936 (age 90) Budapest, Hungary

Sport
- Sport: Modern pentathlon
Medal record
Men's modern pentathlon
Representing Hungary
Olympic Games
Gold medal – first place	1960 Rome	Individual
Gold medal – first place	1960 Rome	Team

Ferenc Németh (born 4 April 1936) is a Hungarian modern pentathlete and Olympic champion. He won an individual gold medal at the 1960 Summer Olympics in Rome, and also won the team competition with the Hungarian team.
