= Naji El-Mekki =

El-Mekki Naji
Personal information
- Born: 25 December 1934 (age 91) El Jadida, Morocco

Sport
- Sport: Modern pentathlon, sports shooting
- Rank: General de division

El-Mekki Naji (born 25 December 1934) is a Moroccan modern pentathlete, military officer and sports shooter. He competed at the 1960 Summer Olympics.

He was commissioned as a 2nd lieutenant in the Moroccan Royal Army in 1956 and participated in the Sand War of 1963 as a tank company commander, in the Yom Kippour War as commander of the Moroccan 6th Armored battalion, part of the Moroccan brigade.

He retired in 2002 as a General de division and General inspector of the armored corps.
