= Hanno Selg =

Estonian modern pentathlete (1932–2019)

Personal information
- Born: 31 May 1932 Tartu, Estonia
- Died: 2 October 2019 (aged 87)

Sport
- Sport: Modern pentathlon
Medal record
Men's modern pentathlon
Representing Soviet Union
Olympic Games
Silver medal – second place	1960 Rome	Team

Hanno Selg (31 May 1932 – 2 October 2019) was an Estonian modern pentathlete.

He was a member of the Soviet Union's modern pentathlon Olympic silver medal winning team and an individual 10th place in the 1960 Summer Olympics.

He was also individual champion of the USSR in 1960 and 6-time champion of the Estonian SSR.

Awards and achievements
Preceded by Paul Keres	Estonian Sportsman of the Year; 1960	Succeeded by Toomas Leius
