= Fernando Irayzoz =

Personal information
- Born: 1 November 1924 Barcelona, Spain
- Died: 17 February 1989 (aged 64) Madrid, Spain

Sport
- Sport: Modern pentathlon

Fernando Irayzoz (1 November 1924 – 17 February 1989) was a Spanish modern pentathlete. He competed at the 1960 Summer Olympics.
