= Imre Nagy (pentathlete) =

Hungarian modern pentathlete

Personal information
- Born: 21 February 1933 Monor, Hungary
- Died: 20 October 2013 (aged 80)

Sport
- Sport: Modern pentathlon
Medal record
Men's modern pentathlon
Representing Hungary
Olympic Games
Gold medal – first place	1960 Rome	Team
Silver medal – second place	1960 Rome	Individual
Bronze medal – third place	1964 Tokyo	Team
World Championships
Silver medal – second place	1958 Aldershot	Team
Silver medal – second place	1961 Moscow	Team
Silver medal – second place	1962 Mexico City	Team

Imre Nagy (21 February 1933 – 20 October 2013) was a Hungarian modern pentathlete and Olympic champion. He participated on the Hungarian team that won the gold medals at the 1960 Summer Olympics in Rome, and he also received an individual silver medal at the event. He received a bronze medal with the Hungarian team at the 1964 Summer Olympics in Tokyo.
