= Benny Schmidt =

Danish modern pentathlete (1929–2025)

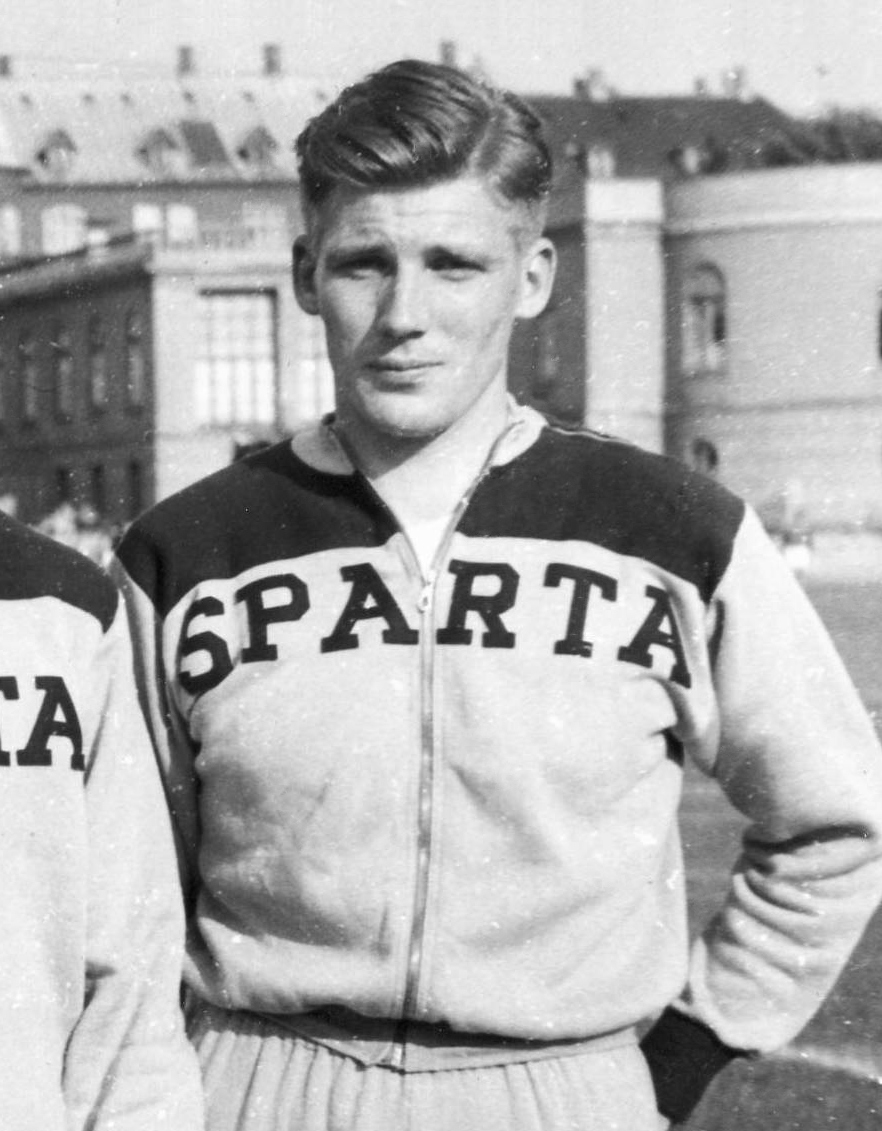
- Benny Schmidt in 1953

Personal information
- Born: 25 June 1929 Horsens, Denmark
- Died: 6 June 2025 (aged 95)
- Height: 186 cm (6 ft 1 in)
- Weight: 86 kg (190 lb)

Sport
- Sport: Modern pentathlon
- Club: DMI Copenhagen

Benny Gotfred Schmidt (25 June 1929 – 6 June 2025) was a Danish modern pentathlete. He competed at the 1960 Summer Olympics, where he also served as the Danish flag bearer. He died on 6 June 2025 at the age of 95.

== Biography ==
Schmidt started as a sprinter and won the national 4×100 m title in 1953, finishing third over 100 m and 200 m in 1954. He then changed to horse riding and pentathlon and won the national show jumping championships in 1956–59. Swimming was his weak part though, and at the 1960 Olympics he used breaststroke instead of conventional crawl. He also performed below his level in shooting, and placed 47th out of 60 overall.

Schmidt was a career military officer; he held the rank of lieutenant in 1960 and retired as lieutenant colonel. After the Olympics he served for four years at Allied Forces Northern Europe in Oslo, Norway, and later was assigned to the Danish Defence Intelligence Service. In 1987 he was awarded the Order of the Dannebrog (Knight's Cross of the first degree).
