= Kazuhiro Tanaka (pentathlete) =

Japanese modern pentathlete

Personal information
- Born: 8 July 1936 (age 89) Fukuoka, Japan

Sport
- Sport: Modern pentathlon

Kazuhiro Tanaka (田中 和宏, Tanaka Kazuhiro; born 8 July 1936) is a Japanese modern pentathlete. He competed at the 1960 Summer Olympics.
