= Michelle Kelly (pentathlete) =

American pentathlete (born 1978)

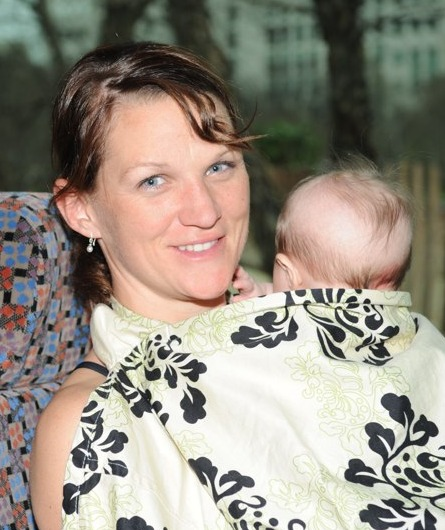
- Kelly with daughter in 2012

Personal information
- Born: 1978 (age 47–48)
- Height: 5 ft 2 in (1.57 m)

Sport
- Sport: Modern pentathlon
- Club: U.S. Army
Medal record
Representing the United States
Pan American Games
| Bronze medal – third place | 2007 Rio de Janeiro | Individual |
Pan American Championships
| Bronze medal – third place | 2005 | Individual |

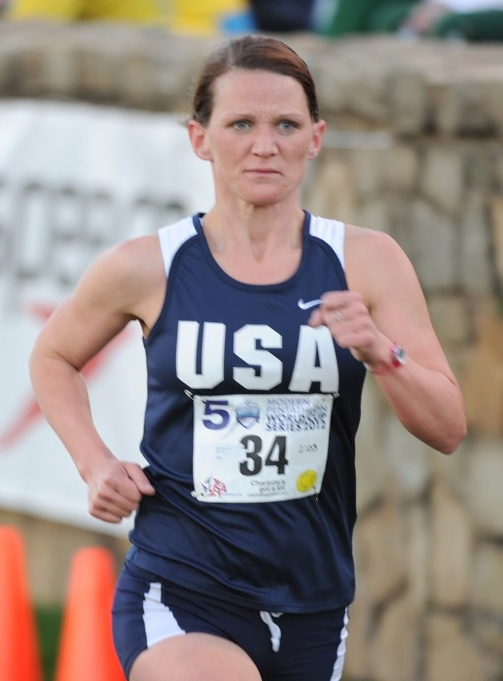
Kelly in 2012

Michelle "Mickey" Kelly (born c. 1978) is an American modern pentathlete who won bronze medals at the 2005 Pan American Championships, 2007 Pan American Games, and Gold at the 2018 Masters World Championship in Halle, Germany.

Kelly is the daughter of Michael and Betsy Kelly. She has six brothers (Jamie, Chris, Casey, Josh, Al and Zilla) and three sisters (Sara, Emilie and Jessinia). In 1996 she graduated from Chatham High School in Chatham, New York, where she trained in cross-country running, basketball and American football, as the only girl on the boys football team. In 2000, she received a Bachelor of Arts degree in teaching from Cortland College. There she took running and swimming and was named the Cortland College Athlete of the Year in 2000. Kelly accolades include a national championship in running, 11-time All American in during her running career in college and 5th place overall in the Army ten-miler.

Kelly is a U.S. Army Major, and has deployed to Iraq and Afghanistan . She has a daughter who was born on November 6, 2011; she resumed top-level competitions just four months after giving birth, and continued low-intensity training through most of her pregnancy period.

In 2014, Kelly became the first female ever to complete Pre-Ranger School at Ft. Drum and was one of the females to attend Ranger School in 2015.

In the summer of 2018, she competed as a last minute substitution for the United States and won Gold in the International Masters Modern Pentathlon Games in Halle, Germany.
