= Raúl Bauza =

Argentine modern pentathlete

Personal information
- Born: 27 August 1934 General Pico, Argentina
- Died: 14 July 2020 (aged 85)

Sport
- Sport: Modern pentathlon

Raúl Bauza (27 August 1934 – 14 July 2020) was an Argentine modern pentathlete. He competed at the 1960 Summer Olympics.
