= Dieter Krickow =

German modern pentathlete

Personal information
- Born: 8 July 1936 (age 89) Berlin, Germany

Sport
- Sport: Modern pentathlon

Dieter Krickow (born 8 July 1936) is a German modern pentathlete. He competed at the 1961 Summer Olympics for the United Team of Germany.
