= Eero Lohi =

Finnish modern pentathlete (1927–2023)

Personal information
- Born: 14 August 1927 Ranua, Finland
- Died: 10 July 2023 (aged 95) Lieto, Finland

Sport
- Sport: Modern pentathlon

Eero Lohi (14 August 1927 – 10 July 2023) was a Finnish modern pentathlete. He competed at the 1960 Summer Olympics.

Lohi died on 10 July 2023, at the age of 95.
