= Giulio Giunta =

Italian modern pentathlete (1935–2010)

Personal information
- Born: 8 January 1935 Pesaro, Italy
- Died: 9 July 2010 (aged 75)

Sport
- Sport: Modern pentathlon

Giulio Giunta (8 January 1935 – 9 July 2010) was an Italian modern pentathlete. He competed at the 1960 Summer Olympics.
