= Kazimierz Paszkiewicz =

Polish modern pentathlete

Jarosław Paszkiewicz
Personal information
- Born: 12 February 1935 Poznań, Poland
- Died: 18 June 1980 (aged 45) Warsaw, Poland

Sport
- Sport: Modern pentathlon

Jarosław Paszkiewicz (12 February 1935 – 18 June 1980) was a Polish modern pentathlete. He competed at the 1960 Summer Olympics. He died in a car accident in 1980.
