= Peter Lichtner-Hoyer =

Austrian modern pentathlete (1925–2020)

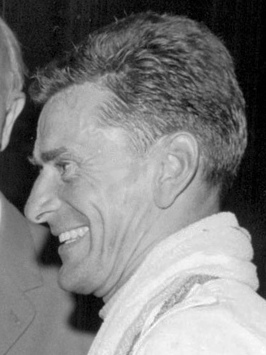
- Peter Lichtner-Hoyer in 1962

Personal information
- Born: 28 December 1925 Graz, Austria
- Died: 23 November 2020 (aged 94)

Sport
- Sport: Modern pentathlon

Peter Lichtner-Hoyer (28 December 1925 – 23 November 2020) was an Austrian sportsman and colonel.

== Career ==
During World War II, he was badly wounded, so the physicians thought he would never walk again. Nevertheless, he regained strength and took part in more than 1500 competitions as an equestrian and as a pentathlete and reached 1200 good placements. Lichtner-Hoyer took part in 24 world and European Championships.

== Olympic Games ==
- 1956 Summer Olympics in show jumping
- 1960 Summer Olympics in pentathlon

== Prizes ==
- 2010 Panathlon Würdigungspreis

== Works ==
- 1985 Cavalletti-Training, Rüschlikon-Zürich : Müller
- 1989 Der letzte Husar, Wien : J und V
- 1998 Cavalletti-Arbeit, Lüneburg : Cadmos
