= Kazimierz Mazur =

Polish modern pentathlete

Personal information
- Born: 8 February 1930 Czersk, Poland
- Died: 27 May 2000 (aged 70) Warsaw, Poland

Sport
- Sport: Modern pentathlon

Kazimierz Mazur (8 February 1930 – 27 May 2000) was a Polish modern pentathlete. He competed at the 1960 Summer Olympics.
