= Frank Battig =

Austrian fencer (1935–2015)

Personal information
- Born: 5 December 1935 Graz, Styria, Austria
- Died: 30 September 2015 (aged 79)

Sport
- Sport: Fencing, modern pentathlon

Frank Battig (5 December 1935 – 30 September 2015) was an Austrian fencer and modern pentathlete. He competed at the 1960 and 1968 Summer Olympics.
