= Werner Vetterli =

Swiss modern pentathlete

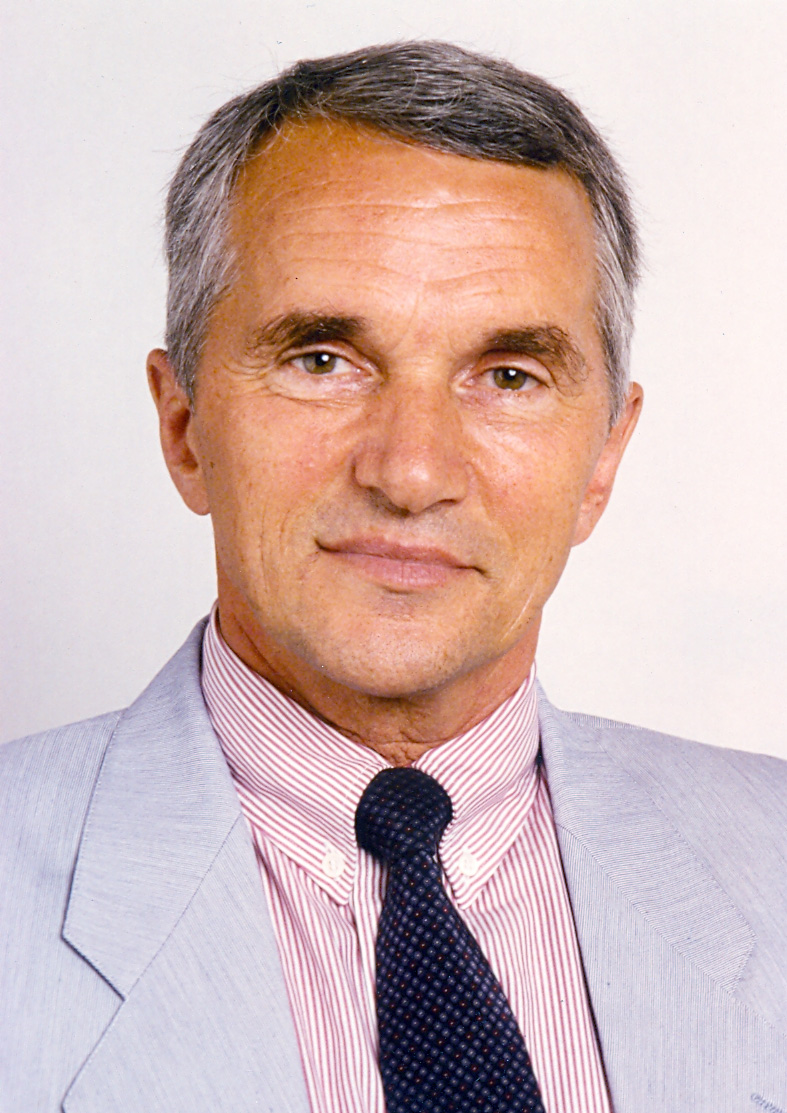

Personal information
- Born: 28 July 1928 Stäfa, Switzerland
- Died: 14 June 2008 (aged 79) Zürich, Switzerland

Sport
- Sport: Modern pentathlon

Werner Vetterli (28 July 1929 – 14 June 2008) was a Swiss modern pentathlete. He competed at the 1952 and 1960 Summer Olympics. In 1956, Vetterli began to work for Schweizer Radio DRS, in 1965 for Swiss television as a reporter, presenter and producer. Between 1969 and 1976, he was the Swiss presenter of the TV series Aktenzeichen XY… ungelöst.
