= Étienne Jalenques =

French modern pentathlete

Personal information
- Born: 10 December 1934 (age 91) Paris, France

Sport
- Sport: Modern pentathlon

Étienne Jalenques (born 10 December 1934) is a French modern pentathlete. He competed at the 1960 Summer Olympics.
