= Stanisław Przybylski =

Polish modern pentathlete

Personal information
- Born: 1 January 1931 Sosnowiec, Poland
- Died: 1 January 2010 (aged 79) Warsaw, Poland

Sport
- Sport: Modern pentathlon

Stanisław Przybylski (1 January 1931 – 1 January 2010) was a Polish modern pentathlete. He competed at the 1960 Summer Olympics.
