= Carlos Stricker =

Argentine modern pentathlete

Personal information
- Born: 2 October 1937 (age 88) Sunchales, Santa Fe, Argentina

Sport
- Sport: Modern pentathlon

Carlos Stricker (born 2 October 1937) is an Argentine modern pentathlete. He competed at the 1960 Summer Olympics.
