= Hugh Doherty (pentathlete) =

Australian modern pentathlete

Personal information
- Born: 21 March 1940 (age 86) Melbourne, Australia

Sport
- Sport: Modern pentathlon

Hugh Doherty (born 21 March 1940) is an Australian modern pentathlete. He competed at the 1960 Summer Olympics.
