= Gaetano Scala =

Italian modern pentathlete

Personal information
- Born: 6 December 1932 (age 93) Vico Equense, Italy

Sport
- Sport: Modern pentathlon

Gaetano Scala (born 6 December 1932) is an Italian modern pentathlete. He competed at the 1960 Summer Olympics.
