= Sture Ericson (pentathlete) =

Swedish modern pentathlete

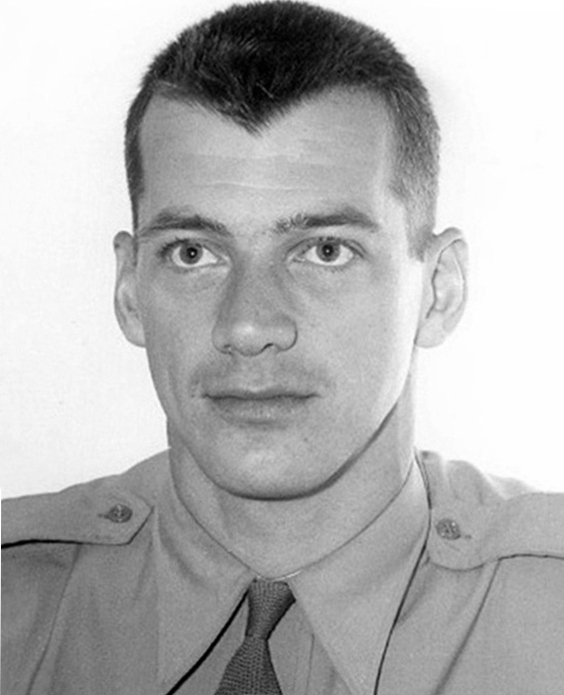

Personal information
- Born: 15 February 1929 Holm, Sweden
- Died: 26 August 1990 (aged 61) Sigtuna, Sweden
- Height: 190 cm (6 ft 3 in)
- Weight: 79 kg (174 lb)

Sport
- Sport: Modern pentathlon
- Club: A6 IF, Jönköping

Erik Sture Ericson (15 February 1929 – 26 August 1990) was a Swedish modern pentathlete who competed at the 1960 Summer Olympics. He finished 21st individually and sixth with the Swedish team.

Ericson was born in Holm parish, Västernorrland County.
