= Luis Ribera =

Argentine modern pentathlete

Personal information
- Full name: Luis Fernando Ribera
- Born: 15 April 1929 Chivilcoy, Argentina
- Died: 26 January 1979 (aged 49)

Sport
- Sport: Modern pentathlon

Luis Ribera (15 April 1929 – 26 January 1979) was an Argentine modern pentathlete. He competed at the 1952, 1956 and 1960 Summer Olympics.
