= Rolf Weber =

Swiss modern pentathlete

Personal information
- Born: 22 September 1934 (age 91) Bern, Switzerland

Sport
- Sport: Modern pentathlon

Rolf Weber (born 22 September 1934) is a Swiss modern pentathlete. He competed at the 1960 Summer Olympics.
