= Kara Grant =

Canadian modern pentathlete (born 1979)

Personal information
- Nationality: Canada
- Born: January 9, 1979 (age 47) Charlottetown, Prince Edward Island
- Height: 1.66 m (5 ft 5 1/2 in)
- Weight: 58 kg (128 lb)

Sport
- Sport: Modern pentathlon
- Club: Peps de l'Université Laval; Club Estoc
Medal record
Women's modern pentathlon
Representing Canada
Pan American Games
Bronze medal – third place	1999 Winnipeg	Individual
Pan American Championships
Gold medal – first place	1997	Team
Gold medal – first place	2001	Team
Bronze medal – third place	2002 Rio de Janeiro	Individual
Bronze medal – third place	2006 Mexico	Individual
African Championships
Silver medal – second place	2004 Cairo	Individual

Kara Grant (born January 9, 1979) is a two-time Olympic modern pentathlete from Canada. She is one of the first female Canadian modern pentathletes, along with Monica Pinette, to compete at the 2004 Summer Olympics in Athens, Greece.

Born and raised in Charlottetown, Prince Edward Island, Grant started out her sporting career in modern pentathlon at the age of sixteen. Although she joined in a local fencing club, Grant was intrigued by the challenge and variety of five different sporting disciplines (shooting, fencing, swimming, horse-riding, and running), which ultimately made her decision to try and accomplish the sport. In 1999, Grant received a qualifying berth for the Pan American Games in Winnipeg, Manitoba, where she took home the bronze medal for her national team. Following her well-accomplished result, she spent five years of training and competition before was able to break through into the international scene in 2002, when she added her first individual bronze medal at the Pan American Championships in Rio de Janeiro, Brazil. She also graduated from the University of Prince Edward Island with a Bachelor of Science degree in 2002

Grant qualified for the 2004 Summer Olympics in Athens, as one of the first female Canadian modern-pentathletes, and competed in the women's event, where she finished only in twenty-second place. She also produced her first top-ten finish at the 2006 World Modern Pentathlon Championships in Guatemala City, Guatemala, and nearly missed out the medal podium at the 2007 Pan American Games in Rio de Janeiro, finishing abruptly in fourth place. Following her highest achievements in the international scene, Grant competed at her second Olympics in Beijing in 2008, and finished thirty-first in the women's event.

Shortly after the Olympics, Grant retired from her sporting career, and worked as a motivational and public speaker.
