= Peter Little (pentathlete) =

British modern pentathlete (born 1933)

Personal information
- Full name: Peter Clince Little
- Born: 26 December 1933 (age 92) Wellington, Telford and Wrekin, Shropshire, England
- Height: 182 cm (6 ft 0 in)
- Weight: 72 kg (159 lb)

Sport
- Sport: Modern pentathlon

Peter Clince Little (born 26 December 1933) is a British modern pentathlete. He competed at the 1960 Summer Olympics in the modern pentathlon, finishing 26th individually and 7th in the team standings.
