= Donald Cobley =

British modern pentathlete

Personal information
- Born: 17 October 1928 Hinckley, Leicestershire, England
- Died: 4 February 1999 (aged 70)

Sport
- Sport: Modern pentathlon

Donald Cobley (17 October 1928 – 4 February 1999) was a British modern pentathlete. He competed at the 1956 and 1960 Summer Olympics.
