= Per-Erik Ritzén =

Swedish modern pentathlete

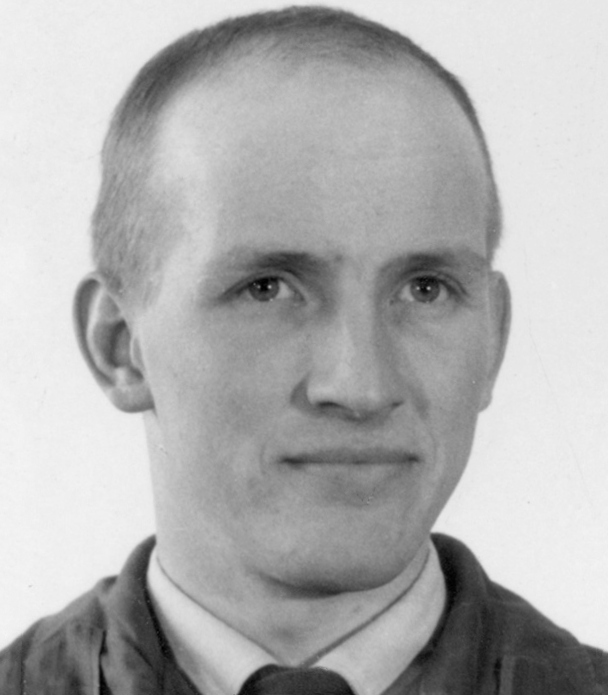

Personal information
- Born: 6 November 1934 (age 91) Malå, Sweden
- Height: 179 cm (5 ft 10 in)
- Weight: 72 kg (159 lb)

Sport
- Sport: Modern pentathlon
- Club: K1 IF, Stockholm

Per-Erik Ritzén (born 6 November 1934) is a Swedish modern pentathlete who competed at the 1960 Summer Olympics. He finished 15th individually and sixth with the Swedish team.
