= Kurt Lindeman =

Finnish fencer and modern pentathlete

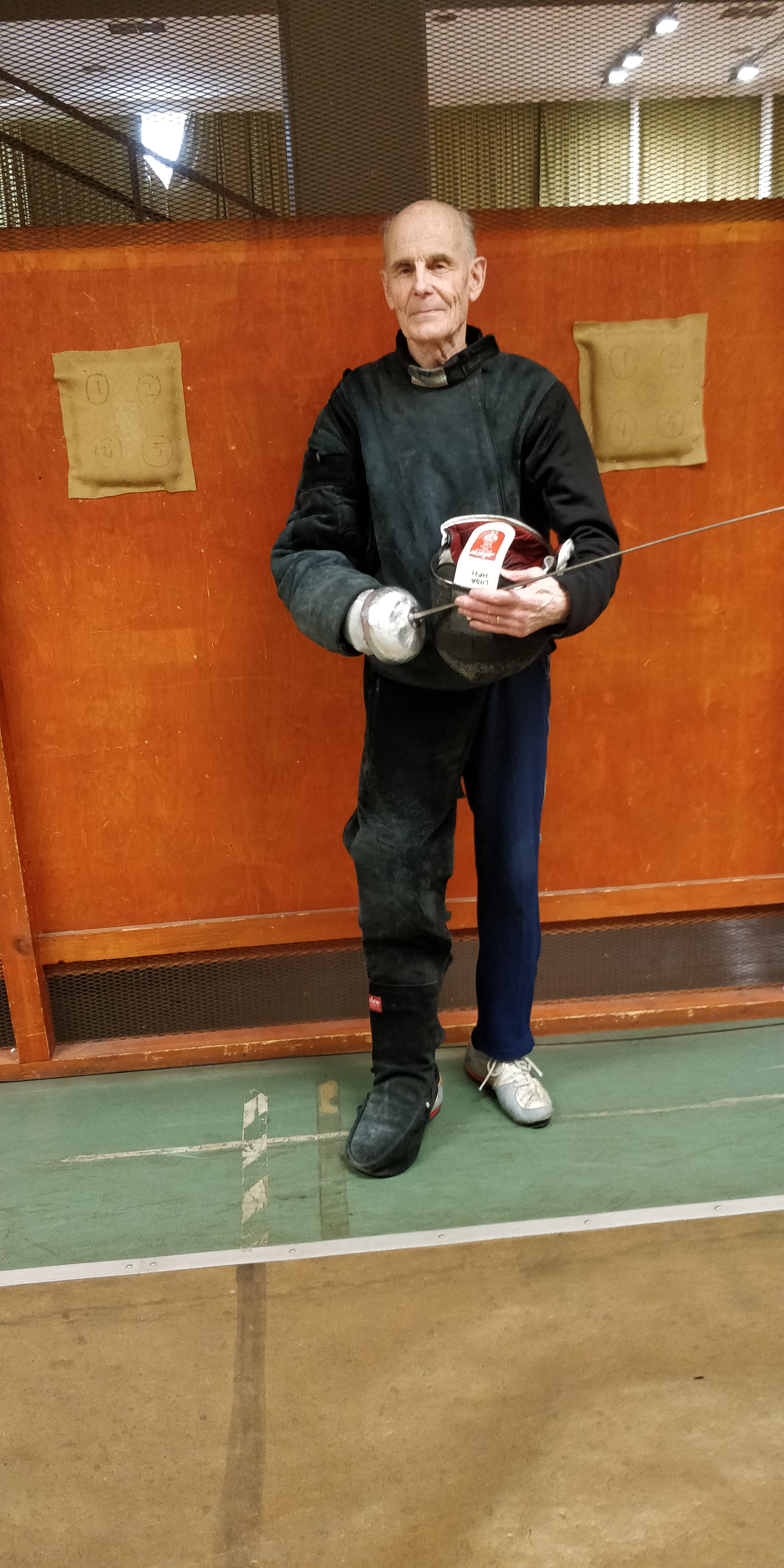

Personal information
- Born: 1 January 1932 (age 94) Helsinki, Finland

Sport
- Sport: Fencing, modern pentathlon

Kurt Lindeman (born 1 January 1932) is a Finnish épée and foil fencer and modern pentathlete. He competed at the 1952 and 1960 Summer Olympics.
