= Ralf Berckhan =

German sprint canoer (1931–1972)

Personal information
- Full name: Ralf Hugo Otto Berckhan
- Born: 2 October 1931 Hamburg, Germany
- Died: 20 August 1972 (aged 40) Hamburg, West Germany

Sport
- Sport: Modern pentathlon, canoe racing

Ralf Hugo Otto Berckhan (2 October 1931 – 20 August 1972) was a German sprint canoer who competed in the early 1950s and modern pentathlete who competed in the early 1960s. At the 1952 Summer Olympics in Helsinki, he finished sixth in the C-1 1000 m. Eight years later in Rome, Berckhan finished 55th in the individual event and 16th in the team event for the United Team of Germany. Berckhan died on 20 August 1972, at the age of 40.
