= George Lambert (pentathlete) =

American modern pentathlete (1928–2012)

Personal information
- Born: September 1, 1928 Hampton, Iowa, United States
- Died: January 30, 2012 (aged 83) River Falls, Wisconsin, United States

Sport
- Sport: Modern pentathlon
Medal record
Men's modern pentathlon
Representing United States
Olympic Games
| Silver medal – second place | 1956 Melbourne | Team |
| Bronze medal – third place | 1960 Rome | Team |

George Lambert (September 1, 1928 – January 30, 2012) was an American modern pentathlete who competed in the 1956 Summer Olympics and in the 1960 Summer Olympics.
