= Patrick Harvey (pentathlete) =

British modern pentathlete

Personal information
- Born: 28 November 1935 (age 90) Guildford, Surrey, England

Sport
- Sport: Modern pentathlon

Patrick Harvey (born 28 November 1935) is a British modern pentathlete. He competed at the 1960 Summer Olympics.
