= Adriano Facchini (pentathlete) =

Italian pentathlete (1927–1969)

Personal information
- Born: 6 February 1927 Pesaro, Italy
- Died: 20 July 1969 (aged 42)

Sport
- Sport: Modern pentathlon

Adriano Facchini (6 February 1927 – 20 July 1969) was an Italian modern pentathlete. He competed at the 1956 and 1960 Summer Olympics.
