= Antonio Almada =

Modern pentathlete and fencer (1931–2018)

Personal information
- Born: 26 April 1931 Navojoa, Mexico
- Died: November 2018 (aged 87)

Sport
- Sport: Modern pentathlon Fencing

Antonio Almada (26 April 1931 – November 2018) was a Mexican modern pentathlete and fencer. He competed in the modern pentathlon at the 1952, 1956 and 1960 Summer Olympics. He also competed in the épée fencing events at the 1960 Games.
