= Wenceslau Malta =

Brazilian modern pentathlete

Personal information
- Born: 15 December 1931 Santana do Livramento, Brazil
- Died: 27 January 2011 (aged 79) Rio de Janeiro, Brazil

Sport
- Sport: Modern pentathlon

Wenceslau Malta (15 December 1931 – 27 January 2011) was a Brazilian modern pentathlete and militar. He competed at the 1956 and 1960 Summer Olympics.
