= Björn Thofelt =

Swedish modern pentathlete

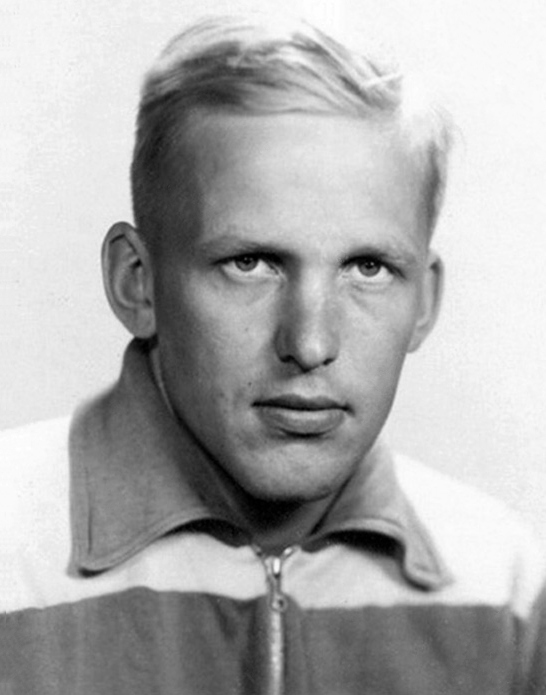

Personal information
- Nationality: Swedish
- Born: 12 June 1935 (age 91) Stockholm, Sweden
- Height: 184 cm (6 ft 0 in)
- Weight: 75 kg (165 lb)

Sport
- Country: Sweden
- Sport: Modern pentathlon
- Club: Djursholms IF
Medal record
Representing Sweden
World Championships
Gold medal – first place	1954 Budapest	Modern pentathlon, ind.
Bronze medal – third place	1954 Budapest	Modern pentathlon, team

Björn Thofelt (born 12 June 1935) is a former Swedish modern pentathlete. He won an individual world title in 1954 and finished third with the Swedish team. He also competed at the 1956 and 1960 Summer Olympics. In 1956, the Swedish team was a favorite, as it included the 1952 and 1956 Olympic champion Lars Hall. However, Thofelt had drawn the lot for a very peculiar horse in the equestrian event; he fell twice, suffered a concussion, and had to withdraw. At the 1960 Olympics he injured his hand, and finished 30th individually and sixth with the team.

His father Sven was the Olympic champion in modern pentathlon in 1928; he was also President of the Union Internationale de Pentathlon Moderne and the Swedish team leader at the 1956 Olympics.
