= Sergio Escobedo =

Mexican modern pentathlete (1931–2009)

Personal information
- Born: January 10, 1931 Mexico City, Mexico
- Died: May 10, 2009 (aged 78) Ciudad Juárez, Mexico

Sport
- Sport: Modern pentathlon, fencing

Sergio Escobedo (10 January 1931 – 10 May 2009) was a Mexican modern pentathlete and fencer. He competed in the modern pentathlon and the team épée at the 1960 Summer Olympics. He also served as a colonel in the Mexican army.
