= Justo Botelho =

Brazilian modern pentathlete

Personal information
- Born: Justo Santiago Botelho; 20 October 1935 (age 90) Minas Gerais, Brazil

Sport
- Sport: Modern pentathlon

Justo Botelho (born 20 October 1935) is a Brazilian modern pentathlete. He competed at the 1960 Summer Olympics.
