= José Wilson =

Brazilian modern pentathlete

Personal information
- Full name: José Pereira Wilson
- Born: 15 December 1931 (age 94) Ceará, Brazil

Sport
- Sport: Modern pentathlon

José Wilson (born 15 December 1931) is a Brazilian modern pentathlete. He competed at the 1960 and 1964 Summer Olympics.
