= André Bernard (pentathlete) =

French modern pentathlete (1935–2026)

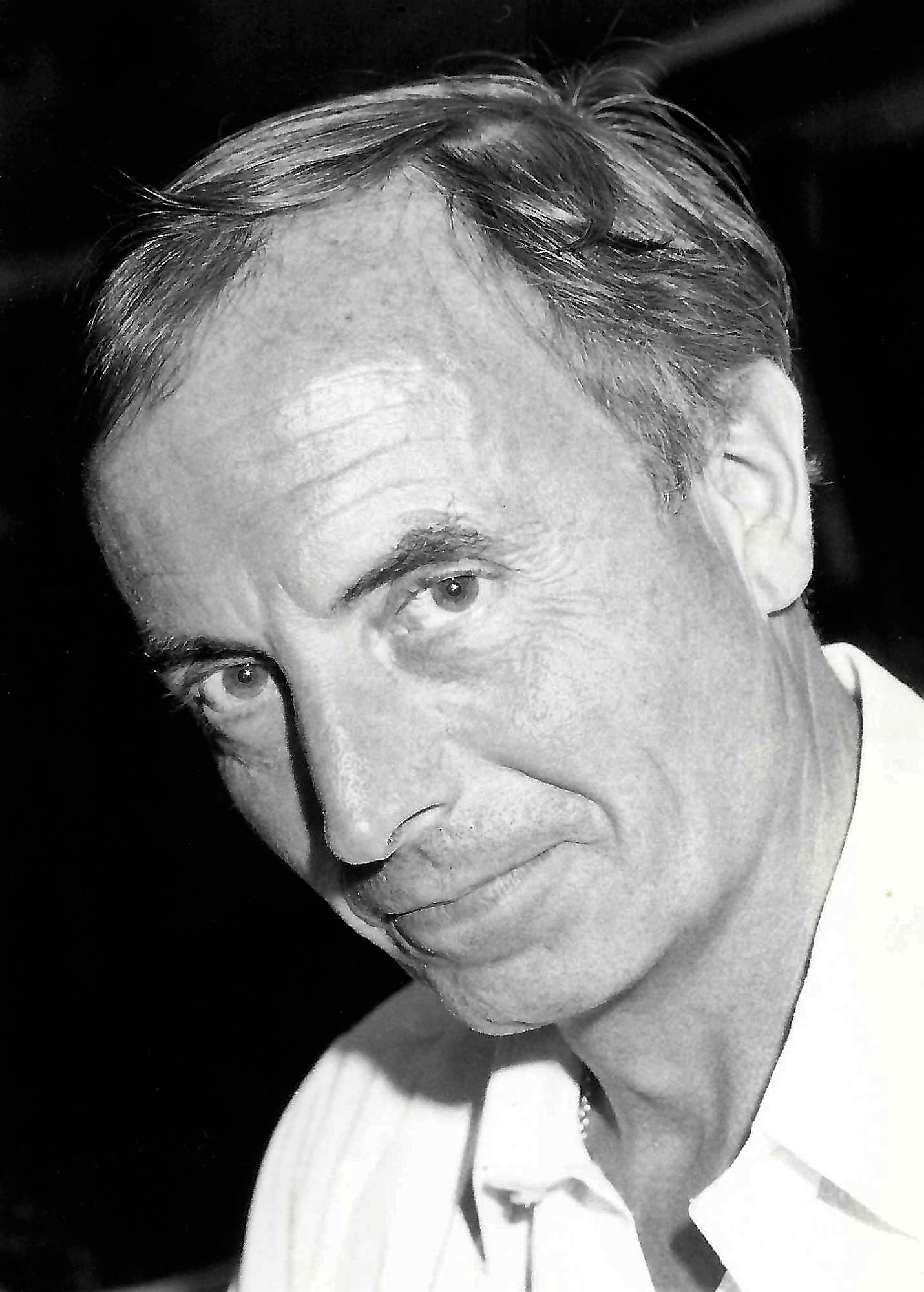

Personal information
- Born: 17 November 1935 Lille, France
- Died: 16 April 2026 (aged 90)

Sport
- Sport: Modern pentathlon

André Bernard (17 November 1935 – 16 April 2026) was a French modern pentathlete. He competed at the 1960 Summer Olympics.

Bernard died on 16 April 2026, at the age of 90.
