= José Pérez (pentathlete) =

Mexican modern pentathlete

Personal information
- Birth name: José Pérez Mier
- Born: 10 October 1928 (age 96); Morelia, Mexico

Sport
- Sport: Modern pentathlon Fencing

José Pérez Mier (born 10 October 1928) is a Mexican modern pentathlete and fencer. He competed in the modern pentathlon at the 1952, 1956 and 1960 Summer Olympics. He also competed in the team épée fencing event at the 1960 Games.
