= Lakdar Bouzid =

Tunisian modern pentathlete

Personal information
- Born: 4 January 1936 (age 90) Gafsa, Tunisia

Sport
- Sport: Modern pentathlon

Lakdar Bouzid (born 4 January 1936) is a Tunisian modern pentathlete. He competed at the 1960 Summer Olympics.
