= Habib Ben Azzabi =

Tunisian modern pentathlete (born 1937)

Personal information
- Born: 6 August 1937 (age 88) Tunis, Tunisia

Sport
- Sport: Modern pentathlon

Habib Ben Azzabi (born 6 August 1937) is a Tunisian modern pentathlete. He competed at the 1960 Summer Olympics in Rome, finishing seventeenth and fifty-seventh in the Team and Individual Modern Pentathlon events respectively.
