= Ahmed Ennachi =

Tunisian pentathlete

Personal information
- Born: 7 November 1935 (age 90) Tunis, Tunisia

Sport
- Sport: Modern pentathlon

Ahmed Ennachi (born 7 November 1935) is a Tunisian modern pentathlete. He competed at the 1960 Summer Olympics.

Ennachi is notable for having nearly drowned in the swimming portion of the modern pentathlon.
