= Finland at the Olympics =

- IOC code: FIN
- NOC: Finnish Olympic Committee
- Website: olympiakomitea.fi (in Finnish)
- Medals Ranked 17th: Gold 146 Silver 151 Bronze 189 Total 486

Summer appearances
- 1908; 1912; 1920; 1924; 1928; 1932; 1936; 1948; 1952; 1956; 1960; 1964; 1968; 1972; 1976; 1980; 1984; 1988; 1992; 1996; 2000; 2004; 2008; 2012; 2016; 2020; 2024; 2028

Winter appearances
- 1924; 1928; 1932; 1936; 1948; 1952; 1956; 1960; 1964; 1968; 1972; 1976; 1980; 1984; 1988; 1992; 1994; 1998; 2002; 2006; 2010; 2014; 2018; 2022; 2026

Other related appearances
- 1906 Intercalated Games

Finland first participated at the Olympic Games in 1908 and has sent athletes to compete in every Summer Olympic Games and every Winter Olympic Games since then. Finland was also the host nation for the 1952 Summer Olympics in Helsinki. Finnish athletes have won a total of 305 medals at the Summer Games, mostly in athletics and wrestling. Finland has also won 181 medals at the Winter Games, mostly in Nordic skiing events.

The National Olympic Committee for Finland is the Finnish Olympic Committee, and was created and recognized in 1907, when Finland was Grand Duchy of Finland, as an autonomous state within the Russian Empire. Finland earned medals at 50 straight Olympics Games between 1908 and 2022 until the country's first-ever Olympics without a medal 2024. Only its neighbouring country Sweden has reached a longer medalling streak, with one or more medals at every Olympic event since 1908 so far.

== Hosted Games ==
Finland has hosted the Games on one occasion.

Games	Host city	Dates	Nations	Participants	Events
1952 Summer Olympics	Helsinki	19 July – 3 August	69	4,955	149

=== Cancelled games ===
Games	Host city
1940 Summer Olympics	Helsinki

== Medals ==
=== Medals by Summer Games ===
Host country

Games	Athletes	Gold	Silver	Bronze	Total	Rank
(France) 1900 Paris	as part of Russian Empire					
(United States) 1904 St. Louis	did not participate					
(United Kingdom) 1908 London	67	1	1	3	5	13
(Sweden) 1912 Stockholm	164	9	8	9	26	4
(Belgium) 1920 Antwerp	63	15	10	9	34	4
(France) 1924 Paris	121	14	13	10	37	2
(Netherlands) 1928 Amsterdam	69	8	8	9	25	3
(United States) 1932 Los Angeles	40	5	8	12	25	7
(Germany) 1936 Berlin	108	7	6	6	19	5
(United Kingdom) 1948 London	129	8	7	5	20	6
(Finland) 1952 Helsinki	258	6	3	13	22	8
(Australia) 1956 Melbourne	64	3	1	11	15	13
(Italy) 1960 Rome	117	1	1	3	5	17
(Japan) 1964 Tokyo	89	3	0	2	5	12
1968 Mexico City	66	1	2	1	4	24
(Germany) 1972 Munich	96	3	1	4	8	14
(Canada) 1976 Montreal	83	4	2	0	6	11
(Soviet Union) 1980 Moscow	105	3	1	4	8	12
(United States) 1984 Los Angeles	86	4	2	6	12	15
(South Korea) 1988 Seoul	78	1	1	2	4	25
(Spain) 1992 Barcelona	88	1	2	2	5	29
(United States) 1996 Atlanta	76	1	2	1	4	40
(Australia) 2000 Sydney	70	2	1	1	4	31
(Greece) 2004 Athens	53	0	2	0	2	62
(China) 2008 Beijing	58	1	1	2	4	44
(United Kingdom) 2012 London	56	0	2	1	3	60
(Brazil) 2016 Rio de Janeiro	54	0	0	1	1	78
(Japan) 2020 Tokyo	45	0	0	2	2	85
(France) 2024 Paris	56	0	0	0	0	–
(United States) 2028 Los Angeles	future event					
(Australia) 2032 Brisbane	future event					
Total	2,359	101	85	119	305	16

=== Medals by Winter Games ===
Games	Athletes	Gold	Silver	Bronze	Total	Rank
(France) 1924 Chamonix	17	4	4	3	11	2
(Switzerland) 1928 St. Moritz	18	2	1	1	4	4
(United States) 1932 Lake Placid	7	1	1	1	3	5
(Germany) 1936 Garmisch-Partenkirchen	19	1	2	3	6	4
(Switzerland) 1948 St. Moritz	24	1	3	2	6	8
(Norway) 1952 Oslo	50	3	4	2	9	3
(Italy) 1956 Cortina d'Ampezzo	31	3	3	1	7	3
(United States) 1960 Squaw Valley	48	2	3	3	8	6
(Austria) 1964 Innsbruck	52	3	4	3	10	4
(France) 1968 Grenoble	52	1	2	2	5	10
(Japan) 1972 Sapporo	50	0	4	1	5	15
(Austria) 1976 Innsbruck	47	2	4	1	7	6
(United States) 1980 Lake Placid	52	1	5	3	9	7
(Socialist Federal Republic of Yugoslavia) 1984 Sarajevo	45	4	3	6	13	4
(Canada) 1988 Calgary	53	4	1	2	7	4
(France) 1992 Albertville	62	3	1	3	7	8
(Norway) 1994 Lillehammer	61	0	1	5	6	16
(Japan) 1998 Nagano	85	2	4	6	12	11
(United States) 2002 Salt Lake City	98	4	2	1	7	8
(Italy) 2006 Turin	102	0	6	3	9	19
(Canada) 2010 Vancouver	95	0	1	4	5	24
(Russia) 2014 Sochi	103	1	3	1	5	18
(South Korea) 2018 Pyeongchang	100	1	1	4	6	18
(China) 2022 Beijing	95	2	2	4	8	16
(Italy) 2026 Milano Cortina	103	0	1	5	6	23
(France) 2030 French Alps	future event					
(United States) 2034 Utah	future event					
Total	1,469	45	66	70	181	10

=== Medals by summer sport ===
Sport	Gold	Silver	Bronze	Total
Athletics	48	36	30	114
Wrestling	26	28	29	83
Gymnastics	8	5	12	25
Canoeing	5	2	3	10
Shooting	4	7	10	21
Rowing	3	1	3	7
Sailing	2	2	7	11
Boxing	2	1	13	16
Archery	1	1	2	4
Weightlifting	1	0	2	3
Modern pentathlon	0	1	4	5
Swimming	0	1	4	5
Totals (12 entries)	100	85	119	304

- This table does not include the gold medal won in figure skating at the 1920 Summer Olympics.

=== Medals by winter sport ===
Sport	Gold	Silver	Bronze	Total
Cross-country skiing	22	27	38	87
Ski jumping	10	8	4	22
Speed skating	7	8	9	24
Nordic combined	4	9	4	17
Ice hockey	1	2	9	12
Freestyle skiing	1	2	1	4
Figure skating	1	1	0	2
Biathlon	0	4	3	7
Snowboarding	0	2	2	4
Alpine skiing	0	1	0	1
Curling	0	1	0	1
Military patrol	0	1	0	1
Totals (12 entries)	46	66	70	182

- This table includes the gold medal won in figure skating at the 1920 Summer Olympics.
- Military patrol is considered to be the precursor to biathlon, however the official website of the Olympic Movement designates military patrol as a separate discipline. The Official Report of the 1924 Games regards it as an event within the sport of skiing.

== Summer and Winter Olympic medalists ==
=== Summer Olympics ===
Medal	Name	Games	Sport	Event
Gold	Verner Weckman	1908 London	Wrestling	Men's Greco-Roman light heavyweight
Silver	Yrjö Saarela	1908 London	Wrestling	Men's Greco-Roman light heavyweight
Bronze	Verner Järvinen	1908 London	Athletics	Men's Greek discus throw
Bronze	Eino Forsström; Otto Granström; Johan Kemp; Iivari Kyykoski; Heikki Lehmusto; John Lindroth; Yrjö Linko; Edvard Linna; Matti Markkanen; Kalle Mikkolainen; Veli Nieminen; Kalle Kustaa Paasia; Arvi Pohjanpää; Aarne Pohjonen; Eino Railio; Ale Riipinen; Arno Saarinen; Einar Sahlstein; Aarne Salovaara; Torsten Sandelin; Elis Sipilä; Viktor Smeds; Kaarlo Soinio; Kurt Stenberg; Väinö Tiiri; Magnus Wegelius	1908 London	Gymnastics	Men's team
Bronze	Arvo Linden	1908 London	Wrestling	Men's Greco-Roman lightweight
Gold	Hannes Kolehmainen	1912 Stockholm	Athletics	Men's 10,000 metres
Gold	Hannes Kolehmainen	1912 Stockholm	Athletics	Men's 5000 metres
Gold	Hannes Kolehmainen	1912 Stockholm	Athletics	Men's individual cross country
Gold	Armas Taipale	1912 Stockholm	Athletics	Men's discus throw
Gold	Armas Taipale	1912 Stockholm	Athletics	Men's two handed discus throw
Gold	Julius Saaristo	1912 Stockholm	Athletics	Men's two handed javelin throw
Gold	Kaarlo Koskelo	1912 Stockholm	Wrestling	Men's Greco-Roman featherweight
Gold	Emil Väre	1912 Stockholm	Wrestling	Men's Greco-Roman lightweight
Gold	Yrjö Saarela	1912 Stockholm	Wrestling	Men's Greco-Roman heavyweight
Silver	Hannes Kolehmainen; Jalmari Eskola; Albin Stenroos	1912 Stockholm	Athletics	Men's team cross country
Silver	Elmer Niklander	1912 Stockholm	Athletics	Men's two handed discus throw
Silver	Julius Saaristo	1912 Stockholm	Athletics	Men's javelin throw
Silver	Väinö Siikaniemi	1912 Stockholm	Athletics	Men's two handed javelin throw
Silver	Kaarlo Ekholm; Eino Forsström; Eero Hyvärinen; Mikko Hyvärinen; Tauno Ilmoniemi; Ilmari Keinänen; Jalmari Kivenheimo; Karl Lund; Aarne Pelkonen; Ilmari Pernaja; Arvid Rydman; Eino Saastamoinen; Aarne Salovaara; Heikki Sammallahti; Hannes Sirola; Klaus Suomela; Lauri Tanner; Väinö Tiiri; Kaarlo Vähämäki; Kaarlo Vasama	1912 Stockholm	Gymnastics	Men's team, free system
Silver	Harry Wahl; Waldemar Björkstén; Jacob Björnström; Bror Brenner; Allan Franck; Erik Lindh; Juho Aarne Pekkalainen	1912 Stockholm	Sailing	10 Metre class
Silver	Ivar Böhling	1912 Stockholm	Wrestling	Men's Greco-Roman light heavyweight
Silver	Johan Olin	1912 Stockholm	Wrestling	Men's Greco-Roman heavyweight
Bronze	Albin Stenroos	1912 Stockholm	Athletics	Men's 10,000 metres
Bronze	Urho Peltonen	1912 Stockholm	Athletics	Men's two handed javelin throw
Bronze	Elmer Niklander	1912 Stockholm	Athletics	Men's two handed shot put
Bronze	Ernst Krogius; Ferdinand Alfthan; Pekka Hartvall; Jarl Hulldén	1912 Stockholm	Sailing	12 Metre class
Bronze	Bertil Tallberg; Arthur Ahnger; Emil Lindh; Gunnar Tallberg; Georg Westling	1912 Stockholm	Sailing	8 Metre class
Bronze	Nestori Toivonen	1912 Stockholm	Shooting	Men's 100 metre running deer, single shots
Bronze	Axel Fredrik Londen; Nestori Toivonen; Iivar Väänänen; Ernst Rosenqvist	1912 Stockholm	Shooting	Men's 100 metre team running deer, single shots
Bronze	Otto Lasanen	1912 Stockholm	Wrestling	Men's Greco-Roman featherweight
Bronze	Alfred Asikainen	1912 Stockholm	Wrestling	Men's Greco-Roman middleweight
Gold	Paavo Nurmi	1920 Antwerp	Athletics	Men's 10,000 metres
Gold	Paavo Nurmi	1920 Antwerp	Athletics	Men's individual cross country
Gold	Paavo Nurmi; Heikki Liimatainen; Teodor Koskenniemi	1920 Antwerp	Athletics	Men's team cross country
Gold	Elmer Niklander	1920 Antwerp	Athletics	Men's discus throw
Gold	Jonni Myyrä	1920 Antwerp	Athletics	Men's javelin throw
Gold	Hannes Kolehmainen	1920 Antwerp	Athletics	Men's marathon
Gold	Eero Lehtonen	1920 Antwerp	Athletics	Men's pentathlon
Gold	Ville Pörhölä	1920 Antwerp	Athletics	Men's shot put
Gold	Vilho Tuulos	1920 Antwerp	Athletics	Men's triple jump
Gold	Ludowika Jakobsson; Walter Jakobsson	1920 Antwerp	Figure skating	Pairs
Gold	Kalle Anttila	1920 Antwerp	Wrestling	Men's freestyle lightweight
Gold	Eino Leino	1920 Antwerp	Wrestling	Men's freestyle middleweight
Gold	Oskari Friman	1920 Antwerp	Wrestling	Men's Greco-Roman featherweight
Gold	Emil Väre	1920 Antwerp	Wrestling	Men's Greco-Roman lightweight
Gold	Adolf Lindfors	1920 Antwerp	Wrestling	Men's Greco-Roman heavyweight
Silver	Paavo Nurmi	1920 Antwerp	Athletics	Men's 5000 metres
Silver	Armas Taipale	1920 Antwerp	Athletics	Men's discus throw
Silver	Urho Peltonen	1920 Antwerp	Athletics	Men's javelin throw
Silver	Elmer Niklander	1920 Antwerp	Athletics	Men's shot put
Silver	Yrjö Kolho; Kalle Lappalainen; Robert Tikkanen; Nestori Toivonen; Magnus Wegelius	1920 Antwerp	Shooting	Men's 100 metre team running deer, single shots
Silver	Väinö Penttala	1920 Antwerp	Wrestling	Men's freestyle middleweight
Silver	Heikki Kähkönen	1920 Antwerp	Wrestling	Men's Greco-Roman featherweight
Silver	Taavi Tamminen	1920 Antwerp	Wrestling	Men's Greco-Roman lightweight
Silver	Arthur Lindfors	1920 Antwerp	Wrestling	Men's Greco-Roman middleweight
Silver	Edil Rosenqvist	1920 Antwerp	Wrestling	Men's Greco-Roman light heavyweight
Bronze	Heikki Liimatainen	1920 Antwerp	Athletics	Men's individual cross country
Bronze	Paavo Johansson	1920 Antwerp	Athletics	Men's javelin throw
Bronze	Hugo Lahtinen	1920 Antwerp	Athletics	Men's pentathlon
Bronze	Yrjö Kolho; Robert Tikkanen; Nestori Toivonen; Vilho Vauhkonen; Magnus Wegelius	1920 Antwerp	Shooting	Men's 100 metre team running deer, double shots
Bronze	Voitto Kolho; Kalle Lappalainen; Veli Nieminen; Vilho Vauhkonen; Magnus Wegelius	1920 Antwerp	Shooting	Men's 300 metre team military rifle, prone
Bronze	Arvo Aaltonen	1920 Antwerp	Swimming	Men's 200 metre breaststroke
Bronze	Arvo Aaltonen	1920 Antwerp	Swimming	Men's 400 metre breaststroke
Bronze	Matti Perttilä	1920 Antwerp	Wrestling	Men's Greco-Roman middleweight
Bronze	Martti Nieminen	1920 Antwerp	Wrestling	Men's Greco-Roman heavyweight
Gold	Paavo Nurmi	1924 Paris	Athletics	Men's 1500 metres
Gold	Paavo Nurmi	1924 Paris	Athletics	Men's 5000 metres
Gold	Paavo Nurmi	1924 Paris	Athletics	Men's individual cross country
Gold	Ville Ritola	1924 Paris	Athletics	Men's 10,000 metres
Gold	Ville Ritola	1924 Paris	Athletics	Men's 3000 metres steeplechase
Gold	Elias Katz; Paavo Nurmi; Ville Ritola	1924 Paris	Athletics	Men's 3000 metres team race
Gold	Albin Stenroos	1924 Paris	Athletics	Men's marathon
Gold	Paavo Nurmi; Ville Ritola; Heikki Liimatainen	1924 Paris	Athletics	Men's team cross country
Gold	Jonni Myyrä	1924 Paris	Athletics	Men's javelin throw
Gold	Eero Lehtonen	1924 Paris	Athletics	Men's pentathlon
Gold	Kustaa Pihlajamäki	1924 Paris	Wrestling	Men's freestyle bantamweight
Gold	Kalle Anttila	1924 Paris	Wrestling	Men's Greco-Roman featherweight
Gold	Oskari Friman	1924 Paris	Wrestling	Men's Greco-Roman lightweight
Gold	Edvard Westerlund	1924 Paris	Wrestling	Men's Greco-Roman middleweight
Silver	Ville Ritola	1924 Paris	Athletics	Men's 5000 metres
Silver	Ville Ritola	1924 Paris	Athletics	Men's individual cross country
Silver	Erik Wilén	1924 Paris	Athletics	Men's 400 metres hurdles
Silver	Elias Katz	1924 Paris	Athletics	Men's 3000 metres steeplechase
Silver	Vilho Niittymaa	1924 Paris	Athletics	Men's discus throw
Silver	Konrad Huber	1924 Paris	Shooting	Men's trap
Silver	Kaarlo Mäkinen	1924 Paris	Wrestling	Men's freestyle bantamweight
Silver	Volmar Wikström	1924 Paris	Wrestling	Men's freestyle lightweight
Silver	Eino Leino	1924 Paris	Wrestling	Men's freestyle welterweight
Silver	Anselm Ahlfors	1924 Paris	Wrestling	Men's Greco-Roman bantamweight
Silver	Aleksanteri Toivola	1924 Paris	Wrestling	Men's Greco-Roman featherweight
Silver	Arthur Lindfors	1924 Paris	Wrestling	Men's Greco-Roman middleweight
Silver	Edil Rosenqvist	1924 Paris	Wrestling	Men's Greco-Roman heavyweight
Bronze	Eero Berg	1924 Paris	Athletics	Men's 10,000 metres
Bronze	Vilho Tuulos	1924 Paris	Athletics	Men's triple jump
Bronze	Hans Dittmar	1924 Paris	Sailing	Monotype class
Bronze	Lennart Hannelius	1924 Paris	Shooting	Men's 25 metre rapid fire pistol
Bronze	Werner Ekman; Konrad Huber; Robert Huber; Georg Nordblad; Toivo Tikkanen; Magnus Wegelius	1924 Paris	Shooting	Men's team clay pigeons
Bronze	Arvo Haavisto	1924 Paris	Wrestling	Men's freestyle lightweight
Bronze	Vilho Pekkala	1924 Paris	Wrestling	Men's freestyle middleweight
Bronze	Väinö Ikonen	1924 Paris	Wrestling	Men's Greco-Roman bantamweight
Bronze	Kalle Westerlund	1924 Paris	Wrestling	Men's Greco-Roman lightweight
Bronze	Onni Pellinen	1924 Paris	Wrestling	Men's Greco-Roman light heavyweight
Gold	Harri Larva	1928 Amsterdam	Athletics	Men's 1500 metres
Gold	Ville Ritola	1928 Amsterdam	Athletics	Men's 5000 metres
Gold	Paavo Nurmi	1928 Amsterdam	Athletics	Men's 10,000 metres
Gold	Toivo Loukola	1928 Amsterdam	Athletics	Men's 3000 metres steeplechase
Gold	Paavo Yrjölä	1928 Amsterdam	Athletics	Men's decathlon
Gold	Kaarlo Mäkinen	1928 Amsterdam	Wrestling	Men's freestyle bantamweight
Gold	Arvo Haavisto	1928 Amsterdam	Wrestling	Men's freestyle welterweight
Gold	Väinö Kokkinen	1928 Amsterdam	Wrestling	Men's Greco-Roman middleweight
Silver	Paavo Nurmi	1928 Amsterdam	Athletics	Men's 5000 metres
Silver	Paavo Nurmi	1928 Amsterdam	Athletics	Men's 3000 metres steeplechase
Silver	Ville Ritola	1928 Amsterdam	Athletics	Men's 10,000 metres
Silver	Antero Kivi	1928 Amsterdam	Athletics	Men's discus throw
Silver	Akilles Järvinen	1928 Amsterdam	Athletics	Men's decathlon
Silver	Kustaa Pihlajamäki	1928 Amsterdam	Wrestling	Men's freestyle featherweight
Silver	Aukusti Sihvola	1928 Amsterdam	Wrestling	Men's freestyle heavyweight
Silver	Hjalmar Nyström	1928 Amsterdam	Wrestling	Men's Greco-Roman heavyweight
Bronze	Eino Purje	1928 Amsterdam	Athletics	Men's 1500 metres
Bronze	Ove Andersen	1928 Amsterdam	Athletics	Men's 3000 metres steeplechase
Bronze	Martti Marttelin	1928 Amsterdam	Athletics	Men's marathon
Bronze	Vilho Tuulos	1928 Amsterdam	Athletics	Men's triple jump
Bronze	Heikki Savolainen	1928 Amsterdam	Gymnastics	Men's pommel horse
Bronze	Bertel Broman	1928 Amsterdam	Sailing	12' Dinghy class
Bronze	Eino Leino	1928 Amsterdam	Wrestling	Men's freestyle lightweight
Bronze	Edvard Westerlund	1928 Amsterdam	Wrestling	Men's Greco-Roman lightweight
Bronze	Onni Pellinen	1928 Amsterdam	Wrestling	Men's Greco-Roman light heavyweight
Gold	Volmari Iso-Hollo	1932 Los Angeles	Athletics	Men's 3000 metres steeplechase
Gold	Lauri Lehtinen	1932 Los Angeles	Athletics	Men's 5000 metres
Gold	Matti Järvinen	1932 Los Angeles	Athletics	Men's javelin throw
Gold	Hermanni Pihlajamäki	1932 Los Angeles	Wrestling	Men's freestyle featherweight
Gold	Väinö Kokkinen	1932 Los Angeles	Wrestling	Men's Greco-Roman middleweight
Silver	Heikki Savolainen	1932 Los Angeles	Gymnastics	Men's horizontal bar
Silver	Matti Sippala	1932 Los Angeles	Athletics	Men's javelin throw
Silver	Ville Pörhölä	1932 Los Angeles	Athletics	Men's hammer throw
Silver	Volmari Iso-Hollo	1932 Los Angeles	Athletics	Men's 10,000 metres
Silver	Akilles Järvinen	1932 Los Angeles	Athletics	Men's decathlon
Silver	Kyösti Luukko	1932 Los Angeles	Wrestling	Men's freestyle middleweight
Silver	Väinö Kajander	1932 Los Angeles	Wrestling	Men's Greco-Roman welterweight
Silver	Onni Pellinen	1932 Los Angeles	Wrestling	Men's Greco-Roman light heavyweight
Bronze	Bruno Ahlberg	1932 Los Angeles	Boxing	Men's welterweight
Bronze	Heikki Savolainen	1932 Los Angeles	Gymnastics	Men's artistic individual all-around
Bronze	Heikki Savolainen	1932 Los Angeles	Gymnastics	Men's parallel bars
Bronze	Einari Teräsvirta	1932 Los Angeles	Gymnastics	Men's horizontal bar
Bronze	Einari Teräsvirta; Heikki Savolainen; Martti Uosikkinen; Mauri Nyberg-Noroma; Ilmari Pakarinen	1932 Los Angeles	Gymnastics	Men's artistic team all-around
Bronze	Eino Penttilä	1932 Los Angeles	Athletics	Men's javelin throw
Bronze	Armas Toivonen	1932 Los Angeles	Athletics	Men's marathon
Bronze	Lauri Virtanen	1932 Los Angeles	Athletics	Men's 10,000 metres
Bronze	Lauri Virtanen	1932 Los Angeles	Athletics	Men's 5000 metres
Bronze	Aatos Jaskari	1932 Los Angeles	Wrestling	Men's freestyle bantamweight
Bronze	Eino Leino	1932 Los Angeles	Wrestling	Men's freestyle welterweight
Bronze	Lauri Koskela	1932 Los Angeles	Wrestling	Men's Greco-Roman featherweight
Gold	Gunnar Höckert	1936 Berlin	Athletics	Men's 5000 metres
Gold	Ilmari Salminen	1936 Berlin	Athletics	Men's 10,000 metres
Gold	Volmari Iso-Hollo	1936 Berlin	Athletics	Men's 3000 metres steeplechase
Gold	Kustaa Pihlajamäki	1936 Berlin	Wrestling	Men's freestyle featherweight
Gold	Lauri Koskela	1936 Berlin	Wrestling	Men's Greco-Roman lightweight
Gold	Sten Suvio	1936 Berlin	Boxing	Men's welterweight
Gold	Aleksanteri Saarvala	1936 Berlin	Gymnastics	Men's horizontal bar
Silver	Lauri Lehtinen	1936 Berlin	Athletics	Men's 5000 metres
Silver	Arvo Askola	1936 Berlin	Athletics	Men's 10,000 metres
Silver	Kaarlo Tuominen	1936 Berlin	Athletics	Men's 3000 metres steeplechase
Silver	Sulo Bärlund	1936 Berlin	Athletics	Men's shot put
Silver	Yrjö Nikkanen	1936 Berlin	Athletics	Men's javelin throw
Silver	Aarne Reini	1936 Berlin	Wrestling	Men's Greco-Roman featherweight
Bronze	Volmari Iso-Hollo	1936 Berlin	Athletics	Men's 10,000 metres
Bronze	Kalervo Toivonen	1936 Berlin	Athletics	Men's javelin throw
Bronze	Hjalmar Nyström	1936 Berlin	Wrestling	Men's freestyle heavyweight
Bronze	Hermanni Pihlajamäki	1936 Berlin	Wrestling	Men's freestyle lightweight
Bronze	Eino Virtanen	1936 Berlin	Wrestling	Men's Greco-Roman welterweight
Bronze	Martti Uosikkinen; Heikki Savolainen; Mauri Nyberg-Noroma; Aleksanteri Saarvala; Esa Seeste; Ilmari Pakarinen; Einari Teräsvirta; Eino Tukiainen	1936 Berlin	Gymnastics	Men's artistic team all-around
Gold	Lennart Viitala	1948 London	Wrestling	Men's freestyle flyweight
Gold	Tapio Rautavaara	1948 London	Athletics	Men's javelin throw
Gold	Veikko Huhtanen	1948 London	Gymnastics	Men's artistic individual all-around
Gold	Paavo Aaltonen; Veikko Huhtanen; Kalevi Laitinen; Olavi Rove; Aleksanteri Saarvala; Sulo Salmi; Heikki Savolainen; Einari Teräsvirta	1948 London	Gymnastics	Men's artistic team all-around
Gold	Paavo Aaltonen	1948 London	Gymnastics	Men's pommel horse
Gold	Veikko Huhtanen	1948 London	Gymnastics	Men's pommel horse
Gold	Heikki Savolainen	1948 London	Gymnastics	Men's pommel horse
Gold	Paavo Aaltonen	1948 London	Gymnastics	Men's vault
Silver	Kaisa Parviainen	1948 London	Athletics	Women's javelin throw
Silver	Erkki Kataja	1948 London	Athletics	Men's pole vault
Silver	Pauli Janhonen	1948 London	Shooting	Men's 300 metre free rifle, three positions
Silver	Kelpo Gröndahl	1948 London	Wrestling	Men's Greco-Roman light heavyweight
Silver	Kurt Wires	1948 London	Canoeing	Men's K-1 10,000 metres
Silver	Veikko Huhtanen	1948 London	Gymnastics	Men's parallel bars
Silver	Olavi Rove	1948 London	Gymnastics	Men's vault
Bronze	Reino Kangasmäki	1948 London	Wrestling	Men's Greco-Roman flyweight
Bronze	Thor Axelsson; Nils Björklöf	1948 London	Canoeing	Men's K-2 10,000 metres
Bronze	Thor Axelsson; Nils Björklöf	1948 London	Canoeing	Men's K-2 1000 metres
Bronze	Paavo Aaltonen	1948 London	Gymnastics	Men's artistic individual all-around
Bronze	Veikko Huhtanen	1948 London	Gymnastics	Men's horizontal bar
Gold	Kelpo Gröndahl	1952 Helsinki	Wrestling	Men's Greco-Roman light heavyweight
Gold	Pentti Hämäläinen	1952 Helsinki	Boxing	Men's bantamweight
Gold	Kurt Wires; Yrjö Hietanen	1952 Helsinki	Canoeing	Men's K-2 10000 metres
Gold	Kurt Wires; Yrjö Hietanen	1952 Helsinki	Canoeing	Men's K-2 1000 metres
Gold	Thorvald Strömberg	1952 Helsinki	Canoeing	Men's K-1 10000 metres
Gold	Sylvi Saimo	1952 Helsinki	Canoeing	Women's K-1 500 metres
Silver	Kalervo Rauhala	1952 Helsinki	Wrestling	Men's Greco-Roman middleweight
Silver	Thorvald Strömberg	1952 Helsinki	Canoeing	Men's K-1 1000 metres
Silver	Vilho Ylönen	1952 Helsinki	Shooting	Men's 50 metre rifle three positions
Bronze	Toivo Hyytiäinen	1952 Helsinki	Athletics	Men's javelin throw
Bronze	Tauno Kovanen	1952 Helsinki	Wrestling	Men's Greco-Roman heavyweight
Bronze	Leo Honkala	1952 Helsinki	Wrestling	Men's Greco-Roman flyweight
Bronze	Ilkka Koski	1952 Helsinki	Boxing	Men's heavyweight
Bronze	Harry Siljander	1952 Helsinki	Boxing	Men's light heavyweight
Bronze	Erkki Mallenius	1952 Helsinki	Boxing	Men's light welterweight
Bronze	Erkki Pakkanen	1952 Helsinki	Boxing	Men's lightweight
Bronze	Paavo Aaltonen; Kalevi Laitinen; Onni Lappalainen; Kaino Lempinen; Berndt Lindfors; Olavi Rove; Heikki Savolainen; Kalevi Viskari	1952 Helsinki	Gymnastics	Men's artistic team all-around
Bronze	Veikko Lommi; Kauko Wahlsten; Oiva Lommi; Lauri Nevalainen	1952 Helsinki	Rowing	Men's coxless four
Bronze	Olavi Ojanperä	1952 Helsinki	Canoeing	Men's C-1 1000 metres
Bronze	Ernst Westerlund; Paul Sjöberg; Ragnar Jansson; Adolf Konto; Rolf Turkka	1952 Helsinki	Sailing	6 Metre class
Bronze	Tauno Mäki	1952 Helsinki	Shooting	Men's 100 metre running deer
Bronze	Olavi Mannonen; Lauri Vilkko; Olavi Rokka	1952 Helsinki	Modern pentathlon	Men's team
Gold	Pentti Linnosvuo	1956 Melbourne	Shooting	Men's 50 metre pistol
Gold	Rauno Mäkinen	1956 Melbourne	Wrestling	Men's Greco-Roman featherweight
Gold	Kyösti Lehtonen	1956 Melbourne	Wrestling	Men's Greco-Roman lightweight
Silver	Olavi Mannonen	1956 Melbourne	Modern pentathlon	Men's individual
Bronze	Voitto Hellsten	1956 Melbourne	Athletics	Men's 400 metres
Bronze	Veikko Karvonen	1956 Melbourne	Athletics	Men's marathon
Bronze	Jorma Valkama	1956 Melbourne	Athletics	Men's long jump
Bronze	Pentti Hämäläinen	1956 Melbourne	Boxing	Men's featherweight
Bronze	Raimo Heinonen; Onni Lappalainen; Olavi Leimuvirta; Berndt Lindfors; Martti Mansikka; Kalevi Suoniemi	1956 Melbourne	Gymnastics	Men's artistic team all-around
Bronze	Wäinö Korhonen	1956 Melbourne	Modern pentathlon	Men's individual
Bronze	Berndt Katter; Wäinö Korhonen; Olavi Mannonen	1956 Melbourne	Modern pentathlon	Men's team
Bronze	Kauko Hänninen; Veli Lehtelä; Matti Niemi; Toimi Pitkänen; Reino Poutanen	1956 Melbourne	Rowing	Men's coxed four
Bronze	Vilho Ylönen	1956 Melbourne	Shooting	Men's 300 metre free rifle, three positions
Bronze	Erkki Penttilä	1956 Melbourne	Wrestling	Men's freestyle featherweight
Bronze	Taisto Kangasniemi	1956 Melbourne	Wrestling	Men's freestyle heavyweight
Gold	Eugen Ekman	1960 Rome	Gymnastics	Men's pommel horse
Silver	Pentti Linnosvuo	1960 Rome	Shooting	Men's 25 metre rapid fire pistol
Bronze	Eeles Landström	1960 Rome	Athletics	Men's pole vault
Bronze	Jorma Limmonen	1960 Rome	Boxing	Men's featherweight
Bronze	Veli Lehtelä; Toimi Pitkänen	1960 Rome	Rowing	Men's coxless pair
Gold	Pauli Nevala	1964 Tokyo	Athletics	Men's javelin throw
Gold	Pentti Linnosvuo	1964 Tokyo	Shooting	Men's 25 metre rapid fire pistol
Gold	Väinö Markkanen	1964 Tokyo	Shooting	Men's 50 metre pistol
Bronze	Pertti Purhonen	1964 Tokyo	Boxing	Men's welterweight
Bronze	Hannu Rantakari	1964 Tokyo	Gymnastics	Men's vault
Gold	Kaarlo Kangasniemi	1968 Mexico City	Weightlifting	Men's 90 kg
Silver	Jorma Kinnunen	1968 Mexico City	Athletics	Men's javelin throw
Silver	Olli Laiho	1968 Mexico City	Gymnastics	Men's pommel horse
Bronze	Arto Nilsson	1968 Mexico City	Boxing	Men's light welterweight
Gold	Pekka Vasala	1972 Munich	Athletics	Men's 1500 metres
Gold	Lasse Virén	1972 Munich	Athletics	Men's 5000 metres
Gold	Lasse Virén	1972 Munich	Athletics	Men's 10,000 metres
Silver	Reima Virtanen	1972 Munich	Boxing	Men's middleweight
Bronze	Tapio Kantanen	1972 Munich	Athletics	Men's 3000 metres steeplechase
Bronze	Kyösti Laasonen	1972 Munich	Archery	Men's individual
Bronze	Risto Hurme; Veikko Salminen; Martti Ketelä	1972 Munich	Modern pentathlon	Men's team
Bronze	Risto Björlin	1972 Munich	Wrestling	Men's Greco-Roman 57 kg
Gold	Lasse Virén	1976 Montreal	Athletics	Men's 5000 metres
Gold	Lasse Virén	1976 Montreal	Athletics	Men's 10,000 metres
Gold	Pertti Karppinen	1976 Montreal	Rowing	Men's single sculls
Gold	Pertti Ukkola	1976 Montreal	Wrestling	Men's Greco-Roman 57 kg
Silver	Hannu Siitonen	1976 Montreal	Athletics	Men's javelin throw
Silver	Antti Kalliomäki	1976 Montreal	Athletics	Men's pole vault
Gold	Tomi Poikolainen	1980 Moscow	Archery	Men's archery
Gold	Pertti Karppinen	1980 Moscow	Rowing	Men's single sculls
Gold	Esko Rechardt	1980 Moscow	Sailing	Finn class
Silver	Kaarlo Maaninka	1980 Moscow	Athletics	Men's 10,000 metres
Bronze	Päivi Meriluoto	1980 Moscow	Archery	Women's archery
Bronze	Kaarlo Maaninka	1980 Moscow	Athletics	Men's 5000 metres
Bronze	Mikko Huhtala	1980 Moscow	Wrestling	Men's Greco-Roman 74 kg
Bronze	Jouko Lindgren; Georg Tallberg	1980 Moscow	Sailing	470 class
Gold	Juha Tiainen	1984 Los Angeles	Athletics	Men's hammer throw
Gold	Arto Härkönen	1984 Los Angeles	Athletics	Men's javelin throw
Gold	Pertti Karppinen	1984 Los Angeles	Rowing	Men's single sculls
Gold	Jouko Salomäki	1984 Los Angeles	Wrestling	Men's Greco-Roman 74 kg
Silver	Tiina Lillak	1984 Los Angeles	Athletics	Women's javelin throw
Silver	Tapio Sipilä	1984 Los Angeles	Wrestling	Men's Greco-Roman 68 kg
Bronze	Arto Bryggare	1984 Los Angeles	Athletics	Men's 110 metres hurdles
Bronze	Joni Nyman	1984 Los Angeles	Boxing	Men's welterweight
Bronze	Rauno Bies	1984 Los Angeles	Shooting	Men's 25 metre rapid fire pistol
Bronze	Jouni Grönman	1984 Los Angeles	Weightlifting	Men's 67.5 kg
Bronze	Pekka Niemi	1984 Los Angeles	Weightlifting	Men's 100 kg
Bronze	Jukka Rauhala	1984 Los Angeles	Wrestling	Men's freestyle 68 kg
Gold	Tapio Korjus	1988 Seoul	Athletics	Men's javelin throw
Silver	Harri Koskela	1988 Seoul	Wrestling	Men's Greco-Roman 90 kg
Bronze	Seppo Räty	1988 Seoul	Athletics	Men's javelin throw
Bronze	Tapio Sipilä	1988 Seoul	Wrestling	Men's Greco-Roman 68 kg
Gold	Mikko Kolehmainen	1992 Barcelona	Canoeing	Men's K-1 500 metres
Silver	Ismo Falck; Jari Lipponen; Tomi Poikolainen	1992 Barcelona	Archery	Men's team
Silver	Seppo Räty	1992 Barcelona	Athletics	Men's javelin throw
Bronze	Jyri Kjäll	1992 Barcelona	Boxing	Men's light welterweight
Bronze	Antti Kasvio	1992 Barcelona	Swimming	Men's 200 metre freestyle
Gold	Heli Rantanen	1996 Atlanta	Athletics	Women's javelin throw
Silver	Jani Sievinen	1996 Atlanta	Swimming	Men's 200 metre individual medley
Silver	Marko Asell	1996 Atlanta	Wrestling	Men's Greco-Roman 74 kg
Bronze	Seppo Räty	1996 Atlanta	Athletics	Men's javelin throw
Gold	Arsi Harju	2000 Sydney	Athletics	Men's shot put
Gold	Jyrki Järvi; Thomas Johanson	2000 Sydney	Sailing	49er class
Silver	Juha Hirvi	2000 Sydney	Shooting	Men's 50 metre rifle three positions
Bronze	Marko Yli-Hannuksela	2000 Sydney	Wrestling	Men's Greco-Roman 76 kg
Silver	Marko Kemppainen	2004 Athens	Shooting	Men's skeet
Silver	Marko Yli-Hannuksela	2004 Athens	Wrestling	Men's Greco-Roman 74 kg
Gold	Satu Mäkelä-Nummela	2008 Beijing	Shooting	Women's trap
Silver	Minna Nieminen; Sanna Sten	2008 Beijing	Rowing	Women's lightweight double sculls
Bronze	Tero Pitkämäki	2008 Beijing	Athletics	Men's javelin throw
Bronze	Henri Häkkinen	2008 Beijing	Shooting	Men's 10 metre air rifle
Silver	Tuuli Petäjä	2012 London	Sailing	Women's RS:X
Silver	Antti Ruuskanen	2012 London	Athletics	Men's javelin throw
Bronze	Silja Kanerva; Silja Lehtinen; Mikaela Wulff	2012 London	Sailing	Women's Elliott 6m
Bronze	Mira Potkonen	2016 Rio de Janeiro	Boxing	Women's lightweight
Bronze	Matti Mattsson	2020 Tokyo	Swimming	Men's 200 metre breaststroke
Bronze	Mira Potkonen	2020 Tokyo	Boxing	Women's lightweight

=== Winter Olympics ===
Medal	Name	Games	Sport	Event
Gold	Clas Thunberg	1924 Chamonix	Speed skating	Men's 1500 metres
Gold	Clas Thunberg	1924 Chamonix	Speed skating	Men's 5000 metres
Gold	Julius Skutnabb	1924 Chamonix	Speed skating	Men's 10,000 metres
Gold	Clas Thunberg	1924 Chamonix	Speed skating	Men's all-round
Silver	Ludowika Jakobsson; Walter Jakobsson	1924 Chamonix	Figure skating	Pair skating
Silver	Väinö Bremer; August Eskelinen; Heikki Hirvonen; Martti Lappalainen	1924 Chamonix	Military patrol	Men's military patrol
Silver	Julius Skutnabb	1924 Chamonix	Speed skating	Men's 5000 metres
Silver	Clas Thunberg	1924 Chamonix	Speed skating	Men's 10,000 metres
Bronze	Tapani Niku	1924 Chamonix	Cross-country skiing	Men's 18 kilometre
Bronze	Clas Thunberg	1924 Chamonix	Speed skating	Men's 500 metres
Bronze	Julius Skutnabb	1924 Chamonix	Speed skating	Men's all-round
Gold	Clas Thunberg	1928 St. Moritz	Speed skating	Men's 1500 metres
Gold	Clas Thunberg	1928 St. Moritz	Speed skating	Men's 500 metres
Silver	Julius Skutnabb	1928 St. Moritz	Speed skating	Men's 5000 metres
Bronze	Jaakko Friman	1928 St. Moritz	Speed skating	Men's 500 metres
Gold	Veli Saarinen	1932 Lake Placid	Cross-country skiing	Men's 50 kilometre
Silver	Väinö Liikkanen	1932 Lake Placid	Cross-country skiing	Men's 50 kilometre
Bronze	Veli Saarinen	1932 Lake Placid	Cross-country skiing	Men's 18 kilometre
Gold	Kalle Jalkanen; Klaes Karppinen; Matti Lähde; Sulo Nurmela	1936 Garmisch-Partenkirchen	Cross-country skiing	Men's 4 × 10 kilometre relay
Silver	Birger Wasenius	1936 Garmisch-Partenkirchen	Speed skating	Men's 10,000 metres
Silver	Birger Wasenius	1936 Garmisch-Partenkirchen	Speed skating	Men's 5000 metres
Bronze	Pekka Niemi	1936 Garmisch-Partenkirchen	Cross-country skiing	Men's 18 kilometre
Bronze	Birger Wasenius	1936 Garmisch-Partenkirchen	Speed skating	Men's 1500 metres
Bronze	Antero Ojala	1936 Garmisch-Partenkirchen	Speed skating	Men's 5000 metres
Gold	Heikki Hasu	1948 St. Moritz	Nordic combined	Men's individual
Silver	August Kiuru; Teuvo Laukkanen; Sauli Rytky; Lauri Silvennoinen	1948 St. Moritz	Cross-country skiing	Men's 4 × 10 kilometre relay
Silver	Martti Huhtala	1948 St. Moritz	Nordic combined	Men's individual
Silver	Lassi Parkkinen	1948 St. Moritz	Speed skating	Men's 10,000 metres
Bronze	Benjamin Vanninen	1948 St. Moritz	Cross-country skiing	Men's 50 kilometre
Bronze	Pentti Lammio	1948 St. Moritz	Speed skating	Men's 10,000 metres
Gold	Veikko Hakulinen	1952 Oslo	Cross-country skiing	Men's 50 kilometre
Gold	Heikki Hasu; Urpo Korhonen; Paavo Lonkila; Tapio Mäkelä	1952 Oslo	Cross-country skiing	Men's 4 × 10 kilometre relay
Gold	Lydia Wideman	1952 Oslo	Cross-country skiing	Women's 10 kilometre
Silver	Tapio Mäkelä	1952 Oslo	Cross-country skiing	Men's 18 kilometre
Silver	Eero Kolehmainen	1952 Oslo	Cross-country skiing	Men's 50 kilometre
Silver	Mirja Hietamies	1952 Oslo	Cross-country skiing	Women's 10 kilometre
Silver	Heikki Hasu	1952 Oslo	Nordic combined	Men's individual
Bronze	Paavo Lonkila	1952 Oslo	Cross-country skiing	Men's 18 kilometre
Bronze	Siiri Rantanen	1952 Oslo	Cross-country skiing	Women's 10 kilometre
Gold	Veikko Hakulinen	1956 Cortina d'Ampezzo	Cross-country skiing	Men's 30 kilometre
Gold	Siiri Rantanen; Mirja Hietamies; Sirkka Polkunen	1956 Cortina d'Ampezzo	Cross-country skiing	Women's 3 × 5 kilometre relay
Gold	Antti Hyvärinen	1956 Cortina d'Ampezzo	Ski jumping	Men's normal hill individual
Silver	Veikko Hakulinen	1956 Cortina d'Ampezzo	Cross-country skiing	Men's 50 kilometre
Silver	August Kiuru; Jorma Kortelainen; Arvo Viitanen; Veikko Hakulinen	1956 Cortina d'Ampezzo	Cross-country skiing	Men's 4 × 10 kilometre relay
Silver	Aulis Kallakorpi	1956 Cortina d'Ampezzo	Ski jumping	Men's normal hill individual
Bronze	Toivo Salonen	1956 Cortina d'Ampezzo	Speed skating	Men's 1500 metres
Gold	Kalevi Hämäläinen	1960 Squaw Valley	Cross-country skiing	Men's 50 kilometre
Gold	Toimi Alatalo; Eero Mäntyranta; Väinö Huhtala; Veikko Hakulinen	1960 Squaw Valley	Cross-country skiing	Men's 4 × 10 kilometre relay
Silver	Antti Tyrväinen	1960 Squaw Valley	Biathlon	Men's individual
Silver	Veikko Hakulinen	1960 Squaw Valley	Cross-country skiing	Men's 50 kilometre
Silver	Niilo Halonen	1960 Squaw Valley	Ski jumping	Men's normal hill individual
Bronze	Veikko Hakulinen	1960 Squaw Valley	Cross-country skiing	Men's 15 kilometre
Bronze	Siiri Rantanen; Eeva Ruoppa; Toini Pöysti	1960 Squaw Valley	Cross-country skiing	Women's 3 × 5 kilometre relay
Bronze	Eevi Huttunen	1960 Squaw Valley	Speed skating	Women's 3000 metres
Gold	Eero Mäntyranta	1964 Innsbruck	Cross-country skiing	Men's 30 kilometre
Gold	Eero Mäntyranta	1964 Innsbruck	Cross-country skiing	Men's 15 kilometre
Gold	Veikko Kankkonen	1964 Innsbruck	Ski jumping	Men's normal hill individual
Silver	Väinö Huhtala; Kalevi Laurila; Eero Mäntyranta; Arto Tiainen	1964 Innsbruck	Cross-country skiing	Men's 4 × 10 kilometre relay
Silver	Mirja Lehtonen	1964 Innsbruck	Cross-country skiing	Women's 5 kilometre
Silver	Veikko Kankkonen	1964 Innsbruck	Ski jumping	Men's large hill individual
Silver	Kaija Mustonen	1964 Innsbruck	Speed skating	Women's 1500 metres
Bronze	Arto Tiainen	1964 Innsbruck	Cross-country skiing	Men's 50 kilometre
Bronze	Senja Pusula; Toini Pöysti; Mirja Lehtonen	1964 Innsbruck	Cross-country skiing	Women's 3 × 5 kilometre relay
Bronze	Kaija Mustonen	1964 Innsbruck	Speed skating	Women's 1000 metres
Gold	Kaija Mustonen	1968 Grenoble	Speed skating	Women's 1500 metres
Silver	Eero Mäntyranta	1968 Grenoble	Cross-country skiing	Men's 15 kilometre
Silver	Kaija Mustonen	1968 Grenoble	Speed skating	Women's 3000 metres
Bronze	Eero Mäntyranta	1968 Grenoble	Cross-country skiing	Men's 30 kilometre
Bronze	Kalevi Laurila; Eero Mäntyranta; Kalevi Oikarainen; Hannu Taipale	1968 Grenoble	Cross-country skiing	Men's 4 × 10 kilometre relay
Silver	Esko Saira; Juhani Suutarinen; Heikki Ikola; Mauri Röppänen	1972 Sapporo	Biathlon	Men's 4 x 7.5 Relay
Silver	Marjatta Kajosmaa	1972 Sapporo	Cross-country skiing	Women's 5 kilometre
Silver	Marjatta Kajosmaa; Hilkka Riihivuori; Helena Takalo	1972 Sapporo	Cross-country skiing	Women's 3 × 5 kilometre relay
Silver	Rauno Miettinen	1972 Sapporo	Nordic combined	Men's individual
Bronze	Marjatta Kajosmaa	1972 Sapporo	Cross-country skiing	Women's 10 kilometre
Gold	Matti Pitkänen; Juha Mieto; Pertti Teurajärvi; Arto Koivisto	1976 Innsbruck	Cross-country skiing	Men's 4 × 10 kilometre relay
Gold	Helena Takalo	1976 Innsbruck	Cross-country skiing	Women's 5 kilometre
Silver	Heikki Ikola	1976 Innsbruck	Biathlon	Men's individual
Silver	Henrik Flöjt; Esko Saira; Juhani Suutarinen; Heikki Ikola	1976 Innsbruck	Biathlon	Men's relay
Silver	Helena Takalo	1976 Innsbruck	Cross-country skiing	Women's 10 kilometre
Silver	Marjatta Kajosmaa; Hilkka Riihivuori; Liisa Suihkonen; Helena Takalo	1976 Innsbruck	Cross-country skiing	Women's 4 × 5 kilometre relay
Bronze	Arto Koivisto	1976 Innsbruck	Cross-country skiing	Men's 15 kilometre
Gold	Jouko Törmänen	1980 Lake Placid	Ski jumping	Men's large hill individual
Silver	Juha Mieto	1980 Lake Placid	Cross-country skiing	Men's 50 kilometre
Silver	Juha Mieto	1980 Lake Placid	Cross-country skiing	Men's 15 kilometre
Silver	Hilkka Riihivuori	1980 Lake Placid	Cross-country skiing	Women's 10 kilometre
Silver	Hilkka Riihivuori	1980 Lake Placid	Cross-country skiing	Women's 5 kilometre
Silver	Jouko Karjalainen	1980 Lake Placid	Nordic combined	Men's individual
Bronze	Harri Kirvesniemi; Pertti Teurajärvi; Matti Pitkänen; Juha Mieto	1980 Lake Placid	Cross-country skiing	Men's 4 × 10 kilometre relay
Bronze	Helena Takalo	1980 Lake Placid	Cross-country skiing	Women's 10 kilometre
Bronze	Jari Puikkonen	1980 Lake Placid	Ski jumping	Men's large hill individual
Gold	Marja-Liisa Hämäläinen	1984 Sarajevo	Cross-country skiing	Women's 20 kilometre
Gold	Marja-Liisa Hämäläinen	1984 Sarajevo	Cross-country skiing	Women's 10 kilometre
Gold	Marja-Liisa Hämäläinen	1984 Sarajevo	Cross-country skiing	Women's 5 kilometre
Gold	Matti Nykänen	1984 Sarajevo	Ski jumping	Men's large hill individual
Silver	Aki Karvonen	1984 Sarajevo	Cross-country skiing	Men's 15 kilometre
Silver	Jouko Karjalainen	1984 Sarajevo	Nordic combined	Men's individual
Silver	Matti Nykänen	1984 Sarajevo	Ski jumping	Men's normal hill individual
Bronze	Harri Kirvesniemi	1984 Sarajevo	Cross-country skiing	Men's 15 kilometre
Bronze	Juha Mieto; Aki Karvonen; Harri Kirvesniemi; Kari Ristanen	1984 Sarajevo	Cross-country skiing	Men's 4 × 10 kilometre relay
Bronze	Aki Karvonen	1984 Sarajevo	Cross-country skiing	Men's 50 kilometre
Bronze	Eija Hyytiäinen; Marja-Liisa Hämäläinen; Marjo Matikainen; Pirkko Määttä	1984 Sarajevo	Cross-country skiing	Women's 4 × 5 kilometre relay
Bronze	Jukka Ylipulli	1984 Sarajevo	Nordic combined	Men's individual
Bronze	Jari Puikkonen	1984 Sarajevo	Ski jumping	Men's normal hill individual
Gold	Matti Nykänen	1988 Calgary	Ski jumping	Men's normal hill individual
Gold	Marjo Matikainen	1988 Calgary	Cross-country skiing	Women's 5 kilometre classical
Gold	Matti Nykänen	1988 Calgary	Ski jumping	Men's large hill individual
Gold	Ari-Pekka Nikkola; Matti Nykänen; Jari Puikkonen; Tuomo Ylipulli	1988 Calgary	Ski jumping	Men's large hill team
Silver	Finland men's national ice hockey team: Timo Blomqvist; Kari Eloranta; Raimo Helminen; Iiro Järvi; Esa Keskinen; Erkki Laine; Kari Laitinen; Jukka Virtanen; Erkki Lehtonen; Jyrki Lumme; Reijo Mikkolainen; Jarmo Myllys; Teppo Numminen; Janne Ojanen; Arto Ruotanen; Reijo Ruotsalainen; Simo Saarinen; Kai Suikkanen; Timo Susi; Jukka Tammi; Jari Torkki; Pekka Tuomisto	1988 Calgary	Ice hockey	Men's tournament
Bronze	Marjo Matikainen	1988 Calgary	Cross-country skiing	Women's 10 kilometre classical
Bronze	Marja-Liisa Kirvesniemi; Marjo Matikainen; Pirkko Määttä; Jaana Savolainen	1988 Calgary	Cross-country skiing	Women's 4 × 5 kilometre relay
Gold	Marjut Lukkarinen	1992 Albertville	Cross-country skiing	Women's 5 kilometre classical
Gold	Toni Nieminen	1992 Albertville	Ski jumping	Men's large hill individual
Gold	Risto Laakkonen; Mika Laitinen; Toni Nieminen; Ari-Pekka Nikkola	1992 Albertville	Ski jumping	Men's large hill team
Silver	Marjut Lukkarinen	1992 Albertville	Cross-country skiing	Women's 15 kilometre classical
Bronze	Harri Eloranta	1992 Albertville	Biathlon	Men's sprint
Bronze	Jari Isometsä; Harri Kirvesniemi; Mika Kuusisto; Jari Räsänen	1992 Albertville	Cross-country skiing	Men's 4 × 5 kilometre relay
Bronze	Toni Nieminen	1992 Albertville	Ski jumping	Men's normal hill individual
Silver	Mika Myllylä	1994 Lillehammer	Cross-country skiing	Men's 50 kilometre classical
Bronze	Mika Myllylä	1994 Lillehammer	Cross-country skiing	Men's 30 kilometre freestyle
Bronze	Jari Isometsä; Harri Kirvesniemi; Mika Myllylä; Jari Räsänen	1994 Lillehammer	Cross-country skiing	Men's 4 × 5 kilometre relay
Bronze	Marja-Liisa Kirvesniemi	1994 Lillehammer	Cross-country skiing	Women's 30 kilometre classical
Bronze	Marja-Liisa Kirvesniemi	1994 Lillehammer	Cross-country skiing	Women's 5 kilometre classical
Bronze	Finland men's national ice hockey team: Mika Alatalo; Raimo Helminen; Erik Hämäläinen; Timo Jutila; Sami Kapanen; Esa Keskinen; Marko Kiprusoff; Petri Varis; Saku Koivu; Pasi Kuivalainen; Janne Laukkanen; Tero Lehterä; Jere Lehtinen; Jarmo Myllys; Mika Nieminen; Hannu Virta; Mikko Mäkelä; Janne Ojanen; Marko Palo; Ville Peltonen; Pasi Sormunen; Mika Strömberg; Jukka Tammi	1994 Lillehammer	Ice hockey	Men's tournament
Gold	Mika Myllylä	1998 Nagano	Cross-country skiing	Men's 30 kilometre classical
Gold	Jani Soininen	1998 Nagano	Ski jumping	Men's Normal hill individual
Silver	Janne Lahtela	1998 Nagano	Freestyle skiing	Men's moguls
Silver	Samppa Lajunen	1998 Nagano	Nordic combined	Men's individual
Silver	Samppa Lajunen; Hannu Manninen; Jari Mantila; Tapio Nurmela	1998 Nagano	Nordic combined	Men's team
Silver	Jani Soininen	1998 Nagano	Ski jumping	Men's large hill individual
Bronze	Ville Räikkönen	1998 Nagano	Biathlon	Men's sprint
Bronze	Mika Myllylä	1998 Nagano	Cross-country skiing	Men's 10 kilometre classical
Bronze	Jari Isometsä; Harri Kirvesniemi; Mika Myllylä; Sami Repo	1998 Nagano	Cross-country skiing	Men's 4 × 5 kilometre relay
Bronze	Sami Mustonen	1998 Nagano	Freestyle skiing	Men's moguls
Bronze	Finland men's national ice hockey team: Aki Berg; Tuomas Grönman; Raimo Helminen; Sami Kapanen; Saku Koivu; Jari Kurri; Janne Laukkanen; Antti Törmänen; Jere Lehtinen; Juha Lind; Jyrki Lumme; Jarmo Myllys; Mika Nieminen; Janne Niinimaa; Teppo Numminen; Juha Ylönen; Ville Peltonen; Kimmo Rintanen; Teemu Selänne; Ari Sulander; Jukka Tammi; Esa Tikkanen; Kimmo Timonen	1998 Nagano	Ice hockey	Men's tournament
Bronze	Finland women's national ice hockey team: Sari Fisk; Kirsi Hänninen; Satu Huotari; Marianne Ihalainen; Johanna Ikonen; Sari Krooks; Emma Laaksonen; Sanna Lankosaari; Katja Lehto; Marika Lehtimäki; Marja-Helena Pälvilä; Tuula Puputti; Karoliina Rantamäki; Katja Riipi; Päivi Salo; Maria Selin; Liisa-Maria Sneck; Petra Vaarakallio; Riikka Nieminen; Tiia Reima	1998 Nagano	Ice hockey	Women's tournament
Gold	Janne Lahtela	2002 Salt Lake City	Freestyle skiing	Men's moguls
Gold	Samppa Lajunen	2002 Salt Lake City	Nordic combined	Men's sprint
Gold	Samppa Lajunen	2002 Salt Lake City	Nordic combined	Men's individual
Gold	Jaakko Tallus; Jari Mantila; Hannu Manninen; Samppa Lajunen	2002 Salt Lake City	Nordic combined	Men's team
Silver	Jaakko Tallus	2002 Salt Lake City	Nordic combined	Men's individual
Silver	Janne Ahonen; Risto Jussilainen; Matti Hautamäki; Veli-Matti Lindström	2002 Salt Lake City	Ski jumping	Men's large hill team
Bronze	Matti Hautamäki	2002 Salt Lake City	Ski jumping	Men's large hill individual
Silver	Tanja Poutiainen	2006 Turin	Alpine skiing	Women's giant slalom
Silver	Markku Uusipaavalniemi; Wille Mäkelä; Kalle Kiiskinen; Teemu Salo; Jani Sullanmaa	2006 Turin	Curling	Men's tournament
Silver	Mikko Ronkainen	2006 Turin	Freestyle skiing	Men's moguls
Silver	Finland men's national ice hockey team: Aki Berg; Lasse Kukkonen; Toni Lydman; Antti-Jussi Niemi; Petteri Nummelin; Teppo Numminen; Sami Salo; Kimmo Timonen; Niklas Hagman; Jukka Hentunen; Olli Jokinen; Jussi Jokinen; Niko Kapanen; Saku Koivu; Mikko Koivu; Antti Laaksonen; Jere Lehtinen; Ville Nieminen; Ville Peltonen; Jarkko Ruutu; Teemu Selänne; Niklas Bäckström; Antero Niittymäki; Fredrik Norrena	2006 Turin	Ice hockey	Men's tournament
Silver	Matti Hautamäki	2006 Turin	Ski jumping	Men's normal hill individual
Silver	Janne Ahonen; Janne Happonen; Matti Hautamäki; Tami Kiuru	2006 Turin	Ski jumping	Men's large hill team
Bronze	Aino-Kaisa Saarinen; Virpi Kuitunen	2006 Turin	Cross-country skiing	Women's team sprint
Bronze	Antti Kuisma; Anssi Koivuranta; Jaakko Tallus; Hannu Manninen	2006 Turin	Nordic combined	Men's team
Bronze	Markku Koski	2006 Turin	Snowboarding	Men's halfpipe
Silver	Peetu Piiroinen	2010 Vancouver	Snowboarding	Men's halfpipe
Bronze	Pirjo Muranen; Virpi Kuitunen; Riitta-Liisa Roponen; Aino-Kaisa Saarinen	2010 Vancouver	Cross-country skiing	Women's 4 × 5 kilometre relay
Bronze	Aino-Kaisa Saarinen	2010 Vancouver	Cross-country skiing	Women's 30 kilometre classical
Bronze	Finland men's national ice hockey team: Niklas Bäckström; Valtteri Filppula; Niklas Hagman; Jarkko Immonen; Olli Jokinen; Niko Kapanen; Miikka Kiprusoff; Mikko Koivu; Saku Koivu; Lasse Kukkonen; Jere Lehtinen; Sami Lepistö; Toni Lydman; Antti Miettinen; Antero Niittymäki; Janne Niskala; Ville Peltonen; Joni Pitkänen; Jarkko Ruutu; Tuomo Ruutu; Sami Salo; Teemu Selänne; Kimmo Timonen	2010 Vancouver	Ice hockey	Men's tournament
Bronze	Finland women's national ice hockey team: Anne Helin; Jenni Hiirikoski; Venla Hovi; Michelle Karvinen; Mira Kuisma; Emma Laaksonen; Rosa Lindstedt; Terhi Mertanen; Heidi Pelttari; Mariia Posa; Annina Rajahuhta; Karoliina Rantamäki; Noora Räty; Mari Saarinen; Saija Sirviö; Nina Tikkinen; Minttu Tuominen; Saara Tuominen; Linda Välimäki; Anna Vanhatalo; Marjo Voutilainen	2010 Vancouver	Ice hockey	Women's tournament
Gold	Iivo Niskanen; Sami Jauhojärvi	2014 Sochi	Cross-country skiing	Men's team sprint
Silver	Enni Rukajärvi	2014 Sochi	Snowboarding	Women's slopestyle
Silver	Anne Kyllönen; Krista Pärmäkoski; Kerttu Niskanen; Aino-Kaisa Saarinen	2014 Sochi	Cross-country skiing	Women's 4 × 5 kilometre relay
Silver	Kerttu Niskanen; Aino-Kaisa Saarinen	2014 Sochi	Cross-country skiing	Women's team sprint
Bronze	Finland men's national ice hockey team: Juhamatti Aaltonen; Aleksander Barkov; Mikael Granlund; Juuso Hietanen; Jarkko Immonen; Jussi Jokinen; Olli Jokinen; Leo Komarov; Petri Kontiola; Lauri Korpikoski; Lasse Kukkonen; Jori Lehterä; Kari Lehtonen; Sami Lepistö; Olli Määttä; Antti Niemi; Antti Pihlström; Tuukka Rask; Tuomo Ruutu; Sakari Salminen; Sami Salo; Teemu Selänne; Kimmo Timonen; Sami Vatanen; Ossi Väänänen	2014 Sochi	Ice hockey	Men's tournament
Gold	Iivo Niskanen	2018 Pyeongchang	Cross-country skiing	Men's 50 kilometre classical
Silver	Krista Pärmäkoski	2018 Pyeongchang	Cross-country skiing	Women's 30 kilometre classical
Bronze	Krista Pärmäkoski	2018 Pyeongchang	Cross-country skiing	Women's 15 kilometre skiathlon
Bronze	Enni Rukajärvi	2018 Pyeongchang	Snowboarding	Women's slopestyle
Bronze	Krista Pärmäkoski	2018 Pyeongchang	Cross-country skiing	Women's 10 kilometre freestyle
Bronze	Finland women's national ice hockey team: Sanni Hakala; Jenni Hiirikoski; Venla Hovi; Mira Jalosuo; Michelle Karvinen; Rosa Lindstedt; Petra Nieminen; Tanja Niskanen; Emma Nuutinen; Isa Rahunen; Annina Rajahuhta; Meeri Räisänen; Noora Räty; Saila Saari; Ronja Savolainen; Eveliina Suonpää; Sara Säkkinen; Susanna Tapani; Noora Tulus; Minttu Tuominen; Ella Viitasuo; Riikka Välilä; Linda Välimäki	2018 Pyeongchang	Ice hockey	Women's tournament
Gold	Iivo Niskanen	2022 Beijing	Cross-country skiing	Men's 15 kilometre classical
Gold	Finland men's national ice hockey team: Miro Aaltonen; Marko Anttila; Hannes Björninen; Valtteri Filppula; Niklas Friman; Markus Granlund; Teemu Hartikainen; Juuso Hietanen; Valtteri Kemiläinen; Leo Komarov; Mikko Lehtonen; Petteri Lindbohm; Saku Mäenalanen; Sakari Manninen; Joonas Nättinen; Atte Ohtamaa; Niko Ojamäki; Juho Olkinuora; Iiro Pakarinen; Harri Pesonen; Ville Pokka; Toni Rajala; Harri Säteri; Frans Tuohimaa; Sami Vatanen	2022 Beijing	Ice hockey	Men's tournament
Silver	Kerttu Niskanen	2022 Beijing	Cross-country skiing	Women's 10 kilometre classical
Silver	Iivo Niskanen; Joni Mäki	2022 Beijing	Cross-country skiing	Men's team sprint
Bronze	Iivo Niskanen	2022 Beijing	Cross-country skiing	Men's 30 kilometre skiathlon
Bronze	Krista Pärmäkoski	2022 Beijing	Cross-country skiing	Women's 10 kilometre classical
Bronze	Finland women's national ice hockey team: Sanni Hakala; Jenni Hiirikoski; Elisa Holopainen; Sini Karjalainen; Michelle Karvinen; Anni Keisala; Nelli Laitinen; Julia Liikala; Eveliina Mäkinen; Petra Nieminen; Tanja Niskanen; Jenniina Nylund; Meeri Räisänen; Sanni Rantala; Ronja Savolainen; Sofianna Sundelin; Susanna Tapani; Noora Tulus; Minttu Tuominen; Viivi Vainikka; Sanni Vanhanen; Emilia Vesa; Ella Viitasuo	2022 Beijing	Ice hockey	Women's tournament
Bronze	Kerttu Niskanen	2022 Beijing	Cross-country skiing	Women's 30 kilometre freestyle
Silver	Eero Hirvonen; Ilkka Herola	2026 Milano Cortina	Nordic combined	Men's team large hill/2 × 7.5 km
Bronze	Eero Hirvonen	2026 Milano Cortina	Nordic combined	Men's individual normal hill/10 km
Bronze	Johanna Matintalo; Kerttu Niskanen; Vilma Ryytty; Jasmi Joensuu	2026 Milano Cortina	Cross-country skiing	Women's 4 × 7.5 kilometre relay
Bronze	Suvi Minkkinen	2026 Milano Cortina	Biathlon	Women's pursuit
Bronze	Ilkka Herola	2026 Milano Cortina	Nordic combined	Men's individual large hill/10 km
Bronze	Finland men's national ice hockey team: Sebastian Aho; Joel Armia; Mikael Granlund; Erik Haula; Miro Heiskanen; Roope Hintz; Henri Jokiharju; Kaapo Kakko; Oliver Kapanen; Joel Kiviranta; Joonas Korpisalo; Kevin Lankinen; Artturi Lehkonen; Mikko Lehtonen; Esa Lindell; Anton Lundell; Eetu Luostarinen; Olli Määttä; Nikolas Matinpalo; Niko Mikkola; Mikko Rantanen; Rasmus Ristolainen; Juuse Saros; Teuvo Teräväinen; Eeli Tolvanen	2026 Milano Cortina	Ice hockey	Men's tournament

== Summary by summer sports ==
=== Non-participations ===
Finland has participated in most summer sports, but they have yet to participate in: Baseball/Softball, Cricket, Handball, Lacrosse, Rugby football (neither Rugby sevens or the discontinued discipline Rugby union), Sport climbing, Surfing, Triathlon, Volleyball and Water polo.

Finland never participated in the following discontinued sports: Basque pelota, Breaking, Croquet, Jeu de paume, Karate, Polo, Rackets, Roque, Tug of war and Water motorsports.

=== Aquatics ===
For aquatics disciplines, follow these links: Artistic swimming, Diving, Swimming.

Finland has yet to participate in Water polo.

=== Archery ===
Archery was included in the Olympic programme four times between 1900 and 1920. It returned in 1972 and has remained in the Olympic programme ever since.

Games	Archers	Events	Gold	Silver	Bronze	Total	Ranking
1972 Munich	3	1/2	0	0	1	1	=4
1976 Montreal	2	1/2	0	0	0	0	
1980 Moscow	4	2/2	1	0	1	2	2
1984 Los Angeles	5	2/2	0	0	0	0	
1988 Seoul	6	4/4	0	0	0	0	
1992 Barcelona	3	2/4	0	1	0	1	=4
1996 Atlanta	3	2/4	0	0	0	0	
2000 Sydney	3	2/4	0	0	0	0	
2004 Athens	1	1/4	0	0	0	0	
2008 Beijing	1	1/4	0	0	0	0	
2016 Rio de Janeiro	2	2/4	0	0	0	0	
2020 Tokyo	1	1/5	0	0	0	0	
2024 Paris	1	1/5	0	0	0	0	
Total			1	1	2	4	=9

=== Artistic swimming ===
Artistic swimming has been included in the Olympic programme since 1984.

There are no men's events in the sport.

Games	Swimmers	Events	Gold	Silver	Bronze	Total	Ranking
1992 Barcelona	1	1/2	0	0	0	0	
Total			0	0	0	0	–

=== Athletics ===
Athletics has been included in the Olympic programme since the inaugural 1896 Summer Olympics.

Games	Athletes	Events	Gold	Silver	Bronze	Total	Ranking
1908 London	15	13/26	0	0	1	1	=12
1912 Stockholm	23	20/30	6	4	3	13	2
1920 Antwerp	26	18/29	9	4	3	16	2
1924 Paris	52	25/27	10	5	2	17	2
1928 Amsterdam	35	16/27	5	5	4	14	2
1932 Los Angeles	22	14/29	3	4	4	11	2
1936 Berlin	37	22/29	3	5	2	10	3
1948 London	36	19/33	1	2	0	3	8
1952 Helsinki	69	32/33	0	0	1	1	=19
1956 Melbourne	19	13/33	0	0	3	3	17
1960 Rome	26	18/34	0	0	1	1	=19
1964 Tokyo	17	12/36	1	0	0	1	=10
1968 Mexico City	10	10/36	0	1	0	1	=17
1972 Munich	32	23/38	3	0	1	4	5
1976 Montreal	31	19/37	2	2	0	4	5
1980 Moscow	26	18/38	0	1	1	2	=10
1984 Los Angeles	22	18/41	2	1	1	4	6
1988 Seoul	18	13/42	1	0	1	2	=10
1992 Barcelona	26	20/43	0	1	0	1	=24
1996 Atlanta	26	18/44	1	0	1	2	=15
2000 Sydney	23	15/46	1	0	0	1	=18
2004 Athens	23	17/46	0	0	0	0	
2008 Beijing	19	15/47	0	0	1	1	=39
2012 London	17	14/47	0	1	0	1	=27
2016 Rio de Janeiro	16	11/47	0	0	0	0	
2020 Tokyo	21	14/48	0	0	0	0	
2024 Paris	25	19/48	0	0	0	0	
Total			48	36	30	114	4

Finnish athletes also won 1 gold and 1 bronze medal in athletics at the 1906 Intercalated Games. IOC has retroactively decided to no longer recognize those games as official Olympic games.

=== Badminton ===
Badminton has been included in the Olympic programme since 1992.

Games	Players	Events	Gold	Silver	Bronze	Total	Ranking
1992 Barcelona	2	1/4	0	0	0	0	
1996 Atlanta	2	1/5	0	0	0	0	
2000 Sydney	2	1/5	0	0	0	0	
2004 Athens	3	2/5	0	0	0	0	
2008 Beijing	2	2/5	0	0	0	0	
2012 London	2	2/5	0	0	0	0	
2016 Rio de Janeiro	1	1/5	0	0	0	0	
2020 Tokyo	1	1/5	0	0	0	0	
2024 Paris	1	1/5	0	0	0	0	
Total			0	0	0	0	–

=== Basketball ===
==== 3x3 Basketball ====
3x3 basketball has been included in the Olympic programme since 2020.

Finland has yet to participate in the discipline.

==== Team basketball ====
Basketball has been included in the Olympic programme since 1936.

Games	Players	Events	Gold	Silver	Bronze	Total	Ranking
1952 Helsinki	11	1/1	0	0	0	0	
1964 Tokyo	12	1/1	0	0	0	0	
Total			0	0	0	0	–

=== Boxing ===
Boxing has been included in the Olympic programme since 1904 with the exception of 1912.

Games	Boxers	Events	Gold	Silver	Bronze	Total	Ranking
1928 Amsterdam	3	3/8	0	0	0	0	
1932 Los Angeles	2	2/8	0	0	1	1	=10
1936 Berlin	6	6/8	1	0	0	1	=5
1948 London	6	6/8	0	0	0	0	
1952 Helsinki	10	0/10	1	0	4	5	4
1956 Melbourne	3	3/10	0	0	1	1	=14
1960 Rome	7	7/10	0	0	1	1	=11
1964 Tokyo	5	5/10	0	0	1	1	=10
1968 Mexico City	5	5/11	0	0	1	1	=14
1972 Munich	4	4/11	0	1	0	1	=10
1976 Montreal	5	5/11	0	0	0	0	
1980 Moscow	5	5/11	0	0	0	0	
1984 Los Angeles	5	5/12	0	0	1	1	=14
1988 Seoul	3	3/12	0	0	0	0	
1992 Barcelona	1	1/12	0	0	1	1	=14
2000 Sydney	1	1/12	0	0	0	0	
2016 Rio de Janeiro	1	1/13	0	0	1	1	=14
2020 Tokyo	1	1/13	0	0	1	1	=15
2024 Paris	1	1/13	0	0	0	0	
Total			2	1	13	16	29

=== Canoeing ===
==== Slalom ====
Canoe slalom was first included in the Olympic programme in 1972. It returned in 1992 and has remained in the programme since then.

Finland has yet to participate in the discipline.

==== Sprint ====
Canoe sprint (including the discontinued discipline canoe marathon) has been included in the Olympic programme since 1936.

Games	Canoeists	Events	Gold	Silver	Bronze	Total	Ranking
1936 Berlin	3	3/9	0	0	0	0	
1948 London	5	5/9	0	1	2	3	5
1952 Helsinki	10	9/9	4	1	1	6	1
1956 Melbourne	6	5/9	0	0	0	0	
1960 Rome	9	5/7	0	0	0	0	
1964 Tokyo	3	2/7	0	0	0	0	
1968 Mexico City	5	3/7	0	0	0	0	
1972 Munich	4	2/7	0	0	0	0	
1976 Montreal	7	5/11	0	0	0	0	
1980 Moscow	4	6/11	0	0	0	0	
1984 Los Angeles	5	5/12	0	0	0	0	
1988 Seoul	3	4/12	0	0	0	0	
1992 Barcelona	2	2/12	1	0	0	1	
1996 Atlanta	1	2/12	0	0	0	0	
2000 Sydney	1	1/12	0	0	0	0	
2004 Athens	2	2/12	0	0	0	0	
2008 Beijing	4	4/12	0	0	0	0	
2012 London	2	2/12	0	0	0	0	
Total			5	2	3	10	13

=== Cycling ===
==== BMX freestyle ====
BMX freestyle has been included in the Olympic programme since 2020.

Finland has yet to participate in the discipline.

==== BMX racing ====
BMX racing has been included in the Olympic programme since 2008.

Finland has yet to participate in the discipline.

==== Mountain biking ====
Mountain biking has been included in the Olympic programme since 1996.

Games	Cyclists	Events	Gold	Silver	Bronze	Total	Ranking
2024 Paris	1	1/2	0	0	0	0	
Total			0	0	0	0	–

==== Road cycling ====
Road cycling was included in the Olympic programme in 1896. It returned in 1912 and has remained in the Olympic programme ever since.

Games	Cyclists	Events	Gold	Silver	Bronze	Total	Ranking
1912 Stockholm	5	2/2	0	0	0	0	
1924 Paris	4	2/2	0	0	0	0	
1928 Amsterdam	1	1/2	0	0	0	0	
1936 Berlin	2	1/2	0	0	0	0	
1948 London	3	2/2	0	0	0	0	
1952 Helsinki	4	2/2	0	0	0	0	
1956 Melbourne	1	1/2	0	0	0	0	
1960 Rome	4	2/2	0	0	0	0	
1968 Mexico City	4	2/2	0	0	0	0	
1972 Munich	5	2/2	0	0	0	0	
1976 Montreal	1	1/2	0	0	0	0	
1980 Moscow	5	2/2	0	0	0	0	
1984 Los Angeles	5	2/3	0	0	0	0	
1988 Seoul	2	2/3	0	0	0	0	
1992 Barcelona	1	1/3	0	0	0	0	
1996 Atlanta	3	3/4	0	0	0	0	
2000 Sydney	1	1/4	0	0	0	0	
2012 London	2	3/4	0	0	0	0	
2016 Rio de Janeiro	1	2/4	0	0	0	0	
2024 Paris	1	2/4	0	0	0	0	
Total			0	0	0	0	–

==== Track cycling ====
Track cycling was included in the inaugural 1896 Summer Olympic programme and has been included in all Summer Games except for 1912.

Games	Cyclists	Events	Gold	Silver	Bronze	Total	Ranking
1936 Berlin	1	1/4	0	0	0	0	
1948 London	4	2/4	0	0	0	0	
1952 Helsinki	8	4/4	0	0	0	0	
1956 Melbourne	1	2/4	0	0	0	0	
1960 Rome	1	2/4	0	0	0	0	
1968 Mexico City	2	2/5	0	0	0	0	
1972 Munich	1	1/5	0	0	0	0	
1976 Montreal	1	1/4	0	0	0	0	
1980 Moscow	1	1/4	0	0	0	0	
1984 Los Angeles	1	1/5	0	0	0	0	
1988 Seoul	2	2/6	0	0	0	0	
1992 Barcelona	2	2/7	0	0	0	0	
1996 Atlanta	3	3/8	0	0	0	0	
2000 Sydney	1	2/12	0	0	0	0	
Total			0	0	0	0	–

=== Diving ===
Diving has been included in the Olympic programme since 1904.

Games	Divers	Events	Gold	Silver	Bronze	Total	Ranking
1908 London	2	2/2	0	0	0	0	
1912 Stockholm	6	3/4	0	0	0	0	
1920 Antwerp	3	2/5	0	0	0	0	
1924 Paris	6	3/5	0	0	0	0	
1928 Amsterdam	2	2/4	0	0	0	0	
1936 Berlin	1	2/4	0	0	0	0	
1948 London	1	1/4	0	0	0	0	
1952 Helsinki	3	2/4	0	0	0	0	
1956 Melbourne	1	2/4	0	0	0	0	
1960 Rome	1	1/4	0	0	0	0	
1964 Tokyo	1	1/4	0	0	0	0	
1968 Mexico City	2	3/4	0	0	0	0	
1972 Munich	2	3/4	0	0	0	0	
1984 Los Angeles	1	1/4	0	0	0	0	
1988 Seoul	1	1/4	0	0	0	0	
2000 Sydney	2	1/8	0	0	0	0	
2004 Athens	2	1/8	0	0	0	0	
2008 Beijing	1	1/8	0	0	0	0	
Total			0	0	0	0	–

=== Equestrian ===
==== Dressage ====
Dressage had one event included in 1900. It returned to the Olympic programme in 1912 and has remained in the Olympic programme ever since.

Games	Riders	Events	Gold	Silver	Bronze	Total	Ranking
1956 Melbourne / Stockholm	1	1/2	0	0	0	0	
1980 Moscow	1	1/2	0	0	0	0	
1984 Los Angeles	1	1/2	0	0	0	0	
1988 Seoul	4	2/2	0	0	0	0	
1992 Barcelona	1	1/2	0	0	0	0	
1996 Atlanta	1	1/2	0	0	0	0	
2000 Sydney	2	1/2	0	0	0	0	
2008 Beijing / Hong Kong	1	1/2	0	0	0	0	
2012 London	2	1/2	0	0	0	0	
2020 Tokyo	1	1/2	0	0	0	0	
2024 Paris	3	2/2	0	0	0	0	
Total			0	0	0	0	–

==== Eventing ====
Eventing has been included in the Olympic programme since 1912.

Games	Riders	Events	Gold	Silver	Bronze	Total	Ranking
1920 Antwerp	1	1/2	0	0	0	0	
1924 Paris	1	1/2	0	0	0	0	
1928 Amsterdam	1	1/2	0	0	0	0	
1936 Berlin	1	1/2	0	0	0	0	
1948 London	3	2/2	0	0	0	0	
1952 Helsinki	3	2/2	0	0	0	0	
1956 Melbourne / Stockholm	3	2/2	0	0	0	0	
2000 Sydney	1	1/2	0	0	0	0	
2016 Rio de Janeiro	1	1/2	0	0	0	0	
2024 Paris	2	1/2	0	0	0	0	
Total			0	0	0	0	–

==== Show jumping ====
Show Jumping was included in the Olympic programme in 1900. It returned in 1912 and has remained in the Olympic programme ever since.

Games	Riders	Events	Gold	Silver	Bronze	Total	Ranking
1948 London	2	1/2	0	0	0	0	
1952 Helsinki	3	2/2	0	0	0	0	
1956 Melbourne / Stockholm	3	2/2	0	0	0	0	
1980 Moscow	1	1/2	0	0	0	0	
Total			0	0	0	0	–

==== Discontinued disciplines ====
Equestrian driving was conducted during the 1900 Summer Olympics and equestrian vaulting during the 1920 Summer Olympics.

Finland did not participate in either discipline.

=== Fencing ===
Fencing has been included in the Olympic programme since the inaugural 1896 Games.

Games	Fencers	Events	Gold	Silver	Bronze	Total	Ranking
1928 Amsterdam	2	2/7	0	0	0	0	
1948 London	6	5/7	0	0	0	0	
1952 Helsinki	11	4/7	0	0	0	0	
1956 Melbourne	2	1/7	0	0	0	0	
1960 Rome	6	3/8	0	0	0	0	
1972 Munich	1	1/8	0	0	0	0	
1976 Montreal	4	2/8	0	0	0	0	
1980 Moscow	5	2/8	0	0	0	0	
1988 Seoul	1	1/8	0	0	0	0	
1996 Atlanta	1	1/10	0	0	0	0	
Total			0	0	0	0	–

=== Field hockey ===
Field hockey was first included in the Olympic programme in 1908. It returned in 1920 before becoming a permanent Olympic sport in 1928.

Games	Players	Events	Gold	Silver	Bronze	Total	Ranking
1952 Helsinki	11	1/1	0	0	0	0	
Total			0	0	0	0	–

=== Football ===
Football has been included in the Olympic programme since 1900 with the exception of 1932.

Games	Footballers	Events	Gold	Silver	Bronze	Total	Ranking
1912 Stockholm	13	1/1	0	0	0	0	
1936 Berlin	11	1/1	0	0	0	0	
1952 Helsinki	11	1/1	0	0	0	0	
1980 Moscow	16	1/1	0	0	0	0	
Total			0	0	0	0	–

=== Golf ===
Golf was included in the Olympic programme in 1900 and 1904. It returned in 2016 and has remained in the Olympic programme ever since.

Games	Players	Events	Gold	Silver	Bronze	Total	Ranking
2016 Rio de Janeiro	4	2/2	0	0	0	0	
2020 Tokyo	4	2/2	0	0	0	0	
2024 Paris	4	2/2	0	0	0	0	
Total			0	0	0	0	–

=== Gymnastics ===
==== Artistic gymnastics ====
Artistic gymnastics has been included in the Summer Olympic programme since the inaugural 1896 Games.

Games	Gymnasts	Events	Gold	Silver	Bronze	Total	Ranking
1908 London	31	2/2	0	0	1	1	=5
1912 Stockholm	24	2/4	0	1	0	1	=5
1924 Paris	8	9/9	0	0	0	0	
1928 Amsterdam	8	7/8	0	0	1	1	=6
1932 Los Angeles	5	8/11	0	1	4	5	4
1936 Berlin	8	8/9	1	0	1	2	4
1948 London	8	8/9	6	2	2	8	1
1952 Helsinki	16	15/15	0	0	1	1	=8
1956 Melbourne	6	8/15	0	0	1	1	=8
1960 Rome	12	14/14	1	0	0	1	4
1964 Tokyo	8	13/14	0	0	1	1	8
1968 Mexico City	6	8/14	0	1	0	1	6
1972 Munich	1	7/14	0	0	0	0	
2012 London	1	4/14	0	0	0	0	
2016 Rio de Janeiro	1	6/14	0	0	0	0	
Total			8	5	12	25	13

==== Rhythmic gymnastics ====
Rhythmic gymnastics has been included in the Olympic programme since 1984.

There are no men's events in the discipline.

Games	Gymnasts	Events	Gold	Silver	Bronze	Total	Ranking
1992 Barcelona	1	1/1	0	0	0	0	
1996 Atlanta	1	1/2	0	0	0	0	
2000 Sydney	1	1/2	0	0	0	0	
2016 Rio de Janeiro	1	1/2	0	0	0	0	
Total			0	0	0	0	–

==== Trampoline ====
Trampoline has been included in the Olympic programme since 2000.

Finland has yet to participate in the discipline.

=== Judo ===
Judo has been included in the Olympic programme since 1964 with the exception of the 1968 Games.

Games	Judoka	Events	Gold	Silver	Bronze	Total	Ranking
1972 Munich	1	1/6	0	0	0	0	
1976 Montreal	1	2/6	0	0	0	0	
1980 Moscow	3	3/8	0	0	0	0	
1984 Los Angeles	3	3/8	0	0	0	0	
1988 Seoul	2	2/7	0	0	0	0	
1992 Barcelona	7	7/14	0	0	0	0	
1996 Atlanta	1	1/14	0	0	0	0	
2000 Sydney	1	1/14	0	0	0	0	
2004 Athens	1	1/14	0	0	0	0	
2008 Beijing	2	2/14	0	0	0	0	
2012 London	3	3/14	0	0	0	0	
2016 Rio de Janeiro	1	1/14	0	0	0	0	
2024 Paris	2	2/15	0	0	0	0	
Total			0	0	0	0	–

=== Modern pentathlon ===
Modern pentathlon has been included in the Olympic programme since 1912.

Games	Pentathletes	Events	Gold	Silver	Bronze	Total	Ranking
1920 Antwerp	2	1/1	0	0	0	0	
1924 Paris	3	1/1	0	0	0	0	
1928 Amsterdam	3	1/1	0	0	0	0	
1936 Berlin	3	1/1	0	0	0	0	
1948 London	3	1/1	0	0	0	0	
1952 Helsinki	3	2/2	0	0	1	1	3
1956 Melbourne	3	2/2	0	1	2	3	3
1960 Rome	3	2/2	0	0	0	0	
1964 Tokyo	3	2/2	0	0	0	0	
1968 Mexico City	3	2/2	0	0	0	0	
1972 Munich	3	2/2	0	0	1	1	3
1976 Montreal	3	2/2	0	0	0	0	
1980 Moscow	3	2/2	0	0	0	0	
1984 Los Angeles	3	2/2	0	0	0	0	
Total			0	1	4	5	16

=== Rowing ===
Rowing has been included in the Olympic programme since 1900.

Games	Rowers	Events	Gold	Silver	Bronze	Total	Ranking
1912 Stockholm	6	2/4	0	0	0	0	
1948 London	5	1/7	0	0	0	0	
1952 Helsinki	26	7/7	0	0	1	1	=11
1956 Melbourne	5	2/7	0	0	1	1	=8
1960 Rome	12	4/7	0	0	1	1	=9
1964 Tokyo	7	2/7	0	0	0	0	
1968 Mexico City	2	1/7	0	0	0	0	
1972 Munich	3	1/7	0	0	0	0	
1976 Montreal	7	3/14	1	0	0	1	5
1980 Moscow	1	1/14	1	0	0	1	4
1984 Los Angeles	3	2/14	1	0	0	1	=6
1988 Seoul	5	3/14	0	0	0	0	
1992 Barcelona	3	2/14	0	0	0	0	
1996 Atlanta	2	2/14	0	0	0	0	
2008 Beijing	2	1/14	0	1	0	1	=14
Total			3	1	3	7	21

=== Sailing ===
Sailing has been included in the Olympic programme since 1900 with the exception of the 1904 Games.

Games	No. Sailors	Events	Gold	Silver	Bronze	Total	Ranking
1912 Stockholm	27	5/4	0	1	2	3	4
1924 Paris	1	1/3	0	0	1	1	5
1928 Amsterdam	1	1/3	0	0	1	1	=6
1936 Berlin / Kiel	12	3/4	0	0	0	0	
1948 London / Torbay	14	4/5	0	0	0	0	
1952 Helsinki	14	5/5	0	0	1	1	=7
1956 Melbourne	3	1/5	0	0	0	0	
1960 Rome / Naples	9	4/5	0	0	0	0	
1964 Tokyo	5	2/5	0	0	0	0	
1968 Mexico City / Acapulco	3	2/5	0	0	0	0	
1972 Munich / Kiel	7	3/6	0	0	0	0	
1976 Montreal / Kingston	8	4/6	0	0	0	0	
1980 Moscow / Tallinn	7	4/6	1	0	1	2	4
1984 Los Angeles	5	3/7	0	0	0	0	
1988 Seoul / Busan	5	3/8	0	0	0	0	
1992 Barcelona	8	5/10	0	0	0	0	
1996 Atlanta / Savannah	8	6/10	0	0	0	0	
2000 Sydney	10	6/11	1	0	0	1	6
2004 Athens	4	3/11	0	0	0	0	
2008 Beijing / Qingdao	9	6/11	0	0	0	0	
2012 London / Weymouth	11	7/10	0	1	1	2	=8
2016 Rio de Janeiro	8	6/10	0	0	0	0	
2020 Tokyo	5	4/10	0	0	0	0	
2024 Paris / Marseille	7	5/10	0	0	0	0	
Total			2	2	7	11	19

=== Shooting ===
Shooting was included in the inaugural 1896 Summer Olympic programme and has been included in all Summer Games except for 1904 and 1928.

Games	Shooters	Events	Gold	Silver	Bronze	Total	Ranking
1908 London	9	2/15	0	0	0	0	
1912 Stockholm	19	7/18	0	0	2	2	10
1920 Antwerp	9	14/21	0	1	2	3	7
1924 Paris	15	10/10	0	1	2	3	7
1936 Berlin	8	3/3	0	0	0	0	
1948 London	12	4/4	0	1	0	1	=5
1952 Helsinki	11	7/7	0	1	1	2	8
1956 Melbourne	4	5/7	1	0	1	2	=2
1960 Rome	8	6/6	0	1	0	1	=6
1964 Tokyo	8	5/6	2	0	0	2	2
1968 Mexico City	9	6/7	0	0	0	0	
1972 Munich	10	7/8	0	0	0	0	
1976 Montreal	4	3/7	0	0	0	0	
1980 Moscow	9	6/7	0	0	0	0	
1984 Los Angeles	10	10/11	0	0	1	1	=16
1988 Seoul	9	9/13	0	0	0	0	
1992 Barcelona	8	10/13	0	0	0	0	
1996 Atlanta	6	7/15	0	0	0	0	
2000 Sydney	7	9/17	0	1	0	1	=17
2004 Athens	6	9/17	0	1	0	1	=13
2008 Beijing	8	10/15	1	0	1	2	7
2012 London	4	6/15	0	0	0	0	
2016 Rio de Janeiro	2	2/15	0	0	0	0	
2020 Tokyo	3	2/15	0	0	0	0	
2024 Paris	3	4/15	0	0	0	0	
Total			4	7	10	21	17

=== Skateboarding ===
Skateboarding has been included in the Olympic programme since 2020.

Games	Skateboarders	Events	Gold	Silver	Bronze	Total	Ranking
2020 Tokyo	1	1/4	0	0	0	0	
2024 Paris	1	1/4	0	0	0	0	
Total			0	0	0	0	–

=== Swimming ===
==== Long course swimming ====
Long course swimming has been included in the Olympic programme since the inaugural 1896 Summer Olympics.

Games	Swimmers	Events	Gold	Silver	Bronze	Total	Ranking
1908 London	3	2/6	0	0	0	0	
1912 Stockholm	6	3/9	0	0	0	0	
1920 Antwerp	1	2/10	0	0	2	2	6
1924 Paris	2	1/11	0	0	0	0	
1928 Amsterdam	1	1/11	0	0	0	0	
1932 Los Angeles	1	1/11	0	0	0	0	
1936 Berlin	2	3/11	0	0	0	0	
1948 London	1	1/11	0	0	0	0	
1952 Helsinki	13	10/11	0	0	0	0	
1956 Melbourne	1	2/13	0	0	0	0	
1960 Rome	5	8/15	0	0	0	0	
1964 Tokyo	6	6/18	0	0	0	0	
1968 Mexico City	3	6/29	0	0	0	0	
1972 Munich	1	3/29	0	0	0	0	
1976 Montreal	1	2/26	0	0	0	0	
1980 Moscow	1	2/26	0	0	0	0	
1984 Los Angeles	2	5/29	0	0	0	0	
1988 Seoul	1	2/31	0	0	0	0	
1992 Barcelona	12	20/31	0	0	1	1	=16
1996 Atlanta	12	22/32	0	1	0	1	=16
2000 Sydney	7	13/32	0	0	0	0	
2004 Athens	7	14/32	0	0	0	0	
2008 Beijing	5	9/32	0	0	0	0	
2012 London	7	14/32	0	0	0	0	
2016 Rio de Janeiro	8	12/32	0	0	0	0	
2020 Tokyo	5	8/35	0	0	1	1	=20
2024 Paris	2	2/35	0	0	0	0	
Total			0	1	4	5	48

==== Marathon swimming ====
Marathon swimming has been included in the Olympic programme since 2008.

Finland has yet to participate in the discipline.

=== Table tennis ===
Table tennis has been included in the Olympic programme since 1988.

Games	Players	Events	Gold	Silver	Bronze	Total	Ranking
2016 Rio de Janeiro	1	1/4	0	0	0	0	
Total			0	0	0	0	–

=== Taekwondo ===
Taekwondo has been included in the Olympic programme since 2000.

Games	Practitioners	Events	Gold	Silver	Bronze	Total	Ranking
2000 Sydney	2	2/8	0	0	0	0	
2004 Athens	1	1/8	0	0	0	0	
2012 London	1	1/8	0	0	0	0	
2016 Rio de Janeiro	1	1/8	0	0	0	0	
Total			0	0	0	0	–

=== Tennis ===
Tennis was originally included in the Olympic programme between 1896 and 1924. Tennis returned to the games in 1988 and has remained in the programme since then.

Games	Players	Events	Gold	Silver	Bronze	Total	Ranking
1924 Paris	4	2/5	0	0	0	0	
2004 Athens	1	1/4	0	0	0	0	
2008 Beijing	1	1/4	0	0	0	0	
2012 London	1	1/5	0	0	0	0	
Total			0	0	0	0	–

=== Weightlifting ===
Weightlifting was first included in the Olympic programme at the inaugural 1896 Summer Olympics. It was excluded from the 1900, 1908 and 1912 Games but have been included every other time.

Games	Weightlifters	Events	Gold	Silver	Bronze	Total	Ranking
1920 Antwerp	1	1/5	0	0	0	0	
1948 London	4	3/6	0	0	0	0	
1952 Helsinki	7	7/7	0	0	0	0	
1956 Melbourne	1	1/7	0	0	0	0	
1960 Rome	2	2/7	0	0	0	0	
1964 Tokyo	4	3/7	0	0	0	0	
1968 Mexico City	5	3/7	1	0	0	1	5
1972 Munich	9	5/9	0	0	0	0	
1976 Montreal	5	5/9	0	0	0	0	
1980 Moscow	7	7/10	0	0	0	0	
1984 Los Angeles	5	5/10	0	0	2	2	9
1988 Seoul	4	3/10	0	0	0	0	
1992 Barcelona	4	3/10	0	0	0	0	
1996 Atlanta	2	2/10	0	0	0	0	
2000 Sydney	1	1/15	0	0	0	0	
2008 Beijing	1	1/15	0	0	0	0	
2012 London	1	1/15	0	0	0	0	
2016 Rio de Janeiro	2	2/15	0	0	0	0	
Total			1	0	2	3	45

=== Wrestling ===
Wrestling was included in the inaugural 1896 Summer Olympic programme and has been included in all Summer Games except for 1900.

Games	Wrestlers	Events	Gold	Silver	Bronze	Total	Ranking
1908 London	4	2/9	1	1	1	3	3
1912 Stockholm	37	5/5	3	2	2	7	1
1920 Antwerp	18	10/10	5	5	2	12	1
1924 Paris	24	13/13	4	7	5	16	1
1928 Amsterdam	13	13/13	3	3	3	9	1
1932 Los Angeles	10	11/14	2	3	3	8	3
1936 Berlin	13	14/14	2	1	3	6	3
1948 London	15	15/16	1	1	1	3	5
1952 Helsinki	16	16/16	1	1	2	4	6
1956 Melbourne	10	14/16	2	0	2	4	5
1960 Rome	14	14/16	0	0	0	0	
1964 Tokyo	10	10/16	0	0	0	0	
1968 Mexico City	9	9/16	0	0	0	0	
1972 Munich	10	10/20	0	0	1	1	=18
1976 Montreal	7	8/20	1	0	0	1	8
1980 Moscow	8	8/20	0	0	1	1	=13
1984 Los Angeles	11	11/20	1	1	1	3	7
1988 Seoul	12	12/20	0	1	1	2	11
1992 Barcelona	7	7/20	0	0	0	0	
1996 Atlanta	5	5/20	0	1	0	1	=15
2000 Sydney	4	4/16	0	0	1	1	=17
2004 Athens	2	2/18	0	1	0	1	=15
2008 Beijing	1	1/18	0	0	0	0	
2012 London	2	2/18	0	0	0	0	
2016 Rio de Janeiro	3	3/18	0	0	0	0	
2020 Tokyo	2	2/18	0	0	0	0	
2024 Paris	2	2/18	0	0	0	0	
Total			26	28	29	83	7

Finnish wrestlers also won 1 gold and 1 silver medal at the 1906 Intercalated Games. IOC has retroactively decided to no longer recognize those games as official Olympic games.

== Summary by winter sports ==
=== Non-participations ===
Finland has participated in all winter sports except Bobsleigh, Luge, Short track speed skating, Skeleton and Ski mountaineering.

=== Alpine skiing ===
Alpine skiing has been included in the Olympic programme since 1936.

Beginning in 1948, Finland has taken part in alpine skiing in 16 previous Olympic games with a medal record of 1 silver in 2006. In 2010, Finland took part in 7 alpine skiing events with a team of 4, their highest placing being 6th (in women's slalom).

Games	Alpine skiers	Events	Gold	Silver	Bronze	Total	Ranking
1948 St. Moritz	2	3/6	0	0	0	0	
1952 Oslo	4	3/6	0	0	0	0	
1956 Cortina d'Ampezzo	2	3/6	0	0	0	0	
1964 Innsbruck	2	3/6	0	0	0	0	
1968 Grenoble	2	3/6	0	0	0	0	
1976 Innsbruck	1	3/6	0	0	0	0	
1988 Calgary	1	2/10	0	0	0	0	
1994 Lillehammer	2	5/10	0	0	0	0	
1998 Nagano	5	5/10	0	0	0	0	
2002 Salt Lake City	4	4/10	0	0	0	0	
2006 Turin	4	4/10	0	1	0	1	8
2010 Vancouver	4	7/10	0	0	0	0	
2014 Sochi	4	4/10	0	0	0	0	
2018 Pyeongchang	2	4/11	0	0	0	0	
2022 Beijing	4	3/11	0	0	0	0	
2026 Milano Cortina	6	8/10	0	0	0	0	
Total			0	1	0	1	=21

=== Biathlon ===
An event in military patrol, a precursor sport to biathlon, was held at the 1924 Winter Olympics. Biathlon arrived as its own sport at the 1960 Winter Olympics.

Since biathlon was introduced in the Olympics in 1960, Finland has taken part in the sport in all previous 18 games, with a medal record of 4 silvers and 3 bronzes, latest won in 2026, plus 1 silver from military patrol. In 2010, Finland took part in 6 biathlon events with a team of 4, their highest placing being 41st (in men's sprint).

Games	Biathletes	Events	Gold	Silver	Bronze	Total	Ranking
1960 Squaw Valley	4	1/1	0	1	0	1	2
1964 Innsbruck	4	1/1	0	0	0	0	
1968 Grenoble	6	2/2	0	0	0	0	
1972 Sapporo	5	2/2	0	1	0	1	4
1976 Innsbruck	4	2/2	0	2	0	2	2
1980 Lake Placid	6	3/3	0	0	0	0	
1984 Sarajevo	5	3/3	0	0	0	0	
1988 Calgary	5	3/3	0	0	0	0	
1992 Albertville	9	6/6	0	0	1	1	=5
1994 Lillehammer	9	6/6	0	0	0	0	
1998 Nagano	7	5/6	0	0	1	1	=7
2002 Salt Lake City	9	8/8	0	0	0	0	
2006 Turin	1	4/10	0	0	0	0	
2010 Vancouver	4	6/10	0	0	0	0	
2014 Sochi	4	6/11	0	0	0	0	
2018 Pyeongchang	8	10/11	0	0	0	0	
2022 Beijing	8	10/11	0	0	0	0	
2026 Milano Cortina	10	11/11	0	0	1	1	=5
Total			0	4	3	7	18

=== Cross-country skiing ===
Cross-country skiing has been was included in the Olympic programme since the inaugural 1924 Winter Olympics.

Finland has taken part in cross-country skiing in all previous Winter Olympic Games with a medal record of 22 golds, 27 silvers and 38 bronzes. In 2010, Finland took part in all 12 cross country skiing events with team of 17, winning bronze in women's 30 kilometre classical and 4 × 5 kilometre relay.

Games	Skiers	Events	Gold	Silver	Bronze	Total	Ranking
1924 Chamonix	5	2/2	0	0	1	1	2
1928 St. Moritz	7	2/2	0	0	0	0	
1932 Lake Placid	5	2/2	1	1	1	3	1
1936 Garmisch-Partenkirchen	7	3/3	1	0	1	2	2
1948 St. Moritz	13	3/3	0	1	1	2	2
1952 Oslo	17	4/4	3	3	2	8	1
1956 Cortina d'Ampezzo	15	6/6	2	2	0	4	2
1960 Squaw Valley	12	6/6	2	1	2	5	2
1964 Innsbruck	11	7/7	2	2	2	6	2
1968 Grenoble	11	7/7	0	1	2	3	5
1972 Sapporo	14	7/7	0	2	1	3	4
1976 Innsbruck	12	7/7	2	2	1	5	2
1980 Lake Placid	12	7/7	0	4	2	6	4
1984 Sarajevo	10	8/8	3	1	4	8	1
1988 Calgary	17	8/8	1	0	2	3	3
1992 Albertville	14	10/10	1	1	1	3	4
1994 Lillehammer	13	10/10	0	1	4	5	5
1998 Nagano	11	10/10	1	0	2	3	3
2002 Salt Lake City	14	12/12	0	0	0	0	
2006 Turin	13	12/12	0	0	1	1	=10
2010 Vancouver	17	12/12	0	0	2	2	=9
2014 Sochi	16	12/12	1	2	0	3	5
2018 Pyeongchang	15	12/12	1	1	2	4	3
2022 Beijing	13	12/12	1	2	3	6	3
2026 Milano Cortina	16	12/12	0	0	1	0	=7
Total			22	27	38	87	4

=== Curling ===
Curling was included in the Olympic programme during the inaugural 1924 Winter Olympics. It didn't return until 1998, but has remained in the Games since then.

Finland has participated Olympic curling three times, first in 2002, then in 2006, when they won silver. Their most recent participation was in 2018.

Games	Curlers	Events	Gold	Silver	Bronze	Total	Ranking
2002 Salt Lake City	5	1/2	0	0	0	0	
2006 Turin	4	1/2	0	1	0	1	=3
2018 Pyeongchang	2	1/3	0	0	0	0	
Total			0	1	0	1	=9

=== Figure skating ===
Figure skating was first included in the Olympic programme in the 1908 and 1920 Summer Olympics. It was moved to the Winter Olympics with the inaugural 1924 Winter Olympics and has been included in every Winter Olympic Games.

Beginning in the 1920 Summer Olympics, Finland has taken part in figure skating in 18 Olympic games with a medal record of 1 gold and 1 silver, latest won in 1924. In 2010, Finland took part in 2 figure skating events with a team of 3, their highest placing being 6th (in ladies' singles).

Games	Figure skaters	Events	Gold	Silver	Bronze	Total	Ranking
1920 Antwerp	3	2/3	1	0	0	1	2
1924 Chamonix	2	1/3	0	1	0	1	=3
1928 St. Moritz	3	2/3	0	0	0	0	
1932 Lake Placid	1	1/3	0	0	0	0	
1936 Garmisch-Partenkirchen	1	1/3	0	0	0	0	
1952 Oslo	2	2/3	0	0	0	0	
1956 Cortina d'Ampezzo	1	1/3	0	0	0	0	
1976 Innsbruck	1	1/4	0	0	0	0	
1980 Lake Placid	2	1/4	0	0	0	0	
1992 Albertville	3	2/4	0	0	0	0	
1994 Lillehammer	3	2/4	0	0	0	0	
1998 Nagano	1	1/4	0	0	0	0	
2002 Salt Lake City	1	1/4	0	0	0	0	
2006 Turin	2	1/4	0	0	0	0	
2010 Vancouver	3	2/4	0	0	0	0	
2018 Pyeongchang	1	1/5	0	0	0	0	
2022 Beijing	3	2/5	0	0	0	0	
2026 Milano Cortina	3	2/5	0	0	0	0	
Total			1	1	0	2	=18

=== Freestyle skiing ===
Freestyle skiing has been included in the Olympic programme since 1992. Finland has taken part in it in all previous games, with a medal record of 1 gold, 2 silvers and 1 bronze, latest medal won in 2006. In 2010, Finland took part in 2 freestyle skiing events with a team of 4, their highest placing being 14th (in men's moguls).

Games	Skiers	Events	Gold	Silver	Bronze	Total	Ranking
1992 Albertville	4	2/2	0	0	0	0	
1994 Lillehammer	3	2/4	0	0	0	0	
1998 Nagano	4	2/4	0	1	1	2	3
2002 Salt Lake City	5	2/4	1	0	0	1	=1
2006 Turin	4	1/4	0	1	0	1	=5
2010 Vancouver	4	2/6	0	0	0	0	
2014 Sochi	10	4/10	0	0	0	0	
2018 Pyeongchang	3	2/10	0	0	0	0	
2022 Beijing	6	6/13	0	0	0	0	
2026 Milano Cortina	8	6/15	0	0	0	0	
Total			1	2	1	4	10

=== Ice hockey ===
Ice hockey was first included in the Olympic programme in the 1920 Summer Olympics. It was moved to the Winter Olympics with the inaugural 1924 Winter Olympics and has been included in every Winter Olympic Games.

Beginning in 1952, Finland has taken part in ice hockey in 19 previous Olympic games, with a medal record of 1 gold, 2 silvers and 9 bronzes.

Games	Players	Events	Gold	Silver	Bronze	Total	Ranking
1952 Oslo	17	1/1	0	0	0	0	
1960 Squaw Valley	17	1/1	0	0	0	0	
1964 Innsbruck	16	1/1	0	0	0	0	
1968 Grenoble	17	1/1	0	0	0	0	
1972 Sapporo	19	1/1	0	0	0	0	
1976 Innsbruck	18	1/1	0	0	0	0	
1980 Lake Placid	20	1/1	0	0	0	0	
1984 Sarajevo	20	1/1	0	0	0	0	
1988 Calgary	22	1/1	0	1	0	1	2
1992 Albertville	22	1/1	0	0	0	0	
1994 Lillehammer	22	1/1	0	0	1	1	3
1998 Nagano	42	2/2	0	0	2	2	5
2002 Salt Lake City	41	2/2	0	0	0	0	
2006 Turin	43	2/2	0	1	0	1	3
2010 Vancouver	41	2/2	0	0	2	2	3
2014 Sochi	43	2/2	0	0	1	1	=4
2018 Pyeongchang	44	2/2	0	0	1	1	5
2022 Beijing	46	2/2	1	0	1	2	1
2026 Milano Cortina	48	2/2	0	0	1	1	=3
Total			1	2	9	12	5

=== Military patrol ===
Military patrol was included at the 1924 Olympics. It was included as a demonstration sport at the 1928, 1936 and 1948 Winter Olympics. Since 1960 it has been replaced by its successor sport biathlon.

Finland did participate and won the silver medal.

Games	Biathletes	Events	Gold	Silver	Bronze	Total	Ranking
1924 Chamonix	4	1/1	0	1	0	1	2
Total			0	1	0	1	2

=== Nordic combined ===
Nordic combined has been included in the Olympic programme since the inaugural 1924 Winter Games. There are no women's events in the sport.

Beginning in the first Winter Olympic games, Finland has taken part in Nordic combined in 24 previous games, with a medal record of 4 golds, 9 silvers and 4 bronzes, latest medals won in 2026. In 2010, Finland took part in all 3 Nordic combined events with a team of 4, their highest placing being 4th (in individual large hill/10 km).

Games	Skiers	Events	Gold	Silver	Bronze	Total	Ranking
1924 Chamonix	2	1/1	0	0	0	0	
1928 St. Moritz	2	1/1	0	0	0	0	
1936 Garmisch-Partenkirchen	4	1/1	0	0	0	0	
1948 St. Moritz	4	1/1	1	1	0	2	1
1952 Oslo	4	1/1	0	1	0	1	2
1956 Cortina d'Ampezzo	3	1/1	0	0	0	0	
1960 Squaw Valley	4	1/1	0	0	0	0	
1964 Innsbruck	4	1/1	0	0	0	0	
1968 Grenoble	3	1/1	0	0	0	0	
1972 Sapporo	3	1/1	0	1	0	1	2
1976 Innsbruck	4	1/1	0	0	0	0	
1980 Lake Placid	4	1/1	0	1	0	1	2
1984 Sarajevo	3	1/1	0	1	1	2	2
1988 Calgary	4	2/2	0	0	0	0	
1992 Albertville	4	2/2	0	0	0	0	
1994 Lillehammer	4	2/2	0	0	0	0	
1998 Nagano	4	2/2	0	2	0	2	2
2002 Salt Lake City	5	3/3	3	1	0	4	1
2006 Turin	5	3/3	0	0	1	1	4
2010 Vancouver	4	3/3	0	0	0	0	
2014 Sochi	4	2/3	0	0	0	0	
2018 Pyeongchang	5	3/3	0	0	0	0	
2022 Beijing	5	3/3	0	0	0	0	
2026 Milano Cortina	3	3/3	0	1	2	3	3
Total			4	9	4	17	3

=== Ski jumping ===
Ski jumping has been included in the Olympic programme since the inaugural 1924 Winter Games.

Beginning at the first Winter Olympics, Finland has taken part in ski jumping in 24 previous games, with a medal record of 10 golds, 8 silvers and 4 bronzes, making Finland the most successful ski jumping country up to 2010, latest medals won in 2006. In 2010, Finland took part in all 3 ski jumping events with a team of 5, their highest placing being 4th (in normal hill individual and large hill team).

Games	Ski jumpers	Events	Gold	Silver	Bronze	Total	Ranking
1924 Chamonix	2	1/1	0	0	0	0	
1928 St. Moritz	2	1/1	0	0	0	0	
1936 Garmisch-Partenkirchen	4	1/1	0	0	0	0	
1948 St. Moritz	4	1/1	0	0	0	0	
1952 Oslo	4	1/1	0	0	0	0	
1956 Cortina d'Ampezzo	4	1/1	1	1	0	2	1
1960 Squaw Valley	4	1/1	0	1	0	1	2
1964 Innsbruck	4	2/2	1	1	0	2	2
1968 Grenoble	5	2/2	0	0	0	0	
1972 Sapporo	4	2/2	0	0	0	0	
1976 Innsbruck	4	2/2	0	0	0	0	
1980 Lake Placid	4	2/2	1	0	1	2	2
1984 Sarajevo	4	2/2	1	1	1	3	1
1988 Calgary	6	3/3	3	0	0	3	1
1992 Albertville	4	3/3	2	0	1	3	1
1994 Lillehammer	5	3/3	0	0	0	0	
1998 Nagano	4	3/3	1	1	0	2	2
2002 Salt Lake City	5	3/3	0	1	1	2	=3
2006 Turin	5	3/3	0	2	0	2	3
2010 Vancouver	5	3/3	0	0	0	0	
2014 Sochi	5	4/4	0	0	0	0	
2018 Pyeongchang	6	4/4	0	0	0	0	
2022 Beijing	3	3/5	0	0	0	0	
2026 Milano Cortina	7	6/6	0	0	0	0	
Total			10	8	4	22	2

=== Snowboarding ===
Snowboarding has been included in the Olympic programme since 1998.

Finland has participated in the sport in all previous games, with a medal record of 2 silvers and 2 bronzes. In 2010, Finland took part in 2 snowboarding events with a team of 5, winning silver in men's halfpipe.

Games	Snowboarders	Events	Gold	Silver	Bronze	Total	Ranking
1998 Nagano	6	2/4	0	0	0	0	
2002 Salt Lake City	7	2/4	0	0	0	0	
2006 Turin	5	2/6	0	0	1	1	=5
2010 Vancouver	5	2/6	0	1	0	1	=7
2014 Sochi	11	5/10	0	1	0	1	=11
2018 Pyeongchang	8	6/10	0	0	1	1	=13
2022 Beijing	4	4/11	0	0	0	0	
2026 Milano Cortina	2	4/11	0	0	0	0	
Total			0	2	2	4	19

=== Speed skating ===
Speed skating has been included in the Olympic programme since the inaugural 1924 Winter Olympics.

Beginning in the first Olympic Winter Games in 1924, Finland has taken part in speed skating in 22 previous Olympics, with a medal record of 7 golds, 8 silvers and 9 bronzes, latest medals won in 1968. In 2010, Finland took part in 2 speed skating events with a team of 4, their highest placing being 5th (in men's 500 metres).

Games	Skaters	Events	Gold	Silver	Bronze	Total	Ranking
1924 Chamonix	3	5/5	4	2	2	8	1
1928 St. Moritz	6	4/4	2	1	1	4	2
1932 Lake Placid	1	3/4	0	0	0	0	
1936 Garmisch-Partenkirchen	5	4/4	0	2	2	4	2
1948 St. Moritz	5	4/4	0	1	1	2	4
1952 Oslo	6	4/4	0	0	0	0	
1956 Cortina d'Ampezzo	6	4/4	0	0	1	1	4
1960 Squaw Valley	7	8/8	0	0	1	1	=6
1964 Innsbruck	10	8/8	0	1	1	2	5
1968 Grenoble	8	8/8	1	1	0	2	=3
1972 Sapporo	6	8/8	0	0	0	0	
1976 Innsbruck	4	9/9	0	0	0	0	
1980 Lake Placid	4	9/9	0	0	0	0	
1984 Sarajevo	3	5/9	0	0	0	0	
1988 Calgary	2	3/10	0	0	0	0	
1992 Albertville	2	4/10	0	0	0	0	
1998 Nagano	1	2/10	0	0	0	0	
2002 Salt Lake City	3	3/10	0	0	0	0	
2006 Turin	4	3/12	0	0	0	0	
2010 Vancouver	4	2/12	0	0	0	0	
2014 Sochi	3	2/12	0	0	0	0	
2018 Pyeongchang	3	3/14	0	0	0	0	
Total			7	8	9	24	10

== Medals in art competitions ==
Art competitions held at Summer Olympics between 1912 and 1948, and at the 1906 Intercalated Games.

Finland won 3 gold, 1 silver and 1 bronze medal in art competitions.

== See also ==
- Category:Olympic competitors for Finland
- List of flag bearers for Finland at the Olympics
- Finland at the Paralympics
- Finland at the European Games
- European Youth Olympic Festival
- European Para Youth Games
- Sport in Finland
