= Thorstein Johansen =

Norwegian rifle shooter (1888–1963)

Personal information
- Born: 7 January 1888 Oslo, Norway
- Died: 2 August 1963 (aged 75) Oslo, Norway

Sport
- Sport: Sports shooting
Medal record
Men's shooting
Representing Norway
Olympic Games
Gold medal – first place	1920 Antwerp	team 100 m running deer, double shots

Thorstein Arthur Johansen (7 January 1888 – 2 August 1963) was a Norwegian rifle shooter who competed in the early 20th century.

He participated in shooting at the 1920 Summer Olympics in Antwerp and won the gold medal in team 100 m running deer, double shots. He was also a member of the Norwegian trap team, which finished seventh in the team clay pigeons event.
