= Bengt Lagercrantz =

Swedish sport shooter

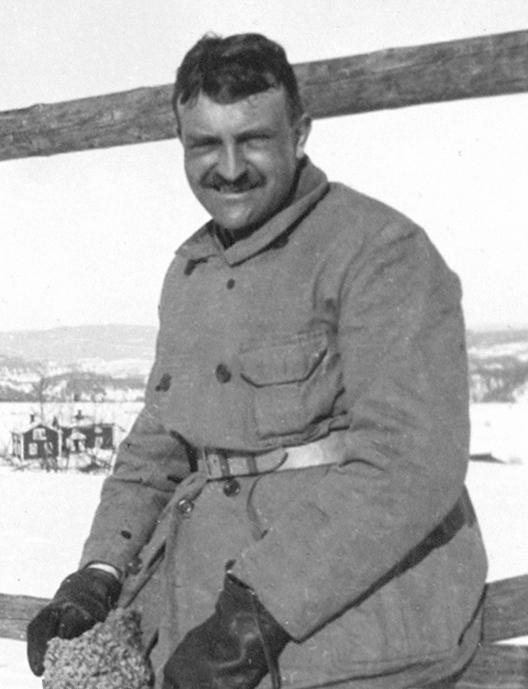

Personal information
- Born: 12 March 1887 Djursholm, Sweden
- Died: 22 July 1924 (aged 37) Djursholm, Sweden

Sport
- Sport: Sports shooting
- Club: FOK, Stockholm
Medal record
Representing Sweden
Olympic Games
Silver medal – second place	1920 Antwerp	Team running deer, double shots

Carl Fredrik Bengt Lagercrantz (12 March 1887 – 22 July 1924) was a Swedish sport shooter who competed in the 1920 Summer Olympics. He won a silver medal in the team running deer, double shots competition. He also placed fourth in the team running deer, single shots event.
