= Karl Larsson (sport shooter) =

Swedish sport shooter

Personal information
- Born: 8 July 1865 Borås, Sweden
- Died: 24 January 1943 (aged 77) Stockholm, Sweden

Sport
- Sport: Sport shooting

Karl Larsson (8 July 1865 – 24 January 1943) was a Swedish sport shooter who competed in the 1912 Summer Olympics and in the 1920 Summer Olympics.

He was born in Borås. In 1912 he finished fourth in the 100 metre running deer, single shots event. Eight years later, he was a member of the Swedish team, which finished fourth in the team 100 metre running deer, single shots competition.
