= Military patrol at the Winter Olympics =

- Governing body: IBU
- Events: 1 (men)

Winter Olympics
- 1924; 1928; 1932; 1936; 1948; 1952; 1956; 1960; 1964; 1968; 1972; 1976; 1980; 1984; 1988; 1992; 1994; 1998; 2002; 2006; 2010; 2014; 2018; 2022; 2026; Note: demonstration or exhibition sport years indicated in italics
- Medalists

Military patrol was featured in the Winter Olympic Games programme four times: 1924, 1928, 1936, and 1948. Medals were awarded for military patrol in 1924, but it was a demonstration event for the other three Winter Games.

Military patrol is considered to be the precursor to the sport of biathlon, however the 1924 Official Report lists it as an event within the sport of skiing. The official website of the IOC treats military patrol at the 1924 Games as a standalone discipline, without specifying if it is considered part of either sport. Currently, neither the International Ski and Snowboard Federation (governing body for skiing) nor the International Biathlon Union (governing body for biathlon) govern military patrol events.

== Medal table ==
Rank	Nation	Gold	Silver	Bronze	Total
1	Switzerland	1	0	0	1
2	Finland	0	1	0	1
3	France	0	0	1	1
Totals (3 entries)		1	1	1	3

== See also ==
- Military patrol
- Biathlon at the Winter Olympics
