= Shooting at the 1920 Summer Olympics – Men's 100 meter team running deer, single shots =

Men's 100 meter team running deer, single shots at the Games of the VII Olympiad
- Venue: Hoogboom Military Camp
- Date: 27 July 1920
- Competitors: 20 from 4 nations

Medalists
1st place, gold medalist(s)		Einar Liberg, Ole Lilloe-Olsen, Harald Natvig, Hans Nordvik, Otto Olsen; Norway
2nd place, silver medalist(s)		Yrjö Kolho, Kalle Lappalainen, Toivo Tikkanen, Nestori Toivonen, Magnus Wegelius; Finland
3rd place, bronze medalist(s)		Thomas Brown, Willis A. Lee, Lawrence Nuesslein, Carl Osburn, Lloyd Spooner; United States

The men's 100 meter team running deer, single shots was a shooting sports event which was held as part of the Shooting at the 1920 Summer Olympics programme, held in the third appearance of the event. The competition was held on 27 July 1920, in which 20 shooters from four nations competed.

== Results ==
The scores of the five shooters were summed to give a team score.

Place	Shooter	Score
1
1	Norway	178
1	Harald Natvig	40
1	Otto Olsen	39
1	Ole Lilloe-Olsen	36
1	Einar Liberg	36
1	Hans Nordvik	27
2
2	Finland	159
2	Nestori Toivonen	36
2	Yrjö Kolho	34
2	Magnus Wegelius	33
2	Toivo Tikkanen	30
2	Kalle Lappalainen	26
3
3	United States	158
3	Thomas Brown	36
3	Lawrence Nuesslein	36
3	Lloyd Spooner	34
3	Carl Osburn	28
3	Willis A. Lee	24
4
4	Sweden	153
4	Alfred Swahn	34
4	Per Kinde	32
4	Bengt Lagercrantz	32
4	Oscar Swahn	28
4	Karl Larsson	27
