= Shooting at the 1920 Summer Olympics – Men's 100 metre team running deer, double shots =

Men's 100 meter team running deer, double shots at the Games of the VII Olympiad
- Venue: Hoogboom Military Camp
- Date: 27 July 1920
- Competitors: 20 from 4 nations

Medalists
1st place, gold medalist(s)		Thorstein Johansen, Einar Liberg, Ole Lilloe-Olsen, Harald Natvig, Hans Nordvik; Norway
2nd place, silver medalist(s)		Edward Benedicks, Bengt Lagercrantz, Fredric Landelius, Alfred Swahn, Oscar Swahn; Sweden
3rd place, bronze medalist(s)		Yrjö Kolho, Toivo Tikkanen, Nestori Toivonen, Vilho Vauhkonen, Magnus Wegelius; Finland

The men's 100 meter team running deer, double shots was a shooting sports event held as part of the shooting at the 1920 Summer Olympics programme. It was the first appearance for the event. In 1908 and 1912 running deer team event were only held for single shots. The competition was held on 27 July 1920. 20 shooters from four nations competed.

Swedish team member Oscar Swahn was 72 years 280 days old when he won silver in this event, setting a never-beaten record for the oldest Olympic medallist.

== Results ==
The scores of the five shooters were summed to give a team score.

Place	Shooter	Score
1
1	Norway	343
1	Ole Lilloe-Olsen	77
1	Thorstein Johansen	74
1	Harald Natvig	68
1	Einar Liberg	62
1	Hans Nordvik	62
2
2	Sweden	336
2	Fredric Landelius	70
2	Alfred Swahn	69
2	Oscar Swahn	68
2	Bengt Lagercrantz	65
2	Edward Benedicks	64
3
3	Finland	285
3	Toivo Tikkanen	69
3	Magnus Wegelius	64
3	Nestori Toivonen	57
3	Yrjö Kolho	54
3	Vilho Vauhkonen	41
4
4	United States	282
4	Lloyd Spooner	66
4	Willis A. Lee	58
4	Lawrence Nuesslein	56
4	Carl Osburn	52
4	Thomas Brown	50
