= Magnus Wegelius =

Finnish gymnast and sport shooter

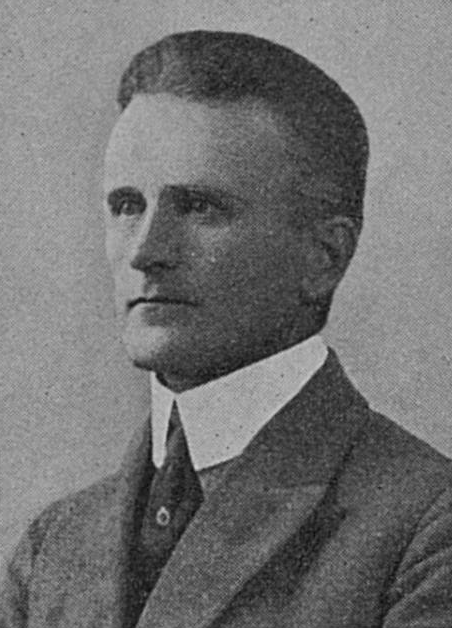

Personal information
- Full name: Kurt Magnus Wegelius
- National team: Finland
- Born: 20 August 1884 Hattula, Grand Duchy of Finland, Russian Empire
- Died: 9 December 1936 (aged 52) Croydon, United Kingdom
- Education: Master of Science (Technology), Helsinki University of Technology, 1909
- Occupations: Engineer, plant manager
- Spouses: Ester Tavaststjerna (m. 1915); Elsbeth Anna Martinson (m. 1929)

Sport
- Sport: Sport shooting, gymnastics, track and field athletics
- Club: Suomen Metsästysyhdistys; Porin Tarmo; Helsingin Kisa-Veikot

Gymnastics career
- Discipline: Men's artistic gymnastics
- Country represented: Finland
Medal record
Representing Finland (Russia)
Olympic Games
Gymnastics
Bronze medal – third place	1908 London	Gymnastics team
Shooting
Silver medal – second place	1920 Antwerp	100 meter team running deer, single shots
Bronze medal – third place	1920 Antwerp	300 metre team military rifle, prone
Bronze medal – third place	1920 Antwerp	100 metre team running deer, double shots
Bronze medal – third place	1924 Paris	Team clay pigeons
ISSF World Shooting Championships
Bronze medal – third place	1929 Stockholm	100 metre running deer single shots, team
Bronze medal – third place	1929 Stockholm	100 metre running deer double shots, team

Karl Magnus Wegelius (20 August 1884 – 9 December 1936) was a Finnish multi-sport athlete who won five Olympic medals and eight Finnish national championships in sport shooting, gymnastics, and track and field athletics.

== Sport ==
=== Olympics ===
Magnus Wegelius at the Olympic Games
Games	Sport	Event	Rank	Notes
1908 Summer Olympics	Gymnastics	Men's team	3rd	Source:
1920 Summer Olympics	Shooting	300 metre free rifle, three positions	37th–	Exact rank unknown
1920 Summer Olympics	Shooting	Team free rifle	4th	
1920 Summer Olympics	Shooting	300 metre team military rifle, prone	3rd	
1920 Summer Olympics	Shooting	300 metre military rifle, standing	11th–	Exact rank unknown
1920 Summer Olympics	Shooting	300 metre team military rifle, standing	7th	
1920 Summer Olympics	Shooting	600 metre military rifle, prone	11th	
1920 Summer Olympics	Shooting	600 metre team military rifle, prone	8th	
1920 Summer Olympics	Shooting	300 and 600 metre team military rifle, prone	10th	
1920 Summer Olympics	Shooting	100 meter team running deer, single shots	2nd	
1920 Summer Olympics	Shooting	100 metre team running deer, double shots	3rd	
1924 Summer Olympics	Shooting	100 meter running deer, single shots	12th	
1924 Summer Olympics	Shooting	100 meter team running deer, single shots	5th	
1924 Summer Olympics	Shooting	100 meter running deer, double shots	7th	
1924 Summer Olympics	Shooting	100 meter team running deer, double shots	4th	
1924 Summer Olympics	Shooting	Team clay pigeons	3rd	

=== International ===
He won two bronze medals at the ISSF World Shooting Championships in 1929:

- 100 metre running deer single shots, men team
- 100 metre running deer double shots, men team

=== National ===
In shooting, he won six Finnish championships in single-shot moose in 1914, 1921, 1922, 1926, 1927 and 1928.

In track and field athletics, he won two Finnish national championship golds 4 × 100 metres relay and 1600 metre medley relay, both in 1910, representing the club Porin Tarmo.

He was a treasurer and a vice president of Finnish Shooting Sport Federation.

== Career ==
He performed his matriculation exam in Tampere Real Lycaeum in 1905 and graduated as a diplomi-insinööri from the Helsinki University of Technology in 1909.

Beginning in 1910, he worked as an engineer. He became the manager of the SOK production plants in 1918.

He was a board member of the Association of National Work.

He was a Knight (Chevalier) of the White Rose of Finland.

== Family ==
His parents were farmer Uno Wegelius and Helena Charlotta Wirzenius. He married Ester Tavaststjerna in 1915 and Elsbeth Anna Martinson in 1929. He had a daughter.

== Death ==
He died in the 1936 KLM Croydon accident while on a business trip to England.
