= Yrjö Kolho =

Finnish sport shooter

Personal information
- Born: 23 April 1888 Keuruu, Finland
- Died: 13 February 1969 (aged 80) Vilppula, Finland

Sport
- Sport: Sports shooting
Medal record
Men's shooting
Representing Finland
Olympic Games
Silver medal – second place	1920 Antwerp	team running deer, single shots
Bronze medal – third place	1920 Antwerp	team running deer, double shots

Yrjö Eliel Kolho (née Saxberg, 23 April 1888 – 13 February 1969) was a Finnish sport shooter who competed in the 1920 Summer Olympics. He was born in Keuruu and died in Vilppula. He changed his name in 1905.

In 1920, he won the silver medal as a member of the Finnish team in the team running deer, single shots event, and the bronze medal in the team running deer, double shots competition. In the 1920 Summer Olympics, he also participated in the following events:

- 100 metre running deer, single shots – fourth place
- Team 50 metre free pistol – eleventh place
