= Robert Tikkanen =

Finnish sport shooter

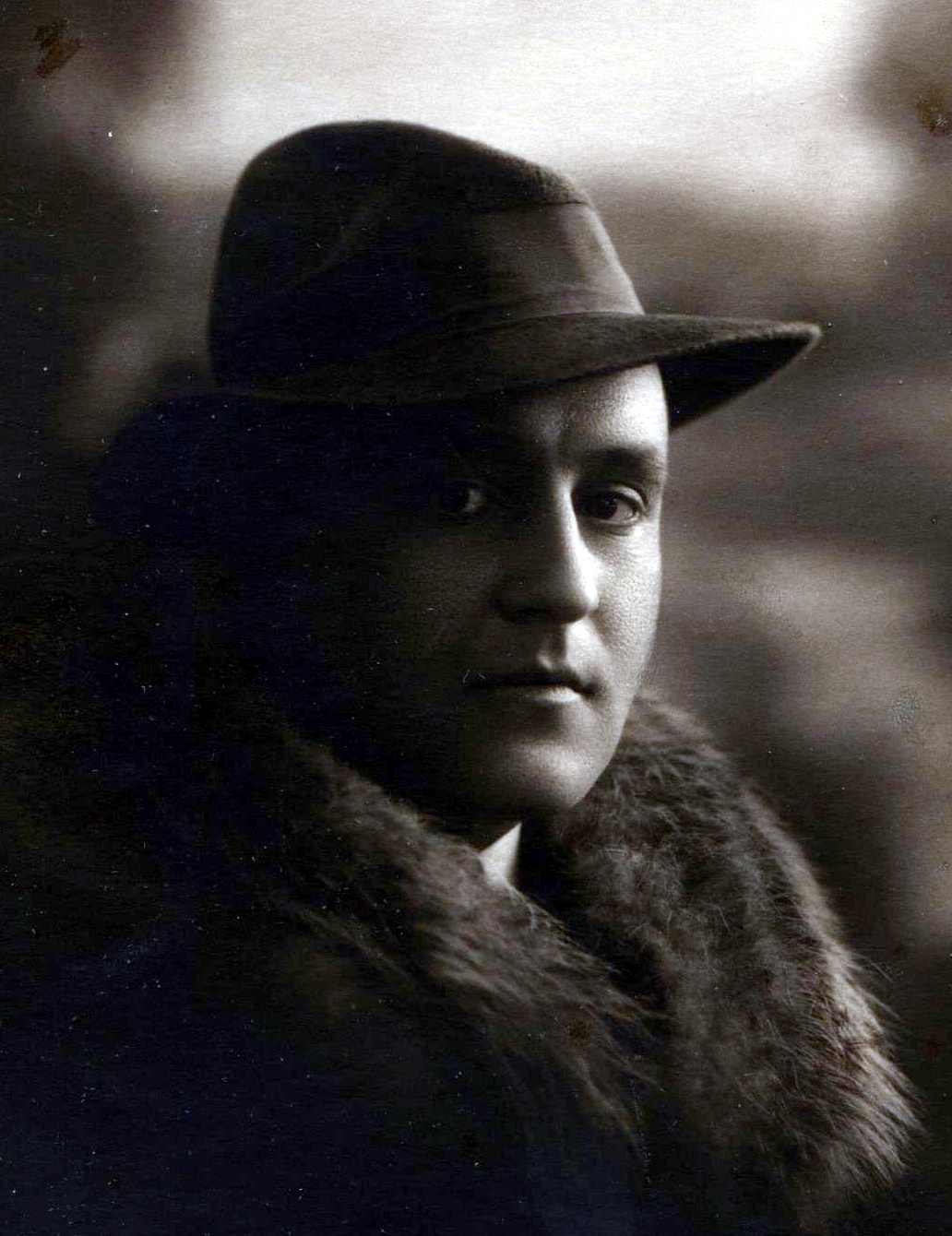
- Toivo Tikkanen before 1920.

Personal information
- Born: 15 April 1888 Rome, Italy
- Died: 1 June 1947 (aged 59) Helsinki, Finland

Sport
- Sport: Sports shooting
Medal record
Men's shooting
Representing Finland
Olympic Games
| Silver medal – second place | 1920 Antwerp | team running deer, single shots |
| Bronze medal – third place | 1920 Antwerp | team running deer, double shots |
| Bronze medal – third place | 1924 Paris | team clay pigeons |

Toivo Robert Tikkanen (15 April 1888 – 1 June 1947) was a Finnish sport shooter who competed in the 1920 Summer Olympics and in the 1924 Summer Olympics. He was born in Rome, Italy and died in Helsinki. 1908-1911, Tikkanen played ice hockey for the Akademischer Sport Club Dresden team in Germany.

1920 Antwerp

In 1920, he won the silver medal as member of the Finnish team in the team running deer, single shots event and the bronze medal in the team running deer, double shots competition.

In the 1920 Summer Olympics, he also participated in the following events:

- 100 metre running deer, single shots - fifth place
- Team 50 metre free pistol - eleventh place

1924 Paris

Four years later, he won the bronze medal with the Finnish team in the team clay pigeons competition.

He also participated in the following events:

- Team 100 metre running deer, double shots - fourth place
- Team 100 metre running deer, single shots - fifth place
- 100 metre running deer, double shots - sixth place
- 100 metre running deer, single shots - 15th place
- individual trap - result unknown
