= Hans Nordvik =

Norwegian sport shooter (1880–1960)

Personal information
- Born: 1 August 1880 Trondenes, Norway
- Died: 22 July 1960 (aged 79) Oslo, Norway

Sport
- Sport: Sport shooting
Medal record
Men's shooting
Representing Norway
Olympic Games
Gold medal – first place	1920 Antwerp	team 100 m running deer, single shots
Gold medal – first place	1920 Antwerp	team 100 m running deer, double shots

Hans Nordvik (1 August 1880 – 22 July 1960) was a Norwegian rifle shooter who competed in the early 20th century in rifle shooting. He participated in shooting at the 1920 Summer Olympics in Antwerp and won the gold medals both in team 100 m running deer, single shots and team 100 m running deer, double shots.
