= Modern pentathlon at the 1956 Summer Olympics – Men's team =

Men's team modern pentathlon at the Games of the XVI Olympiad
- Venue: Oaklands Hunt Club; Swimming/Diving Stadium; Williamstown
- Dates: November 23–28
- Competitors: 36 from 12 nations

Medalists
1st place, gold medalist(s)		Igor Novikov; Ivan Deryugin; Aleksandr Tarasov	Soviet Union
2nd place, silver medalist(s)		William Andre; Jack Daniels; George Lambert	United States
3rd place, bronze medalist(s)		Olavi Mannonen; Väinö Korhonen; Berndt Katter	Finland

The men's team modern pentathlon was an event contested at the 1956 Summer Olympics in Melbourne. It was the second appearance of the team modern pentathlon event. The team event used scores from the individual event except that fencing scores were recomputed to account for only team event competitors.

== Competition format ==
The modern pentathlon consisted of five events. The competition dropped the point-for-place system used in previous Games. The 1956 competition introduced a scoring system in which each the results of each event was converted to a score, with a par value of 1,000 in each event, and higher scores were desirable. For the team competition, the scores of the three individual team members were summed.

- Riding: a show jumping competition. The course was 5000 m long, with a time limit of 10 minutes. Riders started with 1000 points; gaining or losing 2.5 points for every second under or over the time limit. They could also lose points through obstacle faults. Negative scores were not possible; the lowest score was 0.
- Fencing: a round-robin, one-touch épée competition. The par score of 1000 points was awarded for winning 75% of the fencer's matches. Each victory above or below that number adjusted the score.
- Shooting: a rapid fire pistol competition, with 20 shots (each scoring up to 10 points) per competitor. A target score of 195 would give 1000 points; every target point above or below that resulted in a 20-point adjustment.
- Swimming: a 300 m freestyle swimming competition. The par time was 4 minutes, with every second above or below adjusting the score by 5 points.
- Running: a 4 km race. The par time was 15 minutes, with every second above or below adjusting the score by 3 points.

== Results ==
Rank	Nation	Athletes	Riding	Fencing	Shooting	Swimming	Running	Total
1st place, gold medalist(s)	Soviet Union	Igor Novikov	802.5	752	920	985	1192	4651.5
1st place, gold medalist(s)	Soviet Union	Aleksandr Tarasov	810.0	876	880	825	1186	4577.0
1st place, gold medalist(s)	Soviet Union	Ivan Deriuhin	845.0	566	780	1070	1201	4462.0
1st place, gold medalist(s)	Soviet Union	Total	2457.5	2194	2580	2880	3579	13,690.5
2nd place, silver medalist(s)	United States	George Lambert	1070.0	814	900	975	1081	4840.0
2nd place, silver medalist(s)	United States	William Andre	887.5	752	860	870	1123	4492.5
2nd place, silver medalist(s)	United States	Jack Daniels	1062.5	442	800	935	910	4149.5
2nd place, silver medalist(s)	United States	Total	3020.0	2008	2560	2780	3114	13,482.0
3rd place, bronze medalist(s)	Finland	Ole Mannonen	997.5	752	880	920	1162	4711.5
3rd place, bronze medalist(s)	Finland	Wäinö Korhonen	885.0	814	880	905	1117	4601.0
3rd place, bronze medalist(s)	Finland	Berndt Katter	630.0	442	760	930	1111	3873.0
3rd place, bronze medalist(s)	Finland	Total	2512.5	2008	2520	2755	3390	13,185.5
4	Hungary	Gábor Benedek	860.0	876	920	855	1126	4637.0
4	Hungary	János Bódy	772.5	752	820	795	1099	4238.5
4	Hungary	Antal Moldrich	95.0	938	720	1010	916	3679.0
4	Hungary	Total	1727.5	2566	2460	2660	3141	12,554.5
5	Mexico	José Pérez	937.5	690	800	940	712	4079.5
5	Mexico	Antonio Almada	395.0	814	960	935	622	3726.0
5	Mexico	David Romero	367.5	504	800	765	739	3175.5
5	Mexico	Total	1700.0	2008	2560	2640	2073	10,981.0
6	Romania	Cornel Vena	442.5	1062	740	750	1030	4024.5
6	Romania	Dumitru Țintea	717.5	380	780	815	718	3410.5
6	Romania	Victor Teodorescu	0.0	752	640	630	1156	3178.0
6	Romania	Total	1160.0	2194	2160	2195	2904	10,613.0
7	Great Britain	Donald Cobley	315.0	442	560	810	1255	3382.0
7	Great Britain	Thomas Hudson	20.0	504	440	990	1180	3134.0
7	Great Britain	George Norman	0.0	628	340	760	982	2710.0
7	Great Britain	Total	335.0	1574	1340	2560	3417	9,226.0
8	Australia	Neville Sayers	925.0	442	820	540	1024	3751.0
8	Australia	Sven Coomer	135.0	380	720	1015	751	3001.0
8	Australia	George Nicoll	0.0	442	500	665	466	2073.0
8	Australia	Total	1060.0	1264	2040	2220	2241	8,825.0
–	Sweden	Lars Hall	1035.0	889*	720	1030	1159	4833.0*
–	Sweden	Bertil Haase	515.0	667*	700	830	1216	3928.0*
–	Sweden	Björn Thofelt	0.0	Did not finish				0.0
–	Sweden	Total	1550.0	1556*	1420	1860	2375	8,761.0*
–	Chile	Gerardo Cortes, Sr.	882.5	556*	620	740	1051	3849.5*
–	Chile	Nilo Floody	585.0	704*	760	660	793	3502.0*
–	Chile	Héctor Carmona	Abandoned	Did not finish				0.0
–	Chile	Total	1467.5	1260*	1380	1400	1844	7,351.5*
–	Brazil	Salvio Lemos	455.0	556*	760	785	730	3286.0*
–	Brazil	Wenceslau Malta	0.0	741*	760	755	877	3133.0*
–	Brazil	Nilo da Silva	17.5	Did not finish				0.0
–	Brazil	Total	472.5	1297*	1520	1540	1607	6,419.0*
–	South Africa	Okkie van Greunen	195.0	704*	780	780	943	3402.0*
–	South Africa	Harry Schmidt	0.0	445*	0	460	661	1566.0*
–	South Africa	Marthinus du Plessis	Abandoned	Did not finish				0.0
–	South Africa	Total	195.0	1149*	780	1240	1604	4,968.0*

Unadjusted scores from the individual competition are shown with a "*".
