= Modern pentathlon at the 1956 Summer Olympics – Men's =

Men's modern pentathlon at the Games of the XVI Olympiad
- Venue: Oaklands Hunt Club; Swimming/Diving Stadium; Williamstown
- Dates: November 23–28
- Competitors: 40 from 16 nations

Medalists
1st place, gold medalist(s)		Lars Hall	Sweden
2nd place, silver medalist(s)		Olavi Mannonen	Finland
3rd place, bronze medalist(s)		Väinö Korhonen	Finland

The men's individual modern pentathlon was an event contested at the 1956 Summer Olympics in Melbourne. It was the ninth appearance of the individual modern pentathlon, which had been featured at every Summer Olympics since 1912. The individual scores were also used for the men's team event.

== Competition format ==
The modern pentathlon consisted of five events. The competition dropped the point-for-place system used in previous Games. The 1956 competition introduced a scoring system in which each of the results of each event was converted to a score, with a par value of 1,000 in each event, and higher scores were desirable.

- Riding: a show jumping competition. The course was 5000 m long, with a time limit of 10 minutes. Riders started with 1000 points; gaining or losing 2.5 points for every second under or over the time limit. They could also lose points through obstacle faults. Negative scores were not possible; the lowest score was 0.
- Fencing: a round-robin, one-touch épée competition. The par score of 1000 points was awarded for 26 victories (winning 75% of the fencer's 35 matches, as 36 competitors remained in the event at this stage). Each victory above or below that number adjusted the score by 37 points.
- Shooting: a rapid fire pistol competition, with 20 shots (each scoring up to 10 points) per competitor. A target score of 195 would give 1000 points; every target point above or below that resulted in a 20-point adjustment.
- Swimming: a 300 m freestyle swimming competition. The par time was 4 minutes, with every second above or below adjusting the score by 5 points.
- Running: a 4 km race. The par time was 15 minutes, with every second above or below adjusting the score by 3 points.

== Results ==
Rank	Athlete	Nation	Riding					Fencing			Shooting			Swimming			Running			Total
Rank	Athlete	Nation	Time	TS	F	Pts	Pl	Wins	Pts	Pl	Score	Pts	Pl	Time	Pts	Pl	Time	Pts	Pl	Total
1st place, gold medalist(s)	Lars Hall	Sweden	9:46	1035.0	0	1035.0	4	23	889	4	181	720	24	3:54.2	1030	2	14:07.4	1159	8	4833.0
2nd place, silver medalist(s)	Ole Mannonen	Finland	10:01	997.5	0	997.5	5	21	815	8	189	880	5	4:16.4	920	15	14:06.9	1162	7	4774.5
3rd place, bronze medalist(s)	Wäinö Korhonen	Finland	9:58	1005.0	120	885.0	9	25	963	2	189	880	5	4:19.5	905	16	14:21.0	1117	12	4750.0
4	Igor Novikov	Soviet Union	10:55	862.5	60	802.5	14	21	815	8	191	920	2	4:03.6	985	6	13:56.3	1192	4	4714.5
5	George Lambert	United States	9:32	1070.0	0	1070.0	1	17	667	17	190	900	4	4:05.8	975	7	14:33.2	1081	15	4693.0
6	Gábor Benedek	Hungary	10:56	860.0	0	860.0	11	23	889	4	191	920	2	4:29.8	855	18	14:18.4	1126	10	4650.0
7	William Andre	United States	9:57	1007.5	120	887.5	8	23	889	4	188	860	8	4:26.2	870	17	14:19.2	1123	11	4629.5
8	Aleksandr Tarasov	Soviet Union	10:44	890.0	80	810.0	13	20	778	10	189	880	5	4:35.0	825	21	13:58.1	1186	5	4479.0
9	Ivan Deriuhin	Soviet Union	11:02	845.0	0	845.0	12	14	556	26	184	780	16	3:46.7	1070	1	13:53.8	1201	3	4452.0
10	János Bódy	Hungary	10:43	892.5	120	772.5	15	23	889	4	186	820	10	4:41.3	795	24	14:27.8	1099	14	4375.5
11	Luis Ribera	Argentina	9:39	1052.5	0	1052.5	3	17	667	17	176	620	29	4:14.1	930	13	15:07.0	979	21	4248.5
12	José Pérez	Mexico	10:25	937.5	0	937.5	6	18	704	13	185	800	13	4:12.4	940	10	16:36.0	712	32	4093.5
13	Jack Daniels	United States	9:35	1062.5	0	1062.5	2	9	371	36	185	800	13	4:13.3	935	11	15:30.4	910	25	4078.5
14	Cornel Vena	Romania	13:11	522.5	80	442.5	22	29	1111	1	182	740	23	4:50.9	750	30	14:50.3	1030	17	4072.5
15	Adriano Facchini	Italy	11:41	747.5	80	667.5	17	17	667	17	186	820	10	4:10.3	950	9	15:23.8	931	23	4035.5
16	Berndt Katter	Finland	10:52	870.0	240	630.0	18	15	593	25	183	760	19	4:14.5	930	13	14:23.3	1111	13	4024.0
17	Bertil Haase	Sweden	12:18	655.0	140	515.0	20	17	667	17	180	700	27	4:34.7	830	20	13:48.5	1216	2	3928.0
18	Gerardo Cortes, Sr.	Chile	10:47	882.5	0	882.5	10	14	556	26	176	620	29	4:52.3	740	31	14:43.8	1051	16	3849.5
19	Neville Sayers	Australia	10:30	925.0	0	925.0	7	10	408	35	186	820	10	5:32.0	540	35	14:52.9	1024	18	3717.0
20	Dumitru Țintea	Romania	11:29	777.5	60	717.5	16	17	667	17	184	780	16	4:37.0	815	22	16:34.6	718	31	3697.5
21	Antal Moldrich	Hungary	14:10	375.0	280	95.0	30	24	926	3	181	720	24	3:58.3	1010	4	15:28.6	916	24	3667.0
22	Antonio Almada	Mexico	13:30	475.0	80	395.0	23	18	704	13	193	960	1	4:13.2	935	11	17:06.4	622	35	3616.0
23	Vladimír Černý	Czechoslovakia	14:27	332.5	200	132.5	29	14	556	26	188	860	8	4:08.9	960	8	14:56.7	1012	19	3520.5
24	Nilo Floody	Chile	10:54	865.0	280	585.0	19	18	704	13	183	760	19	5:08.5	660	33	16:09.9	793	27	3502.0
25	Donald Cobley	Great Britain	12:02	695.0	380	315.0	25	12	482	32	173	560	31	4:38.3	810	23	13:35.5	1255	1	3422.0
26	Okkie van Greunen	South Africa	14:10	375.0	180	195.0	27	18	704	13	184	780	16	4:44.1	780	26	15:19.7	943	22	3402.0
27	Salvio Lemos	Brazil	13:38	455.0	0	455.0	21	14	556	26	183	760	19	4:43.1	785	25	16:30.4	730	30	3286.0
28	Thomas Hudson	Great Britain	15:04	240.0	220	20.0	31	16	630	24	167	440	34	4:02.0	990	5	14:00.2	1180	6	3260.0
29	David Romero	Mexico	12:29	627.5	260	367.5	24	14	556	26	185	800	13	4:47.1	765	27	16:27.6	739	29	3227.5
30	Victor Teodorescu	Romania	18:10	0.0	180	0.0	33	19	741	11	177	640	28	5:14.5	630	34	14:08.1	1156	9	3167.0
31	Wenceslau Malta	Brazil	14:31	322.5	860	0.0	33	19	741	11	183	760	19	4:49.8	755	29	15:41.8	877	26	3133.0
32	Sven Coomer	Australia	15:46	135.0	0	135.0	28	12	482	32	181	720	24	3:57.4	1015	3	16:23.2	751	28	3103.0
33	Jean-Claude Hamel	France	14:49	277.5	80	197.5	26	17	667	17	169	480	33	4:30.0	850	19	16:43.1	691	33	2885.5
34	George Norman	Great Britain	17:16	0.0	0	0.0	33	17	667	17	162	340	35	4:48.1	760	28	15:06.7	982	20	2749.0
35	George Nicoll	Australia	21:39	0.0	320	0.0	33	13	519	31	170	500	32	5:07.7	665	32	17:58.1	466	36	2150.0
36	Harry Schmidt	South Africa	16:04	90.0	140	0.0	33	11	445	34	142	0	36	5:48.9	460	36	16:53.3	661	34	1566.0
–	Nilo da Silva	Brazil	14:49	277.5	260	17.5	32	Did not finish												17.5
–	Björn Thofelt	Sweden	18:40	0.0	140	0.0	33	Did not finish												0.0
–	Héctor Carmona	Chile	Abandoned					Did not finish												0.0
–	Marthinus du Plessis	South Africa	Abandoned					Did not finish												0.0
