= Venues of the 1956 Summer Olympics =

For the 1956 Summer Olympics, events were staged in a total of thirteen sports venues in Melbourne, Victoria, one in Ballarat, Victoria, and three sports venues in Stockholm, Sweden. The equestrian events took place in Stockholm in June 1956, due to Australia's strict quarantine laws on equestrianism, and the other Olympic events took place in Melbourne later in the year, between late November and early December.

== List of venues ==
=== Victoria, Australia ===
Venue	Sports	Capacity	Ref.
Broadmeadows	Cycling (road)	(Not listed)	
Lake Wendouree, Ballarat	Canoeing, Rowing	14,300	
Hockey Field	Field hockey	21,048	
Melbourne Cricket Ground	Athletics, Field hockey (final), Football (final)	104,000	
Oaklands Hunt Club	Modern pentathlon (riding, running)	25,700	
Olympic Park Stadium	Football	40,000	
Port Phillip	Sailing	(Not listed)	
Royal Australian Air Force, Laverton Air Base	Shooting (shotgun)	(Not listed)	
Royal Exhibition Building	Basketball (final), Modern pentathlon (fencing), Weightlifting, Wrestling	3,500	
St Kilda Town Hall	Fencing	(Not listed)	
Swimming/Diving Stadium	Diving, Modern pentathlon (swimming), Swimming, Water polo	6,000	
Velodrome	Cycling (track)	7,900	
West Melbourne Stadium	Basketball, Boxing, Gymnastics	7,000	
Williamstown	Modern pentathlon (shooting), Shooting (pistol, rifle)	(Not listed)	

=== Stockholm, Sweden ===
Venue	Sports	Capacity	Ref.
Lill-Jansskogen	Equestrian (eventing)	(Not listed)	
Olympic Stadium	Equestrian (dressage, eventing, jumping)	21,000	
Ulriksdal	Equestrian (eventing)	(Not listed)	

== Before the Olympics ==
Stockholm hosted the Summer Olympics in 1912. Because of Australia's strict quarantine laws on horses, the International Olympic Committee in Athens in May 1954 selected the host of the 1912 Games to run the equestrian events. Lake Wendouree was first used as a rowing venue in 1864 though the lake itself was not dammed and converted from a swamp until 1869 following a drought.

The Cricket Ground was established in 1854 after two previous grounds in use were ruled unsuitable. Football was first played at the Cricket Ground in 1859 while the first international cricket match in Australia took place in 1863. Cycling races first took place in 1869 while the first Test Match took place in 1877. Night football took place in 1879 while the first scoreboard in the world was erected in 1881 at the Cricket Ground along with sightboards and a telephone. Australia's first athletics championships were held at the Cricket Ground in 1893 with Edwin Flack winning the one mile event. Flack would win the 800 m and 1500 m events at the 1896 Summer Olympics in Athens. Lacrosse made its debut at the Cricket Ground in 1907 when Australia played Canada. In 1914, a baseball exhibition took place between the American Major League Baseball teams New York Giants and Chicago White Sox. Radio was first broadcast at the Cricket Ground in 1924. The inaugural women's Australian athletics championships took place in 1930. In 1935, the first women's cricket test match took place at the Cricket Grounds. During World War II in 1942-45, the Grounds were used as staging areas for Allied troops. Support was given for the 1956 Summer Games in 1953.

The first zoo in Melbourne was established in 1861. A cycling track was constructed in 1896. The official site was dedicated in 1909. Motorsports events took place at the park during the 1920s and 1930s. During World War II in 1941-6, the speedway was part of the Allied War effort. Construction of the venues used for the 1956 Summer Games began in 1951.

The Royal Exhibition Building was completed in 1880. World's Fairs were held there in 1880 and in 1888. During the Great Influenza Epidemic of 1919, the Exhibition Building was commandeered for medical usage. By the 1940s, the building's condition had deteriorated to where it was referred as a "white elephant".

== During the Olympics ==
Although cricket has not been part of an Olympic Games since 1900, the Cricket Ground was a versatile venue for the 1956 Games. The Cricket Ground hosted between 85,001 and 107,100 for the athletic events. Between 10,805 and 16,626 spectators attended the field hockey semifinals and medal matches. The football final had an attendance of 104,700 spectators where the Soviet Union defeated Yugoslavia 4-1.

The Olympic Park hosted aquatics, football, field hockey, and track cycling events during the 1956 Summer Games.

== After the Olympics ==
A few of the venues that were used for the 1956 Olympics still survive. The former Olympic Swimming and Diving Stadium remains as part of the Holden Centre at the Olympic Park complex. The former athletes' village in Heidelberg West remains as public housing, and the small stadium there is home to the local football team, Heidelberg United FC.

Some of the buildings that predate the Olympics still stand, such as St Kilda Town Hall (where the fencing events were held) and West Melbourne Stadium (subsequently renamed Festival Hall).

Tennis debuted at the Olympic Park Stadium in 1985, and it then became a permanent venue for the Australian Open at Flinders Park. The stadium has expanded to host other sports and musical events.

Restoration work began on the Royal Exhibition Building in 1985 and was completed during the 1990s. It is now a World Heritage Site as of July 2004.

=== Melbourne Cricket Ground ===
The Queen Mother visited the cricket ground in 1958; the following year, Billy Graham hosted the greatest attendance of the Grounds' history with an audience of 130,000. David Cassidy was the first musical act to perform at the Grounds in 1974.

Following the 1956 Olympics, the stands were expanded and renovated, with work continuing until the early 1990s. The manual scoreboard was replaced in 1982 by an electronic scoreboard made by Mitsubishi, and a still more advanced version was installed ten years later. Another scoreboard, supplied by Sony, was installed at the south part of the Cricket Ground in 1994. The Olympic Flame returned to the Grounds on 30 July 2000 during the torch relay for the 2000 Summer Olympics, for the first time since the 1956 Games, and the Cricket Ground served as host for several football preliminary matches during the Sydney Games. The flame returned once again for the 2004 Summer Olympics, however the Olympic Stand was demolished in 2004.

The Cricket Ground served as the main venue for the 2006 Commonwealth Games.
