= Pachomius (disambiguation) =

Saint Pachomius the Great (ca. 292 – 348), also known as Abba Pachomius and Pakhom, is the founder of Christian cenobitic monasticism.

Pachomius may also refer to:

== People ==
- Pachomius the Serb (Пахомий Серб, also known as Pachomius Logothete), fifteenth century hagiographer in the employ of the Russian Orthodox Church
- Patriarch Pachomius I of Constantinople, reigned 1503-1504 and 1504-1513
- Patriarch Pachomius II of Constantinople, reigned 1584-1585
- Hieromonk Pahomije, 16th century Serbian printer
- Metropolitan Pachomius of Behira, also known as "Anba Pachomius", a Coptic Christian Bishop

== Other ==
- Pachomius (spider), a genus of jumping spiders

== See also ==
- Pacôme, French name
- Pakhomov, Russian name
