= 1957 World Modern Pentathlon Championships =

The 1957 World Modern Pentathlon Championships were held from 26-30 October, 1957, in Stockholm, Sweden.

== Medal summary ==
=== Men's events ===
Event	(gold) Gold	(silver) Silver	(bronze) Bronze
Individual	Igor Novikov (URS)	Aleksandr Tarasov (URS)	Nikolay Tatarinov (URS)
Team	Soviet Union; Aleksandr Tarasov; Nikolay Tatarinov; Igor Novikov	Finland; Eero Lohi; Kalevi Pakarinen; Väinö Korhonen	Hungary; János Bódi; Géza Ferdinandy; Sándor Szabó

== Medal table ==
Rank	Nation	Gold	Silver	Bronze	Total
1	Soviet Union (URS)	2	1	1	4
2	Finland (FIN)	0	1	0	1
3	Hungary (HUN)	0	0	1	1
Totals (3 entries)		2	2	2	6

== See also ==
- World Modern Pentathlon Championships
