= Okkie =

Okkie is a Dutch given name, a diminutive of Ockert or Ocker/Okker. Notable people with the name include:

- Okkie Formenoij (1899–1977), Dutch association football player
- Okkie van Greunen (1933–1987), South African modern pentathlete
