= 1959 World Modern Pentathlon Championships =

The 1959 World Modern Pentathlon Championships were held in Hershey, Pennsylvania, United States from 25-30 September, 1959.

== Medal summary ==
=== Men's events ===
Event	(gold) Gold	(silver) Silver	(bronze) Bronze
Individual	Igor Novikov (URS)	András Balczó (HUN)	Aleksandr Tarasov (URS)
Team	Soviet Union; Aleksandr Tarasov; Nikolay Tatarinov; Igor Novikov	Finland; Tapio Kare; Berndt Katter; Väinö Korhonen	United States; Leslie Bleamaster; George Lambert Jr. Robert Miller

== Medal table ==
Rank	Nation	Gold	Silver	Bronze	Total
1	Soviet Union (URS)	2	0	1	3
2	Finland (FIN)	0	1	0	1
2	Hungary (HUN)	0	1	0	1
4	United States (USA)	0	0	1	1
Totals (4 entries)		2	2	2	6

== See also ==
- World Modern Pentathlon Championships
