= Katter =

Katter is a surname. Notable people with the surname include:

- Berndt Katter (1932–2014), athlete
- Bob Katter (born 1945), politician
- Bob Katter Sr. (1918–1990), politician
- Carl Katter (born 1978), activist
- Katter's Australian Party
- Robbie Katter (born 1977), politician
- Thomas Katter (1959–2010), musician

== See also ==
- Ketter
