= Koetter =

Koetter is a surname. Notable people with the surname include:

- Dirk Koetter (born 1959), American football coach
- Jim Koetter (1937–2025), American football coach

== See also ==
- Ketter
