= Pakhomov =

Pakhomov (Russian: Пахо́мов) is a Russian surname. The female form is Pakhomova (Russian: Пахо́мова). The surname came from Pakhom (Russian: Пахо́м), a Russian adaptation of the Coptic-Greek name Παχώμιος. Notable people with the surname include:

- Alexei Pakhomov (1900–1973), Russian painter
- Alexei Pakhomov (pilot) (1912–1968), Soviet fighter pilot and air force general
- Alexey Pakhomov (born 1945), Russian politician
- Anatoly Pakhomov (born 1960), Russian politician
- Boris Pakhomov (1931–2005), Soviet pentathlete
- Daniil Pakhomov (born 1998), Russian swimmer
- Leonid Pakhomov (born 1943), Russian football manager
- Lyudmila Pakhomova (1946–1986), Soviet ice dancer and the 1976 Olympic champion
- Nikolay Pakhomov (1893−1938), Soviet government official
- Yevgeni Pakhomov (1880–1965), Russian numismatist
