= Olympics cultural programme =

Cultural programmes of the Olympic Games have taken various forms over the years. From 1912 until shortly after the Second World War in 1948, art competitions were held to accompany the Summer Olympics. Since 1952 a series of cultural events has been programmed in the years before and during each event. From the 1990s until the 2010s they have been called the Cultural Olympiad or Olympic Arts Festival, but more recently termed the Cultural Programme of the Olympics. There have also been some cultural programmes associated with Winter Olympics in some locations.

== Ancient Olympics ==
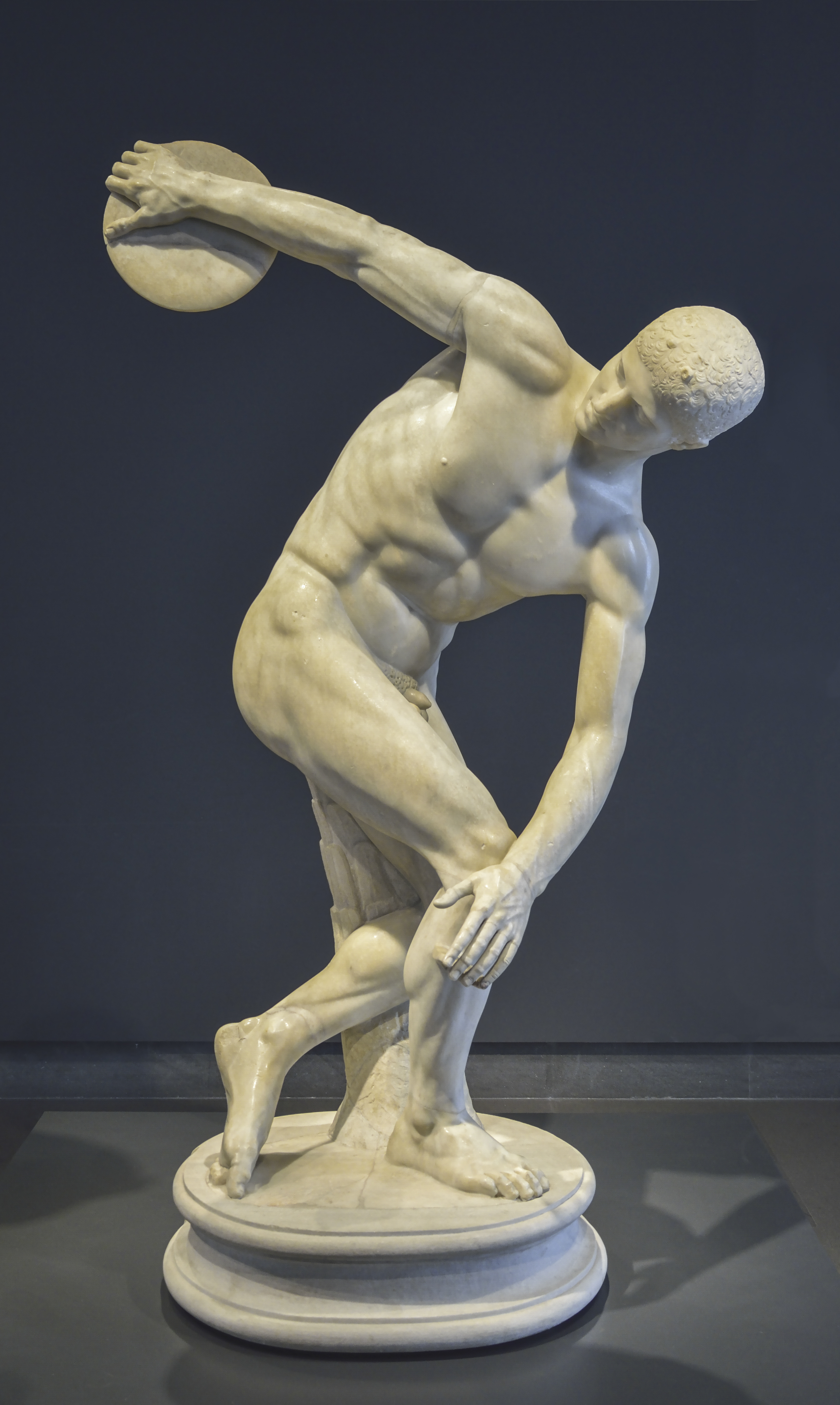
The Discobolus, a Greek statue from the 5th century BC, representing a discus thrower. The image shows a Roman marble version of the now-lost bronze original.

The Ancient Olympic Games, held in Olympia, Greece, were as much a religious festival as an athletic event. The games were held in honour of the Greek god Zeus, and on the middle day of the games, 100 oxen would be sacrificed to him. Over time, Olympia became a central spot for the worship of the head of the Greek pantheon and a temple, built by the Greek architect Libon, was erected on the mountaintop. The temple was one of the largest Doric temples in Greece. The sculptor Pheidias created a statue of Zeus made of gold and ivory. It stood 42 feet (13 m) tall. It was placed on a throne in the temple. The statue became one of the seven wonders of the ancient world.

Artistic expression was a major part of the games, and cultural events were celebrated. Sculptors, poets, painters, and other artisans would come to the games to display their works in what became an artistic competition. Poets would be commissioned to write poems in praise of the Olympic victors, known as epinikions, which were passed on from generation to generation.

== Modern Olympics ==
=== Competitions (1912–1948) ===
Baron Pierre de Coubertin, who founded the modern Olympic Games, proposed including the arts in the Olympics, returning to the ancient tradition in Olympia, where both cultural events and physical feats were celebrated. At a 1906 conference in Paris, with unanimous approval from all participants (including 30 artists and five IOC members), a project was launched to establish five arts competitions as part of the Olympic Games: in architecture, sculpture, painting, literature, and music, the Olympic art competitions. Entries had to be on subjects chosen inspired by or related to sport, and the first official programme was presented during the 1912 Games in Stockholm. These competitions were also named the "Pentathlon of the Muses", as their purpose was to bring artists to present their work and compete for "art" medals across five categories: architecture, music, literature, sculpture and painting. At the Los Angeles Olympics in 1932, 31 countries participated, with 1,100 artworks exhibited at the Los Angeles Museum, attracting 384,000 attendees.

=== Festivals and the Cultural Olympiad (1952–) ===
After the hiatus in the Olympics caused by World War II, the popularity of the competitions diminished, and the last one was held in 1948. In 1952 the Organising Committee of the Olympic Games (OCOG) of the Helsinki games decided to drop the arts programme. However From 1954 to 1990, the IOC asked each OCOG to organise a programme of arts events that showcased the best of the host country's culture as well as encouraging international understanding. The 1968 Summer Olympics in Mexico held a major Festival of Performing Arts, a festival of children's painting with entries from 47 countries, and a World Folklore Festival.

From the Barcelona Olympics in 1992, a "Cultural Olympiad" started being held to accompany the Olympic Games. Presenting an interdisciplinary programme, these cultural events are organised by the OCOG during the preceding four years to each Games as well as a series of major events to coincide with the sports events. They are not connected to sport, and are not competitive, instead promoting the host nation's culture and increasing interest and enjoyment of the Olympics for attendees.

The 2012 Olympics included an extensive Cultural Olympiad with the London 2012 Festival in the host city, and events elsewhere including the World Shakespeare Festival produced by the RSC. The 2016 games' Cultural Olympiad was scaled back due to Brazil's recession; there was no published programme, with director Carla Camurati promising "secret" and "spontaneous" events such as flash mobs.

Cultural events in time for the 2020 Summer Olympics in Tokyo were planned before being canceled due to pandemic restrictions in Japan. Instead, an alternative virtual event was held.

The term "Cultural Olympiad" has been largely replaced by "Cultural Programme", which starts about four years before the Games. Around two months before the Games, the "Culture Festival" is launched, lasting until the end of the Paralympic Games. In 2020, a new strategy was announced as part of Olympic Agenda 2020, via Recommendation 26, which aims to "further strengthen the alliance of sport and culture at the Olympic Games and between their different editions". The Olympic Foundation for Culture and Heritage reinforced its own cultural policy as part of this new strategy.

== Examples ==
=== Summer Olympics ===
- 1956: Melbourne Olympic Arts Festival, Melbourne, Australia
- 1984: Los Angeles Olympic Arts Festival, Los Angeles, US
- 2000: Sydney Olympic Arts Festival, Sydney, Australia
- 2012: 2012 Cultural Olympiad, London, UK

=== Winter Olympics ===
- Cultural Olympiad Digital Edition, for the 2010 Winter Olympics in Vancouver, Canada
- 2002 Cultural Olympiad, for the 2002 Winter Olympics in Salt Lake City, Utah, US
