= Valery Grechikhin =

Russian chess grandmaster (1937–2008)

Personal information
- Born: Valery Dmitrievich Grechikhin; 6 September 1937 Kuybyshev, Russian SFSR, Soviet Union
- Died: 13 May 2008 (aged 70)

Chess career
- Country: Soviet Union (until 1991); Russia (after 1991)
- Title: Grandmaster (1998)
- Peak rating: 2591 (July 2002)

Valery Dmitrievich Grechikhin (Russian: Валерий Дмитриевич Гречихин; 6 September 1937 – 13 May 2008) was a Soviet and Russian chess player who held the title of Grandmaster (1998).

== Biography ==
Grechikhin was born in 1937 in Kuybyshev (now Samara). In his childhood, he attended the chess section of the Kuybyshev Palace of Pioneers under coach Fyodor Sergeyevich Berkov. After graduating from the Kuybyshev Institute of Civil Engineering (now part of Samara State Technical University) in 1959, he worked as head of the construction department at the Privolzhgiproselkhozstroy research institute.

He fulfilled the norm for Master of Sport of the USSR (1981) at the championship of the Lokomotiv sports society, and later earned the International Master (1996) and Grandmaster (1998) titles. At the regional level, Grechikhin won the Kuybyshev city championship four times (1963, 1972, 1974, and 1985) and the Kuybyshev Oblast championship twice (1969 and 1972).

Grechikhin lost his hearing as a result of complications from influenza and unsuccessful medical treatment. He became the third deaf Grandmaster in history to compete in regular tournaments among hearing players, after Boris Verlinsky and Yehuda Gruenfeld. In 2002, he represented the International Committee of Silent Chess (ICSC) team at the 35th Chess Olympiad in Bled, Slovenia.

== Competitive results ==
Year	City	Tournament	+	Draws	-	Score	Place
2000	(Russia) Samara	53rd Russian Chess Championship	0	5	6	2½/11	62
2002	(Slovenia) Bled	35th Chess Olympiad (ICSC)	0	6	3	3/9	86
