= 1958 World Modern Pentathlon Championships =

The 1958 World Modern Pentathlon Championships were held in Aldershot, England, Great Britain from 13-17 October, 1958.

== Medal summary ==
=== Men's events ===
Event	(gold) Gold	(silver) Silver	(bronze) Bronze
Individual	Igor Novikov (URS)	Kurt Lindeman (FIN)	Aleksandr Tarasov (URS)
Team	Soviet Union; Aleksandr Tarasov; Nikolay Tatarinov; Igor Novikov	Hungary; András Balczó; Aladar Kovácsi; Imre Nagy	Finland; Eero Lohi; Kurt Lindeman; Väinö Korhonen

== Medal table ==
Rank	Nation	Gold	Silver	Bronze	Total
1	Soviet Union (URS)	2	0	1	3
2	Finland (FIN)	0	1	1	2
3	Hungary (HUN)	0	1	0	1
Totals (3 entries)		2	2	2	6

== See also ==
- World Modern Pentathlon Championships
