= Vagiz Mingazov =

Russian politician (born 1955)

- Вагиз Мингазов
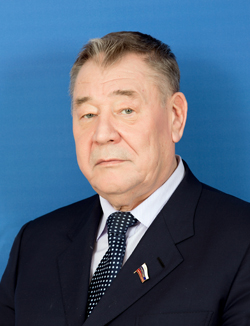

Senator from Tatarstan
- In office 1 December 2011 – 23 June 2014
- Preceded by: Alexey Pakhomov
- Succeeded by: Ildus Akhmetzyanov

Personal details
- Born: Vagiz Mingazov; 11 December 1955 (age 70) Xäsänşäyex, Arsky District, Russian SFSR, Soviet Union
- Education: Kazan State Academy of Veterinary Medicine

Vagiz Vasilovich Mingazov (Russian: Вагиз Василович Мингазов; born 11 December 1955) is a Russian politician who served as a senator from Tatarstan from 2011 to 2014.

== Career ==
Vagiz Mingazov was born on 11 December 1955 in Xäsänşäyex, Arsky District. In 1973, he graduated from the Kazan State Academy of Veterinary Medicine. After graduation, he worked as the first secretary of the Arsky district committee of the CPSU. From 1992 to 1998, he was also the head of the administration of the Arsky District. From 2004 to 2011, he was a deputy of the third and fourth convocations of the State Council of the Republic of Tatarstan. At the same time, from 2006 to 2011, he was the general director of the JSC "VAMIN Tatarstan". From 2011 to 2014, he represented Tatarstan in the Federation Council.
