= Alexey Pakhomov =

Russian politician (born 1945)

- Алексей Пахомов
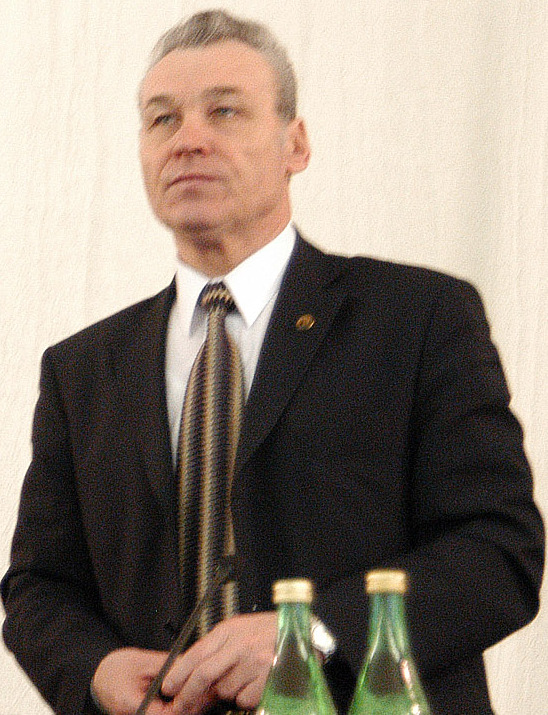

Senator from Tatarstan
- In office 8 June 2005 – 1 December 2011
- Preceded by: Irina Larochkina
- Succeeded by: Vagiz Mingazov

Personal details
- Born: Alexey Pakhomov; 15 January 1945 (age 81) Kinel-Cherkassky District, Samara Oblast, Russian SFSR, Soviet Union
- Education: Samara State Technical University

Alexey Mikhailovich Pakhomov (Russian: Алексей Михайлович Пахомов; born 15 January 1945) is a Russian politician who served as a senator from Tatarstan from 2005 to 2011.

== Career ==
Alexey Pakhomov was born on 15 January 1945 in Kinel-Cherkassky District, Samara Oblast. He graduated from the Samara State Technical University. From 1971 to 1992, he occupied leadership positions at the local factory. In 2002, he became the Deputy Prime Minister of the Republic of Tatarstan. From 2005 to 2011, he represented Tatarstan in the Federation Council.
