= John Ian Wing =

Australian-born British Olympic medal recipient

John Ian Wing (born 18 November 1939) is an Olympic bronze medal recipient and an Australian-born British resident of Chinese descent who, as a student in Australia in 1956, wrote an anonymous letter to the International Olympic Committee suggesting the athletes from all countries mingle during the closing parade of the Summer Olympics held in Melbourne that year. His idea was used that Olympiad and has remained an Olympic tradition since that time.

== Life ==
Born John Wing in Windsor, Melbourne, he was only a few days old when his mother died. His father placed him in the Melbourne Children's Home and he remained there for several years. The name Ian was given to him by staff at the Home, as there were already many other boys at the Home named John. When his father remarried he was removed from the Home and sent back to his family, who lived above his father's Chinese cafe in Bourke Street, Melbourne.

== 1956 Summer Olympics ==
Just days before the closing ceremony of the 1956 Summer Olympics at Melbourne, the Olympic committee received an anonymous letter. This letter encouraged the Olympics to do something they had never done before – the athletes must not march but walk freely and wave to the public during the closing ceremonies. It was a suggestion that would bring all the athletes together as a symbol of global unity; the suggestion was adopted and Olympic teams have done so ever since.

Thirty years later, a Chinese individual named John Ian Wing revealed himself to the world as having written the letter and became a hero of the Olympic Games. He became recognised with an Olympic medal for his historic contribution to the Olympic Games. At the time of the letter, Wing was a 17-year-old apprentice carpenter. He did not state who he was because he did not want his family to know he had written such a letter. Distinguishing oneself by presenting one's ideas (even good ideas) to important people would have been considered impertinent and rude. According to another memoir, he was also worried that the officials would think it was a "dumb idea". With all the media attention he wrote a second letter, including his name and address, and explaining why he had wanted to remain anonymous. John's idea has become an Olympic tradition and were especially appropriate for Melbourne's "Friendly Games".

Wing later revealed that his idea was inspired by his observations of crowds attending the nearby Palace Theatre (then known as the St James cinema) which was located two doors from the restaurant in Bourke Street where he lived.

A street in the former Athlete's Village at the site of the 2000 Summer Olympics at Sydney has been named John Ian Wing Parade in his honour.

== Olympic Medal ==
Wing was given a bronze Olympic medal by the Games' chairman Wilfrid Kent Hughes.
