= Luis Carmona =

Chilean modern pentathlete (1923–2019)

Personal information
- Full name: Luis Carmona Barrales
- Born: 15 February 1923
- Died: 7 November 2019 (aged 96)
- Relative: Héctor Carmona

Sport
- Sport: Modern pentathlon

Luis Carmona (15 February 1923 – 7 November 2019) was a Chilean modern pentathlete. He competed at the 1952 Summer Olympics.
