= Pachomius nigrus =

Scientific classification
- Kingdom: Animalia
- Phylum: Arthropoda
- Subphylum: Chelicerata
- Class: Arachnida
- Order: Araneae
- Infraorder: Araneomorphae
- Family: Salticidae
- Genus: Pachomius
- Species: P. nigrus

Binomial name
- Pachomius nigrus (Caporiacco, 1947)

Species of spider

Pachomius nigrus (syn. Romitia nigra) is a jumping spider and the type species of the genus Pachomius (syn. Romitia). It is found in Guyana and French Guiana.
