= 1955 World Modern Pentathlon Championships =

The 1955 World Modern Pentathlon Championships were held in Zurich, Switzerland from 22 – 26 October, 1955.

== Medal summary ==
=== Men's events ===
Event	(gold) Gold	(silver) Silver	(bronze) Bronze
Individual	Konstantin Salnikov (URS)	Olavi Mannonen (FIN)	Aladar Kovácsi (HUN)
Team	Hungary; István Szondy; Géza Ferdinandy; Aladar Kovácsi	Soviet Union; Pavel Rakityansky; Konstantin Salnikov; Igor Novikov	Switzerland; Hansueli Glogg; Erhard Minder; Werner Vetterli

== Medal table ==
Rank	Nation	Gold	Silver	Bronze	Total
1	Soviet Union (URS)	1	1	0	2
2	Hungary (HUN)	1	0	1	2
3	Finland (FIN)	0	1	0	1
4	Switzerland (SUI)	0	0	1	1
Totals (4 entries)		2	2	2	6

== See also ==
- World Modern Pentathlon Championships
