= Ockert =

Ockert is a given name and surname that may refer to

Given name

- Ockert Cilliers (born 1981), South African sprinter
- Ockert Erasmus (born 1988), South African cricketer
- Ockert van Greunen (1933–1987), South African modern pentathlete

Surname

- Darren Ockert, English pop singer, songwriter and producer
