= Aladár Kovácsi =

Hungarian modern pentathlete (1932–2010)

Personal information
- Born: 11 December 1932 Budapest, Kingdom of Hungary
- Died: 8 April 2010 (aged 77) Budapest, Hungary

Sport
- Sport: Modern pentathlon
Medal record
Men's modern pentathlon
Representing Hungary
Olympic Games
Gold medal – first place	1952 Helsinki	Team
World Championships
Gold medal – first place	1955 Zürich	Team
Silver medal – second place	1958 Aldershot	Team
Bronze medal – third place	1955 Zürich	Individual

Aladár Kovácsi (11 December 1932 – 8 April 2010) was a Hungarian modern pentathlete and Olympic champion.

== Olympics ==
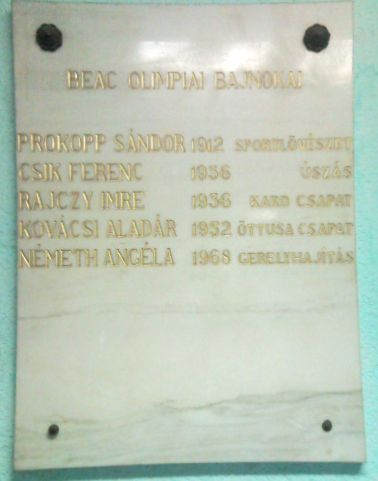
Commemorative plaque of the BEAC olympic champions in Budapest District XI, Bogdánfy Street No 10.

Kovácsi won a gold medal in the modern pentathlon at the 1952 Summer Olympics in Helsinki with the Hungarian team.
