= Ketterer =

Ketterer is a German-language surname. It is a variant of Ketter, with the patronymic suffix -er added. Related surnames include Kätterer and Ketterle. Notable people with the surname include:

- Andrew Ketterer, American lawyer and politician
- Emil Ketterer (1883–1959), German track and field athlete
- Eugène Ketterer (1831–1870), French composer and pianist
- Franz Ketterer (1676–1749), German clockmaker
- Logan Ketterer, American soccer player
- Markus Ketterer (born 1967), Finnish ice hockey player
- Reinhard Ketterer (born 1948), German figure skater
- Roman Norbert Ketterer, German auctioneer, gallery owner and art dealer
- Sepp Ketterer (1899–1991), German-born Austrian cinematographer
- Theodor Ketterer (1815–1884), German clockmaker
