= 1961 World Modern Pentathlon Championships =

The 1961 World Modern Pentathlon Championships were held in Moscow, Soviet Union.

== Medal summary ==
=== Men's events ===
Event	(gold) Gold	(silver) Silver	(bronze) Bronze
Individual	Igor Novikov (URS)	Ivan Deryugin (URS)	András Balczó (HUN)
Team	Soviet Union; Ivan Deryugin; Boris Pachomov; Igor Novikov	Hungary; Ferenc Török; Imre Nagy; András Balczó	United States; Robert Beck; Allan Jackson; Richard Stohl

== Medal table ==
Rank	Nation	Gold	Silver	Bronze	Total
1	Soviet Union (URS)	2	1	0	3
2	Hungary (HUN)	0	1	1	2
3	United States (USA)	0	0	1	1
Totals (3 entries)		2	2	2	6

== See also ==
- World Modern Pentathlon Championships
