= Victor Teodorescu =

Romanian modern pentathlete (born 1925)

Personal information
- Born: 1925 Olteniţa, Romania

Sport
- Sport: Modern pentathlon

Victor Teodorescu (born 1925) is a Romanian modern pentathlete. He competed at the 1956 Summer Olympics.
