= Igor Novikov (pentathlete) =

Soviet modern pentathlete

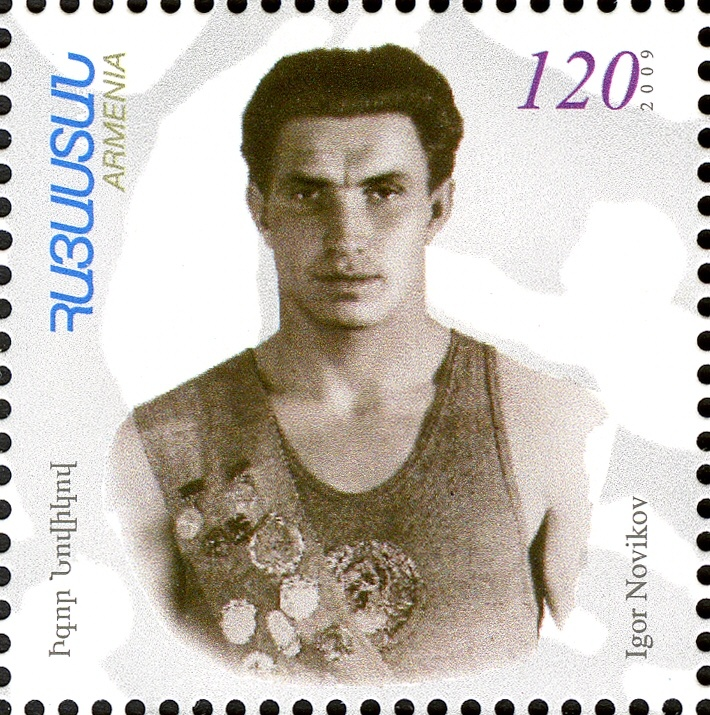
- Igor Novikov on a 2009 Armenian stamp

Personal information
- Born: Igor Aleksandrovich Novikov; 19 October 1929 Drezna, Orekhovo-Zuyevsky District, Moscow Oblast, Russian SFSR, Soviet Union
- Died: 30 August 2007 (aged 77) Saint Petersburg, Russia
- Height: 1.84 m (6 ft 0 in)
- Weight: 80 kg (180 lb)

Sport
- Sport: Modern pentathlon
- Club: Dynamo Yerevan
Medal record
Representing Soviet Union
Olympic Games
Gold medal – first place	1956 Melbourne	Team
Gold medal – first place	1964 Tokyo	Team
Silver medal – second place	1960 Rome	Team
Silver medal – second place	1964 Tokyo	Individual
World Championships
Gold medal – first place	1957 Stockholm	Individual
Gold medal – first place	1957 Stockholm	Team
Gold medal – first place	1958 Aldershot	Individual
Gold medal – first place	1958 Aldershot	Team
Gold medal – first place	1959 Hershey	Individual
Gold medal – first place	1959 Hershey	Team
Gold medal – first place	1961 Moscow	Individual
Gold medal – first place	1961 Moscow	Team
Gold medal – first place	1962 Mexico City	Team
Silver medal – second place	1955 Zürich	Team
Silver medal – second place	1962 Mexico City	Individual
Silver medal – second place	1963 Magglingen	Team
Silver medal – second place	1965 Leipzig	Individual
Silver medal – second place	1965 Leipzig	Team
Bronze medal – third place	1963 Magglingen	Individual

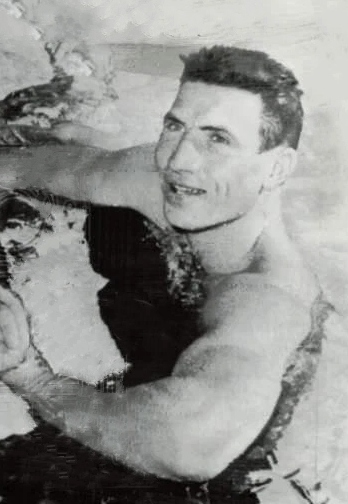
Novikov at the 1960 Olympics

Igor Aleksandrovich Novikov (Russian: Игорь Александрович Новиков, 19 October 1929 – 30 August 2007) was a Soviet modern pentathlete and Olympic Champion. He competed at the 1956 Summer Olympics in Melbourne, where he won a gold medal in the team competition (together with Aleksandr Tarasov and Ivan Deriuhin. He won a silver medal at the 1960 Summer Olympics in Rome, and he competed at the 1964 Summer Olympics in Tokyo, where he won a gold medal in the team competition (together with Albert Mokeyev and Viktor Mineyev), and a silver medal in the individual competition.

When Novikov was 5 years old, his family moved from Russia to Armenia and lived there for decades. The whole family practised a wide range of sports at different levels. His father was an amateur football player and sports shooter. Brother Boris was a heavyweight boxer and a regional champion. Another brother Vladimir competed in football, swimming and boxing. Sister Lyudmila played volleyball and climbed mountains, and the other sister Zhenya was Armenian champion in artistic gymnastics for several years.

Novikov was jokingly called a "Russian son of Armenian people". This nickname he received in 1964, after meeting Anastas Mikoyan, who praised his sports achievements and knowledge of Armenian language.

After retiring from competitions, Novikov worked as a modern pentathlon coach and administrator, in Armenia and then in Russia. Between 1977 and 1991 he was president of the Soviet Modern Pentathlon Federation, and from 1988 to 1992 president of the Union Internationale de Pentathlon Moderne.
