= Cornel Vena =

Romanian modern pentathlete

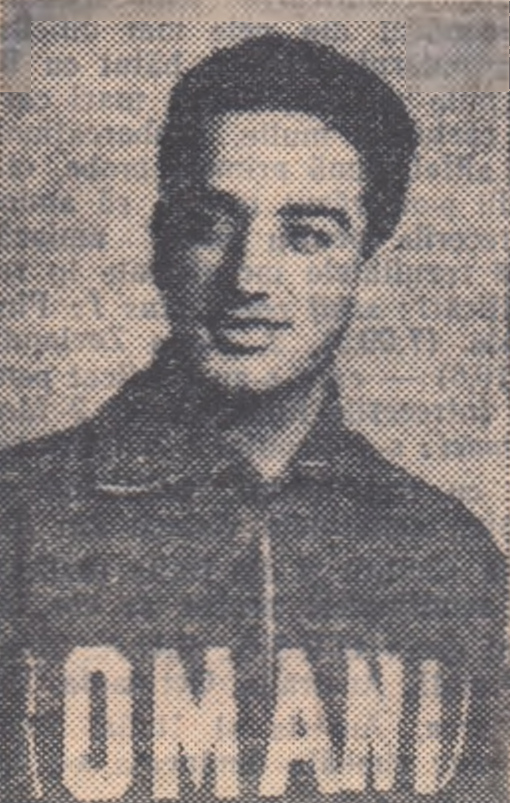
- Vena in 1956

Personal information
- Born: 20 October 1932 Sibiu, Romania
- Died: 18 April 2017 (aged 84)

Sport
- Sport: Modern pentathlon

Cornel Vena (20 October 1932 – 18 April 2017) was a Romanian modern pentathlete. He competed at the 1956 Summer Olympics.

In 1954, Vena won the first Romanian Pentathlon Championship. Vena was the first Romanian national champion in 1955. He also won the National Triathlon Competition (swimming, running, shooting). In 1956, as part of the Romanian team, he competed at the Melbourne Olympics in the pentathlon (riding, swimming, running, shooting, fencing) and won the fencing. His fencing result has become the longest standing record in the history of the modern Olympic Games.

He won 29 of 35 bouts in fencing, scoring a total of 1,111 points. This is the best known performance in Olympic modern pentathlon fencing, winning 82.9% of his bouts, and the highest ever points score awarded in fencing in the Olympic modern pentathlon.

Vena became Australian fencing champion in 1957, and won the team epee and foil championship in 1962, dominating modern pentathlon competition between 1971 and 1979.

In 1997, the Ministry of Youth and Sports of Romania retroactively awarded Cornel Vena the title of master of sports. Vena coached aspiring fencers for sixty years.
