= William Andre =

American modern pentathlete and fencer (1931–2019)

Personal information
- Born: August 23, 1931 Montclair, New Jersey, U.S.
- Died: October 17, 2019 (aged 88)

Sport
- Sport: Modern pentathlon
Medal record
Men's modern pentathlon
Representing United States
Olympic Games
Silver medal – second place	1956 Melbourne	Team

William Andre (August 23, 1931 – October 17, 2019), commonly known as "Bill", was an American fencer and modern pentathlete. Born in Montclair, New Jersey, he won an individual bronze medal at the 1953 world championships. While a lieutenant in the US Navy, he was selected as part of the US team for the 1956 Summer Olympics, at which the team won a silver medal. He finished seventh in the individual event. In the same year, he finished second in the épée at the AFLA national fencing championships.
