= George Norman (pentathlete) =

Modern pentathlete

Personal information
- Born: 17 June 1927 York, England
- Died: 13 October 2012 (aged 85)

Sport
- Sport: Modern pentathlon

George Norman (17 June 1927 – 13 October 2012) was a British modern pentathlete. He competed at the 1956 Summer Olympics.
