= Terry Nicoll =

Australian modern pentathlete (1933–2024)

Personal information
- Full name: George Terence Nicoll
- Born: 22 August 1933 Sydney, New South Wales, Australia
- Died: 9 December 2024 (aged 91) Kiama, New South Wales, Australia

Sport
- Sport: Modern pentathlon

George Terence Nicoll (22 August 1933 – 9 December 2024) was an Australian modern pentathlete. He competed at the 1956 Summer Olympics. He died in Kiama, New South Wales on 9 December 2024, at the age of 91.
