= Olavi Mannonen =

Finnish modern pentathlete (1930–2019)

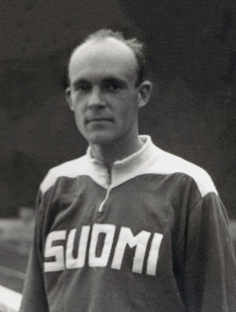

Personal information
- Born: 7 March 1930 Viipuri, Finland
- Died: 17 March 2019 (aged 89) Helsinki, Finland
- Height: 182 cm (6 ft 0 in)
- Weight: 72–74 kg (159–163 lb)

Sport
- Sport: Modern pentathlon
Medal record
Representing Finland
Olympic Games
Silver medal – second place	1956 Melbourne	Individual
Bronze medal – third place	1952 Helsinki	Team
Bronze medal – third place	1956 Melbourne	Team
World Modern Pentathlon Championships
Silver medal – second place	1955 Macolin	Individual

Olavi Aleksanteri "Ole" Mannonen (7 March 1930 – 17 March 2019) was a Finnish modern pentathlete who competed at the 1952 and 1956 Summer Olympics. He won a bronze medal in the team event in 1952 and 1956 and an individual silver in 1956; he placed fifth individually in 1952.

Mannonen also won an individual silver at the 1955 World Championships. Domestically, he won the Finnish title in 1953 and 1956, finishing second in 1952, 1955 and 1960. He was selected as the best Finnish modern pentathlete of the year in 1952-53 and 1955-56. Since 1952 Mannonen worked at the Helsinki mounted police, becoming its head in 1971, and retiring in 1990.
