= Marthinus du Plessis =

South African modern pentathlete

Personal information
- Full name: Marthinus Johannes du Plessis
- Born: 2 June 1932
- Died: 21 June 2011 (aged 79)

Sport
- Sport: Modern pentathlon

Marthinus du Plessis (2 June 1932 – 21 June 2011) was a South African modern pentathlete. He competed at the 1956 Summer Olympics.
