= Pacôme =

Pacôme is a French masculine given name, and sometimes surname, taken from the French spelling of Pachomius, primarily in reference to Saint-Pacôme, Pachomius the Great.

First name:

- Éric Pacôme N'Dri (1978) Ivorian 100 metres runner
- Pacôme Agboke (born 1991), Ivorian footballer
- Pacôme Assi (born 1981), French kickboxer
- Pacôme Dadiet (born 2005), French basketball player
- Pacôme Moubelet-Boubeya (born 1963), Gabonese politician
- Pacôme Rupin (born 1985), French politician

Surname:

- Charles Pacôme (1902-1978) French wrestler

== See also ==
- Saint-Pacôme, Quebec in the Kamouraska Regional County Municipality
