= Khasanshaikh =

Khasanshaikh Хасаншаих
- Rural locality

Other transcription(s)
  - Tatar: Хәсәншәех
- Interactive map of Khasanshaikh
- Location of Khasanshaikh
- Coordinates: 56°21′37.48″N 50°1′8.26″E
- Country: Russia
- Federal subject: Tatarstan
- Time zone: UTC+3 (MSK)
- Postal code: 422007
- OKTMO ID: 92612403111

Khasanshaikh (Tatar: Хәсәншәех, romanized: Xäsänşäyex; Russian: Хасаншаих) is a rural locality (a selo) in Arsky District, Tatarstan, Russia. The population was 620 as of 2010.

== Geography ==
Khasanshaikh is located 35 kilometres (22 mi) east of Arsk, the district's administrative centre, and 111 kilometres (69 mi) northeast of Kazan, the republic's capital, by road.

== History ==
The earliest known record of the settlement dates from 1678.

From the 17th century to first half of the 19th century, the village's residents belonged to the social estate of state peasants.

The population of Khasanshaikh reached its peak of about 1,765 inhabitants in 1904. By the beginning of the 20th century, the village had three mosques, two madrasas, a watermill, a blacksmith shop, a pottery house, and eight small shops.

Before the creation of the Tatar ASSR in 1920, it was a part of Kazan Uyezd of Kazan Governorate. From 1920, it was part of Arsk Canton; after the creation of districts in the Tatar ASSR (Tatarstan), it was located in Tyuntersky (1930–1963) and Arsky districts (from 1963).

== Notable people ==
Khasanshaikh is a birthplace of Marat Äxmätef, Minister of Agriculture of the Republic of Tatarstan in 1999–2019, Lütsiyä Xäsäneva, an Honored Artist of the Republic of Tatarstan and İlnaz Ğäripef, a singer.
