= Sven Coomer =

Australian modern pentathlete (1940–2025)

Personal information
- Born: 12 October 1940 Sydney, New South Wales, Australia
- Died: 10 March 2025 (aged 84)

Sport
- Sport: Modern pentathlon

Sven Coomer (12 October 1940 – 10 March 2025) was an Australian modern pentathlete who competed at the 1956 Summer Olympics.

Coomer was born in 1940 and raised in Sydney. At the age of 16, he was the youngest competitor at the 1956 Summer Olympics.

Coomer studied product design in Sweden, where he learned to ski and ski-race. He later worked as a ski racing coach, ski instructor and ski school director in the United States. That career led to a job designing ski boots for the Italian firm Nordica, and his designs were widely imitated by other companies. His innovations in ski boot design led to him being dubbed "the father of the modern ski boot". He also founded ZipFit, a company specializing in manufacturing and selling boot liners.

Coomer moved to Aspen, Colorado in 2000, and it was there that he met Mary Dominick, who became his wife. In 2021, he was inducted into the U.S. Ski & Snowboard Hall of Fame. He died on 10 March 2025, at the age of 84.
