= Ketter =

Ketter is a surname. Notable people with the surname include:

- Chris Ketter, Australian politician
- Clay Ketter (born 1961), American painter and photographer
- Kerry Ketter (born 1947), Canadian ice hockey player
- Phil Ketter (1884–1965), American baseball player
- Robert L. Ketter (1929–1989), American engineer

== See also ==
- Katter
- Ketterer
- Kettering, a town
