= Ulriksdal dirt course =

Equestrian course in Stockholm, Sweden

The Ulriksdal dirt course was a course located 6 km north of Stockholm, Sweden at Ulriksdal. It hosted part of the cross-country portion of the eventing competition for the equestrian events at the 1956 Summer Olympics.
