= Ivan Deriuhin =

Soviet modern pentathlete (1928–1996)

Personal information
- Born: 25 November 1928 Zmiiv, Kharkiv, Ukrainian SSR, Soviet Union
- Died: 10 January 1996 (aged 67) Kyiv, Ukraine

Sport
- Sport: Modern pentathlon
Medal record
Men's modern pentathlon
Representing Soviet Union
Olympic Games
Gold medal – first place	1956 Melbourne	Team
World Championships
Gold medal – first place	1961 Moscow	Team
Silver medal – second place	1961 Moscow	Individual

Ivan Konstantinovich Deriuhin (Ukrainian: Іван Костянтинович Дерюгін, Russian: Ива́н Константи́нович Дерю́гин; 25 November 1928 – 10 January 1996) was a Soviet modern pentathlete and Olympic Champion. He competed at the 1956 Summer Olympics in Melbourne, where he won a gold medal in the team competition (together with Aleksandr Tarasov and Igor Novikov, and placed ninth in the individual competition.

Together with Albina Deriugina, he raised the award-winning Soviet gymnast Irina Deriugina.
