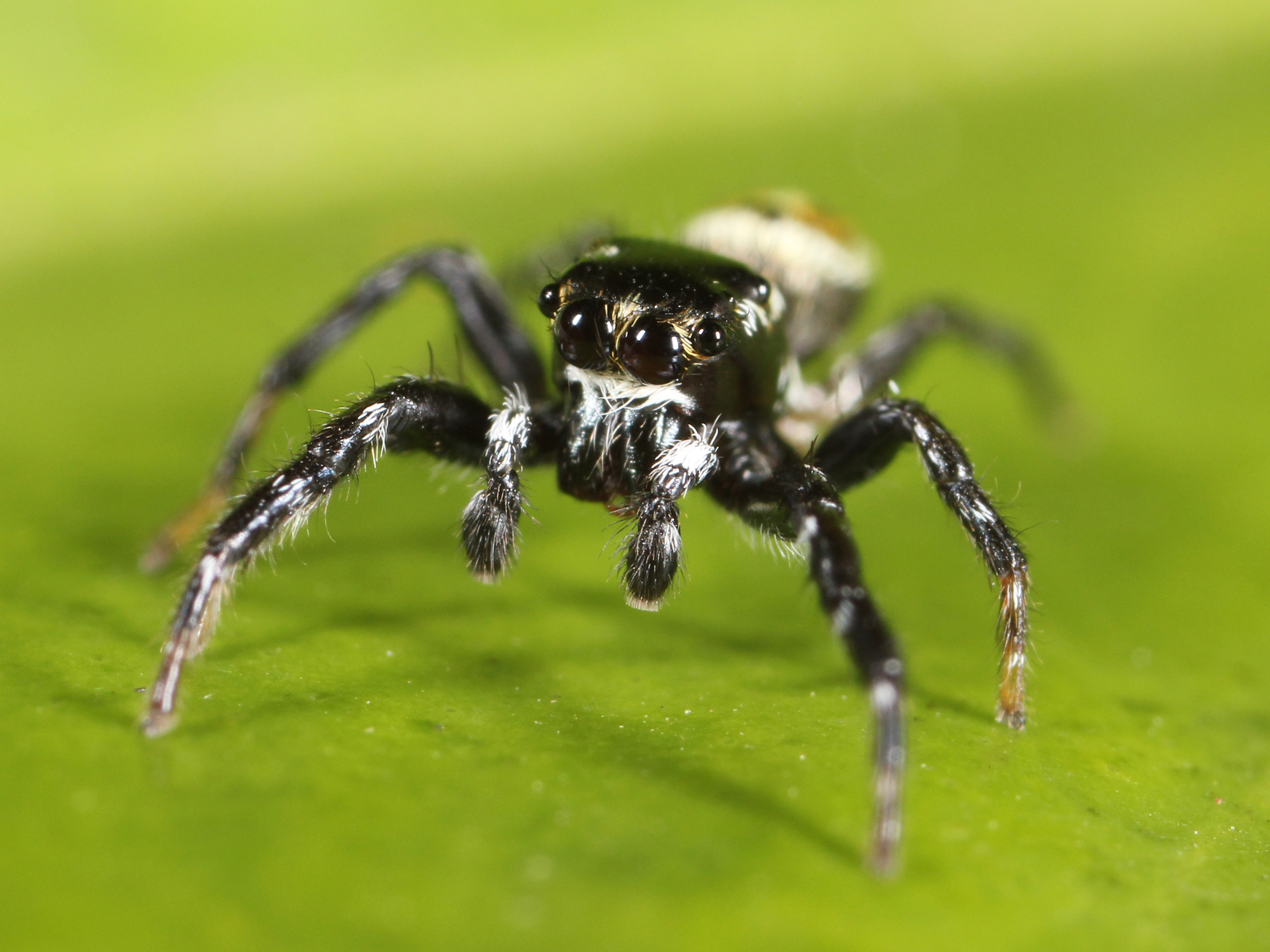
- Adult male Pachomius from Belize

Scientific classification
- Kingdom: Animalia
- Phylum: Arthropoda
- Subphylum: Chelicerata
- Class: Arachnida
- Order: Araneae
- Infraorder: Araneomorphae
- Family: Salticidae
- Subfamily: Salticinae
- Genus: Pachomius; Peckham & Peckham, 1896

Type species
- P. dybowskii (Taczanowski, 1871)

Species
- 20, see text

Synonyms
- Aculeobreda Caporiacco, 1955; Romitia Caporiacco, 1947; Uspachus Galiano, 1995

= Pachomius (spider) =

Genus of spiders

Pachomius is a genus of jumping spiders that was first described by George and Elizabeth Peckham in 1896. Uspachia was merged into genus Romitia in 2007, and all nine species were merged into Pachomius in 2015. The name is derived from Pachomius, the founder of cenobitic monasticism.

== Species ==
As of August 2019 it contains twenty species, found in South America, Panama, Guatemala, Mexico, and on Trinidad:

- Pachomius albipalpis (Taczanowski, 1878) – Peru, Ecuador, Bolivia
- Pachomius andinus (Taczanowski, 1878) – Peru
- Pachomius bahiensis (Galiano, 1995) – Brazil
- Pachomius bilobatus (F. O. Pickard-Cambridge, 1901) – Guatemala, Panama, Venezuela
- Pachomius colombianus (Galiano, 1995) – Panama, Colombia
- Pachomius dybowskii (Taczanowski, 1871) (type) – Mexico to Ecuador, Brazil
- Pachomius flavescens Peckham & Peckham, 1896 – Panama
- Pachomius hadzji (Caporiacco, 1955) – Venezuela
- Pachomius hieroglyphicus (F. O. Pickard-Cambridge, 1901) – Mexico
- Pachomius juquiaensis (Galiano, 1995) – Brazil
- Pachomius lehmanni (Strand, 1908) – Colombia
- Pachomius ministerialis (C. L. Koch, 1846) – Panama, Colombia, Venezuela
- Pachomius misionensis (Galiano, 1995) – Paraguay, Argentina
- Pachomius nigrus (Caporiacco, 1947) – Guyana, French Guiana
- Pachomius niveoguttatus (F. O. Pickard-Cambridge, 1901) – Panama
- Pachomius patellaris (Galiano, 1995) – Bolivia, Brazil
- Pachomius peckhamorum Galiano, 1994 – Panama
- Pachomius sextus Galiano, 1994 – Venezuela, Brazil, French Guiana
- Pachomius similis Peckham & Peckham, 1896 – Trinidad
- Pachomius villeta Galiano, 1994 – Colombia, Venezuela
