= Héctor Carmona =

Chilean modern pentathlete

Personal information
- Born: 29 July 1925 Santiago, Chile
- Died: 29 April 1987 (aged 61)
- Relative: Luis Carmona

Sport
- Sport: Modern pentathlon

Héctor Carmona (29 July 1925 – 29 April 1987) was a Chilean modern pentathlete. He competed at the 1956 Summer Olympics.
