= Boris Pakhomov =

Soviet modern pentathlete

Personal information
- Born: 7 June 1931
- Died: 18 March 2005 (aged 73) Moscow

Sport
- Sport: Modern pentathlon
Medal record
Men's modern pentathlon
Representing Soviet Union
World Championships
| Gold medal – first place | 1961 Moscow | Team |

Boris Pakhomov (7 June 1931 – 18 March 2005) was a Soviet modern pentathlete.
