= Nilo da Silva =

Brazilian modern pentathlete

Personal information
- Born: 24 November 1932 (age 93)

Sport
- Sport: Modern pentathlon

Nilo da Silva (born 24 November 1932) is a Brazilian modern pentathlete. He competed at the 1956 Summer Olympics.
