= Wäinö Korhonen =

Finnish modern pentathlete and épée fencer (1926–2018)

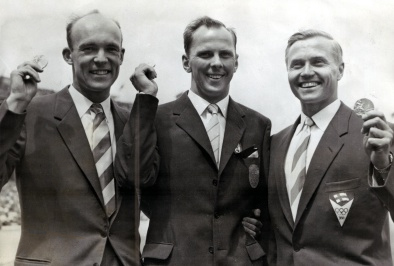
- Korhonen (right) at the 1956 Olympics

Personal information
- Born: 21 December 1926 Jääski, Finland
- Died: 13 December 2018 (aged 91)
- Height: 170 cm (5 ft 7 in)
- Weight: 68 kg (150 lb)

Sport
- Sport: Modern pentathlon, fencing
Medal record
Representing Finland
Olympic Games
Bronze medal – third place	1956 Melbourne	Team
Bronze medal – third place	1956 Melbourne	Individual
World Championships
Silver medal – second place	1957 Stockholm	Team
Silver medal – second place	1959 Hershey	Team
Bronze medal – third place	1958 Aldershot	Team

Wäinö Korhonen (21 December 1926 – 13 December 2018) was a Finnish modern pentathlete and épée fencer who competed at the 1956 Summer Olympics. He won two bronze medals in the individual and team modern pentathlon events. Korhonen won three team medals at the world championships of 1957–1959; his best individual result was fourth place in 1957. Domestically he won the Finnish title in 1954 and 1955, placing second in 1957 and 1962, and third in 1951, 1959, 1961, 1964 and 1967. Korhonen was also a Finnish champion in fencing, swimming and water polo. He was selected as the best Finnish modern pentathlete of the year in 1954, 1957 and 1962. In 2008, he was awarded the Pro Sports Award by the Ministry of Education of Finland.
