= Antal Moldrich =

Hungarian modern pentathlete

Personal information
- Born: 17 January 1934 Budapest, Hungary
- Died: 17 October 2005 (aged 71) Stockholm, Sweden

Sport
- Sport: Modern pentathlon

Antal Moldrich (17 January 1934 – 17 October 2005) was a Hungarian modern pentathlete. He competed at the 1956 Summer Olympics.
