= Melbourne Olympic Arts Festival =

Arts festival held in conjunction with 1956 Olympics in Melbourne

- Opening film: November 1956
- Closing film: December 1956
- Location: Melbourne, Australia
- Language: English

The Melbourne Olympic Arts Festival was an arts festival held in conjunction with the 1956 Summer Olympics held in Melbourne, Australia. Melbourne was the first Olympic Games to have an arts festival as part of the official program.

The Elizabethan Theatre Trust were going to show its presentation of the Douglas Stewart play Ned Kelly as part of the festival. However, reception to this production in Sydney was so poor that it was decided to stage Summer of the Seventeenth Doll instead.

There were a number of exhibits of Australian art and sculpture as well as performances of Australian music.

== Events ==
Events included:

- Music for the People concert produced by Hector Crawford
- The Australian Elizabethan Theatre Trust presented two operas by Mozart, as well as the plays Summer of the Seventeenth Doll and The Tintookies. Guests included Oscar Hammerstein and his Australian wife Dorothy, and Sir Dallas Brooks.

Events not officially part of the festival but held in association with it included:

- the Australian musical Under the Coolibah Tree
- the Olympic Follies
- Thunder Rock by Robert Ardrey, at the Melbourne Little Theatre
