= Modern pentathlon at the 1956 Summer Olympics =

Men's modern pentathlon at the Games of the XVI Olympiad
- Dates: 23–28 November 1956
- Competitors: 40 from 16 nations

Medalists
1st place, gold medalist(s)		Lars Hall	Sweden
2nd place, silver medalist(s)		Olavi Mannonen	Finland
3rd place, bronze medalist(s)		Väinö Korhonen	Finland

At the 1956 Summer Olympics in Melbourne, two events in modern pentathlon were contested.

== Medal summary ==
Event	Gold	Silver	Bronze
Individual	Lars Hall; Sweden	Olavi Mannonen; Finland	Väinö Korhonen; Finland
Team	Soviet Union; Igor Novikov; Ivan Deryugin; Aleksandr Tarasov	United States; William Andre; Jack Daniels; George Lambert	Finland; Olavi Mannonen; Väinö Korhonen; Berndt Katter

== Medal table ==
Rank	Nation	Gold	Silver	Bronze	Total
1	Soviet Union	1	0	0	1
1	Sweden	1	0	0	1
3	Finland	0	1	2	3
4	United States	0	1	0	1
Totals (4 entries)		2	2	2	6

== Participating nations ==
A total of 40 athletes from 16 nations competed at the Melbourne Games:

- Argentina (1)
- Australia (3)
- Brazil (3)
- Chile (3)
- Czechoslovakia (1)
- Finland (3)
- France (1)
- Great Britain (3)
- Hungary (3)
- Italy (1)
- Mexico (3)
- Romania (3)
- South Africa (3)
- Soviet Union (3)
- Sweden (3)
- United States (3)
