= Harry Schmidt (pentathlete) =

South African modern pentathlete

Personal information
- Born: 19 March 1916 Queenstown, Eastern Cape, South Africa
- Died: 13 February 1977 (aged 60) Cape Town, South Africa

Sport
- Sport: Modern pentathlon

Harry Schmidt (19 March 1916 – 13 February 1977) was a South African modern pentathlete. He competed at the 1952 and 1956 Summer Olympics.
