= Dumitru Țintea =

Romanian modern pentathlete

Personal information
- Born: 1936 (age 89–90)

Sport
- Sport: Modern pentathlon

Dumitru Țintea (born 1936) is a Romanian modern pentathlete. He competed at the 1956 Summer Olympics.
