= Thomas Katter =

Finnish composer and musician (1959–2010)

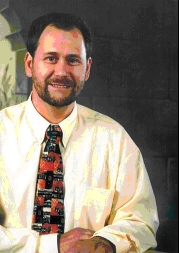
Thomas Katter

Thomas Katter (born 13 December 1959 - dead 9 February 2010) was a professional musician and composer from Finland.

Katter, whose native language is Swedish, is the son of Olympic bronze medalist Berndt Katter.

== Career ==
Katter was a professional guitar teacher, composer and music arranger. Katter has arranged about 25 CDs (as of 2008), and has been actively involved in many Child Song Contests as orchestral conductor during the 1990s.

Katter has also performed as a pianist and a guitar player / singer on several occasions. He has appeared as gig-pianist for the Swedish artist Alf Robertson on many tours, in concert accompanying the Swedish popular singer Thore Skogman as well as Lill Lindfors. He has also played on almost all of the ships traveling between Sweden, Estonia and Finland.

After playing in several bands since 1986, Katter went solo in 2001.

Katter's most successful composition was in the Eurovision Finland Song Contest 1990. He reached second place in the competition with the song "Jag tror på friheten" ( "I believe in freedom"), performed by Susanne Sonntag, and lyrics by Henrik Svahn.

In the same year in MTV3's organized carol competition he reached a special mention with the tune "Santa Claus' Sleighride." MTV3's competition rules determined that both text and lyrics were to be created, but Katter sent only an instrumental composition. The exception was approved, and the melody was recorded in two different versions later published on the "Joululaulu 90" sound disc (MTVLP 026). The composition also became the competition's signature tune. Other artists appearing on this recording were: R. Friman, Anna Hanski, Matti and Teppo, M. Suvas, Matti Esko, Ari Klem, Kake Randelin, Satu Itkonen, R. Helminen, Beat and the Finlanders.

The song "Det finns så många sköna människor" ("There are so many wonderful people") arranged by Katter won the "Tenavatähti" children's song contest in 1991 and was performed by the 10-year-old child star Christopher Romberg. Katter also arranged 11 of the 12 tunes on the competition CD "Stanna hos mig" ("Stay by me"). The other arranger was the late, famous conductor Jaakko Salo. Later, on the "Tenavatähti 1991" cd, the tune was to be found, and won a gold record.

In the 1995 "Syksyn sävel" (Autumn Melody Awards), a composition by Katter and Mika Brushane, with lyrics by Åke Grandell called "Allting ordnar sig" ( "Everything will be all right"), reached fifth place. It was presented by the singer Greger.

Katter has over 90 registered compositions/arrangements in the Finnish Teosto copyright bureau.

Thomas Katter continued performing, arranging music and teaching guitar-playing in southern Finland until his death in 2010.

Katter is represented by Scendraget in Ekenäs, Finland.
