= Salvio Lemos =

Brazilian modern pentathlete (1933–2020)

Personal information
- Full name: Salvio da Costa Lemos
- Born: 25 June 1933
- Died: 20 October 2020 (aged 87) Rio de Janeiro, Brazil

Sport
- Sport: Modern pentathlon

Salvio da Costa Lemos (25 June 1933 – 20 October 2020) was a Brazilian modern pentathlete. He competed at the 1956 Summer Olympics. Lemos died in Rio de Janeiro on 20 October 2020, at the age of 87.
