= Samara State Technical University =

Public university in Samara, Russia

- Самарский государственный технический университет
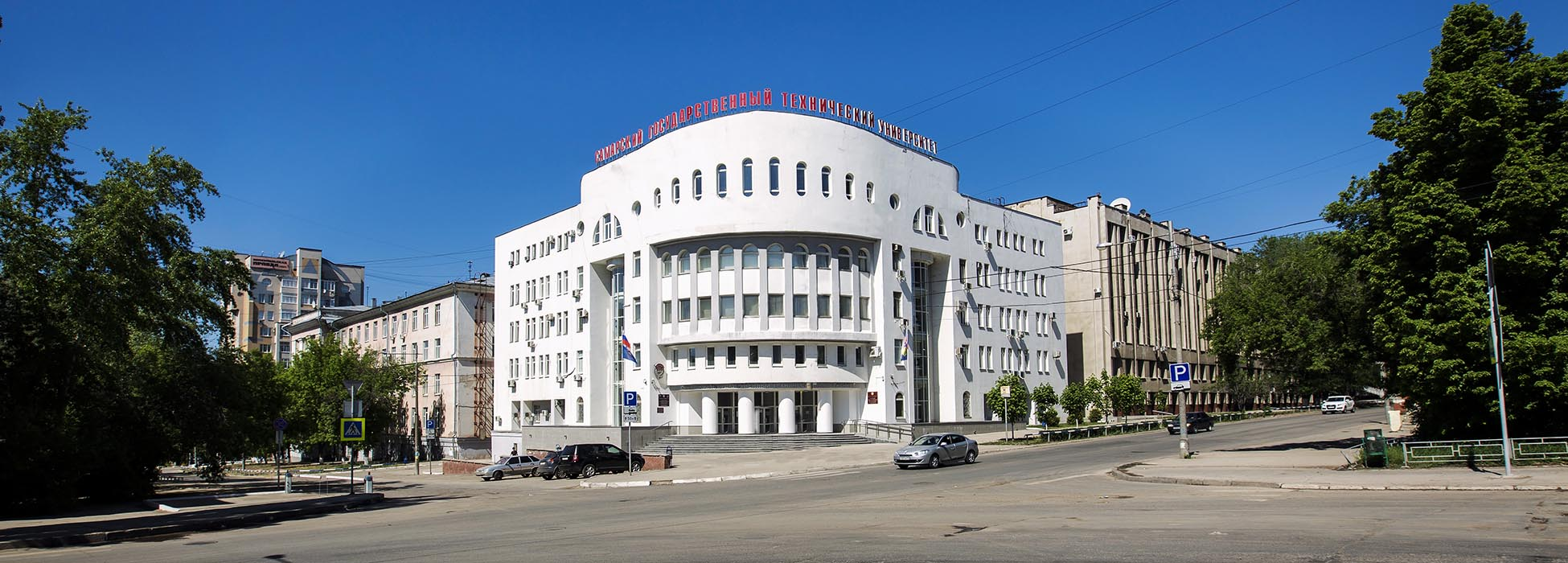
- Main building of Samara Polytech
- Other name: Samara Polytech
- Former name: Kuibyshev Polytechnic Institute
- Motto in English: Education. Science. Technology
- Type: Public
- Established: 1914
- Rector: D. E. Bykov
- Academic staff: 3608
- Students: 18396
- Undergraduates: 18396
- Location: Samara, Russia; 53°12′43″N 50°10′38″E
- Website: samgtu.com
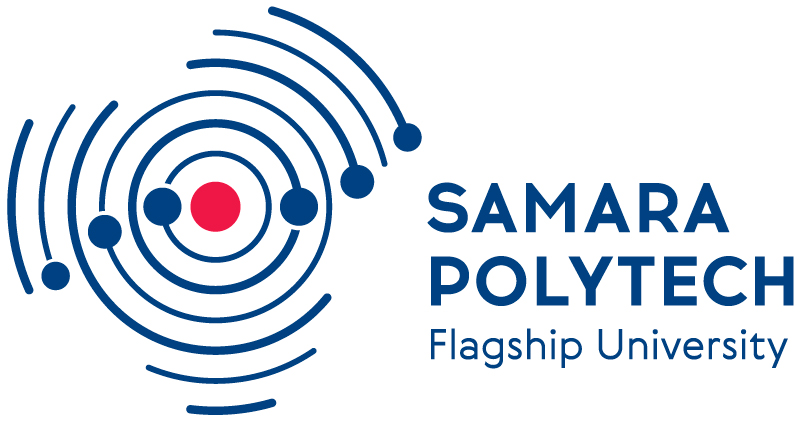

University rankings

Regional – Overall
- QS Emerging Europe and Central Asia: 301-350 (2022)

Samara State Technical University (Russian: Самарский государственный технический университет; also known as Samara Polytech) is a technical university in Samara, Russia.

== Structure ==
- Faculties: Mechanical Engineering Metallurgy and Transport, Petroleum Engineering, Chemical Engineering, Electrical Engineering, Engineering and Technology, Heat Power Engineering, Food Production Technologies, Engineering Economics;
- Institute of Social and Human Sciences and Technologies and Automation and Information Technology Institute;
- Architecture and Civil Engineering Academy which includes: Architectural Engineering Faculty, Design Faculty, Industrial Civil Construction Faculty, Engineering System and Environment Construction Faculty, Construction Technology Faculty;
- 33 research centers including International Research Center for Theoretical Materials Science;
- Scientific and Technical Library;
- United editorial office "Technopolis of the Volga region";
- 10 student clubs: The literary club, Student council, Military-patriotic club "Tayfoon" etc.

== History ==
On July 3, 1914 (old style) Nikolay the II on the yacht "Shtandart" approved the "Law on the establishment of the Polytechnic Institute in the city of Samara". The law was published in the Assembly of Laws and Government Decisions under No. 180. 1934 - Three previously independent technical colleges became a single Mid-Volga industrial institute. In the Middle Volga Industrial Institute joined the Faculty of Chemistry as the Faculty of Chemical Technology.

1935 - The Middle Volga Institute got a new name - Kuibyshev Industrial Institute named after V.V. Kuibyshev

1962 - Kuibyshev Industrial Institute was reorganized into the Kuibyshev Polytechnic Institute.

1980 - according to the Decree of the USSR Supreme Soviet Presidium the Kuibyshev Polytechnic Institute is awarded the Order of the Red Banner of Labor

1991 - Kuibyshev Polytechnic Institute was renamed to Samara Polytechnic Institute and the year later received the status of Samara State Technical University (SSTU)

2015 - The scientific council of SSTU has made a decision to merge with the Samara State University of Architecture and Civil Engineering (SSUACE). The corresponding order was signed by the Minister of Education and Science of the Russian Federation on December 30.

2016 - SSTU has become one of the 11 flagship universities of the country

2017 - The establishing of "Samara Polytech. Flagship University" Brand.

== Notable alumni ==
Viktor Chernomyrdin, Minister of the USSR Gas Industry, Chairman of the Russian Federation Government, Ambassador Extraordinary and Plenipotentiary of Russia in Ukraine

Rem Vyakhirev, Deputy Minister of the USSR Gas Industry, Board Chairman of "Gazprom", laureate of the USSR State Prize, State Prize of the Russian Federation in the field of science

== Rankings ==
- Ranked #146 among 1172 Russian universities (by Webometrics Ranking of World Universities)
- Ranked #54 among 186 Russian universities in 2017 (by ARES Academic Ranking of World Universities-European Standard)
- Ranked #201-210 among Russian Universities in 2019 (by BRICS Rankings)
