= János Bódi =

Hungarian modern pentathlete

Personal information
- Born: 10 July 1932 (age 94) Budapest, Hungary

Sport
- Sport: Modern pentathlon

János Bódi (born 10 July 1932) is a Hungarian modern pentathlete. He competed at the 1956 Summer Olympics.

Later, he moved to Frankfurt am Main, where he worked as a Physical Education teacher at the Lessing-Gymnasium from the 1970s to the 1990s.
