= Okkie van Greunen =

South African modern pentathlete

Personal information
- Born: 28 November 1933 Douglas, Northern Cape, South Africa
- Died: 17 May 1987 (aged 53) Pretoria, South Africa

Sport
- Sport: Modern pentathlon

Okkie van Greunen (28 November 1933 – 17 May 1987) was a South African modern pentathlete. He competed at the 1956 and 1960 Summer Olympics.
