= Oaklands Hunt Club =

Australian fox hunting club

Coordinates: 37°37′49″S 144°51′9″E

- Hunt type: Fox hunting
- Country: Australia

History
- Founded: 1888

Hunt information
- Hound breed: Foxhound
- Hunt country: Victoria
- Master(s): R. C. Cameron-Kennedy & R. Inglesant
- Quarry: Fox
- Kennelled: Greenvale
- Website: oaklandshunt.com.au

The Oaklands Hunt Club is an Australian fox hunting club located in the Greenvale, Victoria.

== History ==
The club was established on 28 July 1888, after its inaugural hunt that day from the Inverness Hotel in Bulla.

The club's pony club was formed in 1956 by club members who wanted to encourage their children and the children of local landowners to ride.

For the modern pentathlon at the 1956 Summer Olympics, the club hosted the riding and cross-country running components.

== See also ==
- Fox hunting
