= Berndt Katter =

Finnish modern pentathlete (1932–2014)

Personal information
- Born: 15 January 1932 Helsinki, Finland
- Died: 20 July 2014 (aged 82) Turku, Finland

Sport
- Sport: Modern pentathlon
Medal record
Men's modern pentathlon
Representing Finland
Olympic Games
Bronze medal – third place	1956 Melbourne	Team
World championships
Silver medal – second place	1959	Team

Berndt Leopold Katter (15 October 1932 – 20 July 2014) was a Finnish former modern pentathlete and Olympic medalist. He thrived at the national level in water-polo (national gold), swimming and fencing.

== Civilian life ==
Besides his sport career, Katter worked in SOK, the Turku Lamp, OPA Ltd, Humppila Glass and Sylvi Salonen Oy's service.

Katter had three children: musician Thomas Katter, Niclas v. Bonsdorff, and Christofer v. Bonsdorff. He was married with textile-artist Riitta Suomi. They lived in Turku.

== Achievements ==
- 1956 Summer Olympics:
  - team competition: bronze, individual competition: 16th.
- 1960 Summer Olympics:
  - team competition: 4th, individual competition: 12th
- World championships
  - 1959: team competition: silver, individual competition: 5th
