= Aleksandr Tarasov (pentathlete) =

Soviet modern pentathlete

Personal information
- Born: 12 March 1927 Moscow, Russian SFSR, Soviet Union
- Died: 16 June 1984 (aged 57)

Sport
- Sport: Modern pentathlon
- Club: Dynamo St. Petersburg
Medal record
Men's modern pentathlon
Representing Soviet Union
Olympic Games
Gold medal – first place	1956 Melbourne	Team

Aleksandr Alekseevich Tarasov (Russian: Александр Алексеевич Тарасов; 23 March 1927 – 16 June 1984) was a Soviet modern pentathlete and Olympic Champion. He competed at the 1956 Summer Olympics in Melbourne, where he won a gold medal in the team competition (together with Ivan Deryugin and Igor Novikov, and placed eighth in the individual competition.

Tarasov was the Soviet champion in 1958. He was part of the Soviet teams that held the world title in 1957, 1958 and 1959; individually, he won silver in 1957 and bronze in 1958 and 1959. After retiring from competitions he worked as a modern pentathlon coach in Saint Petersburg.
