= 1956 Summer Olympics =

Multi-sport event in Melbourne, Australia

Games of the XVI Olympiad
- Emblem of the 1956 Summer Olympics
- Location: Melbourne, Australia; Stockholm, Sweden
- Nations: 72
- Athletes: 3,314 (2,938 men, 376 women)
- Events: 151 in 17 sports (23 disciplines)
- Opening: 22 November 1956 (Note: Equestrian events held in Stockholm, Sweden on 11 to 17 June 1956.)
- Closing: 8 December 1956
- Opened by: Philip, Duke of Edinburgh (Note: The Duke of Edinburgh did not regain the title "Prince" until the following year. See List of titles and honours of Prince Philip, Duke of Edinburgh.)
- Closed by: IOC President Avery Brundage
- Cauldron: Ron Clarke
- Stadium: Stockholm Olympic Stadium (Equestrian Events); Melbourne Cricket Ground (Other Events)

The 1956 Summer Olympics, officially the Games of the XVI Olympiad and officially branded as Melbourne 1956, were an international multi-sport event held in Melbourne, Victoria, Australia, from 22 November to 8 December 1956, with the exception of the equestrian events, which were held in Stockholm, Sweden, in June 1956. The Soviet Union won the most gold and overall medals at these Games.

These Games were the first to be staged in the Southern Hemisphere and Oceania, as well as the first to be held outside Europe and North America. Melbourne is the most southerly city ever to host the Olympics. Due to the Southern Hemisphere's seasons being different from those in the Northern Hemisphere, the 1956 Games did not take place at the usual time of year, because of the need to hold the events during the warmer weather of the host's spring/summer (which corresponds to the Northern Hemisphere's autumn/winter), resulting in the only summer games ever to be held in November and December. Australia hosted the Games for a second time in 2000 in Sydney, New South Wales, and will host them again in 2032 in Brisbane, Queensland.

The Olympic equestrian events could not be held in Melbourne due to Australia's strict quarantine regulations, so they were held in Stockholm five months earlier. This was the second time the Olympics were not held entirely in one country, the first being the 1920 Summer Olympics in Antwerp, Belgium, with some events taking place in Amsterdam, Netherlands. Despite uncertainties and various complications encountered during the preparations, the 1956 Games went ahead in Melbourne as planned and turned out to be a success. Started during the 1956 Games was the "Parade of Athletes" at the closing ceremonies.

Nine teams boycotted the Games for various reasons. Four teams (Egypt, Iraq, Cambodia and Lebanon) boycotted in response to the Suez Crisis, (Note: Cambodia and Egypt competed in the equestrian events, which took place prior to the Crisis, but boycotted the rest of the Games.) in which Egypt was invaded by Israel, France and the United Kingdom. Four teams (the Netherlands, Spain, Liechtenstein and Switzerland) boycotted in response to the Soviet invasion of Hungary, (Note: The Netherlands, Spain and Switzerland competed in the equestrian events, which took place prior to the Hungarian Revolution and its suppression by the Soviet Union, but boycotted the rest of the Games.) and the People's Republic of China's boycott was in response to a dispute with the Republic of China over the right to represent China.

One of the most notable events of the games was a controversial water polo match between the Soviet Union and the defending champions, Hungary. The Soviet Union had recently suppressed an anti-authoritarian revolution in Hungary and violence broke out between the teams during the match, resulting in numerous injuries. When Hungary's Ervin Zádor suffered bleeding after being punched by the Soviet Union's Valentin Prokopov, spectators attempted to join the violence, but they were blocked by police. The match was cancelled, with Hungary being declared the winner because they were in the lead 4–0.

== Host city selection ==
Melbourne was selected as the host city over bids from Buenos Aires, Mexico City, Montreal, Los Angeles, Detroit, Chicago, Minneapolis, Philadelphia, and San Francisco at the 43rd IOC Session in Rome, Italy on 28 April 1949. Mexico City, Montreal and Los Angeles would eventually be selected to host the 1968, 1976 and 1984 Summer Olympics respectively.

1956 Summer Olympics bidding results
City	Country	Round			
City	Country	1	2	3	4
Melbourne	Australia	14	18	19	21
Buenos Aires	Argentina	9	12	13	20
Los Angeles	United States	5	4	5	—
Detroit	United States	2	4	4	—
Mexico City	Mexico	9	3	—	—
Chicago	United States	1	—	—	—
Minneapolis	United States	1	—	—	—
Philadelphia	United States	1	—	—	—
San Francisco	United States	0	—	—	—
Montreal	Canada	0	—	—	—

== Prelude ==
Many members of the IOC were skeptical about Melbourne as an appropriate site. Its location in the Southern Hemisphere was a major concern since the reversal of seasons would mean the Games must be held during the northern winter. The November–December schedule was thought likely to inconvenience athletes from the Northern Hemisphere, who were accustomed to resting during their winter.

Notwithstanding these concerns, the field of candidates eventually narrowed to two Southern Hemisphere cities, these being Melbourne and Buenos Aires, Argentina. Melbourne was selected, in 1949, to host the 1956 Olympics by a one-vote margin. The first sign of trouble was the revelation that Australian equine quarantine would prevent the country from hosting the equestrian events. Stockholm was selected as the alternative site, so equestrian competition began on 10 June, five and a half months before the rest of the Olympic Games were to open.

The above problems of the Melbourne Games were compounded by bickering over financing among Australian politicians. Eventually, in March 1953, the State Government accepted a £2 million loan from the Commonwealth Government to build the Olympic Village, which would accommodate up to 6,000 people, in Heidelberg West. After the Olympics, the houses in the village were handed back to the Housing Commission for general public housing.

At one point, IOC president Avery Brundage suggested that Rome, which was to host the 1960 Games, was so far ahead of Melbourne in preparations that it might be ready as a replacement site in 1956. Constructing of the sporting venues was given priority over the athlete's village. The village was designed as a whole new suburb with semi-detached houses and flats, the first village that both sexes could cohabitate the same buildings instead of gender designated sections.

As late as April 1955, Brundage, who was presiding over the Olympics for the first time, was still doubtful about Melbourne and was not satisfied by an inspection trip to the city. Construction was well under way by then, thanks to a $4.5 million federal loan to Victoria, but it was behind schedule. He still held out the possibility that Rome might have to step in.

By the beginning of 1956, though, it was obvious that Melbourne would be ready for the Olympics.

== Participation and boycotts ==
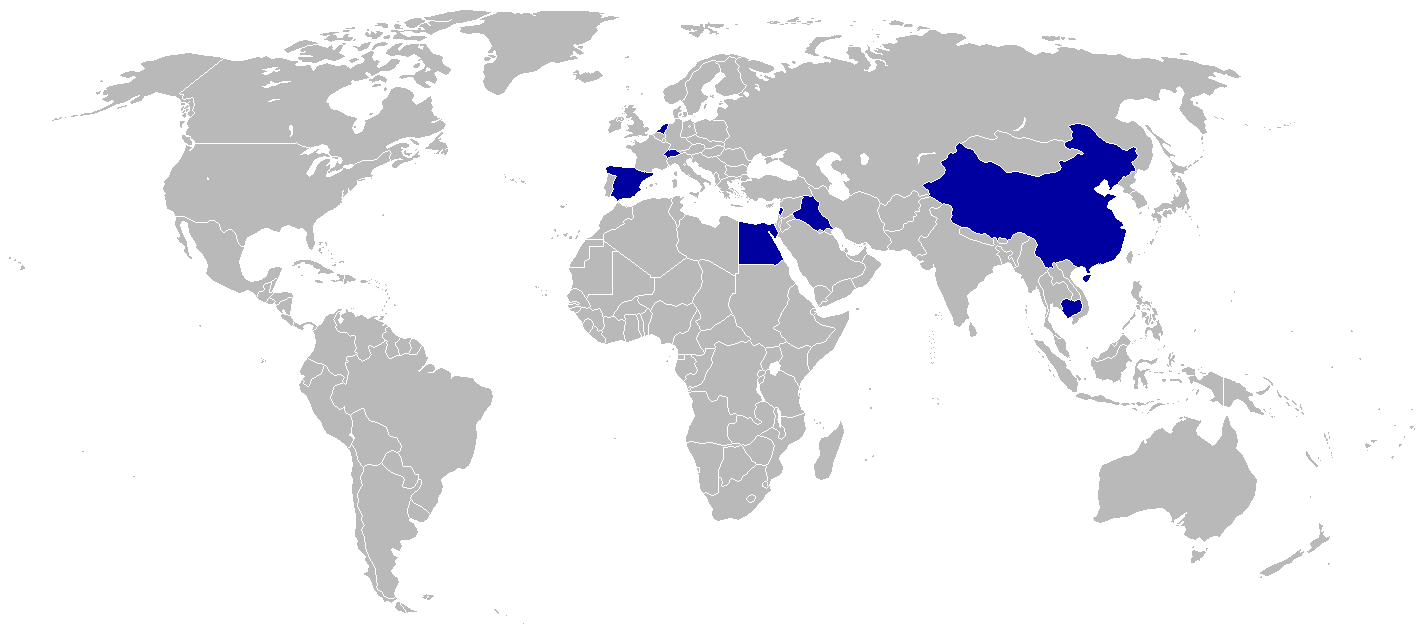
Countries that boycotted the 1956 Games are shaded blue

Egypt, Iraq, Cambodia and Lebanon announced that they would not participate in the Olympics in response to the Suez Crisis when Egypt was invaded by Israel, the United Kingdom, and France.

The Netherlands, Spain, Switzerland and Liechtenstein boycotted the event in protest of the Soviet Union's crushing of the Hungarian Revolution.

The People's Republic of China chose to boycott the event because Taiwan had been allowed to compete.

Athletes from both East and West Germany competed together as a combined team (a display of unity that was repeated in 1960 and 1964, but was then discontinued).

Although the number of countries participating (67) was almost the same as in 1952 (69), the number of athletes competing dropped sharply, from 4,925 to 3,342. (This figure does not include the 158 athletes from 29 countries who took part in the Stockholm equestrian competition.)

== Events ==
Once underway, the Games progressed smoothly, and came to be known as the "Friendly Games". Betty Cuthbert, an 18-year-old from Sydney, won the 100 and 200 metre sprint races and ran an exceptional final leg in the 4 × 100 metre relay to overcome Great Britain's lead and claim her third gold medal, becoming known as the "Golden Girl". The veteran Shirley Strickland repeated her 1952 win in the 80 metre hurdles and was also part of the winning 4 × 100 metre relay team, bringing her career Olympic medal total to seven: three golds, a silver, and three bronze medals.

Australia also triumphed in swimming. They won all of the freestyle races, men's and women's, and collected a total of eight gold, four silver and two bronze medals. Murray Rose became the first male swimmer to win two freestyle events (and a total three events) since Johnny Weissmuller in 1924, while Dawn Fraser won gold medals in the 100 metre freestyle and as the leadoff swimmer in the 4 × 100 metre relay team.

The men's track and field events were dominated by the United States. They not only won 15 of the 24 events, they swept four of them and took first and second place in five others. Bobby Morrow led the way with gold medals in the 100 and 200 metre sprints and the 4 × 100 metre relay. Tom Courtney barely overtook Great Britain's Derek Johnson in the 800 metre run, then collapsed from the exertion and needed medical attention.

Ireland's Ronnie Delany ran an outstanding 53.8 over the last 400 metres to win the 1,500 metre run (also Ireland's last gold medal in track events), in which favourite John Landy of Australia finished third.

There was a major upset, marred briefly by controversy, in the 3,000 metre steeplechase. Little-known Chris Brasher of Great Britain finished well ahead of the field, but the judges disqualified him for interfering with Norway's Ernst Larsen, and they announced Sándor Rozsnyói of Hungary as the winner. Brasher's appeal was supported by Larsen, Rozsnyói, and fourth-place finisher Heinz Laufer of Germany. Subsequently, the decision was reversed and Brasher became the first Briton to win a gold medal in track and field since 1936.

Soviet runner Vladimir Kuts won two golds by winning both the 5,000-metre and 10,000-metre events.

Only two world records were set in track and field. Mildred McDaniel, the first American woman to win gold in the sport, set a high jump record of 1.76 metres (5.8 ft), and Egil Danielsen of Norway overcame blustery conditions with a remarkable javelin throw of 85.71 metres (281.2 ft).

Throughout the Olympics, Hungarian athletes were cheered by fans from Australia and other countries. Many of them gathered in the boxing arena when thirty-year-old Laszlo Papp of Hungary won a record third gold medal by beating José Torres for the light-middleweight championship.

A few days later, the crowd was with the Hungarian water polo team in its hotly contested and emotionally charged match against the Soviet Union which took place against the background of the Soviet invasion of Hungary. The game became rough and, when a Hungarian was forced to leave the pool with a bleeding wound above his eye, a riot almost broke out. The police restored order and the game was called early, with Hungary leading 4–0, and the Hungarians went on to win the gold medal.

In a much publicized Olympic romance, American hammer throw champion Hal Connolly would marry Czechoslovak discus throw champion, Olga Fikotová. After moving to the United States, Olga wanted to continue representing Czechoslovakia, but the Czechoslovak Olympic Committee would not allow her to do so. Thereafter, as Olga Connolly, she took part in every Olympics until 1972 competing for the U.S. She was the flag bearer for the U.S. team at the 1972 Summer Olympics.

The India men's national field hockey team won its sixth consecutive Olympic gold.

Despite the international tensions of 1956—or perhaps because of them—a young Melburnian, John Ian Wing, came up with a new idea for the closing ceremony. Instead of marching as separate teams, behind their national flags, the athletes mingled together as they paraded into and around the arena for a final appearance before the spectators. It was the start of an Olympic tradition that has been followed ever since.

== Olympic torch relay ==
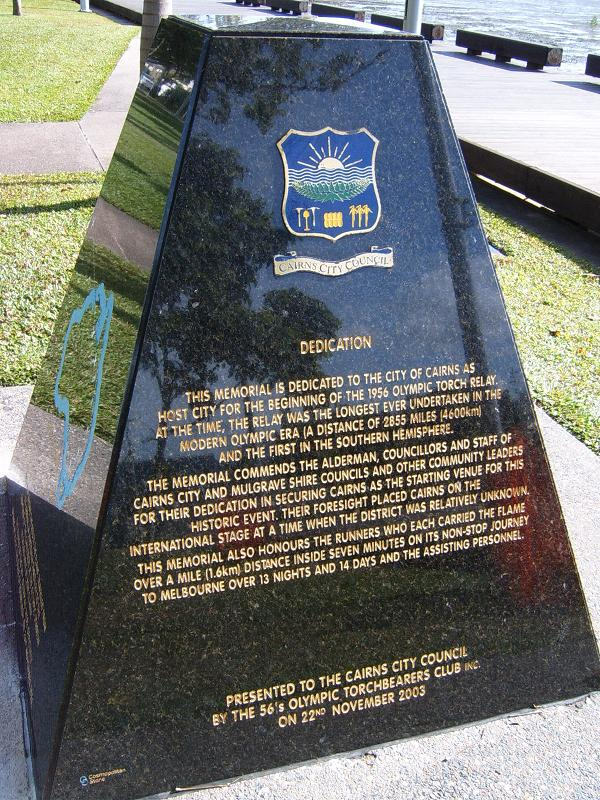
Torch relay monument, Cairns

The Olympic flame was relayed to Melbourne after being lit at Olympia on 2 November 1956.

Greek runners took the flame from Olympia to Athens. The flame was then transferred to a miner's lamp, flown by a Qantas Super Constellation aircraft, "Southern Horizon" to Darwin, Northern Territory.

A Royal Australian Air Force English Electric Canberra jet bomber transported the flame to Cairns, Queensland, where it arrived on 9 November 1956 and the mayor of Cairns, Alderman W.J. Fulton, lit the first torch with the torch design was identical to the one used for the 1948 London Games (except for the engraved city name and year).

The first runner was Con Verevis, a local man of Greek parentage. The flame was relayed down the east coast of Australia using die cast aluminium torches weighing about 3 pounds (1.8 kg).

The flame arrived in Melbourne on 22 November 1956, the day of the opening ceremony and The flame was lit at the Olympic stadium by Ron Clarke, who accidentally burned his arm in the process.

While the Olympic flame was being carried to Sydney, an Australian veterinary student named Barry Larkin carried a fake Olympic Flame and fooled the mayor of Sydney.

== Olympic Arts Festival ==
The Melbourne Olympic Arts Festival was an arts festival held in conjunction with the Olympics.

== Television ==
The Olympics were first televised during the 1936 games to a domestic audience in Berlin. The 1956 Winter Olympics in Cortina d'Ampezzo were broadcast internationally with the organising committee giving the television rights gratis. While there was much interest in the games overseas, no international television or newsreel rights were awarded, as the Melbourne organising committee requested licensing payments for the broadcasting rights. However, domestic rights to the games were hastily agreed by the then three Melbourne stations, GTV9, HSV7 and ABV2, only a week before the opening ceremony. The three Sydney stations, TCN9, ATN7 and ABN2, syndicated the Melbourne coverage. Television in Australia was new, having its beginnings in September 1956. For many Australians, their first glimpse of television were Olympic broadcasts. Around five thousand television sets were in Australia by the time of the Games, so the domestic audience largely watched the games at community halls and at Ampol petrol stations.

== Sports ==
The 1956 Summer Olympics featured 17 different sports encompassing 23 disciplines, and medals were awarded in 151 events (145 events in Melbourne and 6 equestrian events in Stockholm). In the list below, the number of events in each discipline is noted in parentheses.

- Aquatics
  - Diving (4)
  - Swimming (13)
  - Water polo (1)
- Athletics (33)
- Basketball (1)
- Boxing (10)
- Canoeing (9)
- Cycling
  - Road (2)
  - Track (4)
- Equestrian
  - Dressage (2)
  - Eventing (2)
  - Show jumping (2)
- Fencing (7)
- Field hockey (1)
- Association football (1)
- Gymnastics (15)
- Modern pentathlon (2)
- Rowing (7)
- Sailing (5)
- Shooting (7)
- Weightlifting (7)
- Wrestling
  - Freestyle (8)
  - Greco-Roman (8)

=== Demonstration sports ===
- Australian football (1)
- Baseball (1)

== Venues ==
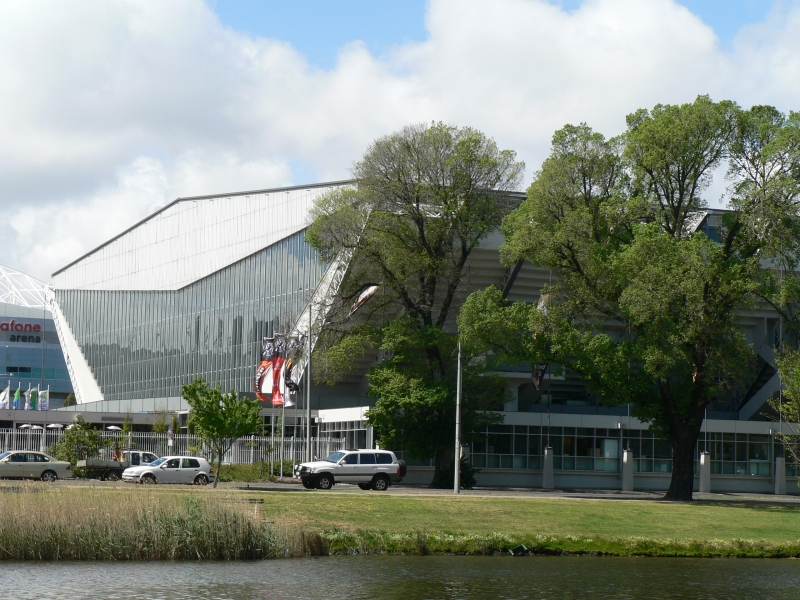
The heritage registered former Olympic Pool (now the Holden Centre), viewed from the Yarra River

Ballarat

- Lake Wendouree – Canoeing, Rowing

Melbourne

- Broadmeadows – Cycling (road)
- Hockey Field – Field hockey
- Melbourne Cricket Ground – Athletics, Field hockey (final), Football (final)
- Oaklands Hunt Club – Modern pentathlon (riding, running)
- Olympic Park Stadium – Football
- Port Phillip Bay – Sailing
- Royal Australian Air Force, Laverton Air Base – Shooting (shotgun)
- Royal Exhibition Building – Basketball (final), Modern pentathlon (fencing), Weightlifting, Wrestling
- St Kilda Town Hall – Fencing
- Swimming/Diving Stadium (Olympic Pool) – Diving, Modern pentathlon (swimming), Swimming, Water polo
- Velodrome – Cycling (track)
- West Melbourne Stadium – Basketball, Boxing, Gymnastics
- Williamstown – Modern pentathlon (shooting), Shooting (pistol, rifle)

Stockholm

- Lill-Jansskogen – Equestrian (eventing)
- Olympic Stadium – Equestrian (dressage, eventing, jumping)
- Ulriksdal – Equestrian (eventing)

== Participating National Olympic Committees ==
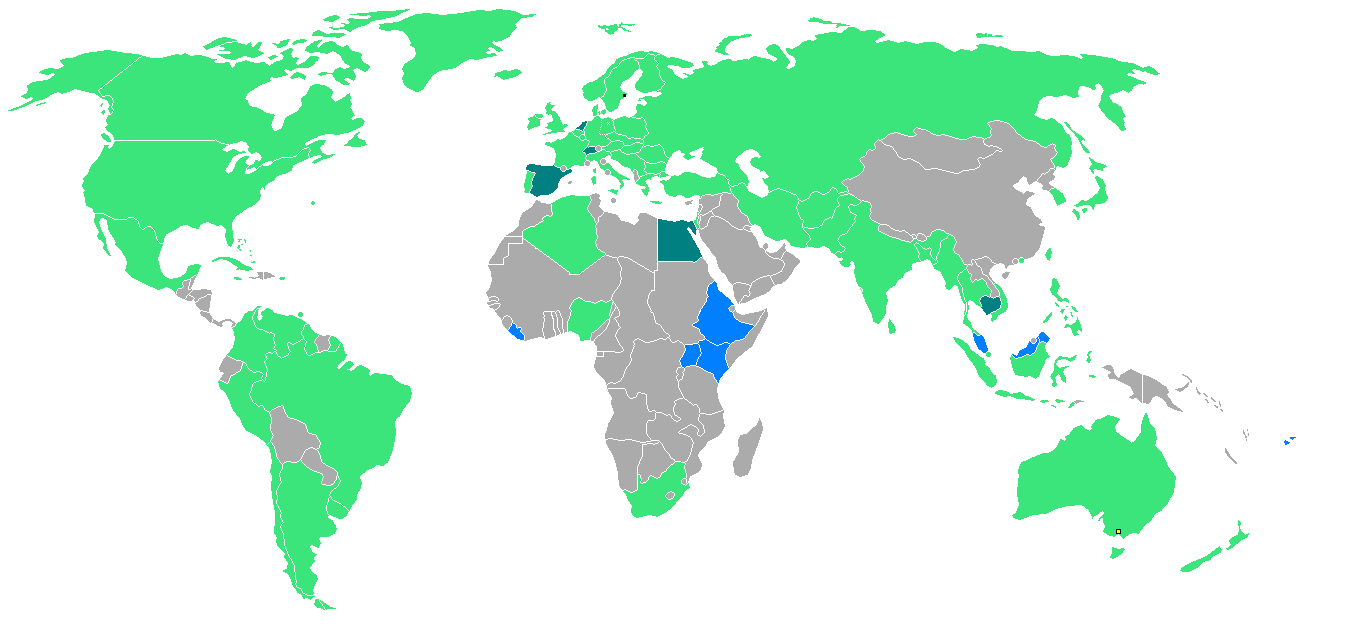
Participating countries, those making their début are shown in blue. Teal shows countries competed in equestrian events but did not participate in Melbourne.

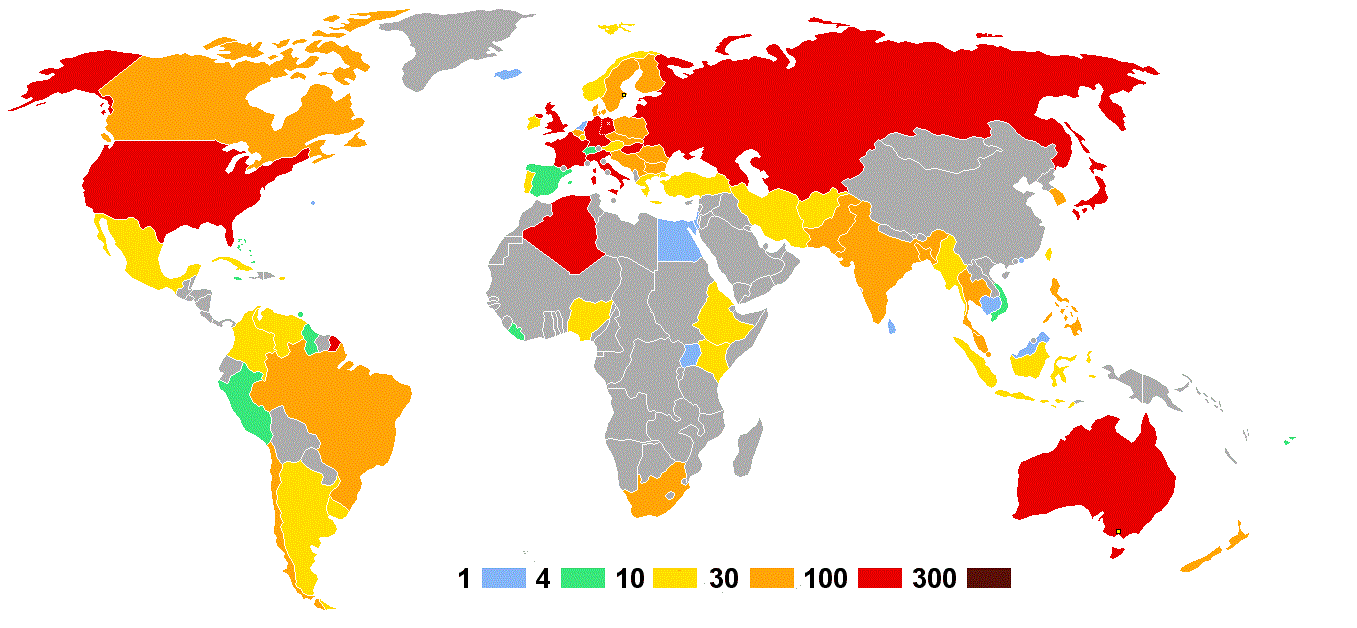
Number of athletes per country

A total of 67 nations competed in the 1956 Olympics. Eight countries made their Olympic debuts: Cambodia (only competed in the equestrian events in Stockholm), Ethiopia, Fiji, Kenya, Liberia, Malaya, North Borneo (modern-day Sabah of Malaysia), and Uganda. Athletes from East Germany and West Germany competed together as the United Team of Germany, an arrangement that would last until 1968.

For the first time, the team of Republic of China effectively represented only Taiwan.

Five nations competed in the equestrian events in Stockholm, but did not attend the Games in Melbourne. Cambodia, Egypt and Lebanon did not compete in Melbourne due to a boycott regarding the Suez Crisis, whilst the Netherlands, Spain and Switzerland all boycotted the Melbourne Olympics in protest at the Soviet invasion of Hungary.

Nations that returned to the games in this edition included Afghanistan and Colombia.

Nations that participated in the previous games in Helsinki 1952 but were absent in Melbourne 1956 included the People's Republic of China, Gold Coast (modern-day Ghana), Guatemala, Liechtenstein, Monaco, Netherlands Antilles, Panama, and Saar. Saar joined West Germany in 1957.

Puerto Rico is an unincorporated territory and commonwealth of the United States. Bahamas, Bermuda, Fiji, Hong Kong, Jamaica, Kenya, Nigeria, Malaya, North Borneo, Singapore, Trinidad and Tobago, Uganda and British Guyana was all part of the British Empire.

Participating National Olympic Committees
- Afghanistan (12 athletes)
- Argentina (28)
- Australia (294) (host)
- Austria (29)
- Bahamas (4)
- Belgium (51)
- Bermuda (3)
- Brazil (44)
- Bulgaria (43)
- Burma (11)
- Canada (92)
- Ceylon (3)
- Chile (33)
- Colombia (26)
- Cuba (16)
- Czechoslovakia (63)
- Denmark (31)
- Ethiopia (12)
- Fiji (5)
- Finland (71)
- France (137)
- United Team of Germany (158)
- Great Britain (189)
- Greece (13)
- Guyana (4)
- Hong Kong (2)
- Hungary (108)
- Iceland (2)
- India (59)
- Indonesia (22)
- Iran (17)
- Ireland (18)
- Israel (3)
- Italy (129)
- Jamaica (6)
- Japan (110)
- Kenya (25)
- Liberia (4)
- Luxembourg (11)
- Malaya (32)
- Mexico (24)
- New Zealand (53)
- Nigeria (10)
- North Borneo (2)
- Norway (22)
- Pakistan (55)
- Peru (8)
- Philippines (39)
- Poland (64)
- Portugal (11)
- Puerto Rico (10)
- Romania (44)
- Singapore (52)
- South Africa (50)
- South Korea (35)
- Soviet Union (272)
- Sweden (88)
- Republic of China (13)
- Thailand (38)
- Trinidad and Tobago (6)
- Turkey (19)
- Uganda (3)
- United States (297)
- Uruguay (21)
- Venezuela (19)
- Vietnam (6)
- Yugoslavia (35)
NOCs that participated in the equestrian events in Stockholm, but did not attend the Games in Melbourne:
- Cambodia (2)
- Egypt (3)
- Netherlands (1)
- Spain (6)
- Switzerland (9)

=== Number of athletes by National Olympic Committees ===
IOC Letter Code	Country	Athletes
AFG	Afghanistan	12
ARG	Argentina	28
AUS	Australia	294
AUT	Austria	29
BAH	Bahamas	4
BEL	Belgium	54
BER	Bermuda	3
BRA	Brazil	44
BUL	Bulgaria	43
BIR	Burma	11
CAM	Cambodia	2
CAN	Canada	92
CEY	Ceylon	3
CHI	Chile	33
COL	Colombia	26
CUB	Cuba	16
TCH	Czechoslovakia	63
DEN	Denmark	31
EGY	Egypt	3
ETH	Ethiopia	12
FIJ	Fiji	4
FIN	Finland	64
FRA	France	137
EUA	United Team of Germany	158
GRB	Great Britain	189
GRE	Greece	13
GUY	Guyana	4
HKG	Hong Kong	2
HUN	Hungary	108
ISL	Iceland	2
IND	India	59
INA	Indonesia	30
IRN	Iran	17
IRL	Ireland	12
ISR	Israel	3
ITA	Italy	129
JAM	Jamaica	10
JPN	Japan	110
KEN	Kenya	25
LBR	Liberia	4
LUX	Luxembourg	11
MAL	Malaya	32
MEX	Mexico	24
NED	Netherlands	1
NZL	New Zealand	53
NGR	Nigeria	10
NBO	North Borneo	2
NOR	Norway	22
PAK	Pakistan	55
PER	Peru	8
PHI	Philippines	39
POL	Poland	64
POR	Portugal	11
PUR	Puerto Rico	10
ROM	Romania	44
SIN	Singapore	52
ZAF	South Africa	50
KOR	South Korea	35
URS	Soviet Union	272
SPA	Spain	6
SWE	Sweden	88
SUI	Switzerland	9
RCF	Republic of China	21
THA	Thailand	35
TRI	Trinidad and Tobago	6
TUR	Turkey	19
UGA	Uganda	3
USA	United States	297
URU	Uruguay	21
VEN	Venezuela	22
VNM	Vietnam	6
JUG	Yugoslavia	35
Total		3,325

== Medal count ==
These are the top ten nations that won medals at the 1956 Games.

Rank	Nation	Gold	Silver	Bronze	Total
1	Soviet Union	37	29	32	98
2	United States	32	25	17	74
3	Australia*	13	8	14	35
4	Hungary	9	10	7	26
5	Italy	8	8	9	25
6	Sweden	8	5	6	19
7	United Team of Germany	6	13	7	26
8	Great Britain	6	7	11	24
9	Romania	5	3	5	13
10	Japan	4	10	5	19
Totals (10 entries)		128	118	113	359

Key

* Host nation (Australia). John Ian Wing of Australia was also presented with a bronze medal, not included in the above table, for suggesting the closing ceremony have athletes as one nation.

== See also ==
- 1956 Winter Olympics
- Olympic Games held in Australia
  - 1956 Summer Olympics – Melbourne
  - 2000 Summer Olympics – Sydney
  - 2032 Summer Olympics – Brisbane
- List of IOC country codes
- 2005 Summer Deaflympics
- 2006 Commonwealth Games

== Notes ==
Summer Olympics
Preceded by Helsinki	XVI Olympiad; Melbourne/Stockholm; 1956	Succeeded by Rome
