= 1962 European Athletics Championships – Men's javelin throw =

Men's javelin throw at the European Athletics Championships

The men's javelin throw at the 1962 European Athletics Championships was held in Belgrade, then Yugoslavia, at JNA Stadium on 14 and 15 September 1962.

== Medalists ==
Gold	Jānis Lūsis; Soviet Union
Silver	Viktor Tsybulenko; Soviet Union
Bronze	Władysław Nikiciuk; Poland

== Results ==
=== Final ===
15 September

Rank	Name	Nationality	Result	Notes
1st place, gold medalist(s)	Jānis Lūsis	Soviet Union	82.04	CR
2nd place, silver medalist(s)	Viktor Tsybulenko	Soviet Union	77.92	
3rd place, bronze medalist(s)	Władysław Nikiciuk	Poland	77.66	
4	Marian Machowina	Poland	77.15	
5	Gergely Kulcsár	Hungary	76.89	
6	Carlo Lievore	Italy	76.25	
7	Janusz Sidło	Poland	75.01	
8	Rolf Herings	West Germany	74.95	
9	Willy Rasmussen	Norway	74.25	
10	Väinö Kuisma	Finland	73.32	
11	Petar Galić	Yugoslavia	73.30	
12	Hermann Salomon	West Germany	72.93	

=== Qualification ===
14 September

Rank	Name	Nationality	Result	Notes
1	Carlo Lievore	Italy	80.20	CR Q
2	Jānis Lūsis	Soviet Union	79.06	Q
3	Viktor Tsybulenko	Soviet Union	78.92	Q
4	Marian Machowina	Poland	77.60	Q
5	Willy Rasmussen	Norway	76.80	Q
6	Gergely Kulcsár	Hungary	74.90	Q
7	Janusz Sidło	Poland	74.77	Q
8	Hermann Salomon	West Germany	73.47	Q
9	Rolf Herings	West Germany	73.34	Q
10	Väinö Kuisma	Finland	73.25	Q
11	Władysław Nikiciuk	Poland	72.90	Q
12	Petar Galić	Yugoslavia	72.80	Q
13	Božidar Miletić	Yugoslavia	72.75	
14	Horst Bade	East Germany	72.69	
15	Pauli Nevala	Finland	72.15	
16	Franco Radman	Italy	71.55	
17	Leon Syrowatsky	France	71.01	
18	Alexandru Bizim	Romania	70.42	
19	Vladimir Kuznetsov	Soviet Union	69.78	
20	Michel Macquet	France	69.22	
21	Urs von Wartburg	Switzerland	68.71	
22	Christos Pierrakos	Greece	67.80	
23	Gheorghe Popescu	Romania	65.05	
24	John McSorley	Great Britain	64.50	
25	Colin Smith	Great Britain	63.85	

== Participation ==
According to an unofficial count, 25 athletes from 14 countries participated in the event.

- East Germany (1)
- Finland (2)
- France (2)
- Greece (1)
- Hungary (1)
- Italy (2)
- Norway (1)
- Poland (3)
- Romania (2)
- Soviet Union (3)
- Switzerland (1)
- Great Britain (2)
- West Germany (2)
- Yugoslavia (2)
