= 1966 European Athletics Championships – Men's javelin throw =

Men's javelin throw at the European Athletics Championships

The men's javelin throw at the 1966 European Athletics Championships was held in Budapest, Hungary, at Népstadion on 1 and 2 September 1966.

== Medalists ==
Gold	Jānis Lūsis; Soviet Union
Silver	Władysław Nikiciuk; Poland
Bronze	Gergely Kulcsár; Hungary

== Results ==
=== Final ===
2 September

Rank	Name	Nationality	Result	Notes
1st place, gold medalist(s)	Jānis Lūsis	Soviet Union	84.48	CR
2nd place, silver medalist(s)	Władysław Nikiciuk	Poland	81.76	
3rd place, bronze medalist(s)	Gergely Kulcsár	Hungary	80.54	
4	Pauli Nevala	Finland	80.36	
5	Miklós Németh	Hungary	79.82	
6	Väinö Kuisma	Finland	79.26	
7	Janusz Sidło	Poland	78.86	
8	Manfred Stolle	East Germany	78.70	
9	Karlo Gordzemashvili	Soviet Union	75.68	
10	Miloš Vojtek	Czechoslovakia	72.52	
11	Urs von Wartburg	Switzerland	72.06	
12	Jorma Kinnunen	Finland	70.48	

=== Qualification ===
1 September

Rank	Name	Nationality	Result	Notes
1	Władysław Nikiciuk	Poland	81.36	Q
2	Pauli Nevala	Finland	80.48	Q
3	Janusz Sidło	Poland	80.16	Q
4	Urs von Wartburg	Switzerland	79.14	Q
5	Miklós Németh	Hungary	78.34	Q
6	Karlo Gordzemashvili	Soviet Union	78.30	Q
7	Gergely Kulcsár	Hungary	77.64	Q
8	Jānis Lūsis	Soviet Union	77.00	Q
9	Jorma Kinnunen	Finland	76.60	Q
10	Väinö Kuisma	Finland	76.60	Q
11	Manfred Stolle	East Germany	75.50	Q
12	Miloš Vojtek	Czechoslovakia	74.88	Q
13	Mart Paama	Soviet Union	74.54	
14	Terje Thorslund	Norway	74.20	
15	Petelo Wakalina	France	74.12	
16	Hermann Salomon	West Germany	73.24	
17	Josef Dušátko	Czechoslovakia	73.18	
18	Harry Abraham	West Germany	70.94	
19	Eugen Stumpp	West Germany	70.90	
20	Michel Pougheon	France	69.28	
21	Gábor Kovács	Hungary	69.14	
22	John FitzSimons	Great Britain	68.86	
	Willy Rasmussen	Norway	NM	

== Participation ==
According to an unofficial count, 23 athletes from 11 countries participated in the event.

- Czechoslovakia (2)
- East Germany (1)
- Finland (3)
- France (2)
- Hungary (3)
- Norway (2)
- Poland (2)
- Switzerland (1)
- Soviet Union (3)
- Great Britain (1)
- West Germany (3)
