= Athletics at the 1968 Summer Olympics – Men's javelin throw =

Men's javelin throw at the Games of the XIX Olympiad
- Venue: Estadio Olímpico Universitario
- Dates: October 15, 1968 (qualifications); October 16, 1968 (final)
- Competitors: 29 from 20 nations

Medalists
1st place, gold medalist(s)		Jānis Lūsis; Soviet Union
2nd place, silver medalist(s)		Jorma Kinnunen; Finland
3rd place, bronze medalist(s)		Gergely Kulcsár; Hungary

The Men's Javelin Throw event at the 1968 Summer Olympics took place on October 15–16 at the Estadio Olímpico Universitario. The qualifying standard was 80 m (262 ft 5 1/2 in).

== Records ==
Prior to this competition, the existing world and Olympic records were as follows:

World record	(Soviet Union) Jānis Lūsis	91.98 m	Saarijärvi, Finland	June 23, 1968
Olympic record	Egil Danielsen (NOR)	85.71 m	Melbourne, Australia	November 26, 1956

== Results ==
=== Qualifying round ===
Rank	Series	Athlete	Nationality	#1	#2	#3	Result	Notes
1	A	Karl-Åke Nilsson	Sweden	x	x	84.74	84.74	Q
2	A	Jānis Lūsis	Soviet Union	83.68			83.68	Q
3	A	Jorma Kinnunen	Finland	x	74.16	83.16	83.16	Q
4	B	Walter Pektor	Austria	82.16			82.16	Q
5	A	Manfred Stolle	East Germany	81.88			81.88	Q
6	A	Gergely Kulcsár	Hungary	81.56			81.56	Q
7	A	Mark Murro	United States	74.14	81.14		81.14	Q
8	A	Władysław Nikiciuk	Poland	74.16	78.22	81.00	81.00	Q
9	A	Urs von Wartburg	Switzerland	76.58	80.66		80.66	Q
10	A	Janusz Sidlo	Poland	74.90	80.12		80.12	Q
11	B	Aurelio Janet	Cuba	80.10			80.10	Q
12	A	Hermann Salomon	West Germany	79.48	x	76.50	79.48	q
13	A	Rolf Herings	West Germany	79.08	77.00	78.70	79.08	
14	A	Pauli Nevala	Finland	x	77.90	x	77.90	
15	A	Mart Paama	Soviet Union	74.18	77.26	74.64	77.26	
16	B	Klaus Wolfermann	West Germany	75.78	71.40	75.02	75.78	
17	B	Miklós Németh	Hungary	74.56	74.82	75.50	75.50	
18	B	Dave Travis	Great Britain	74.24	74.36	70.84	74.36	
19	B	Lode Wyns	Belgium	73.68	x	x	73.68	
20	B	Gary Stenlund	United States	73.52	68.88	71.44	73.52	
21	A	Frank Covelli	United States	70.30	x	73.04	73.04	
22	B	William Heikkila	Canada	70.10	71.20	70.78	71.20	
23	B	Nashatar Singh Sidhu	Malaysia	x	63.58	70.70	70.70	
24	B	Rolf Hoppe	Chile	68.32	65.82	65.86	68.32	
25	B	Viliame Liga	Fiji	x	61.62	62.32	62.32	
26	B	Donald Velez	Nicaragua	48.92	x	61.32	61.32	
27	B	Rolf Bühler	Switzerland	61.06	x	x	61.06	
	B	Lahcen Samsam Akka	Morocco				DNS	
	B	Christos Pierrakos	Greece				DNS	

=== Finals ===
The eight highest-ranked competitors after three rounds qualified for the final three throws to decide the medals.

Rank	Athlete	Nationality	1	2	3	4	5	6	Result
1st place, gold medalist(s)	Jānis Lūsis	Soviet Union	81.74	86.34	82.66	84.40	x	90.10	90.10 OR
2nd place, silver medalist(s)	Jorma Kinnunen	Finland	86.30	x	x	79.00	85.82	88.58	88.58
3rd place, bronze medalist(s)	Gergely Kulcsár	Hungary	83.10	x	83.82	87.06	85.14	83.40	87.06
4	Władysław Nikiciuk	Poland	x	85.70	82.24	x	82.32	80.44	85.70
5	Manfred Stolle	East Germany	x	76.86	81.52	84.42	x	79.72	84.42
6	Karl-Ake Nilsson	Sweden	83.48	x	x	x	76.74	79.76	83.48
7	Janusz Sidło	Poland	80.00	76.36	80.58	75.50	77.86	76.46	80.58
8	Urs von Wartburg	Switzerland	80.56	77.06	77.22	x	x	x	80.56
9	Mark Murro	United States	80.06	80.08	x				80.08
10	Walter Pektor	Austria	75.64	77.40	x				77.40
11	Aurelio Janet	Cuba	x	74.88	x				74.88
12	Hermann Salomon	West Germany	x	71.64	73.50				73.50
