= Athletics at the 1960 Summer Olympics – Men's javelin throw =

Men's javelin throw at the Games of the XVII Olympiad
- Venue: Stadio Olimpico
- Dates: September 7 (qualifications); September 8 (final)
- Competitors: 28 from 16 nations
- Winning distance: 84.64

Medalists
1st place, gold medalist(s)		Viktor Tsybulenko; Soviet Union
2nd place, silver medalist(s)		Walter Krüger; United Team of Germany
3rd place, bronze medalist(s)		Gergely Kulcsár; Hungary

The Men's Javelin Throw event at the 1960 Summer Olympics took place on September 7–8 at the Stadio Olimpico. The qualifying standard was 60 m (196 ft 10 in).

== Records ==
Prior to this competition, the existing world and Olympic records were as follows:

World record	(United States) Al Cantello	86.04 m	Compton, United States	June 5, 1959
Olympic record	Egil Danielsen (NOR)	85.71 m	Melbourne, Australia	November 26, 1956

== Results ==
=== Qualifying round ===
Series	Athlete	Nationality	#1	#2	#3	Result	Notes
1	Egil Danielsen	Norway	69.26	72.66	72.93	72.93	
1	Terje Pedersen	Norway	74.67			74.67	Q
1	Willy Rasmussen	Norway	73.80	77.95		77.95	Q
1	Janusz Sidło	Poland	85.14			85.14	Q
1	Zbigniew Radziwonowicz	Poland	74.86			74.86	Q
1	Walter Krüger	United Team of Germany	63.93	78.81		78.81	Q
1	Erich Ahrendt	United Team of Germany	72.99	73.29	71.60	73.29	
2	Hermann Salomon	United Team of Germany	69.57	75.12		75.12	Q
1	Myron Anyfantakis	Greece	59.40	69.53	x	69.53	
1	Knut Fredriksson	Sweden	67.21	75.28		75.28	Q
1	Abdul Wardak	Afghanistan	53.64	54.20	x	54.20	
1	Alexandru Bizim	Romania	68.92	67.10	57.90	68.92	
1	Alfonso de Andrés	Spain	59.84	60.84	54.70	60.84	
1	William Alley	United States	62.02	67.36	68.66	68.66	
2	Terence Beucher	United States	x	61.59	68.11	68.11	
2	Al Cantello	United States	x	69.69	79.72	79.72	Q
1	Viktor Tsybulenko	Soviet Union	67.50	79.70		79.70	Q
2	Mart Paama	Soviet Union	68.69	76.36		76.36	Q
2	Ivan Sivoplyasov	Soviet Union	65.65	73.85	71.93	73.85	
2	Väinö Kuisma	Finland	75.93			75.93	Q
2	Muhammad Nawaz	Pakistan	x	70.05	67.40	70.05	
2	Salah Majid	Iraq	57.52	54.18	52.25	57.52	
2	Gergely Kulcsár	Hungary	74.40			74.40	Q
2	Urs von Wartburg	Switzerland	71.56	x	68.92	71.56	
2	Léon Syrovatski	France	67.81	71.59	71.54	71.59	
2	Michel Macquet	France	73.74	x	69.15	73.74	
2	Baruch Feinberg	Israel	68.24	62.81	65.94	68.24	
2	Carlo Lievore	Italy	74.82			74.82	Q

=== Finals ===
The six highest-ranked competitors after three rounds qualified for the final three throws to decide the medals.

Rank	Athlete	Nationality	1	2	3	4	5	6	Result
1st place, gold medalist(s)	Viktor Tsybulenko	Soviet Union	84.64	76.59	76.46	x	67.73	x	84.64
2nd place, silver medalist(s)	Walter Krüger	United Team of Germany	79.36	66.51	71.29	75.23	72.62	x	79.36
3rd place, bronze medalist(s)	Gergely Kulcsár	Hungary	78.57	77.60	68.56	73.20	x	x	78.57
4	Väinö Kuisma	Finland	78.40	74.04	74.45	67.75	76.38	74.69	78.40
5	Willy Rasmussen	Norway	x	67.62	78.36	x	x	69.55	78.36
6	Knut Fredriksson	Sweden	69.70	78.33	64.29	72.53	78.01	68.51	78.33
7	Zbigniew Radziwonowicz	Poland	73.58	77.31	74.47				77.31
8	Janusz Sidło	Poland	76.46	76.43	71.93				76.46
9	Carlo Lievore	Italy	64.43	72.47	75.21				75.21
10	Al Cantello	United States	74.70	71.00	71.10				74.70
11	Mart Paama	Soviet Union	74.56	72.59	70.43				74.56
12	Hermann Salomon	United Team of Germany	74.11	x	72.95				74.11
13	Terje Pedersen	Norway	x	x	x				NM
