= Athletics at the 1964 Summer Olympics – Men's javelin throw =

Men's javelin throw at the Games of the XVIII Olympiad
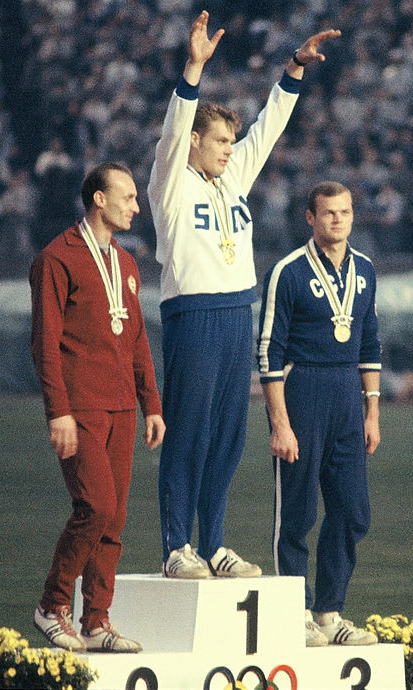
- Men's javelin throw at the 1964 Olympics on a stamp of Japan
- Venue: Olympic Stadium
- Dates: 14 October 1964
- Competitors: 27 from 17 nations
- Winning distance: 82.66

Medalists
1st place, gold medalist(s)		Pauli Nevala; Finland
2nd place, silver medalist(s)		Gergely Kulcsár; Hungary
3rd place, bronze medalist(s)		Jānis Lūsis; Soviet Union

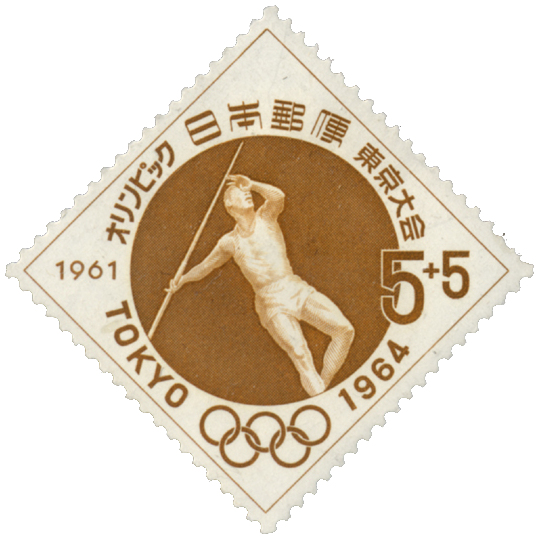
1964 Olympics javelin stamp of Japan.

The men's javelin throw was one of four men's throwing events on the Athletics at the 1964 Summer Olympics program in Tokyo. It was held on 14 October 1964. 27 athletes from 17 nations entered, with 2 not starting in the qualification round.

== Results ==
=== Qualification ===
The qualification standard was 77.00 metres. Each thrower had three attempts to reach that standard. Since only one thrower made the mark the next eleven farthest-throwing athletes also advanced to meet the minimum 12 in the final.

Place	Athlete	Nation	Best mark	Throw 1	Throw 2	Throw 3
1	Urs von Wartburg	Switzerland	79.92 metres	74.55	79.92	—
2	Janusz Sidlo	Poland	76.93 metres	75.33	74.45	76.93
3	Jorma Kinnunen	Finland	75.52 metres	68.13	73.20	75.52
4	Vladimir Kuznetsov	Soviet Union	75.01 metres	X	68.98	75.01
5	Gergely Kulcsár	Hungary	74.32 metres	74.32	72.62	X
6	Pauli Nevala	Finland	74.19 metres	71.49	72.72	74.19
7	Jānis Lūsis	Soviet Union	73.48 metres	72.79	X	73.48
8	Władysław Nikiciuk	Poland	73.45 metres	73.45	67.56	71.17
9	Christos Pierrakos	Greece	72.91 metres	X	72.91	68.98
10	Hans Schenk	United Team of Germany	72.55 metres	72.55	66.97	X
11	Rolf Herings	United Team of Germany	72.47 metres	72.47	68.02	71.74
12	Ed Red	United States	72.31 metres	X	72.31	66.24
13	Terje Pedersen	Norway	72.10 metres	61.39	66.78	72.10
14	Hermann Salomon	United Team of Germany	71.92 metres	67.82	69.84	71.92
15	Carlo Lievore	Italy	70.88 metres	70.71	68.04	70.88
16	Les Tipton	United States	70.74 metres	65.95	70.74	70.03
17	Viktor Aksonov	Soviet Union	69.46 metres	68.30	X	69.46
18	Michel Macquet	France	69.35 metres	63.34	65.36	69.35
19	Takashi Miki	Japan	68.70 metres	68.70	63.56	62.80
20	Willy Rasmussen	Norway	68.43 metres	68.43	67.37	63.88
21	Frank Covelli	United States	68.08 metres	X	68.08	X
22	Hideta Kanai	Japan	65.85 metres	63.40	X	65.85
23	Park Su-gwon	South Korea	62.50 metres	58.51	X	62.50
24	Patricio Etcheverry	Chile	60.77 metres	59.35	60.77	54.19
25	Nashatar Singh Sidhu	Malaysia	51.63 metres	45.49	51.63	49.49
—	Lennart Hedmark	Sweden	Did not start	-		
—	Yang Chuan-kwang	Taiwan	Did not start	-		

=== Final ===
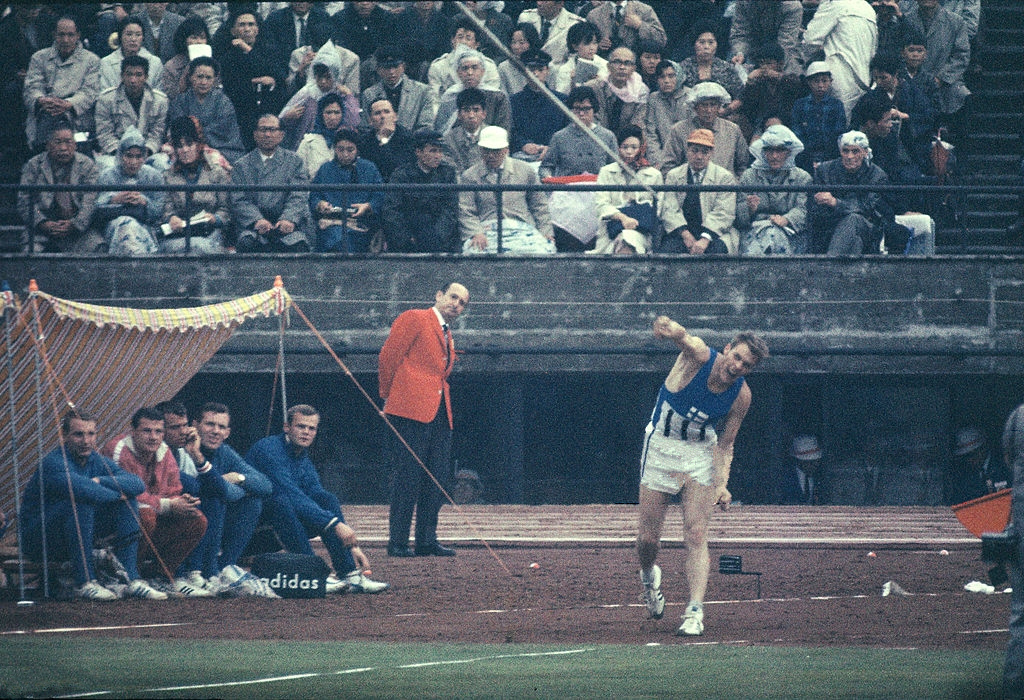
Pauli Nevala throwing

The scores from the qualification round were ignored in the final. Each thrower received three more attempts. The six best threw an additional three times, keeping the scores from all six throws.

Place	Athlete	Nation	Best mark	Throw 1	Throw 2	Throw 3	Throw 4	Throw 5	Throw 6
1	Pauli Nevala	Finland	82.66 metres	76.42	78.39	X	82.66	X	X
2	Gergely Kulcsár	Hungary	82.32 metres	75.00	77.28	78.28	82.32	78.57	79.78
3	Jānis Lūsis	Soviet Union	80.57 metres	72.51	80.57	79.85	78.94	78.07	X
4	Janusz Sidlo	Poland	80.17 metres	80.17	X	X	X	76.97	78.17
5	Urs von Wartburg	Switzerland	78.72 metres	78.72	76.84	76.36	73.08	73.12	X
6	Jorma Kinnunen	Finland	76.94 metres	72.32	76.36	71.81	76.94	X	72.45
7	Rolf Herings	United Team of Germany	74.72 metres	66.22	X	74.72			
8	Vladimir Kuznetsov	Soviet Union	74.26 metres	73.90	68.89	74.26			
9	Władysław Nikiciuk	Poland	73.11 metres	71.01	X	73.11			
10	Christos Pierrakos	Greece	72.65 metres	70.24	72.65	72.02			
11	Ed Red	United States	71.52 metres	69.39	68.15	71.52			
12	Hans Schenk	United Team of Germany	69.82 metres	69.82	66.44	68.51			
