= Mark Murro =

American javelin thrower

Marcus Paul "Mark" Murro (born June 4, 1949) is an American former javelin thrower. Murro held the United States record in men's javelin throw from 1969 to 1982 and competed in the 1968 Summer Olympics.

== Career ==
Murro broke the national high school record in men's javelin throw in 1967 while attending Essex Catholic High School in Newark, New Jersey, throwing 252 ft 8 in (77.01 m). In June 1968 he placed third at the national championships; three months later he won at the United States Olympic trials with a throw of 263 ft 9 in (80.39 m), defeating national champion Frank Covelli and qualifying for the Olympic Games in Mexico City. Murro was the top American at the Olympics, throwing 80.08 m (262 ft 8 1/2 in) and placing ninth; Track & Field News ranked him as the world's 10th best javelin thrower that year. The magazine put him on the cover of its April 1969 issue.

Murro continued improving in the next years, breaking Covelli's American record with a throw of 292 ft 8 in (89.21 m) in Tempe, Arizona on May 23, 1969. Murro won both the NCAA championship (representing Arizona State) and the national championship that year, with his national championship mark of 284 ft 3 in (86.64 m) breaking Al Cantello's meeting record from 1960. He was ranked fourth in the world that year, behind Jānis Lūsis, Pauli Nevala and Jorma Kinnunen.

Murro broke his own American record on March 27, 1970, again in Tempe; with his throw of 300 ft 0 in (91.44 m) he became the first American to reach 300 feet, as well as the first to break 90 meters. However, two months later at the Compton Invitational he slipped while throwing and sprained his ankle, missing the NCAA meet and failing to qualify for the national championship final as a result. While he continued competing, he never regained his pre-injury level; in 1970 he ranked a career-best third in the world, behind Nevala and Manfred Stolle, but after that year he never featured in the world's top 10 again. At the 1972 Olympic Trials Murro placed eighth and failed to qualify for the Olympic team.

Records
Preceded by Frank Covelli	United States record holder in men's javelin throw May 23, 1969 – Apr 17, 1982	Succeeded by Bob Roggy
