= 1958 European Athletics Championships – Men's javelin throw =

Men's javelin throw at the European Athletics Championships

The men's javelin throw at the 1958 European Athletics Championships was held in Stockholm, Sweden, at Stockholms Olympiastadion on 23 and 24 August 1958.

== Medalists ==
| Gold | Janusz Sidło; Poland |
| Silver | Egil Danielsen; Norway |
| Bronze | Gergely Kulcsár; Hungary |

== Results ==
=== Final ===
24 August

| Rank | Name | Nationality | Result | Notes |
|---|---|---|---|---|
| 1st place, gold medalist(s) | Janusz Sidło | Poland | 80.18 | CR |
| 2nd place, silver medalist(s) | Egil Danielsen | Norway | 78.27 | |
| 3rd place, bronze medalist(s) | Gergely Kulcsár | Hungary | 75.26 | |
| 4 | Michel Macquet | France | 75.18 | |
| 5 | Väinö Kuisma | Finland | 74.90 | |
| 6 | Vladimir Kuznetsov | Soviet Union | 73.89 | |
| 7 | Hans Schenk | West Germany | 73.43 | |
| 8 | Giovanni Lievore | Italy | 73.38 | |
| 9 | Knut Fredriksson | Sweden | 73.25 | |
| 10 | Zbigniew Radziwonowicz | Poland | 71.20 | |
| 11 | Carlo Lievore | Italy | 68.88 | |
| 12 | Willy Rasmussen | Norway | 68.63 | |
| 13 | Charles Vallman | Soviet Union | 67.26 | |
| 14 | Leif Hellgren | Sweden | 62.37 | |
| 15 | Alec Syrowatsky | France | 61.99 | |

=== Qualification ===
23 August

| Rank | Name | Nationality | Result | Notes |
|---|---|---|---|---|
| 1 | Knut Fredriksson | Sweden | 73.90 | Q |
| 2 | Janusz Sidło | Poland | 73.41 | Q |
| 3 | Hans Schenk | West Germany | 72.70 | Q |
| 4 | Väinö Kuisma | Finland | 71.76 | Q |
| 5 | Egil Danielsen | Norway | 70.57 | Q |
| 6 | Carlo Lievore | Italy | 70.30 | Q |
| 7 | Giovanni Lievore | Italy | 70.22 | Q |
| 8 | Gergely Kulcsár | Hungary | 69.95 | Q |
| 9 | Charles Vallman | Soviet Union | 69.80 | Q |
| 10 | Zbigniew Radziwonowicz | Poland | 69.54 | Q |
| 11 | Alec Syrowatsky | France | 69.48 | Q |
| 12 | Vladimir Kuznetsov | Soviet Union | 68.54 | Q |
| 13 | Michel Macquet | France | 67.79 | Q |
| 14 | Leif Hellgren | Sweden | 67.40 | Q |
| 15 | Willy Rasmussen | Norway | 67.35 | Q |
| 16 | Veikko Laine | Finland | 66.58 | |
| 17 | Heiner Will | West Germany | 65.36 | |
| 18 | Colin Smith | Great Britain | 65.35 | |
| 19 | Guy Van Zeune | Belgium | 59.43 | |

== Participation ==
According to an unofficial count, 19 athletes from 11 countries participated in the event.

- Belgium (1)
- Finland (2)
- France (2)
- Hungary (1)
- Italy (2)
- Norway (2)
- Poland (2)
- Soviet Union (2)
- Sweden (2)
- Great Britain (1)
- West Germany (2)
