= Athletics at the 1965 Summer Universiade – Men's javelin throw =

The men's javelin throw event at the 1965 Summer Universiade was held at the People's Stadium in Budapest on 26 August 1965.

== Medalists ==
| Gold | Silver | Bronze |
|---|---|---|
| Rolf Herings; West Germany | Vanni Rodeghiero; Italy | Lennart Hedmark; Sweden |

== Results ==
=== Qualification ===
Qualification mark: 65.00 metres

| Rank | Group | Name | Nationality | Result | Notes |
|---|---|---|---|---|---|
| 1 | ? | Lennart Hedmark | Sweden | 76.02 | Q |
| 2 | ? | Vanni Rodeghiero | Italy | 75.14 | Q |
| 3 | ? | Miklós Németh | Hungary | 72.82 | Q |
| 4 | ? | Władysław Nikiciuk | Poland | 69.54 | Q |
| 5 | ? | Alfonso de Andrés | Spain | 68.60 | Q |
| 6 | ? | Józef Głogowski | Poland | 68.30 | Q |
| 7 | ? | Christian Monneret | France | 67.90 | Q |
| 8 | ? | Rolf Bühler | Switzerland | 67.50 | Q |
| 9 | ? | Hermann Salomon | West Germany | 67.28 | Q |
| 10 | ? | Miloš Vojtek | Czechoslovakia | 66.58 | Q |
| 11 | ? | John FitzSimons | Great Britain | 66.36 | Q |
| 12 | ? | Petar Galić | Yugoslavia | 66.24 | Q |
| 13 | ? | Rolf Herings | West Germany | 65.02 | Q |
| 13 | ? | Andrej Hunčík | Czechoslovakia | 64.90 | |
| 14 | ? | Anthony Edwards | Great Britain | 63.08 | |
| 15 | ? | Walter Pektor | Austria | 61.66 | |
| 16 | ? | Richard Kunz | Austria | 61.42 | |
| 17 | ? | Mátyás Makszin | Hungary | 58.12 | |

=== Final ===
| Rank | Name | Nationality | Result | Notes |
|---|---|---|---|---|
| 1st place, gold medalist(s) | Rolf Herings | West Germany | 79.26 | UR |
| 2nd place, silver medalist(s) | Vanni Rodeghiero | Italy | 77.60 | |
| 3rd place, bronze medalist(s) | Lennart Hedmark | Sweden | 76.94 | |
| 4 | Hermann Salomon | West Germany | 76.36 | |
| 5 | Christian Monneret | France | 76.26 | |
| 6 | Józef Głogowski | Poland | 75.74 | |
| 7 | Władysław Nikiciuk | Poland | 75.58 | |
| 8 | Miklós Németh | Hungary | 73.20 | |
| 9 | Miloš Vojtek | Czechoslovakia | 69.08 | |
| 10 | Petar Galić | Yugoslavia | 68.46 | |
| 11 | John FitzSimons | Great Britain | 66.18 | |
| 12 | Rolf Bühler | Switzerland | 57.70 | |
| | Alfonso de Andrés | Spain | NM | |
