= 1971 European Athletics Championships – Men's javelin throw =

Men's javelin throw at the European Athletics Championships

The men's javelin throw at the 1971 European Athletics Championships was held in Helsinki, Finland, at Helsinki Olympic Stadium on 10 and 11 August 1971.

== Medalists ==
Gold	Jānis Lūsis; Soviet Union
Silver	Jānis Doniņš; Soviet Union
Bronze	Wolfgang Hanisch; East Germany

== Results ==
=== Final ===
11 August

Rank	Name	Nationality	Result	Notes
1st place, gold medalist(s)	Jānis Lūsis	Soviet Union	90.68	
2nd place, silver medalist(s)	Jānis Doniņš	Soviet Union	85.30	
3rd place, bronze medalist(s)	Wolfgang Hanisch	East Germany	84.22	
4	Hannu Siitonen	Finland	83.84	
5	Jorma Kinnunen	Finland	80.96	
6	Klaus Wolfermann	West Germany	80.82	
7	Władysław Nikiciuk	Poland	80.56	
8	Hermann Schlechter	West Germany	80.24	
9	Miklós Németh	Hungary	76.82	
10	József Csík	Hungary	76.24	
11	Renzo Cramerotti	Italy	72.92	
12	Urs von Wartburg	Switzerland	72.38	

=== Qualification ===
10 August

Rank	Name	Nationality	Result	Notes
1	Jānis Lūsis	Soviet Union	84.44	Q
2	Wolfgang Hanisch	East Germany	81.72	Q
3	Hannu Siitonen	Finland	80.78	Q
4	Klaus Wolfermann	West Germany	80.14	Q
5	Jānis Doniņš	Soviet Union	79.12	Q
6	József Csík	Hungary	78.80	Q
7	Władysław Nikiciuk	Poland	78.80	Q
8	Hermann Schlechter	West Germany	78.68	Q
9	Miklós Németh	Hungary	78.28	Q
10	Jorma Kinnunen	Finland	78.12	Q
11	Urs von Wartburg	Switzerland	77.84	q
12	Renzo Cramerotti	Italy	77.52	q
13	Lech Krupiński	Poland	76.60	
14	Zygmunt Jałoszyński	Poland	76.54	
15	Gergely Kulcsár	Hungary	76.48	
16	Manuel Ibanez	France	76.44	
17	Jan Pedersen	Norway	75.62	
18	Aleksandr Makarov	Soviet Union	75.60	
19	Jorma Jaakola	Finland	74.64	
20	Dave Travis	Great Britain	73.32	
21	Gerd Simonsen	West Germany	73.26	
22	Jan Svensson	Sweden	73.14	
23	Arve Olsson	Norway	72.74	
24	Jan Bohman	Sweden	72.44	
25	Manfred Stolle	East Germany	68.16	
26	Per-Eric Smiding	Sweden	62.34	

== Participation ==
According to an unofficial count, 26 athletes from 12 countries participated in the event.

- East Germany (2)
- Finland (3)
- France (1)
- Hungary (3)
- Italy (1)
- Norway (2)
- Poland (3)
- Soviet Union (3)
- Sweden (3)
- Switzerland (1)
- Great Britain (1)
- West Germany (3)
