= Athletics at the 1961 Summer Universiade – Men's javelin throw =

The men's javelin throw event at the 1961 Summer Universiade was held at the Vasil Levski National Stadium in Sofia, Bulgaria, in September 1961.

== Results ==
Rank	Athlete	Nationality	Result	Notes
1st place, gold medalist(s)	Gergely Kulcsár	Hungary	77.65	
2nd place, silver medalist(s)	Janusz Sidło	Poland	77.48	
3rd place, bronze medalist(s)	Rolf Herings	West Germany	75.67	
4	Alexandru Bizim	Romania	74.92	
5	Hermann Salomon	West Germany	72.69	
6	Takashi Miki	Japan	70.14	
7	Olavi Varis	Finland	69.50	
8	Miloš Vojtek	Czechoslovakia	69.43	
9	Mityu Dichev	Bulgaria	69.17	
10	Andrew Lane	Great Britain	67.48	
11	Franco Radman	Italy	63.69	
12	Petar Chuklev	Bulgaria	62.81	
13	Colin Bacon	Great Britain	62.78	
14	Arnoldo Pallarés	Cuba	56.43	
