= 1969 European Athletics Championships – Men's javelin throw =

Men's javelin throw at the European Athletics Championships

The men's javelin throw at the 1969 European Athletics Championships was held in Athens, Greece, at Georgios Karaiskakis Stadium on 19 September 1969.

== Medalists ==
Gold	Jānis Lūsis; Soviet Union
Silver	Pauli Nevala; Finland
Bronze	Janusz Sidło; Poland

== Results ==
=== Final ===
19 September

Rank	Name	Nationality	Result	Notes
1st place, gold medalist(s)	Jānis Lūsis	Soviet Union	91.52	CR
2nd place, silver medalist(s)	Pauli Nevala	Finland	89.58	
3rd place, bronze medalist(s)	Janusz Sidło	Poland	82.90	
4	Gergely Kulcsár	Hungary	81.14	
5	Wiesław Sierański	Poland	79.74	
6	Jānis Doniņš	Soviet Union	79.10	
7	Esko Kuutti	Finland	78.84	
8	Władysław Nikiciuk	Poland	77.48	
9	Dave Travis	Great Britain	76.32	
10	Jorma Kinnunen	Finland	74.82	
11	Andreas Kaponis	Greece	73.24	
12	Carlo Lievore	Italy	72.06	
13	Milcho Milevski	Bulgaria	71.66	

== Participation ==
According to an unofficial count, 13 athletes from 8 countries participated in the event.

- Bulgaria (1)
- Finland (3)
- Greece (1)
- Hungary (1)
- Italy (1)
- Poland (3)
- Soviet Union (2)
- Great Britain (1)
