= Athletics at the 1963 Summer Universiade – Men's javelin throw =

The men's javelin throw event at the 1963 Summer Universiade was held at the Estádio Olímpico Monumental in Porto Alegre in September 1963.

== Results ==
Rank	Athlete	Nationality	Result	Notes
1st place, gold medalist(s)	Janis Lūsis	Soviet Union	79.77	
2nd place, silver medalist(s)	Hermann Salomon	West Germany	77.78	
3rd place, bronze medalist(s)	Gergely Kulcsár	Hungary	77.62	
4	Rolf Herings	West Germany	74.05	
5	Christian Monneret	France	71.90	
6	Vanni Rodeghiero	Italy	71.88	
7	Takashi Miki	Japan	68.70	
8	Alfonso de Andrés	Spain	63.19	
9	Paulo Texeira	Brazil	46.44	
10	Mário Parashim	Brazil	43.96	
