= Pierrakos =

Pierrakos is a surname. Notable people with the surname include:

- John Pierrakos
- Periklis Pierrakos-Mavromichalis
- Mimis Pierrakos
- Christos Pierrakos
- Alkis Pierrakos
