= Tsybulenko =

Tsybulenko (Ukrainian: Цибуленко) is a surname of Ukrainian origin. The surname, Tsybulenko, was created by adding the Ukrainian patronimic suffix, -enko, to word (Ukrainian: цибуля — onion).

== People ==
- Evhen Tsybulenko (born 1972), Ukrainian-Estonian professor of international law
- Mykola Tsybulenko (1942–1998), Ukrainian major general
- Viktor Tsybulenko (1930–2013), Ukrainian javelin thrower
- Viktoriia Tsybulenko (born 1978), Ukrainian handball player
