= Athletics at the 1957 World University Games – Men's javelin throw =

The men's javelin throw event at the 1957 World University Games was held at the Stadium Charlety in Paris with the final on 8 September 1957.

== Medalists ==
Gold	Silver	Bronze
Viktor Kompaniyets; Soviet Union	Jan Kopyto; Poland	Tadeusz Paprocki; Poland

== Results ==
=== Final ===
Rank	Name	Nationality	#1	#2	#3	#4	#5	#6	Result	Notes
1st place, gold medalist(s)	Viktor Tsybulenko	Soviet Union	76.69	x	76.68	80.63	72.58	72.13	80.63	GR
2nd place, silver medalist(s)	Jan Kopyto	Poland	72.74	74.49	75.35	77.79	x	x	77.79	
3rd place, bronze medalist(s)	Tadeusz Paprocki	Poland	x	69.24	71.47	73.58	72.22	x	73.58	
4	Luitpold Maier	West Germany	73.38	x	66.29	60.42	x	62.57	73.38	
5	Gergely Kulcsár	Hungary	65.94	67.28	x	62.61	x	68.40	68.40	
6	Hermann Rieder	West Germany	67.48	65.03	63.92	64.93	64.78	65.45	67.48	
7	Giovanni Lievore	Italy							67.13	
8	Manfred Hütsch	West Germany							66.00	
9	Gheorghe Popescu	Romania							65.66	
10	Alexandru Bizim	Romania							64.80	
11	Guy Van Zeune	Belgium							63.42	
12	Raymond Davies	Great Britain							62.09	
13	Raffaele Bonaiuto	Italy							60.57	
14	Pavel Jílek	Czechoslovakia							60.08	
15	John Roberts	Great Britain							59.00	
16	John Lawson	Ireland							46.75	
