= Willy Rasmussen =

Norwegian javelin thrower

Personal information
- Born: 3 December 1937 Kongsberg, Norway
- Died: 12 August 2018 (aged 80)
- Height: 186 cm (6 ft 1 in)

Sport
- Sport: Athletics
- Event: Javelin throw
- Club: IL Bergkameratene; IK Tjalve

Achievements and titles
- Personal best: 84.18 m (1961)

Willy Lorang Rasmussen (3 December 1937 – 12 August 2018) was a Norwegian javelin thrower.

He placed twelfth at the 1958 European Championships, fifth at the 1960 Olympic Games and ninth at the 1962 European Championships. He also competed at the 1964 Olympic Games and the 1966 European Championships without reaching the final. Rasmussen won the national title in 1958, 1959, 1961 and 1965. He represented the clubs Bergkameratene and IK Tjalve.

His personal best throw was 84.18 metres (old type), achieved in August 1961 on Bislett stadion. This put him seventh on the Norwegian all-time list, behind Terje Pedersen, Per Erling Olsen, Reidar Lorentzen, Bjørn Grimnes, Terje Thorslund and Egil Danielsen.

Outside of sports, Rasmussen spent his entire career in the police force. He died at the age of 80.
