= Athletics at the 1961 Summer Universiade – Men's decathlon =

The men's decathlon event at the 1961 Summer Universiade was held at the Vasil Levski National Stadium in Sofia, Bulgaria, on 31 August and 1 September 1961.

The winning margin was an astonishing 1,692 points which as of 2024 remains the only time the men's decathlon was won by more than 400 points at these games.

== Results ==
| Rank | Athlete | Nationality | 100m | LJ | SP | HJ | 400m | 110m H | DT | PV | JT | 1500m | Points | Notes |
|---|---|---|---|---|---|---|---|---|---|---|---|---|---|---|
| 1st place, gold medalist(s) | Vasili Kuznetsov | Soviet Union | 10.9 | 7.29 | 13.94 | 1.83 | 49.7 | 15.0 | 47.73 | 4.10 | 67.03 | 4:59.0 | 7918 | |
| 2nd place, silver medalist(s) | Milan Kuzmanov | Bulgaria | | | | | | | | | | | 6226 | |
| 3rd place, bronze medalist(s) | Klaus-Dieter Röper | West Germany | | | | | | | | | | | 6209 | |
| 4 | Hermann Salomon | West Germany | | | | | | | | | | | 6147 | |
| 5 | Josef Habr | Czechoslovakia | | | | | | | | | | | 6047 | |
| 6 | Johannes de Haas | Netherlands | | | | | | | | | | | 6004 | |
| 7 | Mario Piccolo | Italy | | | | | | | | | | | 5782 | |
| 8 | Yordan Dzhikelov | Bulgaria | | | | | | | | | | | 5249 | |
