= Jan Kopyto =

Polish javelin thrower (born 1934)

Personal information
- Nationality: Polish
- Born: 15 June 1934 (age 92) Goczałki, Poland
- Height: 1.80 m (5 ft 11 in)
- Weight: 88 kg (194 lb)

Sport
- Sport: Javelin throw
- Club: Unia Zielona Góra(1953-1955); AZS Warszawa (1956-1958)

Jan Antoni Kopyto (born 15 June 1934 in Goczałki) is a Polish javelin thrower. He competed at the 1956 Summer Olympics in Melbourne, where he placed fifth in men's javelin throw. Shortly before the 1960 Summer Olympics he suffered a serious shoulder injury, which effectively ended his career. He later emigrated to the United Kingdom.

His personal best with the old model javelin was 83.37 metres set in 1957.

== International competitions ==
Year	Competition	Venue	Position	Event	Notes
Representing Poland
1956	Olympic Games	Melbourne, Australia	5th	Javelin throw	74.28 m
1957	World Festival of Youth and Students	Moscow, Soviet Union	2nd	Javelin throw	76.70 m
1957	World University Games	Paris, France	2nd	Javelin throw	77.79 m
