= Hans Schenk =

Hans Schenk may refer to:

- Hans Schenk (athlete) (1936–2006), German javelin thrower
- Hans Schenk (economist) (born 1949), Dutch economist
