= Walter Krüger =

Walter Krüger may refer to:

- Walter Krueger (1881–1967), United States Army general during World War II and military historian
- Walter Krüger (architect) (1888–1971), German builder of public monuments, including Tannenberg Memorial
- Walter Krüger (SS general) (1890–1945), German SS officer and military commander during World War II
- Walter Krüger (Wehrmacht general) (1892–1973), German military commander during World War II; leader of Panzer division
- Walter Krüger (athlete) (1930-2018), German track and field athlete

== See also ==
- Kruger
