= Aurelio Janet =

Cuban javelin thrower

Personal information
- Full name: Aurelio Janet Torres
- Born: 17 September 1945 San Luis, Santiago de Cuba, Cuba
- Died: November 23, 1968 (aged 23)
- Height: 1.86 m (6 ft 1 in)
- Weight: 84 kg (185 lb)

Sport
- Country: Cuba
- Sport: Javelin throw

Achievements and titles
- Personal best: 80.10 m (1968)

Aurelio Janet was a Cuban Olympic javelin thrower. He represented his country in the men's javelin throw at the 1968 Summer Olympics. His distance was an 80.10 in the qualifiers and a 74.88 in the finals.

He died in a car accident just 4 weeks after the Olympiad. He was en route to a sports event in Santa Clara, Cuba.

== International competitions ==
Year	Competition	Venue	Position	Event	Notes
Representing Cuba
1966	Central American and Caribbean Games	San Juan, Puerto Rico	7th	Javelin throw (old)	61.78 m
1968	Olympic Games	Mexico City, Mexico	11th	Javelin throw (old)	74.88 m
