= Viktor Aksonov =

Soviet javelin thrower (born 1941)

Personal information
- Nationality: Soviet
- Born: 26 July 1941 (age 84) Kharkiv, Soviet Union

Sport
- Sport: Athletics
- Event: Javelin throw

Viktor Aksonov (born 26 July 1941) is a Soviet athlete. He competed in the men's javelin throw at the 1964 Summer Olympics.
