= Myron Anyfantakis =

Greek javelin thrower

Personal information
- Nationality: Greek
- Born: 23 October 1939 (age 86) Rethymno, Greece

Sport
- Sport: Athletics
- Event: Javelin throw

Myron Anyfantakis (born 23 October 1939) is a Greek athlete. He competed in the men's javelin throw at the 1960 Summer Olympics.
