= Evhen Tsybulenko =

Legal scholar

- Євген Цибуленко
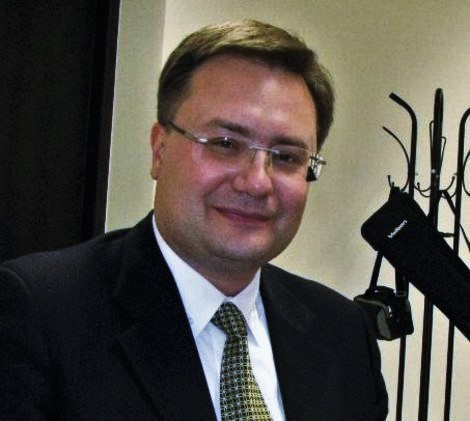
- Born: 21 October 1972 (age 54); Simferopol, Crimean Oblast, Ukrainian SSR, Soviet Union (now Ukraine)
- Citizenship: Estonia

Academic background
- Education: Kyiv National University (LL.M. 1996, PhD 2000)

Academic work
- Discipline: International Humanitarian Law
- Institutions: Tallinn University of Technology

Evhen Tsybulenko (Ukrainian: Євген Цибуленко, b. 21. October 1972 in Simferopol, Ukraine) is a Ukrainian legal scholar. He is professor of law at the Tallinn University of Technology and Kyiv International University and is focused on International Humanitarian Law.

== Academic career ==
Tsybulenko graduated from Kyiv National University in 1996 as LL.M. and obtained PhD in International Law in 2000. He has conducted postdoctoral research at the International Human Rights Law Institute of DePaul University in Chicago during 2002, and has worked at the International Committee of the Red Cross and in Kyiv International University.

He was a founder and director of the Tallinn Law School Human Rights Centre during 2007–2014 and was elected as professor of law in 2005. Tsybulenko had been appointed as a Chair of International and Comparative Law department but due to the reorganisation of departments in 2010 International and Comparative Law department was closed. He has been an adjunct (visiting) professor and senior visiting mentor of Joint Command and General Staff Course (JCGSC) at Baltic Defence College.

Tsybulenko is an external expert of the International Committee of the Red Cross, Estonian Red Cross, Estonian Integration Commission, Directorate-General for Education and Culture of European Commission and the Organization for Security and Co-operation in Europe (OSCE). Tsybulenko also gives lectures at Warsaw International Humanitarian Law (IHL) International Summer Academy, Baltic Summer Academy, and Commonwealth of Independent States Summer School on IHL.

Tsybulenko has published more than 40 scientific books and articles as well as more than 400 general-interest articles, comments and interviews. Publications are primarily in English, Ukrainian and Russian. His articles and interviews has been translated to 25 languages such as Estonian, French, German, Spanish, Chinese, Arabic, etc.

Tsybulenko has taken also part on drafting laws e.g. he participated on preparation of a law concerning the protection of Red Cross and Red Crescent symbols in Ukraine as well as has provided assistance on a bill at Estonian Parliament to define Russia's war in Ukraine as genocide against Ukrainians.

=== Selected scientific works ===
1. Цибуленко Євген Миколайович. Міжнародно-правове регулювання застосування звичайних озброєнь: Дис… канд. юрид. наук: 12.00.11 / Київський ун-т ім. Тараса Шевченка. Інститут міжнародних відносин. — К., 1999. — 184 л. — Бібліогр.: л.166–182.
2. Tsybulenko, E.; Mesila, L. (2025) Interaction of EU and EU Member State Laws in Relation to Frozen Russian Assets. In: LEX PORTUS, 11(3), pp. 36-52.
3. Tsybulenko, E.; Diaz, E. (2024) The treaty of Spitzbergen: Problems and solutions for an Arctic future. In: Bevz, S.; Podolyak, S.; Sydorenko, V. (Ed.). Challenges and legal support of the economy in the conditions of digitalization. Lira-K, Kyiv, pp. 101-111.
4. Tsybulenko, E.; Rinta-Pollari, H. (2023) Legal Challenges in Prosecuting the Crime of Aggression in the Russo-Ukrainian War. In: Review of Central and East European Law, 48 (3–4), pp. 319–350.
5. Tsybulenko E., Kajander A. (2022) Customary International Humanitarian Law and Article 36 of Additional Protocol I to the Geneva Conventions: A Stopgap Regulator of Autonomous Weapons Systems? In: TalTech Journal of European Studies, 12 (2), pp. 87–112.
6. Tsybulenko, E.; Platonova, A. (2022) Legal Instruments of the Shanghai Cooperation Organisation: A Case of Missed Opportunities? In: Sayapin S., Burnashev R. (Eds.). Central Asian Yearbook of International Law and International Relations. Volume 1. Eleven, The Hague, pp. 244–257.
7. Tsybulenko, E. (2022). Blinding Laser Weapons. In: Sayapin, S. et al. (Eds.). International Conflict and Security Law. T.M.C. Asser Press/Springer, The Hague, pp. 367–378.
8. Tsybulenko, E. (2022). Fuel air explosive weapons. In: Sayapin, S. et al. (Eds.). International Conflict and Security Law. T.M.C. Asser Press/Springer, The Hague, pp. 379–388.
9. Tsybulenko, E.; Platonova, A. (2022). Current Issues of Hague Law. In: Sayapin, S. et al. (Eds.). International Conflict and Security Law. T.M.C. Asser Press/Springer, The Hague, pp. 389–397.
10. Tsybulenko, E.; Suarez, S. (2022). INTERPOL. In: Sayapin, S. et al. (Eds.). International Conflict and Security Law. T.M.C. Asser Press/Springer, The Hague, pp. 673–691.
11. Tsybulenko E., Kajander A. (2021) The Hybrid Arsenal of Russia’s War Against the Democratic World. In: Mölder H., Sazonov V., Chochia A., Kerikmäe T. (eds) The Russian Federation in Global Knowledge Warfare. Contributions to International Relations. Springer, Cham. pp. 173–194.
12. Tsybulenko E., Tetera, I. (2021) Occupation of Crimea and military invasion of Donbas: International law and responsibility of the Russian Federation. In: Lodyn, P. (ed) Surviving near the empire: Price of the modern Kremlin's aggression. GOTsPND/IWP, Ivano-Frankivsk, pp. 152–182.
13. Цибуленко, Є.; Лобода, К. (2020). "Українська енциклопедія міжнародного права у світовому контексті" у "Український часопис міжнародного права / Ukrainian Journal of International Law", №3/2020, ст. 165–168.
14. Цибуленко, Є.; Тетера, І. (2020). "Міжнародно-правова кваліфікація окупації Донбасу. Псевдодержави і колабораціонізм на цій території" у "Право України", №11/2020, ст. 65–79.
15. Kajander, A., Kasper, A., Tsybulenko, Е. (2020). Making the Cyber Mercenary – Autonomous Weapons Systems and Common Article 1 of the Geneva Conventions. In: Jančárková, T. et al. (eds) 12th International Conference on Cyber Conflict. 20/20 Vision: The Next Decade. NATO CCDCOE Publications, Tallinn, pp. 79–95.
16. Tsybulenko, Е., Platonova, A. (2019). Violations of Freedom of Expression and Freedom of Religion by the Russian Federation as the Occupying Power in Crimea. In: Baltic Journal of European Studies, 9 (3 (28)), pp. 134–147.
17. Sayapin, S.; Tsybulenko, E. (Eds.) (2018) The Use of Force against Ukraine and International Law: Jus Ad Bellum, Jus In Bello, Jus Post Bellum. Springer, ISBN 978-94-6265-221-7
18. Tsybulenko E., Francis J.A. (2018) Separatists or Russian Troops and Local Collaborators? Russian Aggression in Ukraine: The Problem of Definitions. In: Sayapin S., Tsybulenko E. (eds) The Use of Force against Ukraine and International Law. T.M.C. Asser Press/Springer, The Hague, pp. 123–144.
19. Tsybulenko E., Kelichavyi B. (2018) International Legal Dimensions of the Russian Occupation of Crimea. In: Sayapin S., Tsybulenko E. (eds) The Use of Force against Ukraine and International Law. T.M.C. Asser Press/Springer, The Hague, pp. 277–296.
20. Tsybulenko, E.; Pakhomenko, S. (2016). The Ukrainian Crisis As A Challenge For The Eastern Partnership. In: Kerikmäe, T.; Chochia, A. (Ed.). Political and Legal Perspectives of the EU Eastern Partnership Policy. Springer International Publishing, 167–179.
21. Tsybulenko, E.; Hlushchenko, S. (2014). Comparative analysis of some aspects of the legal status of the Secretary of the Chamber of Higher Specialized Court of Ukraine and the Chair of judicial chamber of the Supreme Court of Latvia. L’Europe unie/United Europe, 7-8/2013-14, 25 — 30.
22. Tsybulenko, E.; Amorosa, P. (2012). National minorities in Estonia: 20 years of citizenship policies . L’Europe unie/United Europe, 6/2012, 85 — 90.
23. Tsybulenko, Evhen (2010). Ukraina kasutamata jäänud võimalus. Poliitika, riigiteadus, rahvusvahelised suhted, 24 — 34.
24. Цибуленко, Є. (2008). Українська громада Естонії як чинник політичного пливу. Національна академія наук України. Інститут історії України. (Eds.). Українці в Естонії: вчора, сьогодні, завтра (76 — 80). Київ: Геопринт
25. Цыбуленко, Е. H. (2008). Кто победил в «войне с террором»? Международное сообщество и глобализация угроз безопасности: сборник научных докладов. В 2 частях. Часть 2: Международное сообщество и национальные государства в поиске ответов на новые угрозы безопасности. (241—244). Великий Новгород: НовГУ имени Ярослава Мудрого.
26. Margassova, R.; Meiorg, M.; Ponomarjova, U.; Tsybulenko, E. (2008). ja pagulaste vabatahtliku tagasipöördumise toetamine, Uuringu lõpparuanne, Tallinn 2008, издание Центра по правам человека.
27. Цибуленко, Є. (автор раздела 2, п.3); (2007). Воєнні аспекти міжнародного права (видання 2-ге, доопрацьоване). Київ: Азимут-Україна (видання здійснене за фінансування Міжнародного Комітету Червоного Хреста).
28. Максименко, С. (2005, рецензент: Evhen Tsybulenko). Шенгенское право и свобода передвижения: международно-правовые аспекты глобальной миграции. Одесса: Астропринт, 192 с., ISBN 966-318-406-X.
29. Цибуленко, Є. (2004). Чубарєв Валентин Леонідович. Національна академія наук України. Інститут держави і права ім. В. М. Корецького (Eds.). Юридична енциклопедія (417—418). Київ: Українська енциклопедія
30. Tsybulenko, Evhen (2003). Implementation of International Humanitarian Law: experience of the Netherlands. International Law and National Legislation, 28 — 30.
31. Цибуленко, Є (2003), автор раздела в: Міжнародне право: військові аспекти: Навчальний посібник: Рекомендовано МОН/ За ред. В. Б. Толубка. Київ: Національна Академія Оборони України, 2003. 252 с.
32. Базов, В. (2003, рецензент: Evhen Tsybulenko). Кримінальна відповідальність за серйозні порушення міжнародного гуманітарного права. Київ: Істина
33. Цибуленко, Є (2002). Засоби ведення війни та захист навколишнього середовища. Український часопис міжнародного права, 42 — 47.
34. Цибуленко, Є. (2001). Міжнародний Комітет Червоного Хреста. Національна академія наук України. Інститут держави і права ім. В. М. Корецького (Eds.). Юридична енциклопедія (680—681). Київ: Українська енциклопедія
35. Цибуленко, Є. (2001). Міжнародна Федерація Товариств Червоного Хреста і Червоного Півмісяця. Національна академія наук України. Інститут держави і права ім. В. М. Корецького (Eds.). Юридична енциклопедія (662). Київ: Українська енциклопедія
36. Цибуленко, Є. (2001). Міжнародний Рух Червоного Хреста і Червоного Півмісяця. Національна академія наук України. Інститут держави і права ім. В. М. Корецького (Eds.). Юридична енциклопедія (688). Київ: Українська енциклопедія
37. Цибуленко, Є. (2001). Конвенція про заборону військового або будь-якого іншого ворожого використання засобів впливу на природне середовище. Національна академія наук України. Інститут держави і права ім. В. М. Корецького (Eds.). Юридична енциклопедія (225). Київ: Українська енциклопедія
38. Цибуленко, Є. (2001). Конвенція про заборону або обмеження застосування конкретних видів звичайної зброї, які можуть вважатися такими, що завдають надмірні пошкодження або мають невибіркову дію. Національна академія наук України. Інститут держави і права ім. В. М. Корецького (Eds.). Юридична енциклопедія (225). Київ: Українська енциклопедія
39. Цибуленко, Є. (2001). Конвенція про заборону застосування, накопичення, виробництва і розповсюдження протипіхотних мін та їх знищення. Національна академія наук України. Інститут держави і права ім. В. М. Корецького (Eds.). Юридична енциклопедія (225—226). Київ: Українська енциклопедія
40. Tsybulenko, E. (2001). The fourth student competition for F.F. Martens simultaneously took place in Moscow, Kiev and Tashkent. Международное право — International Law, 343—344.
41. Цибуленко, Є. (2000). Обмеження застосування звичайної зброї. Юридичний вісник, 105—109.
42. Дмитрієв, А.; Дяченко, В.; Цибуленко, Є.; Цюрупа, М. (2000). Міжнародне гуманітарне право: філософсько-правова доктрина регулювання збройних конфліктів. Четверта книга: Джерела, Принципи, Норми. Київ: Сфера
43. Цибуленко, Є.; Цимбалюк, М.; Шинкаренко, Л. (2000). Поширення знань про Міжнародний Рух Червоного Хреста і Червоного Півмісяця та Міжнародне Гуманітарне Право (Посібник). Київ: Нора-Прінт
44. Базов, В.; Качан, І.; Майоров, І.; Поніматченко, Ю. (2000, руководитель: Evhen Tsybulenko). Міжнародне гуманітарне право: Навчальний посібник. Варта
45. Цибуленко, Є. (1999). Оттавська конвенція — інструмент заборони протипіхотних мін (доповнена). Право України, 118—121.
46. Цибуленко, Є.; Заблоцька, Л. (1999). Оттавська конвенція — інструмент заборони протипіхотних мін. Світовий рух за заборону протипіхотних мін. Відповідь України? (120—128). Київ: Український незалежний центр політичних досліджень
47. Цибуленко, Є. (1999). Протипіхотні міни і міжнародне гуманітарне право. Держава і право. Щорічник наукових праць молодих вчених. (423—428). Київ: Ін Юре
48. Цибуленко, Є. (1998). Зброя об’ємного вибуху в світлі міжнародного гуманітарного права (доповнена). Право України, 109—113.
49. Цибуленко, Є. (1998). Пекельна зброя . Вісник Червоного Хреста України, 28 — 29.
50. Цибуленко, Є. (1997). Зброя об’ємного вибуху в світлі міжнародного гуманітарного права. Вісник Київського національного університету імені Тараса Шевченка, випуск 7, 124—128.
51. Цыбуленко, Е. (1997). Противопехотные мины — вызов, брошенный человечеству. Красный Крест. Бюллетень Белорусского Красного Креста, 10 — 11.
52. Tsybulenko, E. (1996). The problem of the prohibition of mines and blinding laser weapons. The Ukrainian Journal of Human Rights, 136—140.
53. Цибуленко, Є. (1996). Проблема заборони мін та засліплюючої лазерної зброї. Український часопис прав людини, 49 — 53.

== Political views ==
Tsybulenko is known for his strong criticism against the Russian Federation. He has for example called for rebellion against the Russian law enforcement which caused a protest of Russian Embassy in Estonia and the embassy calling pro-Russia activists to propose termination of Tsybulenko Estonian citizenship.

Among other things Tsybulenko has condemned communist ideology as criminal, recognised Holodomor as a genocide against Ukrainians. Tsybulenko has also actively criticised the policies of the former Ukrainian President Yanukovych and his administration. He supports the Ukrainian Insurgent Army and have argued that it cannot be characterised as "nationalist" but rather "national liberation" movement. During the Russo-Georgian War, he supported Georgia. Tsybulenko has signed a number of appeals of the Russian opposition, including the Putin Must Go appeal in 2010.

In Estonian politics, he has presented right-wing views and often criticises the Estonian Center Party, a left-wing populist party immensely popular among non-Estonians.

== Private life ==
Tsybulenko's father was general major Mykola Tsybulenko.

Tsybulenko acquired in 2009 Estonian citizenship for achievements of special merits.

Tsybulenko was the head of Ukrainian Community in Estonia (2017–19).
