= Aleksandr Gorshkov (athlete) =

Soviet javelin thrower

Personal information
- Nationality: Soviet
- Born: 25 November 1928 Moscow, Soviet Union
- Died: 20 January 1993 (aged 64)

Sport
- Sport: Athletics
- Event: Javelin throw

Aleksandr Gorshkov (25 November 1928 – 20 January 1993) was a Soviet athlete. He competed in the men's javelin throw at the 1956 Summer Olympics.
