= Abdul Wardak =

Afghan athlete (born 1940)

Abdalsalam Al-Dabaji
Personal information
- Nationality: Afghanistan
- Born: 15 August 1940 (age 85)

Sport
- Sport: Athletics
- Event: 110 m hurdles

Abdul Hakim Wardak (born 15 August 1940) is a former Afghanistan track and field athlete, who specialised in hurdling. Wardak competed at the 1960 Summer Olympic Games in the men's 110 m hurdles and the Men's javelin throw; he failed to advance in either. He was born in Kabul.
