= Hideta Kanai =

Japanese javelin thrower (born 1938)

Personal information
- Nationality: Japanese
- Born: 7 May 1938 (age 88)

Sport
- Sport: Athletics
- Event: Javelin throw

Hideta Kanai (金井 秀太, Kanai Hideta; born 7 May 1938) is a Japanese athlete. He competed in the men's javelin throw at the 1964 Summer Olympics.
