= IL Bergkameratene =

Norwegian multi-sports club

- Full name: Idrettslaget Bergkameratene
- Founded: 29 May 1929
- Arena: Kongsberg idrettshall, Kongsberg

Idrettslaget Bergkameratene is a Norwegian multi-sports club from Kongsberg.

The club was founded on 29 May 1929 as Kongsberg AIL, being affiliated with the Workers' Federation of Sports. This federation being dissolved after World War II, the club changed its name and joined the Confederation of Sports in 1945. The club had sections for association football, team handball, Nordic skiing, speed skating, orienteering and athletics. The club colours were navy blue and white. Javelin thrower Willy Rasmussen represented Bergkameratene.

In the 1980s, Bergkameratene had teams in the highest division for both men and women in both volleyball and basketball. The women's volleyball team stood out, being champions of the Norwegian Women's Volleyball League. The men's basketball team later took the moniker Kongsberg Penguins, winning the Norwegian basketball championship in 2001. Following a name change to Kongsberg Miners, it took two more championships in 2018 and 2019.

Sections for wrestling and sport shooting were active in the early years, but later discontinued. By 1990, Bergkameratene had seven sporting codes and a total of 1,600 members, leading to the creation of independent legal entities for basketball, volleyball, handball, skiing, table tennis, judo and swimming.
