= Arve Olsson =

Norwegian javelin thrower

Arve Olsson (born 28 August 1945) is a retired Norwegian javelin thrower.

In the Norwegian championships he won a silver medal in 1966 and a bronze in 1968, before winning the title in 1970 and 1971. Olsson represented the clubs Oslo TF and Oslo IL. His victory in the 1971 gave Olsson the 1971 King's Cup. The winning result, 81.28 metres (old type), was also his career best. He proceeded to compete at the 1971 European Championships without reaching the final.
