= Mykola Tsybulenko =

Ukrainian major general

- Микола Васильович Цибуленко
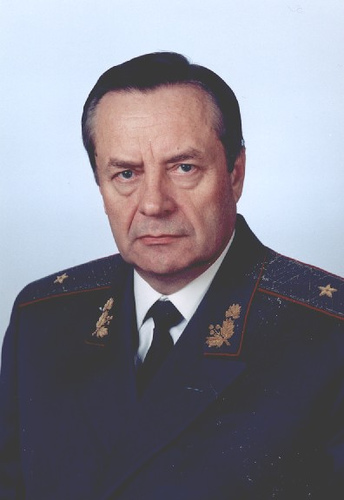
- Born: Mykola Vasyliovych Tsybulenko; 1942; Vepryk, Kyiv Oblast
- Died: 1998 (aged 55–56)

Mykola Vasyliovych Tsybulenko (Ukrainian: Микола Васильович Цибуленко; 1942–1998) was a Ukrainian major general.

== Biography ==
General Tsybulenko was born in the village of Vepryk, Fastiv Raion, Kyiv Oblast. He graduated from Caucasian Suvorov Military School with a silver medal. He is also an alumnus of the Leningrad Higher Military-Command School, the Frunze Military Academy, and the Academy of the Armed Forces of Ukraine. In 1992, he was elected as a member-correspondent of the Engineering Academy of Ukraine with a specialty of communications. He served on command positions in various military districts of Soviet Union and abroad.

After the collapse of Soviet Union, Tsybulenko made a major contribution to the creation of the armed forces of newly independent Ukraine, especially in Crimea. He was an active participant of the Union of Officers of Ukraine. He was the founder and the first chief of the Odesa Institute of Land Forces (later Odesa Military Academy). He was the first head of the foreign relations department of the Ukrainian General Staff. Tsybulenko took part in several armed conflicts. He had numerous decorations and medals of Soviet Union, and many foreign states. He was decorated with the Cross of the Union of former Ukrainian warriors in Canada, and with the Cross of the Union of Officers of Ukraine for patriotism and fidelity to the Ukrainian State (posthumously).

== See also ==
- Viktor Tsybulenko
- Evhen Tsybulenko
