= Athletics at the 1956 Summer Olympics – Men's javelin throw =

Men's javelin at the Games of the XVI Olympiad
- Venue: Melbourne Cricket Ground
- Date: 26 November 1956
- Competitors: 21 from 12 nations
- Winning distance: 85.71 WR

Medalists
1st place, gold medalist(s)		Egil Danielsen; Norway
2nd place, silver medalist(s)		Janusz Sidło; Poland
3rd place, bronze medalist(s)		Viktor Tsybulenko; Soviet Union

The men's javelin throw was an event at the 1956 Summer Olympics in Melbourne, Australia. The qualifying stage and the final both were held on the third day of the track and field competition, on Monday November 26, 1956.

The 1956 Olympic Games are notable for being the only time that Finland did not take part in this event.

== Results ==
=== Qualification ===
Qualifying distance: 66 metres

Rank	Athlete	Nation	1	2	3	Distance	Notes
1	Cy Young	United States	63.30	74.76		74.76	Q, OR
2	Egil Danielsen	Norway	74.15			74.15	Q
3	Vladimir Kuznetzov	Soviet Union	64.88	73.89		73.89	Q
4	Herbert Koschel	United Team of Germany	72.90			72.90	Q
5	Aleksandr Gorshkov	Soviet Union	72.31			72.31	Q
6	Janusz Sidło	Poland	72.00			72.00	Q
7	Michel Macquet	France	71.23			71.23	Q
8	Viktor Tsybulenko	Soviet Union	71.20			71.20	Q
9	Benny Garcia	United States	71.17			71.17	Q
10	Heiner Will	United Team of Germany	52.56	64.68	70.38	70.38	Q
11	Giovanni Lievore	Italy	69.64			69.64	Q
12	Phil Conley	United States	68.50			68.50	Q
13	Jan Kopyto	Poland	68.19			68.19	Q
14	Muhammad Nawaz	Pakistan	59.44	61.62	67.57	67.57	Q
15	Sándor Krasznai	Hungary	61.87	67.39		67.39	Q
16	Bob Grant	Australia	x	65.76	61.50	65.76	
17	Jalal Khan	Pakistan	65.35	x	61.61	65.35	
18	Léon Syrovatski	France	61.06	62.65	64.58	64.58	
19	Reinaldo Oliver	Puerto Rico	55.85	52.42	63.68	63.68	
20	Peter Cullen	Great Britain	x	61.37	62.77	62.77	
21	Jim Achurch	Australia	57.09	43.43	x	57.09	

=== Final ===
Rank	Athlete	Nation	1	2	3	4	5	6	Distance	Notes
1st place, gold medalist(s)	Egil Danielsen	Norway	72.60	68.49	70.75	85.71	72.60	68.86	85.71	WR
2nd place, silver medalist(s)	Janusz Sidło	Poland	72.78	x	79.98	79.70	75.79	73.50	79.98	
3rd place, bronze medalist(s)	Viktor Tsybulenko	Soviet Union	74.96	75.84	71.74	79.50	72.98	63.24	79.50	
4	Herbert Koschel	United Team of Germany	74.68	60.80	69.88	61.66	x	61.29	74.68	
5	Jan Kopyto	Poland	71.82	73.32	73.02	74.28	57.20	73.27	74.28	
6	Giovanni Lievore	Italy	71.26	72.88	67.46	65.58	64.87	55.78	72.88	
7	Michel Macquet	France	70.03	70.11	71.84				71.84	
8	Aleksandr Gorshkov	Soviet Union	x	x	70.32				70.32	
9	Heiner Will	United Team of Germany	69.86	67.39	x				69.86	
10	Phil Conley	United States	69.74	60.92	69.59				69.74	
11	Cy Young	United States	x	66.32	68.64				68.64	
12	Vladimir Kuznetzov	Soviet Union	65.65	62.80	67.14				67.14	
13	Sándor Krasznai	Hungary	66.33	60.03	59.78				66.33	
14	Muhammad Nawaz	Pakistan	62.55	59.42	61.13				62.55	
	Benny Garcia	United States	x	x	x				NM	
