= Władysław Nikiciuk =

Polish javelin thrower

Wladyslaw Nikiciuk
Personal information
- Nationality: Polish
- Born: 9 March 1940 (age 86) Devyatkovichi, Byelorussian SSR, Soviet Union
- Height: 182 cm (6 ft 0 in)
- Weight: 88 kg (194 lb)

Sport
- Sport: Athletics
- Event: Javelin throw

Achievements and titles
- Personal best: 86.10
Medal record
Men's athletics
Representing Poland
European Championships
Silver medal – second place	1966 Budapest	Javelin throw
Bronze medal – third place	1962 Belgrade	Javelin throw

Wladyslaw Nikiciuk (born 9 March 1940) is a Polish Olympic javelin thrower. He represented his country in the men's javelin throw at the 1968 Summer Olympics, as well as the men's javelin throw at the 1964 Summer Olympics. His distance was a 73.45 in the qualifiers and a 73.11 in the finals in 1964, and an 81.00 in qualifying and an 85.70 in the finals in 1968.

Nikiciuk won the British AAA Championships title in the javelin throw event at the 1969 AAA Championships.

== International competitions ==
Year	Competition	Venue	Position	Event	Notes
Representing Poland
1962	European Championships	Belgrade, Serbia	3rd	Javelin throw	77.66 m
1964	Olympic Games	Tokyo, Japan	9th	Javelin throw	73.11 m
1965	Universiade	Budapest, Hungary	7th	Javelin throw	75.58 m
1966	European Championships	Budapest, Hungary	2nd	Javelin throw	81.76 m
1967	European Cup Final	Kiev, Soviet Union	4th	Javelin throw	78.40 m
1968	Olympic Games	Mexico City, Mexico	4th	Javelin throw	85.70 m
1969	European Championships	Athens, Greece	8th	Javelin throw	77.48 m
1970	European Cup Final	Stockholm, Sweden	1st	Javelin throw	82.46 m
1971	European Championships	Helsinki, Finland	7th	Javelin throw	80.56 m
