= Pauli Nevala =

Finnish javelin thrower (1940–2025)

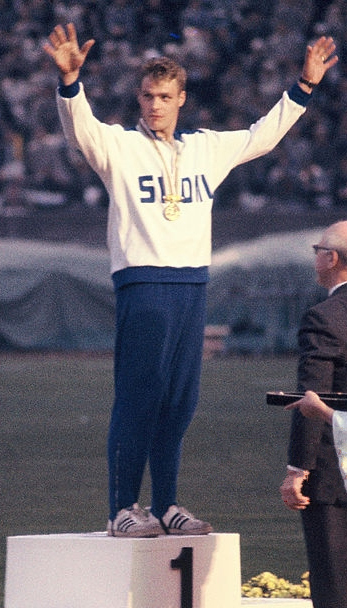
- Nevala at the 1964 Olympics

Personal information
- Full name: Pauli Lauri Nevala
- Born: 30 November 1940 Pohja, Finland
- Died: 20 June 2025 (aged 84)
- Height: 1.77 m (5 ft 10 in)
- Weight: 78–88 kg (172–194 lb)

Sport
- Sport: Javelin throw
- Club: Teuvan Rivakka, Teuva
Medal record
Men's athletics
Representing Finland
Olympic Games
Gold medal – first place	1964 Tokyo	Javelin throw
European Championships
Silver medal – second place	1969 Athens	Javelin throw

Pauli Lauri Nevala (30 November 1940 – 20 June 2025) was a Finnish javelin thrower.

== Biography ==
His first major international meet was the 1962 European Athletics Championships in Belgrade, where he went out in the qualification round. The next year saw him step up to the very upper echelon of javelin throwers with his new personal best (and national record) of 86.33 meters, thrown in Helsinki on 16 July 1963. This was very close to the world record at the time (86.74 m).

In the Olympic year 1964 however, Nevala had major problems even breaking 80 meters and did not enter the Tokyo Olympics as a favorite. He cleared the Olympic qualification quite easily while the world record holder, Terje Pedersen of Norway, was knocked out – the first man not to qualify. In the final Nevala threw confidently from the start, and took the lead with his fourth throw of 82.66 m, his best that year. This was eventually enough for a victory, narrowly ahead of Gergely Kulcsár.

After the Olympics Nevala's career stagnated. He finished fourth at the 1966 European Athletics Championships in Budapest. His attempt to defend his Olympic title at the 1968 Summer Olympics was cut short in the qualification as his longest throw was controversially declared flat and he failed to advance to the final.

In 1969, Nevala's career had a major resurgence, as he finally broke his six-year-old personal best multiple times, culminating in a 91.40 m throw in his hometown of Teuva. At the 1969 European Championships, Nevala took the silver medal behind Jānis Lūsis of the Soviet Union. Nevala later openly attributed this resurgence to anabolic steroids, which were not yet forbidden at the time.

In 1970, Nevala was arguably the best javelin thrower in the world winning 50 out of his 55 competitions. He threw over 90 meters in 5 competitions, over 85 meters in 32 competitions, and over 80 meters in 52 competitions. His top 10 average of the season was 90.12 m and all-season average 85.86 m. Nevala's personal best of 92.64 m in Helsinki on 6 September 1970 landed only 6 cm short of Jorma Kinnunen’s world record. In addition to the world's best performance of the year, Nevala was ranked as the number one javelin thrower in the world by Track & Field News.

Nevala and Kinnunen intentionally fouled all their qualification throws at the 1970 Finnish Championships as a protest against the Finnish Amateur Athletic Association. The protest eventually led to an improved stipend system.

Nevala's career suddenly ended in April 1971 when, in his very first competition of the year in Abidjan, Côte d'Ivoire, he injured his shoulder so badly he could never throw seriously again.

Pauli Nevala died on 20 June 2025, at the age of 84.
