= Sándor Krasznai =

Sándor Krasznai (also known as Sándor Krämer; 14 December 1932 – 30 March 2009) was a Hungarian athlete, engineer and constructor.

Born in Újpest, he graduated from the Budapest University of Technology and Economics. One of the leading javelin throwers in the 1950s in Hungary, he designed his own javelins with them he won six national titles (1953–57, 1961). In 1955 he broke the Hungarian record twice, improving it to 78.04 metres.

A year later he was present at the Summer Olympics in Melbourne. He passed the 66 metres qualifying limit with his second throw in the qualifying round (67.39) and advanced to the final on the fifteenth place. In the final round he moved up to places to come thirteenth with a 66.33 metres throw.

After his retirement from professional sport, Krasznai took a coaching position by Újpesti Dózsa. He trained among others Sándor Boros, Viktória Fekete and Zsuzsa Malovecz, all of whom became Hungarian champions in javelin throw. From 1957 Krasznai worked for electronics manufacturer Tungsram, first as design engineer and later as main constructor. In 1990 he contributed to the development of a Miklós Németh designed javelin, the Flying Fantasy. He died in March 2009, aged 77.
