= Ivan Sivoplyasov =

Soviet javelin thrower

Personal information
- Nationality: Soviet
- Born: 2 March 1931 Novosibirsk, Soviet Union

Sport
- Sport: Athletics
- Event: Javelin throw

Ivan Sivoplyasov (born 2 March 1931) is a Soviet athlete. He competed in the men's javelin throw at the 1960 Summer Olympics.
