= Janusz Sidło =

Polish javelin thrower

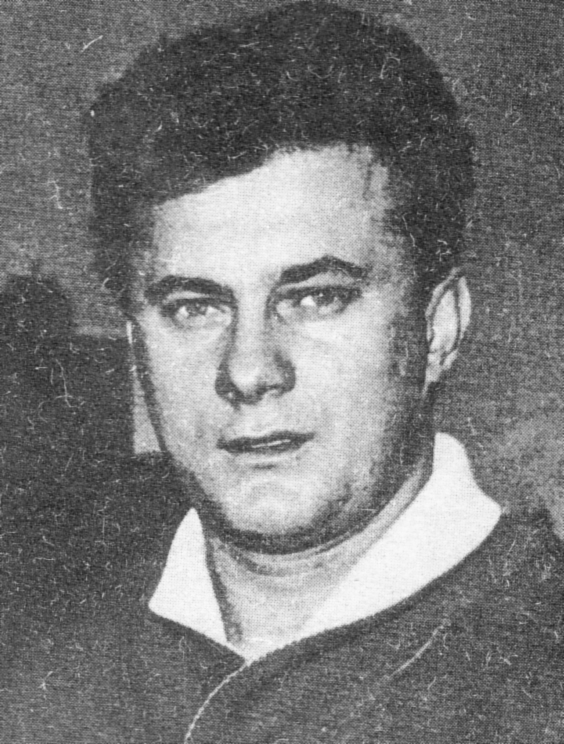
- Janusz Sidlo in 1974

Personal information
- Born: 19 June 1933 Katowice, Poland
- Died: 2 August 1993 (aged 60) Warsaw, Poland
- Height: 1.82 m (6 ft 0 in)
- Weight: 93 kg (205 lb)

Sport
- Sport: Athletics
- Event: Javelin throw
- Club: Baildon Katowice, Spójnia Gdańsk, Spójnia Warszawa

Achievements and titles
- Personal best: 86.22 m (1970)
Medal record
Men's athletics
Representing Poland
Olympic Games
| Silver medal – second place | 1956 Melbourne | Javelin throw |
European Championships
| Gold medal – first place | 1954 Bern | Javelin throw |
| Gold medal – first place | 1958 Stockholm | Javelin throw |
| Bronze medal – third place | 1969 Athens | Javelin throw |
Summer Universiade
| Silver medal – second place | 1961 Sofia | Javelin throw |

Janusz Jan Sidło (19 June 1933 – 2 August 1993) was a Polish javelin thrower. He competed at the 1952, 1956, 1960, 1964, and 1968 Olympics and finished in 18th, 2nd, 8th, 4th and 7th place, respectively. He was awarded the Officer's Cross of the Order of Polonia Restituta and later the Knight's Cross. During his long career Sidło won 14 national titles and competed in five European Championships (1954, 1958, 1962, 1966, and 1969), winning them in 1954 and 1958 and medalling in 1969.

In 1954 and 1955, he was chosen the Polish Sportspersonality of the Year.

In October 1953, Sidło set a new European javelin record at 80.15 m in Jena. In June 1956, he set a world record at the 83.66 m in Milan. He went to the 1956 Summer Olympics as a favourite, and was equipped with a modern javelin made of steel, while most of his competitors still used wooden ones. Sidło led the competition with a throw of 79.98 m, but then lent his javelin to his poorly performing friend, Egil Danielsen from Norway. Danielsen set a new world record at 85.71 m and won the gold medal.

== International competitions ==
| Year | Competition | Venue | Position | Notes |
Representing Poland
| 1951 | World Festival of Youth and Students | Berlin, East Germany | 1st | 66.38 m |
| 1952 | Olympic Games | Helsinki, Finland | 18th (q) | 62.16 m |
| 1953 | World Festival of Youth and Students | Bucharest, Romania | 4th | 68.96 m |
| 1954 | World Student Games | Budapest, Hungary | 1st | 75.24 m |
| 1954 | European Championships | Bern, Switzerland | 1st | 76.35 m |
| 1955 | World Festival of Youth and Students | Warsaw, Poland | 1st | 77.93 m |
| 1956 | Olympic Games | Melbourne, Australia | 2nd | 79.98 m |
| 1957 | World Festival of Youth and Students | Moscow, Soviet Union | 1st | 80.12 m |
| 1958 | European Championships | Stockholm, Sweden | 1st | 80.18 m |
| 1959 | World Festival of Youth and Students | Vienna, Austria | 1st | 76.53 m |
| 1960 | Olympic Games | Rome, Italy | 8th | 76.46 m |
| 1961 | Universiade | Sofia, Bulgaria | 2nd | 77.48 m |
| 1962 | World Festival of Youth and Students | Helsinki, Finland | 2nd | 72.59 m |
| 1962 | European Championships | Belgrade, Yugoslavia | 7th | 75.01 m |
| 1964 | Olympic Games | Tokyo, Japan | 4th | 80.17 m |
| 1966 | European Championships | Budapest, Hungary | 7th | 78.86 m |
| 1968 | Olympic Games | Mexico City, Mexico | 7th | 80.58 m |
| 1969 | European Championships | Athens, Greece | 3rd | 82.90 m |
