= Jānis Doniņš =

Latvian-American javelin thrower

Personal information
- Born: 20 April 1946 (age 80) Kuldīga, Latvian SSR, Soviet Union

Sport
- Sport: Track and field
Medal record
Representing Soviet Union
European Championships
Silver medal – second place	1971 Helsinki	Javelin throw

Jānis Doniņš (born 20 April 1946) is a Latvian-American former javelin thrower. Competing for the Soviet Union, he won the silver medal at the 1971 European Athletics Championships behind Jānis Lūsis.

== Career ==
Doniņš placed sixth in the javelin throw at the 1969 European Championships in Athens with a throw 79.10 m (259 ft 6 in). He won his event at the 1971 United States vs. Soviet Union dual meet in Berkeley, California with 89.33 m (293 ft 1 in), a meeting record and his personal best. At the European Championships later that year in Helsinki he threw 85.30 m (279 ft 10 in) and placed second behind his teammate Jānis Lūsis.

Track & Field News ranked Doniņš tenth in the world in 1969 and second in 1971. He was one of the favorites for the 1972 Summer Olympics in Munich, but suffered a career-ending knee injury in training in February 1972.

== Personal life ==
Doniņš met Kathy Keefe, an American, on a competition trip to the United States in 1969. They married in 1972 and lived in the Soviet Union until 1974, when she left for America with their daughter. Soviet authorities didn't allow Doniņš to leave with them at the time, but they relented in 1975 and he rejoined his family in California.
