= Erich Ahrendt =

German javelin thrower

Personal information
- Nationality: German
- Born: 29 July 1933 Altwriezen, Province of Brandenburg, Germany
- Died: 27 July 2009 (aged 75)

Sport
- Sport: Athletics
- Event: Javelin throw

Erich Ahrendt (29 July 1933 – 27 July 2009) was a German athlete. He competed in the men's javelin throw at the 1960 Summer Olympics.
