= Park Soo-kwon =

South Korean javelin thrower

Personal information
- Nationality: South Korean
- Born: 28 January 1941 (age 84)

Sport
- Sport: Athletics
- Event: Javelin throw

Park Soo-kwon (born 28 January 1941) is a South Korean athlete. He competed in the men's javelin throw at the 1964 Summer Olympics.
