= Salah Majid =

Iraqi javelin thrower

Personal information
- Nationality: Iraqi
- Born: 1932 (age 93–94) Baghdad
- Height: 176 cm (5 ft 9 in)
- Weight: 72 kg (159 lb)

Sport
- Country: Iraq
- Sport: Javelin throw

Achievements and titles
- Personal best: 72.08

Salah Majid (born 1932) is an Iraqi Olympic javelin thrower. He represented his country in the men's javelin throw at the 1960 Summer Olympics. His distance was a 57.32 in the qualifiers.
