= Benjamin Garcia (athlete) =

American javelin thrower

Benjamin Benito Garcia (July 31, 1933 – February 13, 2015 (aged 81)) was an American track and field athlete, known for participating in the javelin throw. He competed for the United States in the 1956 Olympics. He threw 71.17m in the qualifying round to make the final. That mark would have been good enough for eighth place had it been in the final round (better than the other Americans in the field) but Garcia was unable to land a legal throw in the final round and finished officially in 15th place with no mark.

He began his collegiate career on a football scholarship to New Mexico A&M but switched to Arizona State University where he was elected Most Valuable Player on the track team in 1955. He was born in La Luz, New Mexico and died in Phoenix, Arizona.
