= Walter Krüger (athlete) =

East German javelin thrower

Olympic medal record

Men's athletics

Representing Germany
Silver medal – second place	1960 Rome	Javelin throw

Walter Krüger (11 April 1930 – 28 October 2018) was an East German athlete who competed mainly in the javelin throw. He was born in Altenpleen, Pomerania. He competed for the United Team of Germany in the 1960 Summer Olympics held in Rome, Italy in the javelin throw where he won the silver medal.

He became East German champion in the javelin throw in 1960, having earlier won the bronze medal in 1958, representing the club SC Traktor Schwerin.
