= Rolf Bühler =

Swiss javelin thrower (1942–2025)

Personal information
- Full name: Rolf Andreas Theodor Bühler
- Nationality: Swiss
- Born: 29 December 1942 Uzwil, Switzerland
- Died: 29 May 2025 (aged 82)

Sport
- Sport: Athletics
- Event: Javelin throw

Rolf Andreas Theodor Bühler (29 December 1942 – 29 May 2025) was a Swiss athlete. He competed in the men's javelin throw at the 1968 Summer Olympics.

Bühler died on 29 May 2025, at the age of 82.
