= Baltic Summer Academy =

Baltic Summer Academy on International Humanitarian Law is organised every summer by Lithuanian, Latvian and Estonian Red Cross National Societies and International Committee of the Red Cross (ICRC) Regional Delegation for Central Europe. The Academy is meant for students of law, international relations and political science and military academies from the Baltic states. The tendency in recent years is that students also from other countries join the event. In addition to the participants from the Baltic states, there were students from Austria, Czech Republic, Finland, Hungary and Poland.

== Goal and objectives of the Academy ==
Goal of the event is to disseminate international humanitarian law among scholars in the Baltic states.

== Objectives ==
- To improve knowledge of International Humanitarian Law among participating university students.
- To encourage co-operation of professors and practitioners of the region with the Red Cross societies in the field of IHL dissemination.
- To turn public opinion to humanitarian problems and to build up visibility of humanitarian organisations on the national and regional level.

== Program ==
1. Lectures, case studies and discussions.
2. Evening programs suggested by organisers and by participating students themselves.

== Participants ==
Priority for students of law, international relations, political sciences and military academies. Also young practitioners are invited.
