= John FitzSimons =

British javelin thrower and track and field athlete

Personal information
- Nationality: British (English)
- Born: 12 February 1943 (age 83) Abingdon-on-Thames, England

Sport
- Sport: Athletics
- Event: javelin throw
- Club: St Marys College AC; Polytechnic Harriers
Medal record
Representing England
Commonwealth Games
Gold medal – first place	1966 Kingston	Javelin throw
Bronze medal – third place	1970 Edinburgh	Javelin throw

John Henry FitzSimons (born 12 February 1943) is a British former track and field athlete who competed in the javelin throw and was a gold medallist at the Commonwealth Games.

== Biography ==
FitzSimons became the British javelin throw champion after winning the British AAA Championships title at the 1964 AAA Championships and was runner-up to Finland's Jorma Kinnunen at the 1966 AAA Championships.

In August of 1966, he represented England at the 1966 British Empire and Commonwealth Games, winning the gold medal with a games record throw of 79.78 m (261 ft 8 3/4 in).

He is a former British record holder and was the first British man to throw the javelin beyond eighty metres. His personal best is 81.92 m (268 ft 9 in).

As well as his 1966 gold, he returned to win a bronze medal at the 1970 British Commonwealth Games, helping England to the first ever medal sweep of the javelin by a nation, alongside compatriots Dave Travis and John McSorley. He represented Great Britain at the 1966 European Athletics Championships but ranked only 22nd overall.

He also played minor counties cricket for Berkshire from 1960–1962, making eight appearances in the Minor Counties Championship.

== International competitions ==
Year	Competition	Venue	Position	Notes
1966	British Empire and Commonwealth Games	Kingston, Jamaica	1st	79.78 m GR
1966	European Championships	Budapest, Hungary	22nd	68.86 m
1970	British Commonwealth Games	Edinburgh, United Kingdom	3rd	73.20 m
