= Heiner Will =

German javelin thrower

Personal information
- Nationality: German
- Born: 22 October 1926 Reichenow-Möglin, Germany
- Died: 18 October 2009 (aged 82) Rendsburg, Germany

Sport
- Sport: Athletics
- Event: Javelin throw

Heiner Will (22 October 1926 – 18 October 2009) was a German athlete. He competed in the men's javelin throw at the 1956 Summer Olympics.
