= Alkis Pierrakos =

Greek painter

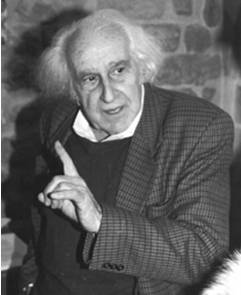
Alkis Pierrakos in February 2004 during the expo "Regard sur l'oeuvre de Pierrakos" in Paris

Alkis Pierrakos (Greek: Άλκης Πιερράκος; 1920-2017) was a distinguished Greek painter, known for his contributions to modern European painting.

== Biography ==
Born in Thessaloniki in 1920, Pierrakos spent his childhood and teenage years in Yugoslavia before returning to Greece in 1938. He began painting in 1936 without formal education. Pierrakos studied painting at the Gewerbeschule in Basel, Switzerland, and later at the Slade School of Fine Art and the Central School of Arts and Crafts in London. During his time in London, he apprenticed under the significant expressionist painter Oskar Kokoschka. In 1954, he permanently settled in Paris, where he remained active in the art scene and regularly presented his work in Greece.

His work reflects influences from German expressionism, Wassily Kandinsky's watercolors, and the abstract tendencies of the 1950s. Pierrakos was known for combining emotional use of color with disciplined design organization in his compositions, oscillating between representational and abstract art. He was a founding member of the group "La Ligne et le Signe" in Paris and actively participated in the artistic ferment of his era.

Pierrakos held numerous solo exhibitions, mainly in France and Greece, and participated in group exhibitions across Europe and America. His work was showcased in retrospective exhibitions in Greece in 1997, 2003, and 2007. In 1995, the Association pour la Promotion de l’ Oeuvre d’ A. Pierrakos was established in Paris to promote his work.

== Artistic style and work ==
Alkis Pierrakos' artistic style is marked by a profound ability to highlight color, with color remaining the dominant element in his art. His works, influenced by stimuli and experiences from Central Europe and the Mediterranean, often transform landscapes, buildings, and human figures into images of psychological intensity. By the end of the 1950s, Pierrakos had moved away from representational painting, yet he continued to draw his themes from reality, balancing between representational and abstract art. His paintings are characterized by explosive colors spread across large areas of the canvas and a vigorous design.

After 1970, Pierrakos' painting evolved towards abstract expressionism, emphasizing large surfaces and stark contrasts. This shift is evident in his dynamic use of space, which became a distinctive feature of his work. The voluptuous female nude is a predominant subject in his painting, portrayed without any attempt at beautification. These elements collectively define Pierrakos' unique approach, blending emotional color use with disciplined compositional organization.
