= Åke Nilsson (athlete) =

Swedish javelin thrower

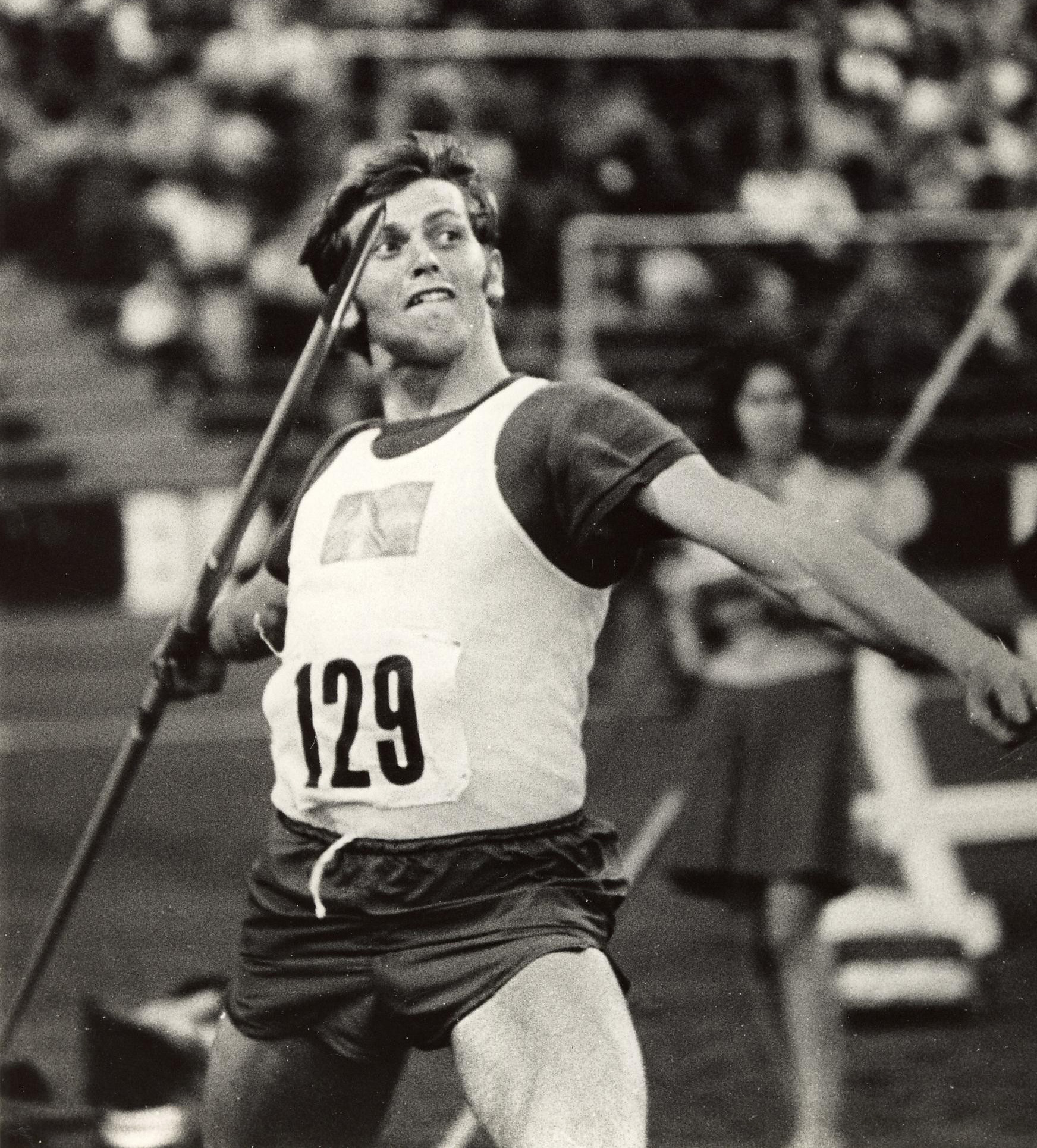

Personal information
- Born: 29 April 1945 (age 81) Bollnäs, Sweden
- Height: 186 cm (6 ft 1 in)
- Weight: 89 kg (196 lb)

Sport
- Sport: Athletics
- Event: Javelin throw
- Club: Gävle GIK; Turebergs IF; Gefle IF

Achievements and titles
- Personal best: 87.76 m (1968)

Karl Åke Nilsson (born 29 April 1945) is a retired Swedish javelin thrower. In 1968 he won the national title and set a national record at 87.76 m, which ranked him #3 in the world and was enough for an Olympic bronze medal. He threw a mere 83.48 m in the 1968 Olympic final and placed sixth.
