= Hans Schenk (athlete) =

German javelin thrower

Personal information
- Nationality: German
- Born: 1 January 1936 Königsberg, East Prussia, Germany
- Died: 19 January 2006 (aged 70) Leverkusen, Germany

Sport
- Sport: Athletics
- Event: Javelin throw

Hans Schenk (1 January 1936 – 19 January 2006) was a German athlete. He competed in the men's javelin throw at the 1964 Summer Olympics.
