= Michel Macquet =

French javelin thrower and handballer (1932–2002)

Personal information
- Nationality: French
- Born: 3 April 1932 Amiens, France
- Died: 27 October 2002 (aged 70) Le Crotoy, France
- Height: 181 cm (5 ft 11 in)
- Weight: 93 kg (205 lb)

Sport
- Sport: Athletics
- Event: javelin
- Club: Racing Club de France; AS Mantes; Colombes Sports

Michel Macquet (3 April 1932 – 27 October 2002) was a French javelin thrower and handball player. Track & Field News ranked him the world's best javelin thrower in 1961.

== Career ==
Born in Amiens, Macquet was originally a handball player, taking up the javelin in 1949. He won his first national championship title in the javelin in 1953, but his breakthrough years were 1955 and 1956, when he repeatedly improved the French record and entered the international javelin elite. In May 1956 Macquet threw 79.01 m, which was less than three meters short of Bud Held's world record; ahead of the 1956 Olympics he beat Finland's Soini Nikkinen, who had broken the world record in the meantime, in a dual meet between France and Finland. Macquet was considered a potential Olympic medalist, but at the Olympics in Melbourne he only threw 71.84 m and placed seventh.

Macquet first broke 80 metres in 1957, and remained one of the world's top throwers for the next few years, improving his results slowly but steadily. However, he continued to disappoint in major championships; although Track & Field News ranked him in the world's top ten in every year from 1956 to 1961 and in the world's top two three times, he never won a medal at either the Olympics or the European Championships. At the 1958 European Championships in Stockholm he placed fourth with a throw of 75.18 m, only eight centimetres behind bronze medalist Gergely Kulcsár of Hungary. Macquet failed to qualify for the final at the 1960 Olympics in Rome, but was still ranked second in the world that year by Track & Field News. In 1961 Macquet set his personal best, 83.36 m, and was ranked first in the world and won the British AAA Championships title at the 1961 AAA Championships.

After 1961 Macquet was never ranked in the world's top 10 again, but still competed in his third Olympic Games in 1964, again failing to qualify for the final. He won the national javelin title for a tenth and final time in 1965.
