= Viktor Tsybulenko =

Ukrainian javelin thrower

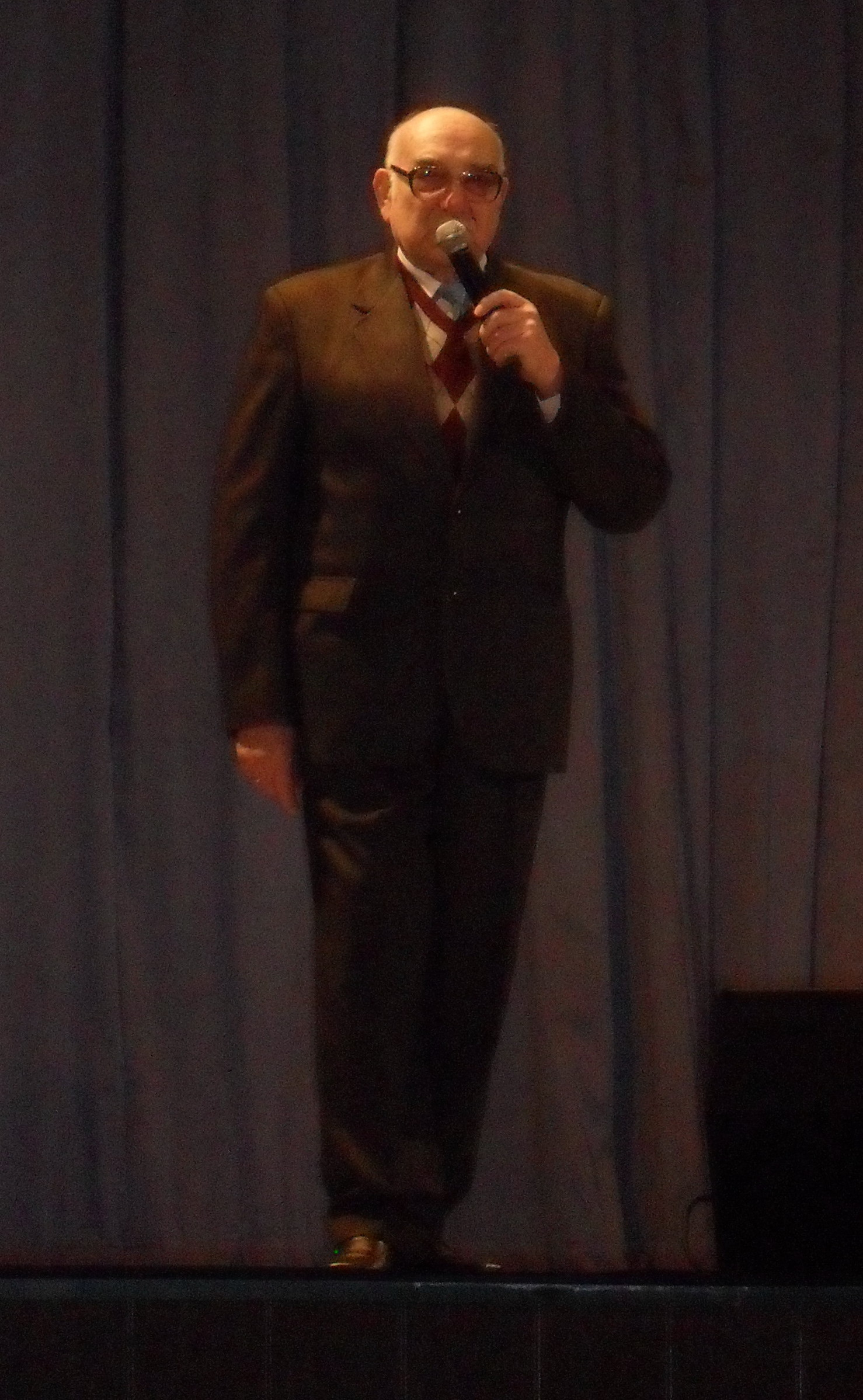
- Viktor Tsybulenko in 2012

Personal information
- Born: 13 July 1930 Vepryk, Kyiv Oblast, Ukrainian SSR, Soviet Union
- Died: 19 October 2013 (aged 83) Kyiv, Ukraine
- Height: 1.88 m (6 ft 2 in)
- Weight: 92 kg (203 lb)

Sport
- Sport: Athletics
- Event: Javelin throw
- Club: SKA, Kyiv

Achievements and titles
- Personal best: 84.64 m (1960)
Medal record
Men's athletics
Representing Soviet Union
Olympic Games
Gold medal – first place	1960 Rome	Javelin throw
Bronze medal – third place	1956 Melbourne	Javelin throw
European Championships
Silver medal – second place	1962 Belgrade	Javelin throw

Viktor Serhiyovych Tsybulenko (Ukrainian: Віктор Сергійович Цибуленко, Russian: Виктор Серге́евич Цыбуленко, 13 July 1930 – 19 October 2013) was a Ukrainian javelin thrower who represented the Soviet Union.

He competed for the Soviet Union at the 1952, 1956 and 1960 Olympics and won a gold medal in 1960 and a bronze in 1956, while finishing fourth in 1952. For these achievements he was awarded the Order of the Red Banner of Labour in 1960 and the Order of the Badge of Honor in 1957.

Tsybulenko was ranked within the world's top 10 javelin throwers in 1952–62, except for 1955; his best placement was second in 1962 and third in 1960. Nationally he won the Soviet title in 1952, 1955–57 and 1959.

After finishing his athletics career Tsybulenko served in the Soviet Army, retiring in 1985 with a rank of colonel. He then returned to the javelin throw and won the 1994 World Masters Championships.

Tsybulenko was born in the village of Vepryk, Fastiv Raion in 1930. In 1931 the father of Viktor, Serhiy Tsybulenko, was "dekulakized" (Dekulakization, a process of personal property being forcefully taken away from peasants by the Soviet state) and in 1933 the Tsybulenko family moved to Kyiv in an attempt to avoid further persecutions. In Vepryk, the Tsybulenko family used to own 20 a (0.49 acres) of land and horses that died in three months following their confiscation and transfer to a collective farm (kolkhoz). When questioned by Viktor why his father did not foresee the outcome of the seizure and join the collective farm, he answered that after being labeled as "kulak", he was unable to do so. Viktor Tsybulenko testified that in 1933 a lot of people died from Holodomor, but his grandma unlike most villagers had a root cellar in her house, which the Soviet prodotryads (food requisitioning detachment) were not aware of and therefore the family could survive.

== See also ==
- Mykola Tsybulenko
