= Egil Danielsen =

Norwegian javelin thrower (1933–2019)

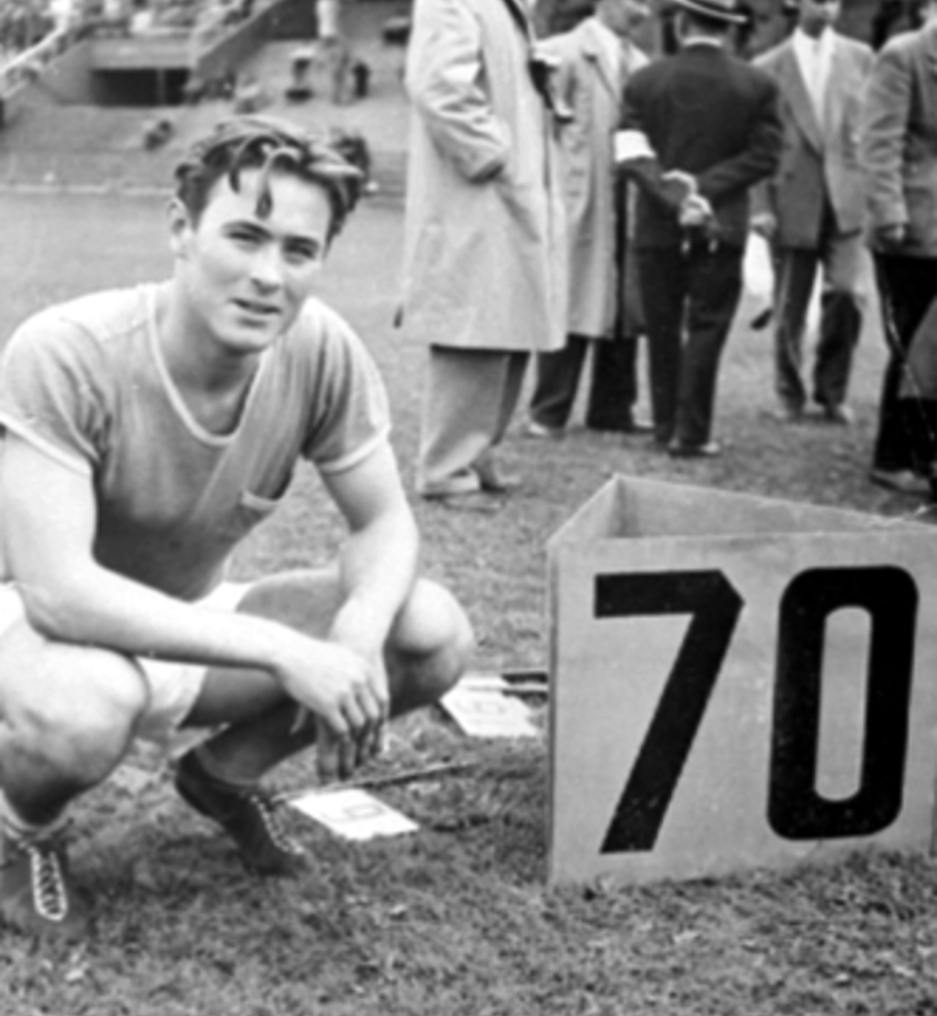
- Danielsen after breaking the 70 m barrier in September 1953

Personal information
- Born: 9 November 1933 Hamar, Norway
- Died: 29 July 2019 (aged 85) Bergen, Norway
- Height: 1.82 m (6 ft 0 in)
- Weight: 88 kg (194 lb)

Sport
- Sport: Athletics
- Event: Javelin throw
- Club: Hamar IL

Achievements and titles
- Personal best: 85.71 m (1956)
Medal record
Men's athletics
Representing Norway
Olympic Games
Gold medal – first place	1956 Melbourne	Javelin throw
European Championships
Silver medal – second place	1958 Stockholm	Javelin throw

Egil Danielsen (9 November 1933 – 29 July 2019) was a Norwegian javelin thrower. He competed at the 1956 and 1960 Olympics and won the gold medal in 1956. Danielsen, who used an old-type wooden javelin, did poorly in the 1956 final, which was led by his Polish friend Janusz Sidło. Trying to help Danielsen, Sidło lent him his modern steel javelin, and Michel Macquet gave him a cup of strong coffee. Danielsen set a new world record at 85.71 m and won the gold medal. He could never reproduce that throw. For his Olympic victory and world record Danielsen was selected Norwegian Sportsperson of the Year in 1956.

Danielsen finished tenth at the 1954 European Championships and won a silver medal in 1958, behind Sidło. He became Norwegian champion in 1953–1957.

Danielsen was an avid cross-country skier before changing to javelin throw. He took fencing lessons from a top Norwegian fencer to improve his flexibility, reflexes and the use of right arm. He retired after the 1960 Olympics and focused on his family and work at the Hamar Fire Brigade. In the 2000s he was a minor political candidate for the Norwegian Pensioner Party.

Preceded by Audun Boysen	Norwegian Sportsperson of the Year; 1956	Succeeded by Magne Lystad
