= Al Cantello =

American javelin thrower (1931–2024)

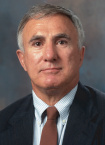

Personal information
- Born: June 9, 1931
- Died: January 17, 2024 (aged 92)
- Occupations: United States Naval Academy cross country and track coach
- Height: 5 ft 7 in (170 cm)
- Weight: 165 lb (75 kg)

Sport
- College team: La Salle University
Medal record
Men's athletics
Pan American Games
| Bronze medal – third place | 1959 Chicago | Javelin |

Albert Anthony Cantello (June 9, 1931 – January 17, 2024) was an American javelin thrower as a member of the United States Marine Corps. He was the coach of the men's distance running program at the United States Naval Academy from 1963 to 2018.

== Biography ==
Cantello graduated from La Salle University in Philadelphia in 1955. While at La Salle, Cantello was twice named to the Track and Field All-American team. He won the javelin contest at four straight Mid-Atlantic Conference Track and Field Championships and three times won the javelin toss at the Penn Relays.

In 1959, he set the world record in the javelin and won the bronze medal at the 1959 Pan American Games and made the US Olympic team for the 1960 Summer Olympics in Rome. Despite having the second longest throw (79.72m) in the games during the qualifying rounds, he finished tenth (with an official throw of 74.7m). Cantello won the AAU title in 1959 and 1960 and held a world ranking of No. 4 for both years. In 1964, Sport magazine named Cantello to its all-time track and field team and voted him the world's greatest competitor in the javelin. He was known for his form, in which he would throw his whole body into the throw and end in a semi-handstand. His personal best throw, with the old javelin type, was 86.04 metres, achieved in June 1959 in Compton.

=== 1960 Summer Olympics ===
In 1959, Cantello (who was serving as a lieutanant in the US Marine Corps) was approached by a US intelligence agent who asked him to facilitate meetings at the upcoming Rome Olympics between agents and potential defectors from Soviet and Eastern Bloc countries. Cantello made an introduction between a CIA agent and Igor Ter-Ovanesyan, a Ukrainian long jumper who had been identified as a potential defector. Ter-Ovanesyan never ended up attempting to defect.

== Coaching career ==
Cantello coached at the United States Naval Academy for more than 50 years where he was named NCAA Mid-Atlantic Coach of the Year three times. He retired in 2018.

In 2013 Cantello was inducted into the U.S. Track & Field and Cross Country Coaches Association (USTFCCCA) Coaches Hall of Fame along with Ron Allice, Dennis Craddock, Jim Hunt, Curtis Frye, and Paul Olsen.

Cantello died on January 17, 2024, at the age of 92.
