= Knut Fredriksson =

Swedish javelin thrower (1930–2019)

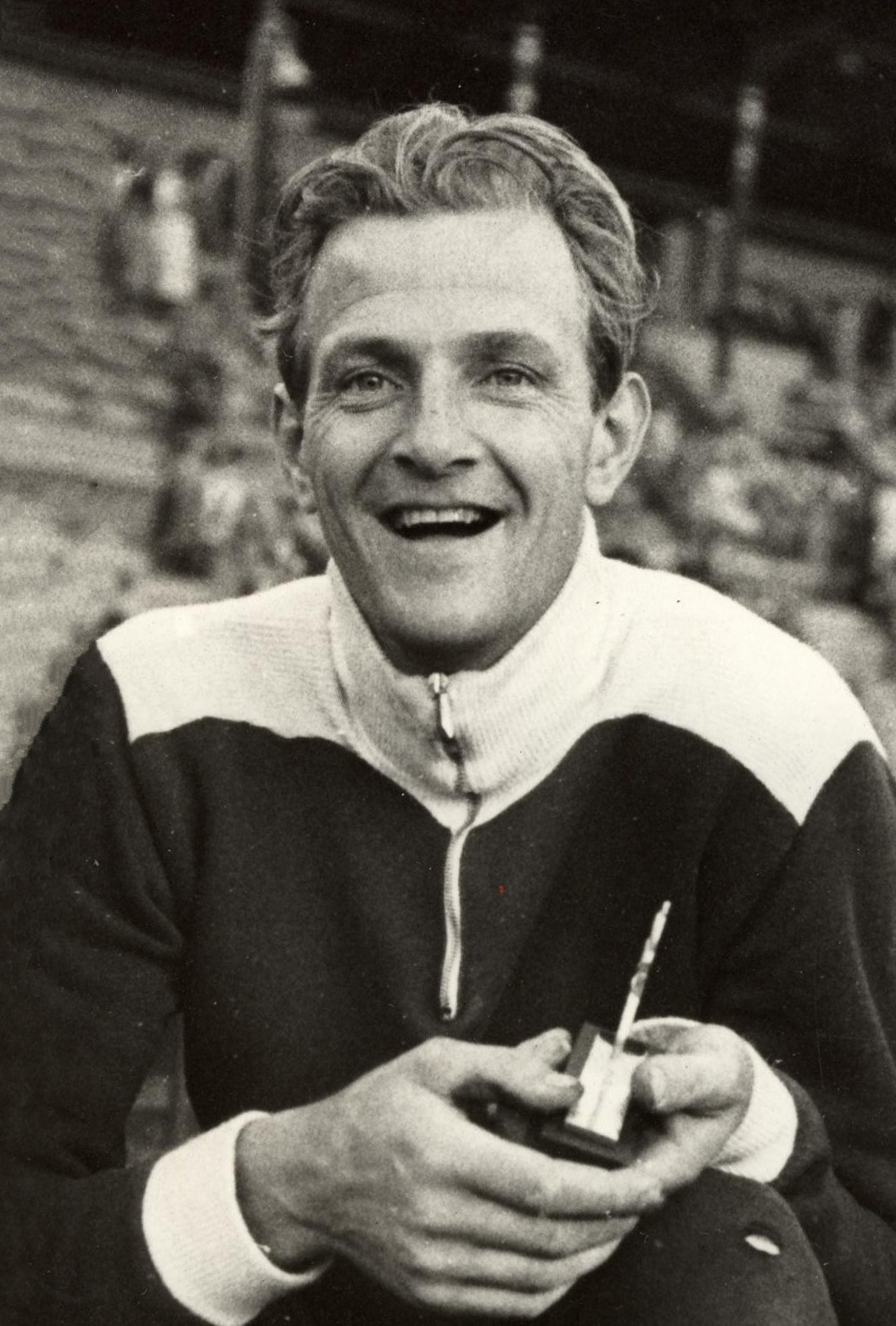

Personal information
- Born: 3 March 1930 Gustavsfors, Bengtsfors, Sweden
- Died: 19 May 2019 (aged 89)
- Height: 1.95 m (6 ft 5 in)
- Weight: 85 kg (187 lb)

Sport
- Sport: Athletics
- Event: Javelin throw
- Club: IK Favör; IF Göta

Achievements and titles
- Personal best: 82.96 m (1959)

Knut Rudolf "Favör-Fredrik" Fredriksson (3 March 1930 – 19 May 2019) was a Swedish javelin thrower. He competed at the 1958 European Athletics Championships and 1960 Summer Olympics and finished in ninth and sixth place, respectively. Fredriksson won the national javelin title in 1954 and 1958–60 and set a new national record in 1959. He was nicknamed Favör-Fredrik after his first club IK Favör.
