= Väinö Kuisma =

Finnish javelin thrower

Personal information
- Nationality: Finnish
- Born: 7 August 1934 Vuoksenranta, Finland
- Died: 18 February 2015 (aged 80) Kouvola, Finland
- Height: 184 cm (6 ft 0 in)
- Weight: 87 kg (192 lb)

Sport
- Sport: Athletics
- Event: Javelin throw
- Club: Kouvolan Urheilijat

Väinö Kuisma (7 August 1934 – 18 February 2015) was a Finnish athlete. He competed in the men's javelin throw at the 1960 Summer Olympics.

Kuisma finished second behind Michel Macquet in the javelin throw event at the British 1961 AAA Championships.
