= Jānis Lūsis =

Latvian javelin thrower (1939–2020)

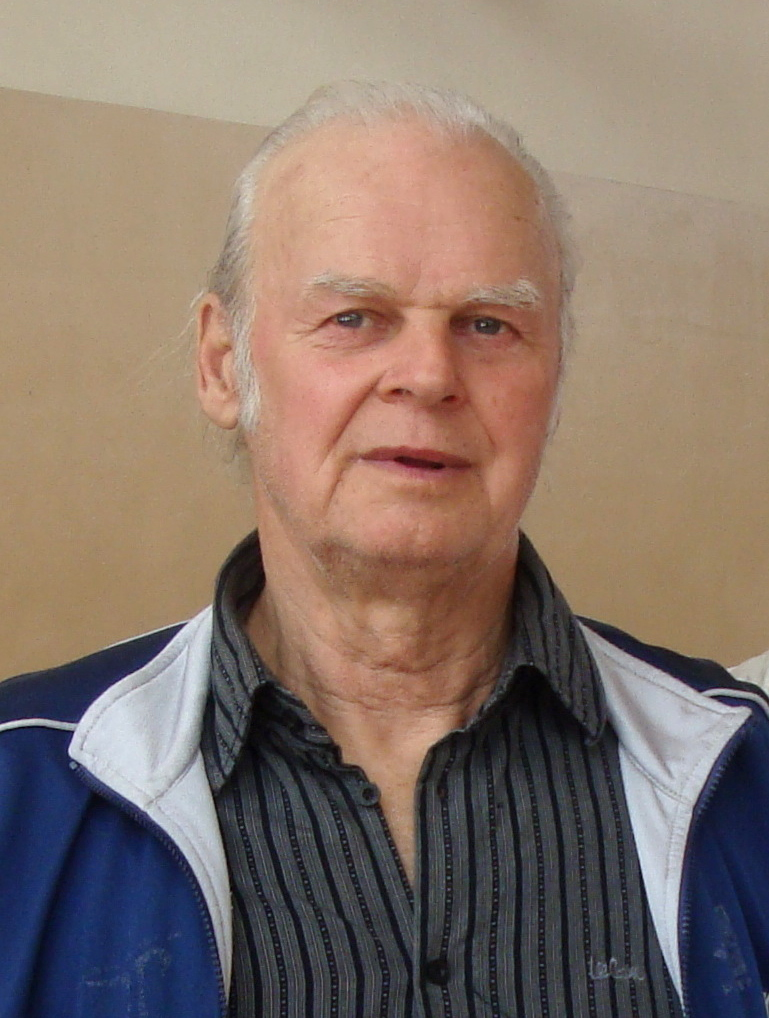
- Lūsis in 2011

Personal information
- Born: 19 May 1939 Jelgava, Latvia
- Died: 29 April 2020 (aged 80) Riga, Latvia
- Height: 180 cm (5 ft 11 in)
- Weight: 90 kg (198 lb)
- Spouse: Elvīra Ozoliņa

Sport
- Country: Soviet Union
- Sport: Athletics
- Event: Javelin throw

Achievements and titles
- Personal best: 93.80 m (1972)
Medal record
Men's Athletics
Representing the Soviet Union
Olympic Games
Gold medal – first place	1968 Mexico City	Javelin
Silver medal – second place	1972 Munich	Javelin
Bronze medal – third place	1964 Tokyo	Javelin
European Championships
Gold medal – first place	1962 Belgrade	Javelin
Gold medal – first place	1966 Budapest	Javelin
Gold medal – first place	1969 Athens	Javelin
Gold medal – first place	1971 Helsinki	Javelin
Universiade
Gold medal – first place	1963 Porto Alegre	Javelin
- Updated on 17 July 2024

Jānis Lūsis (19 May 1939 – 29 April 2020) was a Latvian track and field athlete who competed in javelin throw.

== Biography ==
Lūsis trained at Daugava Voluntary Sports Society and later at Armed Forces sports society. He competed in four Summer Olympics for the USSR team, winning bronze in 1964 Olympics, gold in 1968 Olympics and silver in 1972 Olympics.

The javelin competition at the 1972 Games was the closest in Olympic history. Germany's Klaus Wolfermann had taken the lead from Lūsis in the fifth round with an Olympic Record throw of 90.48 meters. Then, in the sixth and final round, Lūsis let fly with a very long effort that measured at 90.46 meters - Wolfermann's two-centimeter margin was, at the time, the smallest unit of measurement used in javelin competitions.

As of 2020, he remains the only Latvian to have won an all three classes of Olympic medals (gold, silver and bronze) over the span of his career. Lūsis set two world records in javelin throw, of 91.68 m in 1968 and of 93.80 m in 1972. He is also a 4-time European champion. In 1987 IAAF named him the greatest javelin thrower in history.

After Lūsis finished competing, he became an athletics coach. He was married to Elvīra Ozoliņa, the 1960 Olympic female champion in the javelin throw. Their son, Voldemārs Lūsis, is also a javelin thrower who competed in 2000 Summer Olympics and 2004 Summer Olympics.

During the 2009 Latvian Sportspersonality of the year award ceremony, Lūsis received the Lifetime Contribution to Sport award.

In 2014 he was inducted into IAAF Hall of Fame.
