= Christos Pierrakos =

Greek javelin thrower

Personal information
- Nationality: Greek
- Born: 25 January 1940 Skala, Cephalonia, Greece
- Died: January 2019 (aged 78–79)

Sport
- Sport: Athletics
- Event: Javelin throw

Christos Pierrakos (25 January 1940 – January 2019) was a Greek athlete. He competed in the men's javelin throw at the 1964 Summer Olympics. He was named the 1964 Greek Athlete of the Year.
