= Terje Pedersen =

Norwegian javelin thrower

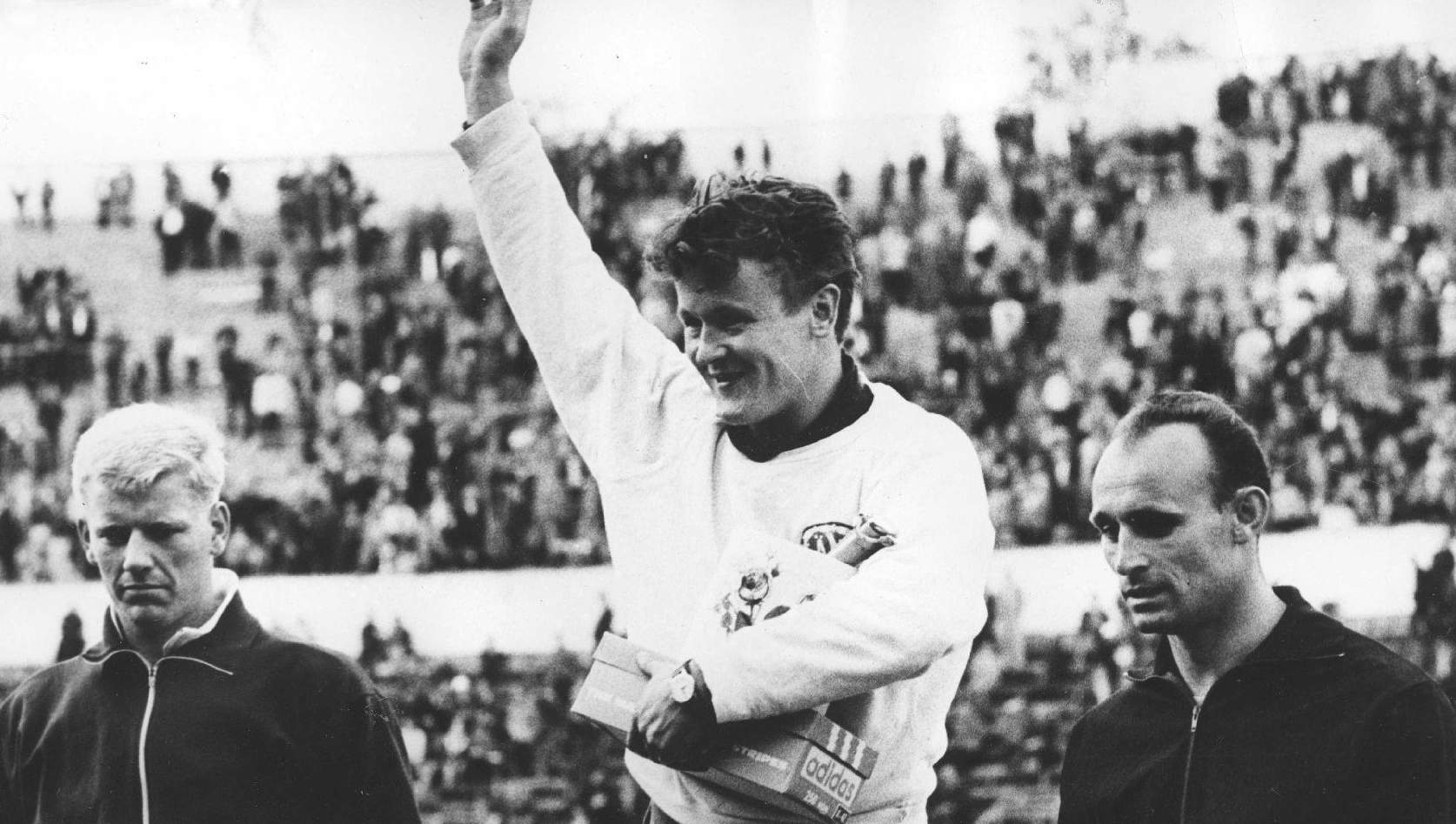
Terje Pedersen, Jorma Kinnunen, Gergely Kulcsár (Helsinki 1965).

Terje Olav Pedersen (born 9 February 1943) is a former Norwegian javelin thrower. He represented SK Vidar.

At the 1960 Summer Olympics he progressed from the qualifying round, but did not start in the final. At the 1964 Summer Olympics he did not qualify for the final. He became Norwegian champion in the years 1960 and 1962–1964.

Pedersen established two world records in javelin throw (with the old implement), both at Bislett stadion. The first record of 87.12 metres came in July 1964 and the second of 91.72 metres was established in September the same year. This remained his career best throw. For his world records Pedersen was selected Norwegian Sportsperson of the Year in 1964.

Preceded by Reidar Hjermstad	Norwegian Sportsperson of the Year; 1964	Succeeded by Per Ivar Moe
