= Manfred Stolle =

German javelin thrower

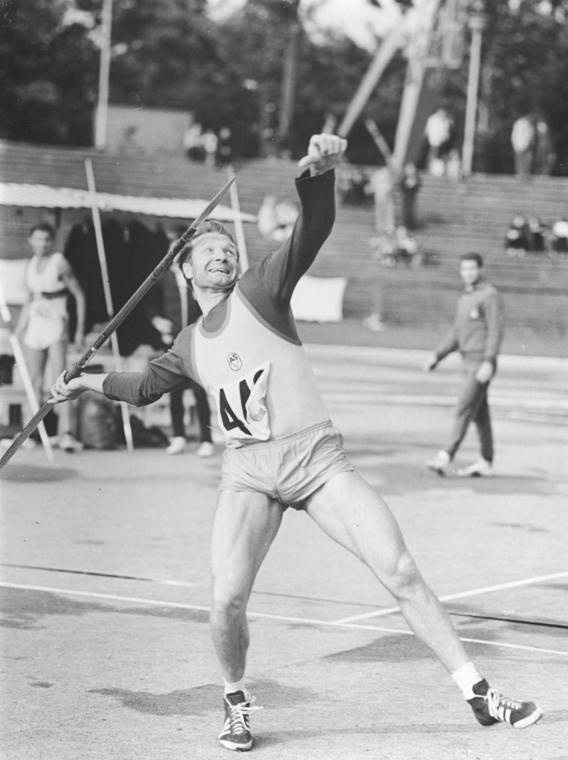
- Manfred Stolle in 1970

Personal information
- Born: March 5, 1937 (age 89) Leipzig, Saxony, Germany
- Height: 1.85 m (6 ft 1 in)
- Weight: 85 kg (187 lb)

Sport
- Country: East Germany
- Sport: Athletics
- Event: Javelin throw
- Club: ASK Vorwärts Potsdam

Achievements and titles
- Personal best: 90.64 m (1970)

Manfred Stolle (born 5 March 1937) is a German former javelin thrower who competed in the 1968 Summer Olympics and in the 1972 Summer Olympics.
