= Urs von Wartburg =

Swiss javelin thrower

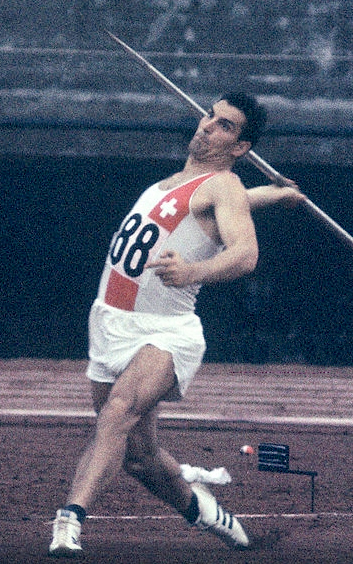
- Urs von Wartburg at the 1964 Olympics

Personal information
- Born: 1 March 1937 (age 89) Wangen bei Olten, Switzerland
- Height: 1.88 m (6 ft 2 in)
- Weight: 100 kg (220 lb)

Sport
- Sport: Javelin throw
- Club: TV Helvetia GE; TV Olten; BTV Aarau

Urs von Wartburg (born 1 March 1937) is a Swiss javelin thrower. He competed at five Olympics between 1960 and 1976 with the best achievement of fifth place in 1964. He is the fourth sportsperson to compete for Switzerland at five Olympics, after middle-distance runner Paul Martin and equestrians Henri Chammartin and Gustav Fischer. After retiring from senior competitions he had a long career in the javelin at European and world masters championships.

== See also ==
- List of athletes with the most appearances at Olympic Games
