= Rolf Herings =

German javelin thrower

Personal information
- Born: 10 July 1940 Mönchengladbach, West Germany
- Died: 29 September 2017 (aged 77) Cologne, Germany

Sport
- Sport: Track and field
Medal record
Representing West Germany
Summer Universiade
Gold medal – first place	1965 Budapest	Javelin throw
Bronze medal – third place	1961 Sofia	Javelin throw

Rolf Herings (10 July 1940 – 29 September 2017) was a German javelin thrower who competed in the 1964 Summer Olympics and in the 1968 Summer Olympics and football coach (1.FC Köln).
