= Jorma Kinnunen =

Finnish athlete (1941–2019)

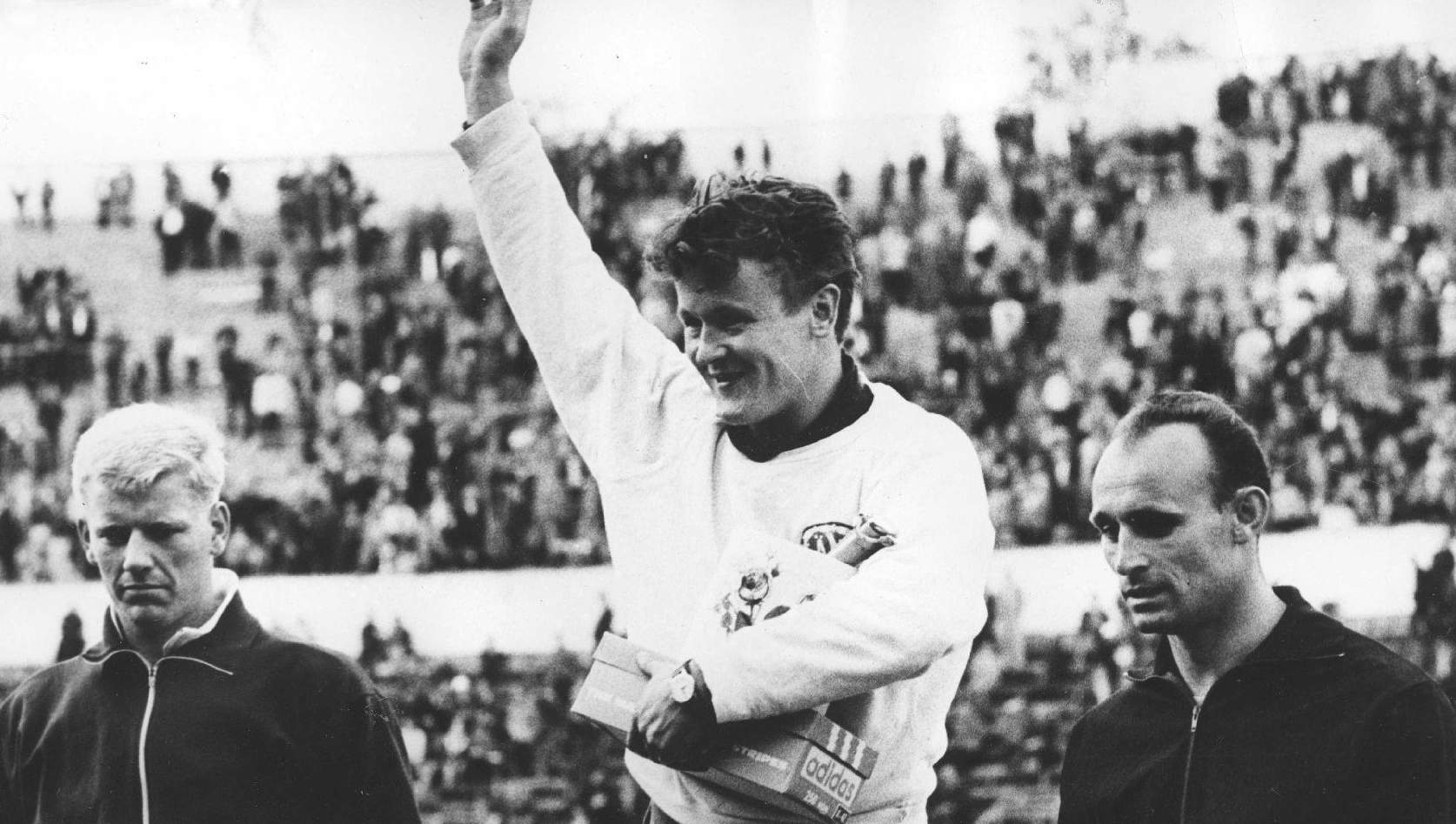
- Terje Pedersen, Jorma Kinnunen, Gergely Kulcsár (Helsinki 1965)

Personal information
- Nationality: Finnish
- Born: 15 December 1941 Pihtipudas, Finland
- Died: 25 July 2019 (aged 78) Äänekoski, Finland
- Height: 175 cm (5 ft 9 in)
- Weight: 75–80 kg (165–176 lb)

Sport
- Sport: Athletics
- Event: Javelin throw
- Club: Äänekosken Urheilijat
Medal record
Representing Finland
Men's Athletics
Olympic Games
Silver medal – second place	1968 Mexico City	Javelin throw

Jorma Vilho Paavali Kinnunen (15 December 1941 – 25 July 2019) was an athlete from Finland who competed mainly in the javelin throw and participated at three Olympic Games.

== Biography ==
Kinnunen was born in Pihtipudas and attended his first Olympic Games in Tokyo during 1964.

Kinnunen won the British AAA Championships title in the javelin throw event at the 1966 AAA Championships.

He competed for Finland in the 1968 Summer Olympics held in Mexico City, Mexico in the javelin throw where he won the silver medal and on 18 June 1969 Kinnunen threw a world record 92.70m in javelin at Tampere stadium, Finland. At the 1972 Olympics Games in Munich, he represented Finland again and finished in 6th place.

Kinnunen was the father of Kimmo Kinnunen, a world champion javelin thrower. He also had a daughter, Sanna Kinnunen, and another son, Jarkko Kinnunen, who died on 23 February 2019.

Kinnunen died after a long illness on 25 July 2019, aged 77.
