= Hermann Salomon =

German athlete (1938–2020)

Personal information
- Nationality: German
- Born: 13 April 1938 Danzig (now Gdańsk, Poland)
- Died: 11 June 2020 (aged 82) Mainz, Germany

Sport
- Country: Germany
- Sport: Athletics
- Event: Javelin

Achievements and titles
- Olympic finals: 1960, 1964, and 1968
Medal record
Representing West Germany
Summer Universiade
Gold medal – first place	1959 Turin	Javelin throw
Silver medal – second place	1959 Turin	Pentathlon
Silver medal – second place	1963 Porto Alegre	Javelin throw

Hermann Salomon (13 April 1938 – 11 June 2020) was a German javelin thrower. He competed in the 1960 Summer Olympics, in the 1964 Summer Olympics, and in the 1968 Summer Olympics.

Born in the Free City of Danzig, Salomon first competed for the German team of Hamburger SV, before moving to USC Mainz when he was 23 years old in 1961.

Salomon's first international success was in Turin at the 1959 Summer Universiade, where he won a gold medal in the javelin and then a silver medal in the pentathlon, he followed this up four year later in Porto Alegre, Brazil at the 1963 Summer Universiade with a silver medal in the javelin.

1960 saw Salomon's first Olympic appearance at Rome, in the javelin throw, where he qualified in ninth place for the final and in the final he finished in 12th place, four years later at the 1964 Summer Olympics in Tokyo he missed out on qualifying by 0.4 metres, but he made up for it in Mexico City at the 1968 Summer Olympics where again he managed to reach the final and finished in 12th place.

Salomon won the national champion title six times in the javelin throw between 1960 and 1968, and was also national champion in the pentathlon five times between 1959 and 1964.

In 1971 Salomon was received the Rudolf Harbig Memorial Award.

After retiring Salomon became a professor in Philology and Sports science and worked at the University of Mainz.
