= Gergely Kulcsár =

Hungarian javelin thrower (1934–2020)

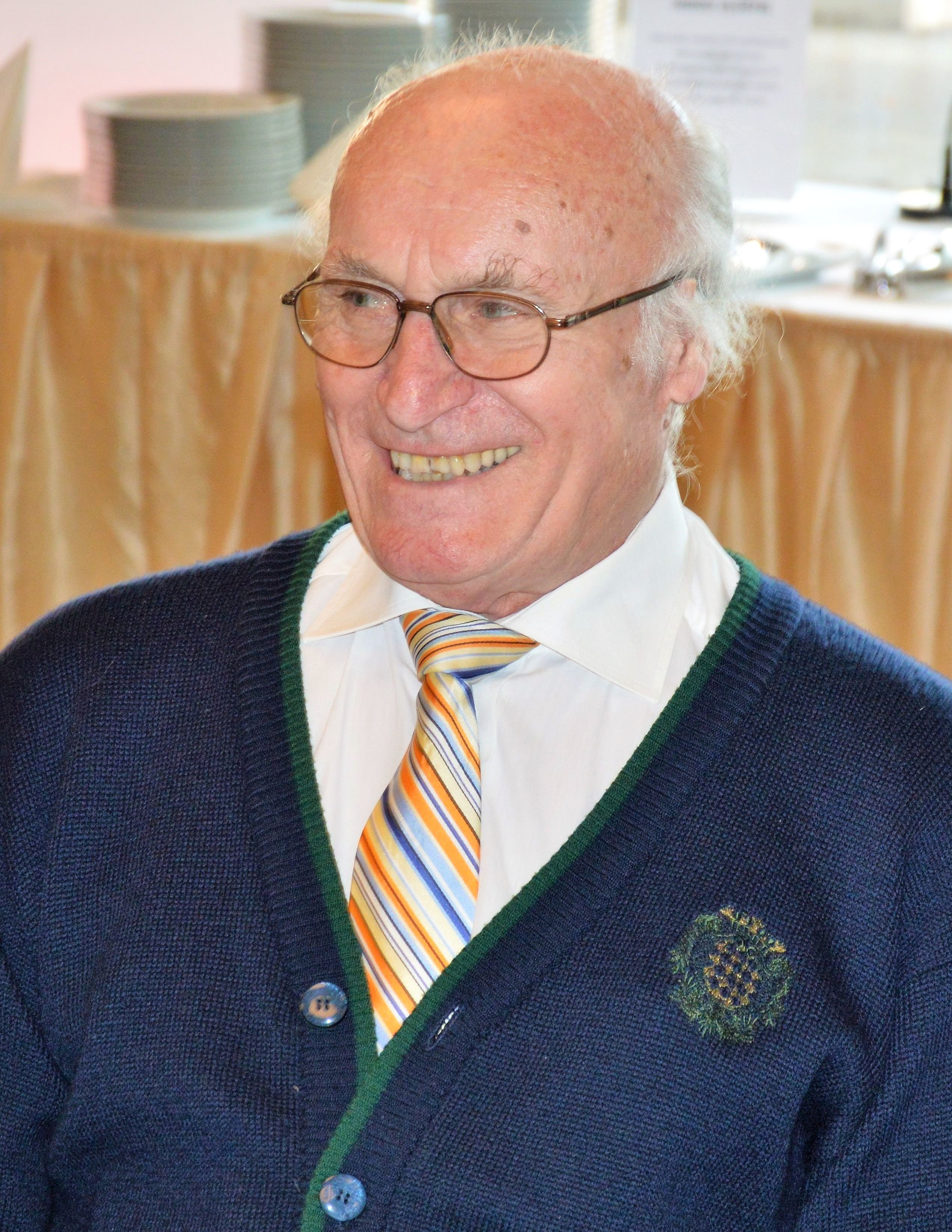
- Kulcsár in 2013

Personal information
- Born: 10 March 1934 Nagyhalász, Hungary
- Died: 12 August 2020 (aged 86) Vác, Hungary
- Height: 1.84 m (6 ft 0 in)
- Weight: 82 kg (181 lb)

Sport
- Sport: Javelin throw
- Club: Építők SC, Budapest; TFSE, Budapest
Medal record
Men's athletics
Representing Hungary
Olympic Games
| Silver medal – second place | 1964 Tokyo | Javelin throw |
| Bronze medal – third place | 1960 Rome | Javelin throw |
| Bronze medal – third place | 1968 Mexico City | Javelin throw |
European Championships
| Bronze medal – third place | 1958 Stockholm | Javelin throw |
| Bronze medal – third place | 1966 Budapest | Javelin throw |
Universiade
| Gold medal – first place | 1961 Sofia | Javelin throw |
| Silver medal – second place | 1959 Turin | Javelin throw |

Gergely Kulcsár (10 March 1934 – 12 August 2020) was a Hungarian javelin thrower. He competed at the 1960, 1964, 1968 and 1972 Olympics and won two bronze medals, in 1960 and 1968, and a silver medal in 1964. He was the Olympic flag bearer for Hungary in 1964, 1968, and 1972.

Kulcsár was the first Hungarian to throw over 80 meters and won the national title eight times. Between 1975 and 1980 he was the coach of the Hungarian national throwing team. His trainees included Miklós Németh, a 1976 Olympic champion. From 1981 to 1993 he coached the national throwing team of Kuwait.
