= Athletics at the 1952 Summer Olympics – Men's javelin throw =

The Men's Javelin Throw event at the 1952 Summer Olympics took place on 24 July at the Helsinki Olympic Stadium.

== Medalists ==
| Gold | Cy Young (USA) |
| Silver | Bill Miller (USA) |
| Bronze | Toivo Hyytiäinen (FIN) |

== Records ==
Standing records prior to the 1952 Summer Olympics
| World Record | Yrjö Nikkanen (FIN) | 78.70 m | October 16, 1938 | Kotka, Finland |
| Olympic Record | Matti Järvinen (FIN) | 72.71 m | August 4, 1932 | Los Angeles, United States |

== Results ==
=== Qualifying round ===
Qualification: Qualifying Performance 64.00 advance to the Final.

| Rank | Group | Athlete | Nationality | Result | Notes |
|---|---|---|---|---|---|
| 1 | A | Toivo Hyytiäinen | Finland | 71.29 | |
| 2 | A | Per-Arne Berglund | Sweden | 71.28 | |
| 3 | B | Viktor Tsybulenko | Soviet Union | 69.42 | |
| 4 | A | Bud Held | United States | 68.62 | |
| 5 | A | Otto Bengtsson | Sweden | 67.58 | |
| 6 | B | Cy Young | United States | 67.26 | |
| 7 | A | Herbert Koschel | Germany | 67.22 | |
| 8 | B | Soini Nikkinen | Finland | 67.15 | |
| 9 | A | Branko Dangubić | Yugoslavia | 66.58 | |
| 10 | A | Ragnar Ericzon | Sweden | 66.68 | |
| 11 | B | Dick Miller | Great Britain | 64.81 | |
| 12 | A | Ricardo Héber | Argentina | 64.82 | |
| 13 | B | Bill Miller | United States | 64.81 | |
| 14 | B | Amos Matteucci | Italy | 64.50 | |
| 15 | A | Eino Leppänen | Finland | 64.47 | |
| 16 | B | Yury Shcherbakov | Soviet Union | 64.39 | |
| 17 | A | Vladimir Kuznetsov | Soviet Union | 64.38 | |
| 18 | B | Janusz Sidło | Poland | 62.16 | |
| 19 | A | Michael Denley | Great Britain | 61.58 | |
| 20 | B | Zbigniew Radziwonowicz | Poland | 61.50 | |
| 21 | B | Halil Zıraman | Turkey | 61.19 | |
| 22 | B | Aristidis Roubanis | Greece | 60.55 | |
| 23 | B | József Várszegi | Hungary | 56.82 | |
| 24 | A | Jalal Khan | Pakistan | 55.56 | |
| 25 | B | Reinaldo Oliver | Puerto Rico | 52.40 | |
| 26 | A | Brígido Iriarte | Venezuela | 52.13 | |
| | A | Pedro Apellániz | Spain | DNS | |

=== Final ===
| Rank | Athlete | Nationality | 1 | 2 | 3 | 4 | 5 | 6 | Result | Notes |
|---|---|---|---|---|---|---|---|---|---|---|
| 1st place, gold medalist(s) | Cy Young | United States | 68.45 | 73.78 | 72.80 | 65.73 | 71.73 | x | 73.78 | OR |
| 2nd place, silver medalist(s) | Bill Miller | United States | 72.46 | 71.65 | 63.95 | 65.41 | 66.97 | 70.45 | 72.46 | |
| 3rd place, bronze medalist(s) | Toivo Hyytiäinen | Finland | 71.89 | 71.24 | 70.25 | 70.00 | 69.55 | 71.16 | 71.89 | |
| 4 | Viktor Tsybulenko | Soviet Union | 71.72 | 70.44 | 66.48 | 71.37 | 66.49 | x | 71.72 | |
| 5 | Branko Dangubić | Yugoslavia | 66.21 | 61.09 | 70.55 | 58.94 | x | | 70.55 | |
| 6 | Vladimir Kuznetsov | Soviet Union | 70.37 | 65.71 | 64.81 | 56.16 | 58.08 | 60.10 | 70.37 | |
| 7 | Ragnar Ericzon | Sweden | 69.04 | 64.55 | 68.02 | | | | 69.04 | |
| 8 | Soini Nikkinen | Finland | 68.80 | 64.08 | 61.58 | | | | 68.80 | |
| 9 | Bud Held | United States | 68.42 | x | x | | | | 68.42 | |
| 10 | Per-Arne Berglund | Sweden | 58.93 | 67.47 | 64.13 | | | | 67.47 | |
| 11 | Otto Bengtsson | Sweden | 65.50 | 63.92 | 64.58 | | | | 65.50 | |
| 12 | Herbert Koschel | Germany | x | 64.54 | 64.06 | | | | 64.54 | |
| 13 | Yury Shcherbakov | Soviet Union | 64.52 | 60.09 | 60.79 | | | | 64.52 | |
| 14 | Dick Miller | Great Britain | x | 63.75 | 59.64 | | | | 63.75 | |
| 15 | Ricardo Héber | Argentina | 60.43 | 62.70 | 62.82 | | | | 62.82 | |
| 16 | Eino Leppänen | Finland | 58.28 | 62.61 | x | | | | 62.61 | |
| 17 | Amos Matteucci | Italy | 59.75 | 61.67 | 61.38 | | | | 61.67 | |
