= 1954 European Athletics Championships – Men's javelin throw =

Men's javelin throw at the European Athletics Championships

The men's javelin throw at the 1954 European Athletics Championships was held in Bern, Switzerland, at Stadion Neufeld on 28 and 29 August 1954.

== Medalists ==
Gold	Janusz Sidło; Poland
Silver	Vladimir Kuznetsov; Soviet Union
Bronze	Soini Nikkinen; Finland

== Results ==
=== Final ===
29 August

Rank	Name	Nationality	Result	Notes
1st place, gold medalist(s)	Janusz Sidło	Poland	76.35	
2nd place, silver medalist(s)	Vladimir Kuznetsov	Soviet Union	74.61	
3rd place, bronze medalist(s)	Soini Nikkinen	Finland	73.38	
4	Viktor Tsybulenko	Soviet Union	72.39	
5	Otto Bengtsson	Sweden	72.38	
6	Gullbrand Sjöström	Sweden	71.98	
7	Zbigniew Radziwonowicz	Poland	69.84	
8	Sándor Krasznai	Hungary	68.45	
9	Toivo Hyytiäinen	Finland	68.24	
10	Egil Danielsen	Norway	67.78	
11	Mirko Vujačić	Yugoslavia	66.53	
12	Herbert Koschel	West Germany	66.28	
13	Francesco Ziggiotti	Italy	65.66	
14	Joop Fikkert	Netherlands	64.70	
15	Gerhard Keller	West Germany	63.89	
16	Milisav Pavlović	Yugoslavia	58.21	

=== Qualification ===
28 August

Rank	Name	Nationality	Result	Notes
1	Soini Nikkinen	Finland	75.06	Q
2	Janusz Sidło	Poland	74.36	Q
3	Gullbrand Sjöström	Sweden	73.49	Q
4	Viktor Tsybulenko	Soviet Union	70.79	Q
5	Vladimir Kuznetsov	Soviet Union	69.86	Q
6	Mirko Vujačić	Yugoslavia	68.98	Q
7	Zbigniew Radziwonowicz	Poland	68.23	Q
8	Egil Danielsen	Norway	68.04	Q
9	Sándor Krasznai	Hungary	66.90	Q
10	Toivo Hyytiäinen	Finland	66.24	Q
11	Gerhard Keller	West Germany	65.85	Q
12	Herbert Koschel	West Germany	65.64	Q
13	Joop Fikkert	Netherlands	64.14	Q
14	Milisav Pavlović	Yugoslavia	63.83	Q
15	Otto Bengtsson	Sweden	63.73	Q
16	Francesco Ziggiotti	Italy	63.00	Q
17	Halil Zıraman	Turkey	59.36	
18	Albert Brunner	Switzerland	57.63	
19	Andrei Demeter	Romania	57.15	
20	Alec Syrowatsky	France	54.48	
21	Gebhard Büchel	Liechtenstein	54.10	

== Participation ==
According to an unofficial count, 21 athletes from 15 countries participated in the event.

- Finland (2)
- France (1)
- Hungary (1)
- Italy (1)
- Liechtenstein (1)
- Netherlands (1)
- Norway (1)
- Poland (2)
- Romania (1)
- Soviet Union (2)
- Sweden (2)
- Switzerland (1)
- Turkey (1)
- West Germany (2)
- Yugoslavia (2)
