= Knislinge Church =

- Knislinge kyrka
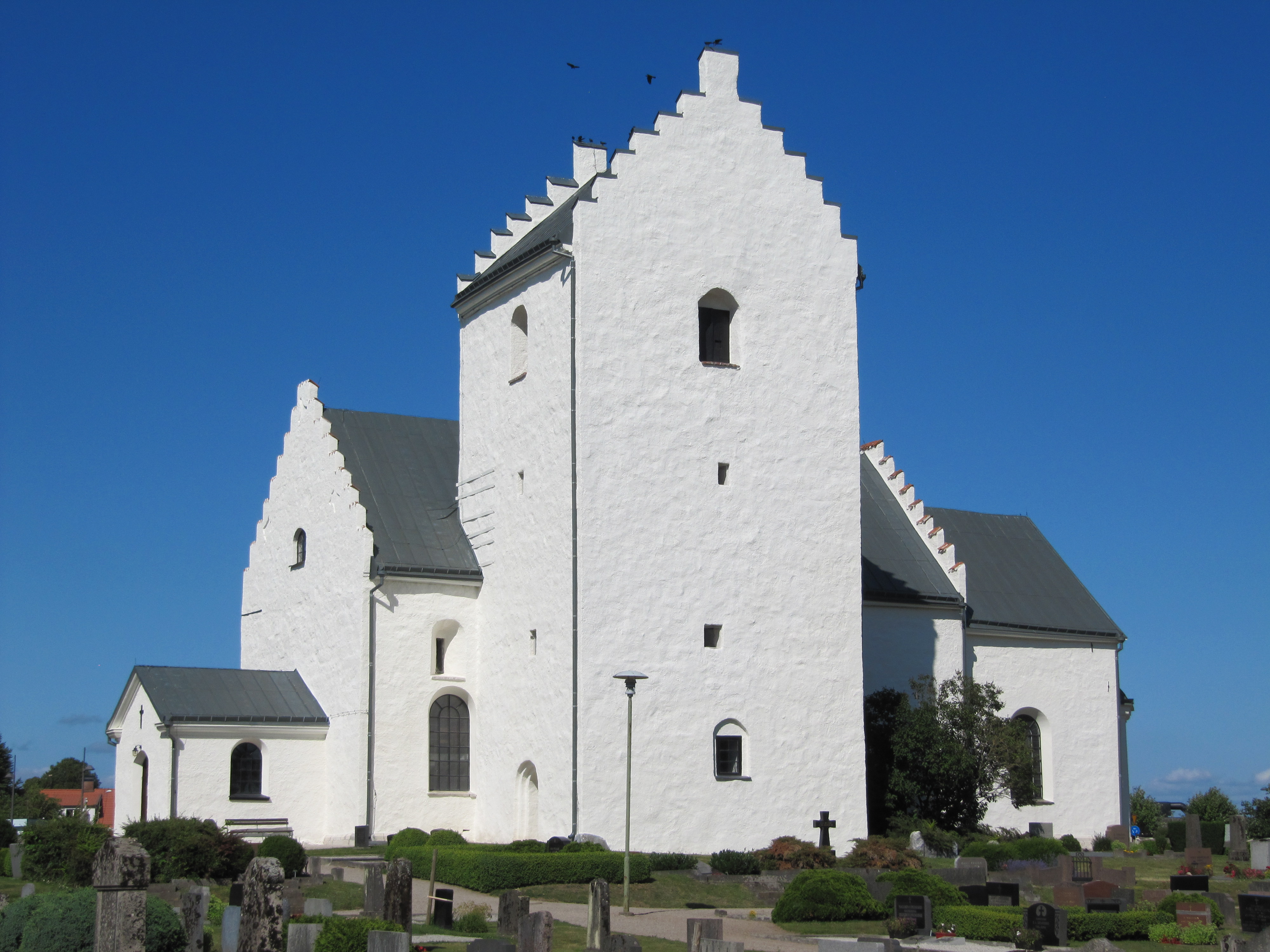
- Knislinge Church

- 56°11′29″N 14°05′06″E
- Country: Sweden
- Denomination: Church of Sweden

Knislinge Church (Swedish: Knislinge kyrka) is a medieval church in Knislinge, Östra Göinge Municipality, in the province of Skåne, Sweden. The church contains several medieval murals as well as a sculpted, Romanesque baptismal font.

== History ==
The church was built in the 1190s and originally consisted of a nave, choir and apse. Several alterations were made to the church already during the Middle Ages. A wide, western tower was built during the 13th century but later reduced in height and transformed into a western expansion of the nave; a new tower was built on the south side of the church in the late Middle Ages. During the 15th century, a church porch was also built and the original ceiling of the church replaced with the presently visible vaults. Further, less substantial alterations were made during the 18th century, and in 1803 the medieval apse was replaced with the present, pentagonal apse which contains the sacristy. The original entrances were walled up in 1843 and a new, western entrance constructed. A western church porch was placed in front of the entrance in 1901.

== Murals ==
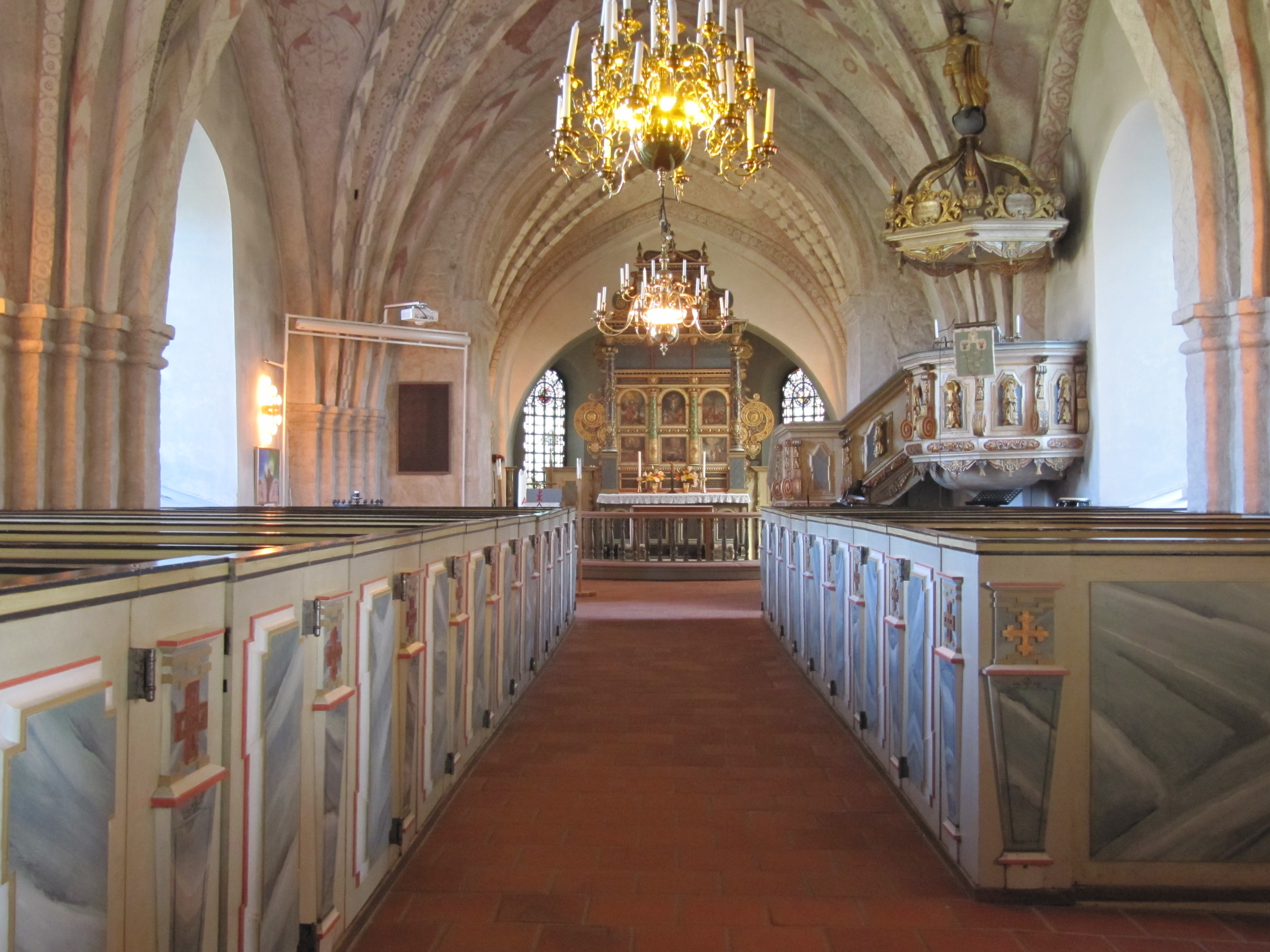
Knislinge Church, interior

The church contains fragments of murals from the earliest building period of the church, concealed above the vaults, as well as on the underside of the arch separating the choir from the nave. The latter are Romanesque in style and depict the Lamb of God flanked by two bishops trampling dragons.

Most of the murals of the church however date from 1460 to 1461 and were made soon after the vaults which they decorate. They were covered with whitewash in the 1720s but were restored in 1924. They were possibly made by Nils Håkansson. They depict religious themes, e.g. Saint George and the Dragon and Saint Nicholas, but also profane subjects.

== Furnishings ==
The church retains its original baptismal font, a decorated Romanesque font made of sandstone. Its basin is roughly octacongal, decorated with eight scenes from the childhood of Christ. The foot is also decorated with two lion heads and one human head. Notable is also the altarpiece a work from the late 16th century, possibly from the workshop of Daniel Tommisen in Malmö. The pulpit is from 1747, made by sculptor Johan Ullberg and considered one of his finest works.
