= Eino Leppänen =

Finnish athlete

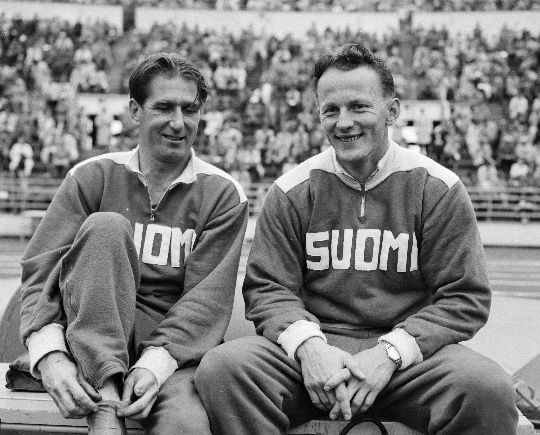
- Leppänen (left) with Toivo Hyytiäinen at the 1952 Helsinki Olympics

Personal information
- Nationality: Finnish
- Born: 18 October 1916 Äänekoski, Finland
- Died: 20 January 1974 (aged 57) Jyväskylä, Finland

Sport
- Sport: Athletics
- Event: Javelin throw

Eino Leppänen (18 October 1916 – 20 January 1974) was a Finnish athlete. He competed in the men's javelin throw at the 1952 Summer Olympics.
