= Hjärsås Church =

- Hjärsås kyrka
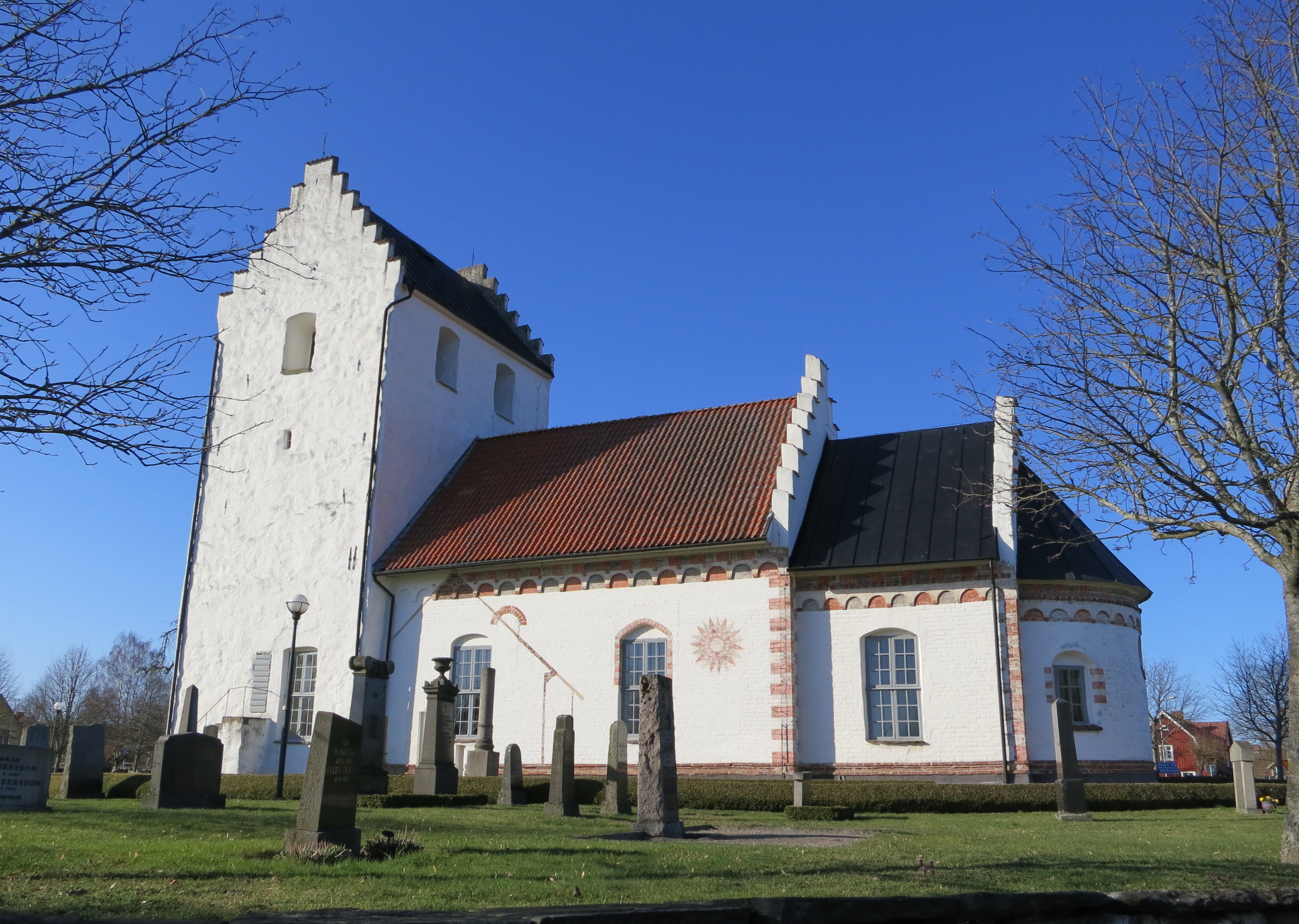
- Hjärsås Church

- 56°12′24″N 14°08′58″E
- Country: Sweden
- Denomination: Church of Sweden

Hjärsås Church (Swedish: Hjärsås kyrka) is a medieval church in Hjärsås, Östra Göinge Municipality, Skåne, Sweden. It was built in the 1230s in a Romanesque style. Unusually, the church exterior is decorated with paintings possibly from the 16th century. The interior contains 16th-century murals of a style not found elsewhere in Skåne. The church lies in the Diocese of Lund (Church of Sweden).

== History ==
A medieval coin dating from the 1230s was found when the church was renovated in 1928, and indicates that the church may have been built c. 1230. It was probably preceded by a wooden church on the same site. The present church originally consisted of the nave, choir and apse, constituting a typically Romanesque edifice. A church porch was built in the 14th century, but demolished in 1870. The church was enlarged during the 15th century, and at that time the interior vaults were also constructed. A fire damaged the church in 1696. A belfry was built in 1703–1704 and the presently visible tower was built in 1773 (but it may have been preceded by a medieval tower). The present windows also date from the 18th century, from 1739. A northern transept was furthermore added in 1796–1797.

== Architecture, murals and fittings ==
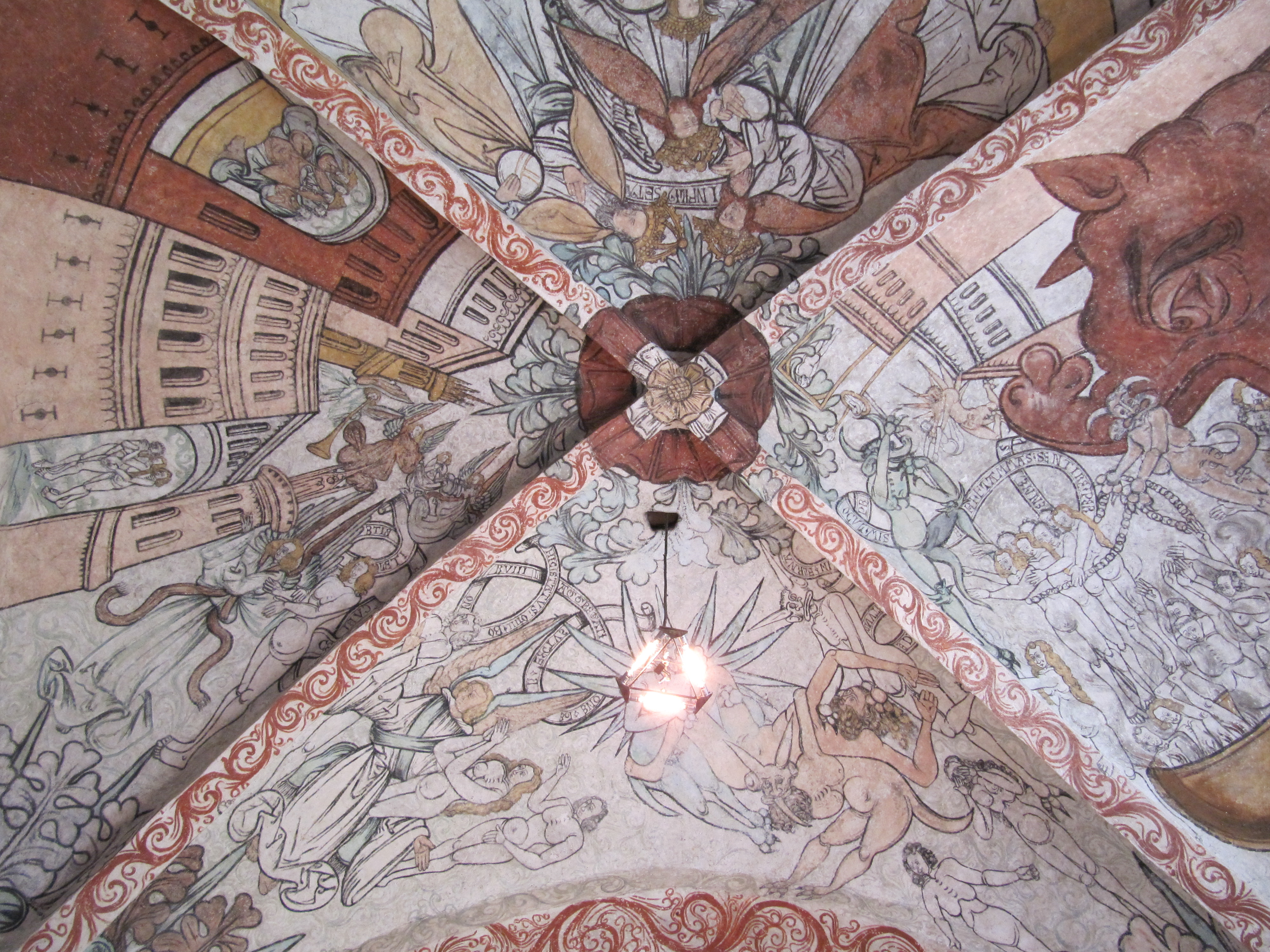
Paintings in the choir vault

The building material of the church is brick, which is unusual for its construction period. Hjärsås Church is the only church in the province of Skåne which retains traces of paint on the facade from decorations made in historical times. The south walls of the nave and choir, as well as the apse, are decorated with ornamental paintings. It is not known when these were made; they might date from the Middle Ages or the 16th century, but they may also be of later date. They were restored in 1939.

Inside, the vaults of the choir and apse are decorated with murals made in the early 16th century and probably no later than 1510. Stylistically these differ from any other medieval murals in the province. They depict similarities to decorations in the church of Mary Magdalene in Djursland, Jutland, as well as those in Nørre Herlev, Zealand and may have been made by either one of the artists decorating these churches. The subjects depicted are visions of Heaven and Hell, including the Last Judgment, and the Trinity with Mary. The depictions show a throng of people and beasts in the narrow space of the vaults.

The pulpit of the church was bought in 1593 and was made by artisan Daniel Thomissen in Malmö. The larger of the two church bells dates from 1703, and the smaller one from 1748. The still present furniture of the sacristy was donated by a priest to the church in 1735. During the 19th century, a new altarpiece was installed (1840). In 1888 the church organ was installed and the pulpit repainted.
