= Dick Miller (athlete) =

British javelin thrower

Personal information
- Nationality: British (Northern Irish)
- Born: 14 February 1929 Reading, England
- Died: 7 January 2021 (aged 91)
- Height: 183 cm (6 ft 0 in)
- Weight: 88 kg (194 lb)

Sport
- Sport: Athletics
- Event: Javelin throw
- Club: London Athletic Club

Richard Dennis William Miller (14 February 1929 – 7 January 2021) was a British athlete who competed at the 1952 Summer Olympics..

== Biography ==
At the 1952 Olympic Games in Helsinki, Finland, Miller competed in the men's javelin throw event.

He finished runner-up behind Michael Denley at the 1952 AAA Championships, which secured his Olympic selection. and was runner-up again behind Colin Smith at the 1963 AAA Championships.

Initially listed as a reserve, he was one of three athletes to be added to the Northern Irish team in September 1962. He subsequently competed at the 1962 British Empire and Commonwealth Games in Perth, Australia, participating in the javelin throw event.
