= Yury Shcherbakov =

Soviet javelin thrower

Personal information
- Nationality: Soviet
- Born: 1925 St Petersburg, Soviet Union
- Died: St Petersburg

Sport
- Sport: Athletics
- Event: Javelin throw

Yury Shcherbakov (born 1925) was a Soviet athlete. He competed in the men's javelin throw at the 1952 Summer Olympics.
