= Broby, Sweden =

Broby
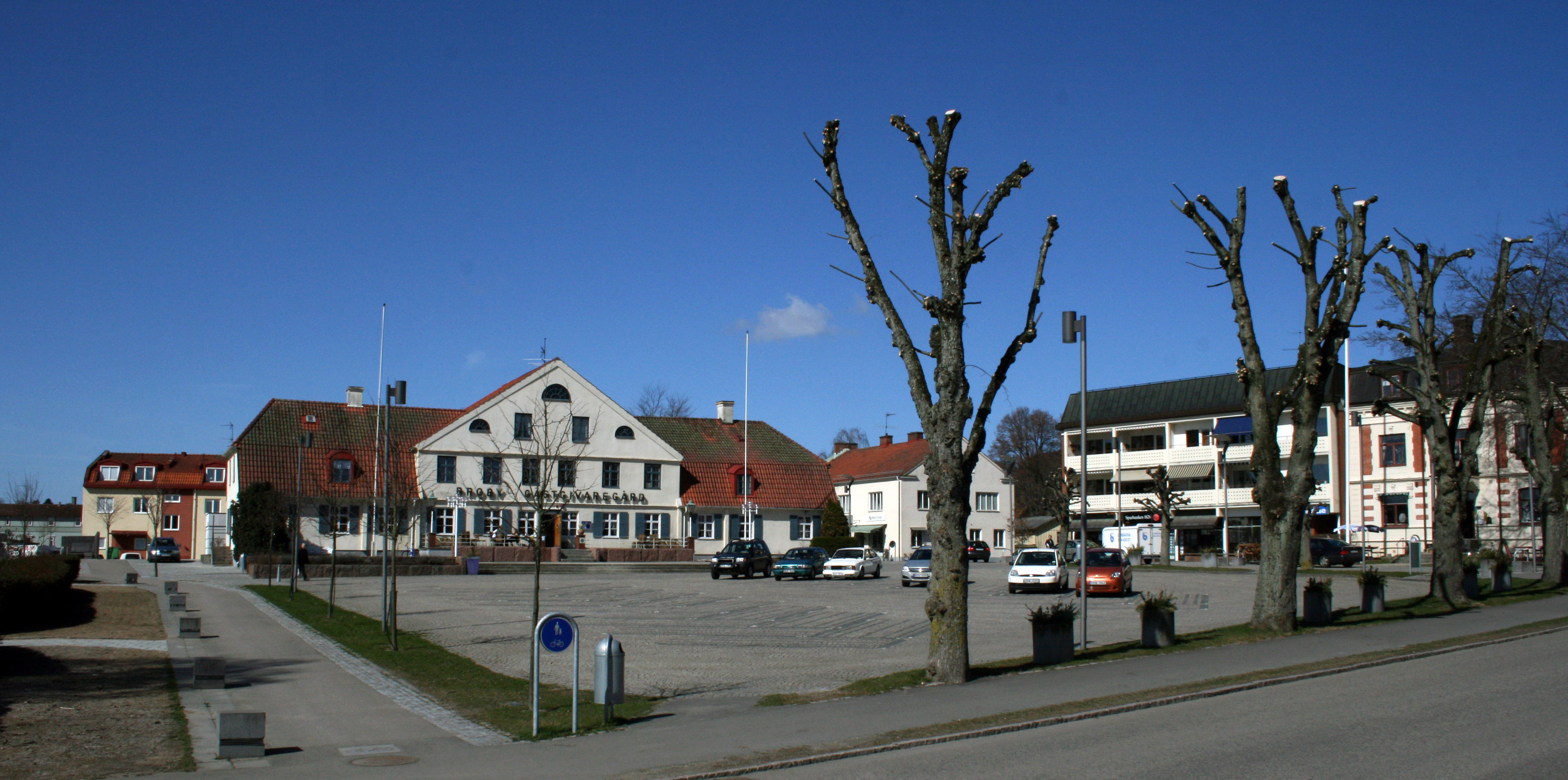
- Broby in April 2010

- Location within Scania Location within Sweden Location within European Union
- Coordinates: 56°15′N 14°04′E
- Country: Sweden
- Province: Scania
- County: Scania County
- Municipality: Östra Göinge Municipality

Area
  - Total: 3.68 km^{2} (1.42 sq mi)

Population (2020)
  - Total: 3,561
  - Density: 792/km^{2} (2,050/sq mi)
- Time zone: UTC+1 (CET)
  - Summer (DST): UTC+2 (CEST)

Broby (Swedish pronunciation: [ˈbrûːbʏ]) is a locality and the seat of Östra Göinge Municipality, Scania County, Sweden with 3,561 inhabitants in 2020.
