= Östanå, Östra Göinge =

Östanå
- Location within Skåne Location within Sweden
- Coordinates: 56°18′N 14°01′E
- Country: Sweden
- Province: Scania
- County: Scania County
- Municipality: Östra Göinge Municipality

Area
  - Total: 0.59 km^{2} (0.23 sq mi)

Population (2005-12-31)
  - Total: 221
  - Density: 376/km^{2} (970/sq mi)
- Time zone: UTC+1 (CET)
  - Summer (DST): UTC+2 (CEST)

Östanå is a village situated in Östra Göinge Municipality, Scania County, Sweden with 221 inhabitants in 2005. It has a river going through the middle of it called Heldge river. There is also a school called Möllarps förskola. It is a kindergarten. During christmas times there is a christmas market with tons of stuff to buy in Stenhuset. Stenhuset is a big house which hosts most events. It is right over the bridge.
