= Amos Matteucci =

Italian javelin thrower

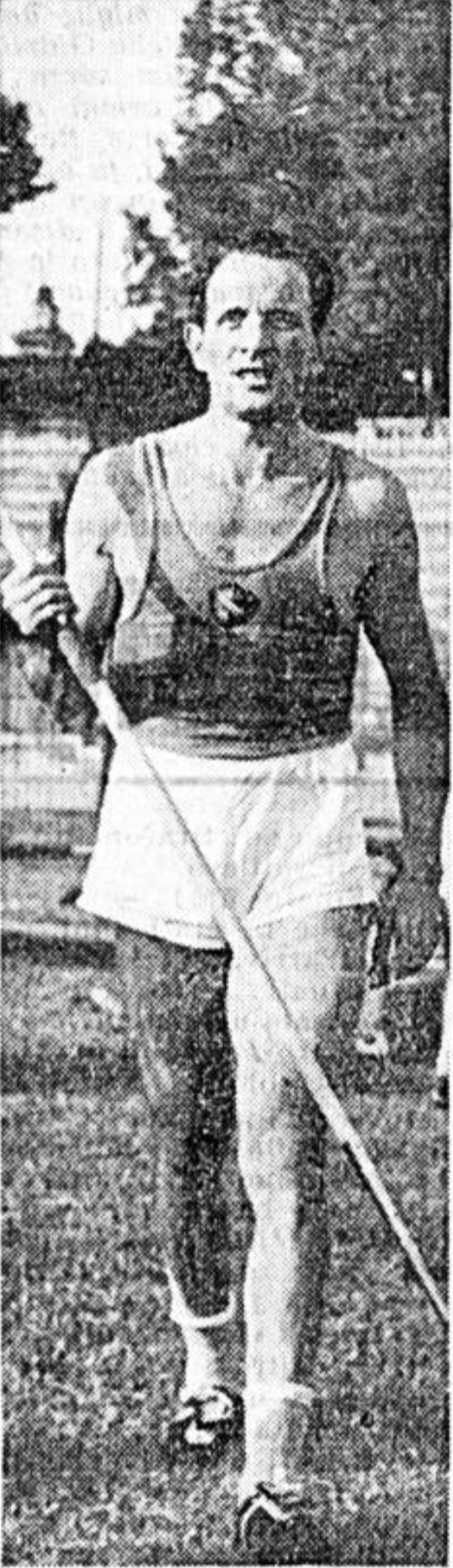

Personal information
- Nationality: Italy
- Born: 1 September 1915 Jesi, Ancona, Italy
- Died: 26 December 2008 (aged 93) Rome, Italy
- Height: 183 cm (6 ft 0 in)
- Weight: 80 kg (176 lb)

Sport
- Sport: Athletics
- Event: Javelin throw
- Club: CUS Roma

Amos Matteucci (20 March 1915 - 26 December 2008) was an Italian javelin thrower who competed at the 1952 Summer Olympics.

== Biography ==
Matteucci won eight national javelin throw championships at individual senior level in 1942, 1945, 1946, 1948, 1949, 1950, 1951 and 1952.

Matteucci won the British AAA Championships title in the javelin throw event at the 1951 AAA Championships.

== Achievements ==
Year	Competition	Venue	Position	Event	Measure	Notes
1950	European Championships	(Belgium) Brussels	6th	Javelin throw	64.99 m	
1952	Olympic Games	(Finland) Helsinki	17th	Javelin throw	61.67 m	
