= Hjärsås =

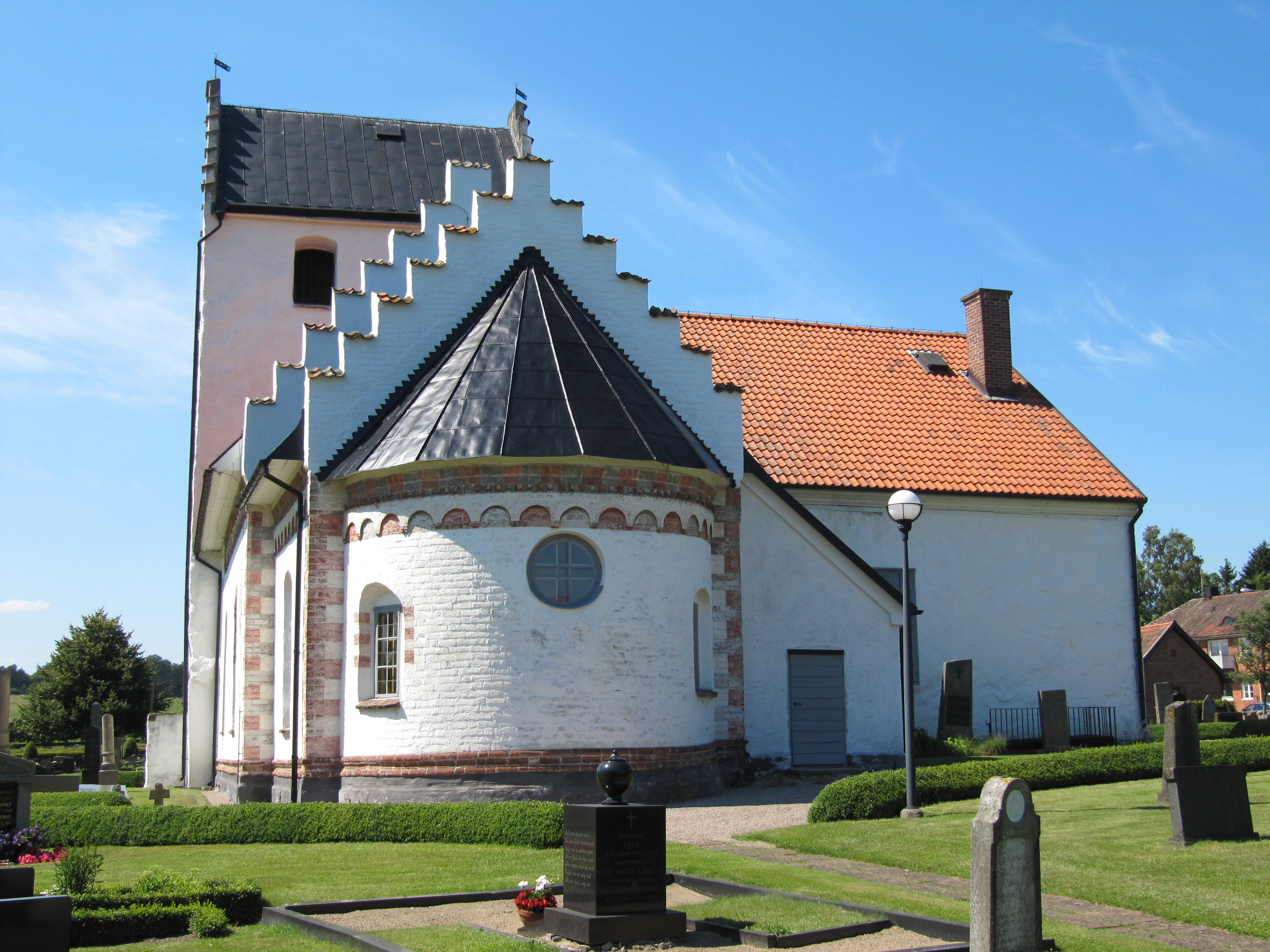
- Hjärsås Church

- Location within Scania Location within Sweden Location within European Union
- Coordinates: 56°12′N 14°09′E
- Country: Sweden
- Province: Scania
- County: Scania County
- Municipality: Östra Göinge Municipality

Area
  - Total: 0.39 km^{2} (0.15 sq mi)

Population (31 December 2010)
  - Total: 229
  - Density: 582/km^{2} (1,510/sq mi)
- Time zone: UTC+1 (CET)
  - Summer (DST): UTC+2 (CEST)

Hjärsås is a locality situated in Östra Göinge Municipality, Scania County, Sweden with 229 inhabitants in 2010.
