= Vladimir Kuznetsov (javelin thrower) =

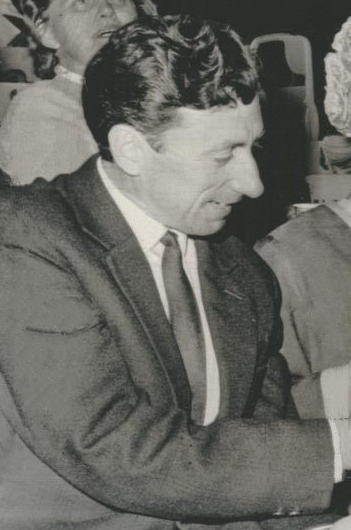
- Kuznetsov in 1964

Personal information
- Born: 2 April 1931 Leningrad, Soviet Union
- Died: 29 August 1986 (aged 55)
- Height: 185 cm (6 ft 1 in)
- Weight: 82 kg (181 lb)

Sport
- Sport: Athletics
- Event: Javelin throw

Achievements and titles
- Personal best: 85.64 m (1962)
Medal record
Men's athletics
Representing Soviet Union
European Championships
Silver medal – second place	1954 Bern	Javelin throw

Vladimir Vasilyevich Kuznetsov (Russian: Владимир Васильевич Кузнецов; 2 April 1931 – 29 August 1986) was a Soviet Russian javelin thrower.

Kuznetsov competed in the Olympics three times, in 1952, 1956 and 1964, qualifying for the final on all three occasions and placing sixth in 1952. He won the silver medal at the 1954 European Championships. Track & Field News ranked him among the world's top 10 javelin throwers 11 times in its annual rankings, with a peak ranking of No. 2 in 1961. Kuznetsov was married to the actress Tatyana Konyukhova.
