= Zbigniew Radziwonowicz =

Polish javelin thrower

Personal information
- Full name: Zbigniew Marian Radziwonowicz
- Nickname: Shaman
- Nationality: Polish
- Born: 8 December 1930 Łąck Wysoki, Poland (modern-day Belarus)
- Died: 11 December 2002 (aged 72) Warsaw, Poland
- Height: 1.78 m (5 ft 10 in)
- Weight: 84 kg (185 lb)

Sport
- Sport: Athletics
- Event: Javelin throw
- Club: Ogniwo Białystok; Legia Warsaw
- Coached by: Zygmunt Szelest

Zbigniew Marian Radziwonowicz (8 December 1930 – 11 December 2002) was a Polish athlete. He competed in the men's javelin throw at the 1952 Summer Olympics and the 1960 Summer Olympics.

His personal best in the old model javelin was 77.65 metres set in Warsaw in 1957.

== International competitions ==
Year	Competition	Venue	Position	Notes
Representing Poland
1952	Olympic Games	Helsinki, Finland	20th (q)	61.50 m
1953	World Festival of Youth and Students	Bucharest, Romania	3rd	69.51 m
1954	World Student Games	Budapest, Hungary	2nd	70.46 m
1954	European Championships	Bern, Switzerland	7th	69.84 m
1958	European Championships	Stockholm, Sweden	10th	71.20 m
1960	Olympic Games	Rome, Italy	7th	77.31 m
