= Cy Young (javelin thrower) =

American javelin thrower

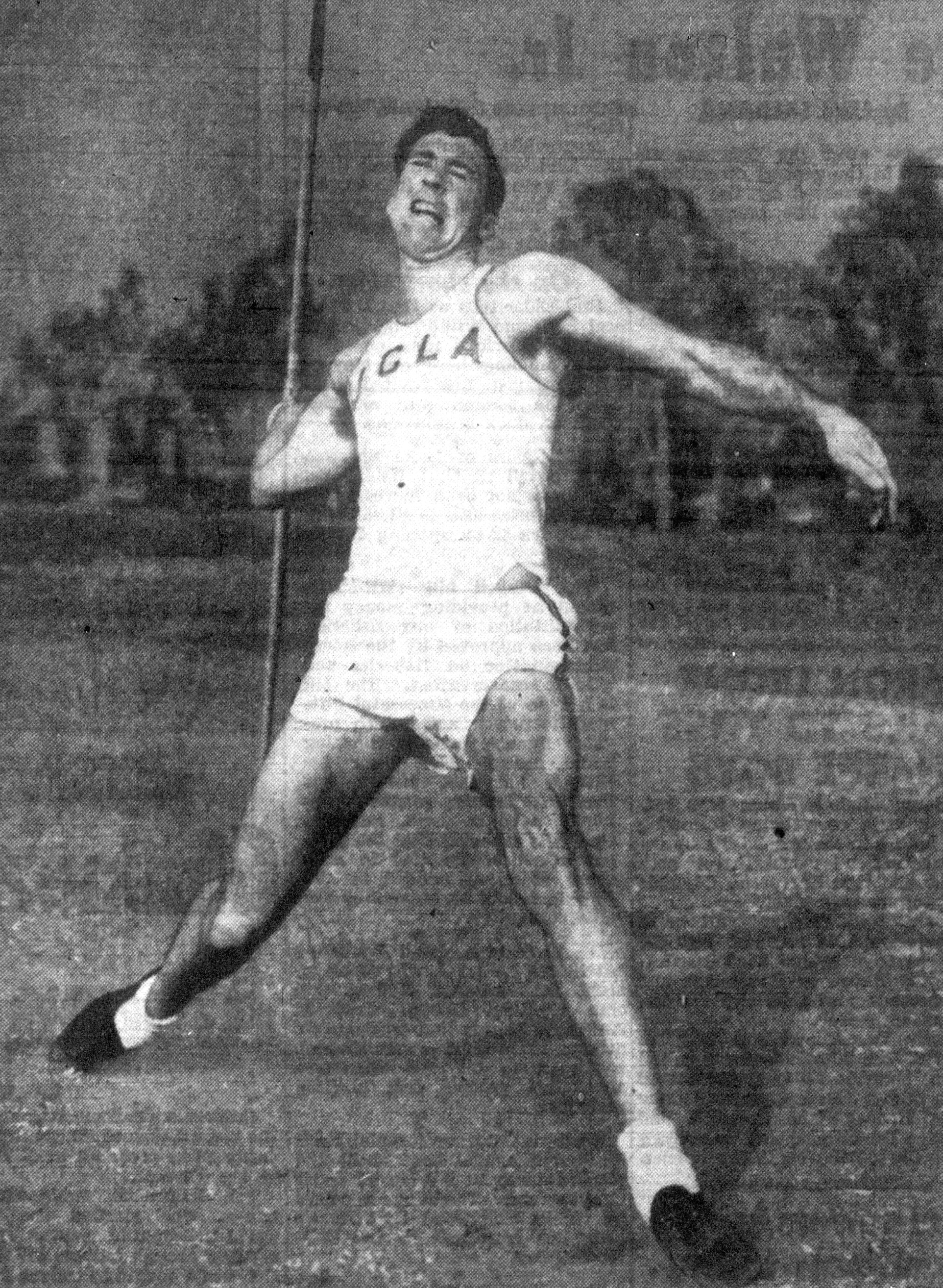
- Young, circa 1950

Personal information
- Born: July 23, 1928 Modesto, California, US
- Died: December 6, 2017 (aged 89) Modesto, California, US
- Height: 6 ft 5 in (1.96 m)
Medal record
Men's athletics
Representing the United States
Olympic Games
| Gold medal – first place | 1952 Helsinki | Javelin throw |

Cy C. Young Jr. (July 23, 1928 – December 6, 2017) was an American athlete who competed mainly in the javelin throw. He is the only American male to earn Olympic gold in the event.

== Early life ==
Young was born and raised in Modesto, California. He suffered from asthma as a boy.

== College and athletics ==
Young dabbled in the javelin at Modesto Junior College, where he attended for two years. He started throwing seriously after entering UCLA in 1948; in 1950 he placed second behind Bud Held at the NCAA championships. He was a member of the Sigma Nu fraternity.

Young graduated from UCLA in 1951. In 1952 he set a new US record of 256 feet 4 inches (78.13 meters) in the javelin.

Young competed at age 24 in the javelin throw for the US at the 1952 Summer Olympic Games in Helsinki, Finland, where he won the gold medal on his birthday.

Young continued to throw during his mid-20s, and four years later prepared to defend his Olympic title. In April 1956, Young had the best throw of his career with 259 ft 8.5 in (79.159 m). Later in the season, he won his only AAU championship. Because the Olympics were being in held in the Southern hemisphere – where the seasons are "reversed" in comparison to America and Europe – the Summer Games were delayed until late November, which was months after the track & field outdoor season typically ended.

A few months before the Melbourne Games, Poland's Janusz Sidło – the 1954 European Champion – pushed the javelin world record out to 274 ft 5.75 in (83.6613 m). Nonetheless, Young headed to Melbourne, Australia as one of the favorites. Three days before the competition he twisted an ankle which caused him pain as he "planted" his leg to release his throw.

There were 21 throwers from 12 nations entered in the morning qualifying round on Monday November 26. The qualifying distance was set at 66 meters- anyone who threw 66 metres (216 feet 6 inches) or better automatically advanced to the Finals. Young advance to the finals, but was only able to throw 68.64m, well below his normal, good for 11th place.

== Honors and awards ==
Young was "named Southern California's Athlete of the Year for 1952, a competition that included the region's professional athletes as well, and missed winning the Sullivan Award by a single vote."

Young was inducted into the UCLA Athletics Hall of Fame in 1998. He was also inducted into the Modesto Junior College Hall of Fame.

== Personal life and death ==
Young was a fourth generation farmer who grew walnuts and almonds. He and his wife, Elizabeth, resided in Modesto. His daughter, Jenifer, managed his business matters.

Young died on December 6, 2017, at age 89 due to complications from vascular dementia.
