= 1950 European Athletics Championships – Men's javelin throw =

Men's javelin throw at the European Athletics Championships

The men's javelin throw at the 1950 European Athletics Championships was held in Brussels, Belgium, at Heysel Stadium on 26 and 27 August 1950.

== Medalists ==
Gold	Toivo Hyytiäinen; Finland
Silver	Per-Arne Berglund; Sweden
Bronze	Ragnar Ericzon; Sweden

== Results ==
=== Final ===
27 August

Rank	Name	Nationality	Result	Notes
1st place, gold medalist(s)	Toivo Hyytiäinen	Finland	71.26	
2nd place, silver medalist(s)	Per-Arne Berglund	Sweden	70.06	
3rd place, bronze medalist(s)	Ragnar Ericzon	Sweden	69.82	
4	Mirko Vujacic	Yugoslavia	66.84	
5	Tapio Rautavaara	Finland	66.20	
6	Amos Matteucci	Italy	64.99	
7	Erwin Pektor	Austria	62.13	
8	Nico Lutkeveld	Netherlands	61.50	
9	Viktor Iyevlev	Soviet Union	58.59	

=== Qualification ===
26 August

Rank	Name	Nationality	Result	Notes
1	Per-Arne Berglund	Sweden	68.49	Q
2	Toivo Hyytiäinen	Finland	68.02	Q
3	Tapio Rautavaara	Finland	67.36	Q
4	Ragnar Ericzon	Sweden	65.29	Q
5	Mirko Vujacic	Yugoslavia	63.74	Q
6	Erwin Pektor	Austria	63.51	Q
7	Amos Matteucci	Italy	61.63	Q
8	Viktor Iyevlev	Soviet Union	61.25	Q
9	Nico Lutkeveld	Netherlands	60.66	Q
10	Halil Zıraman	Turkey	60.46	
11	Branko Dangubić	Yugoslavia	59.37	
12	Jóel Sigurðsson	Iceland	58.87	
13	Vasilios Kalimanis	Greece	54.28	
14	Raymond van Eycken	Belgium	52.82	
15	Ernst Lüthi	Switzerland	51.54	
16	Raymond Prud'homme	Belgium	46.35	

== Participation ==
According to an unofficial count, 16 athletes from 12 countries participated in the event.

- Austria (1)
- Belgium (2)
- Finland (2)
- Greece (1)
- Iceland (1)
- Italy (1)
- Netherlands (1)
- Soviet Union (1)
- Sweden (2)
- Switzerland (1)
- Turkey (1)
- Yugoslavia (2)
