= Glimåkra =

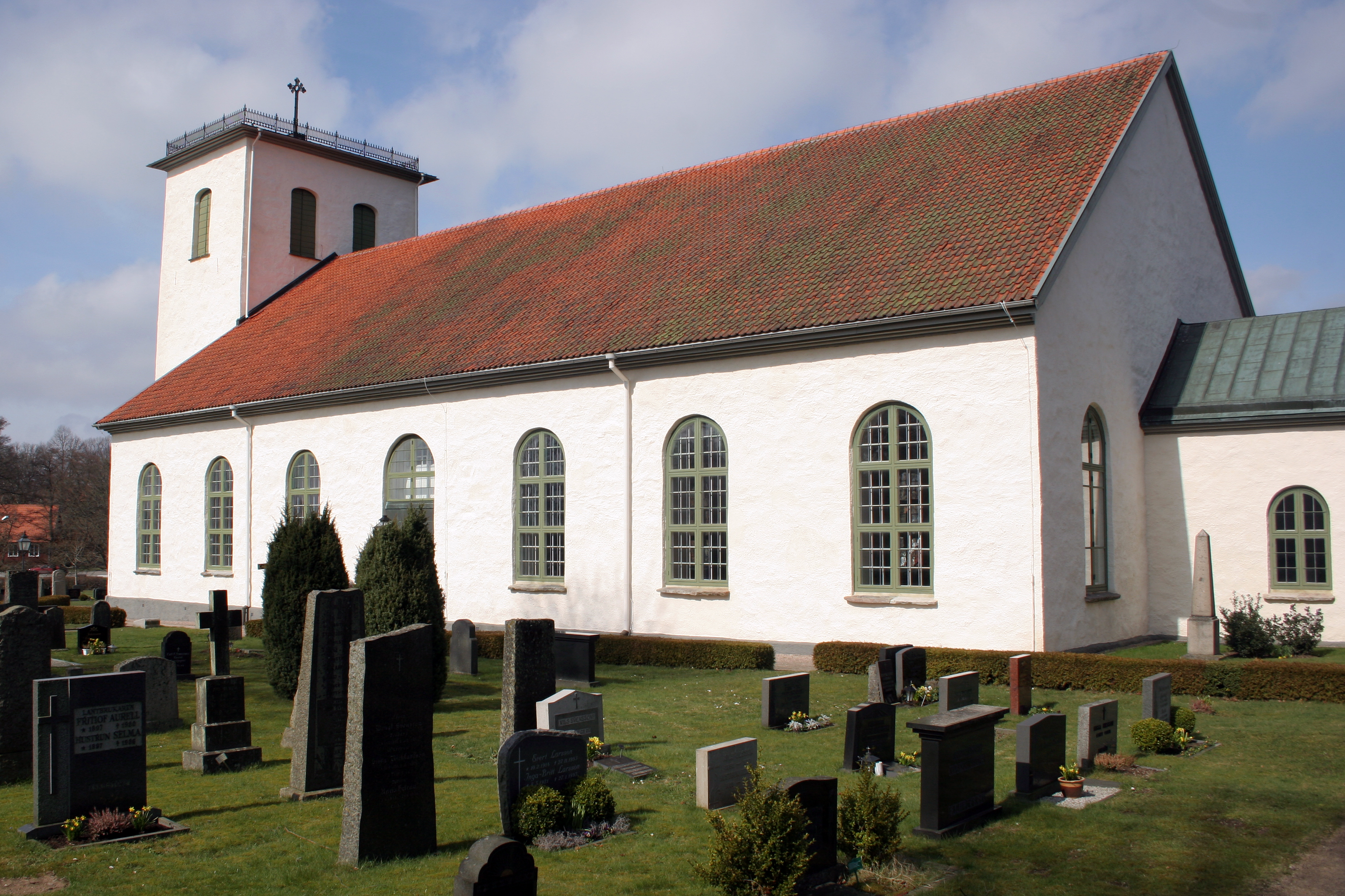
- Glimåkra Church

- Location within Scania Location within Sweden Location within European Union
- Coordinates: 56°18′N 14°08′E
- Country: Sweden
- Province: Scania
- County: Scania County
- Municipality: Östra Göinge Municipality

Area
  - Total: 1.86 km^{2} (0.72 sq mi)

Population (31 December 2010)
  - Total: 1,383
  - Density: 745/km^{2} (1,930/sq mi)
- Time zone: UTC+1 (CET)
  - Summer (DST): UTC+2 (CEST)

Glimåkra is a locality situated in Östra Göinge Municipality, Scania County, Sweden with 1,383 inhabitants in 2010.

The hiking trail Skåneleden's oldest section, SL1 Kust till kust (Coast to coast) passes just north of the village, also featuring a smaller path leading to it from Trollabadet. As hikers approach the village from the east, the landscape transitions from dense woodland to bright and rocky pastures. The path continues westwards towards Osby, passing through the nearby Trollabackarnas forest.
