= Hanaskog =

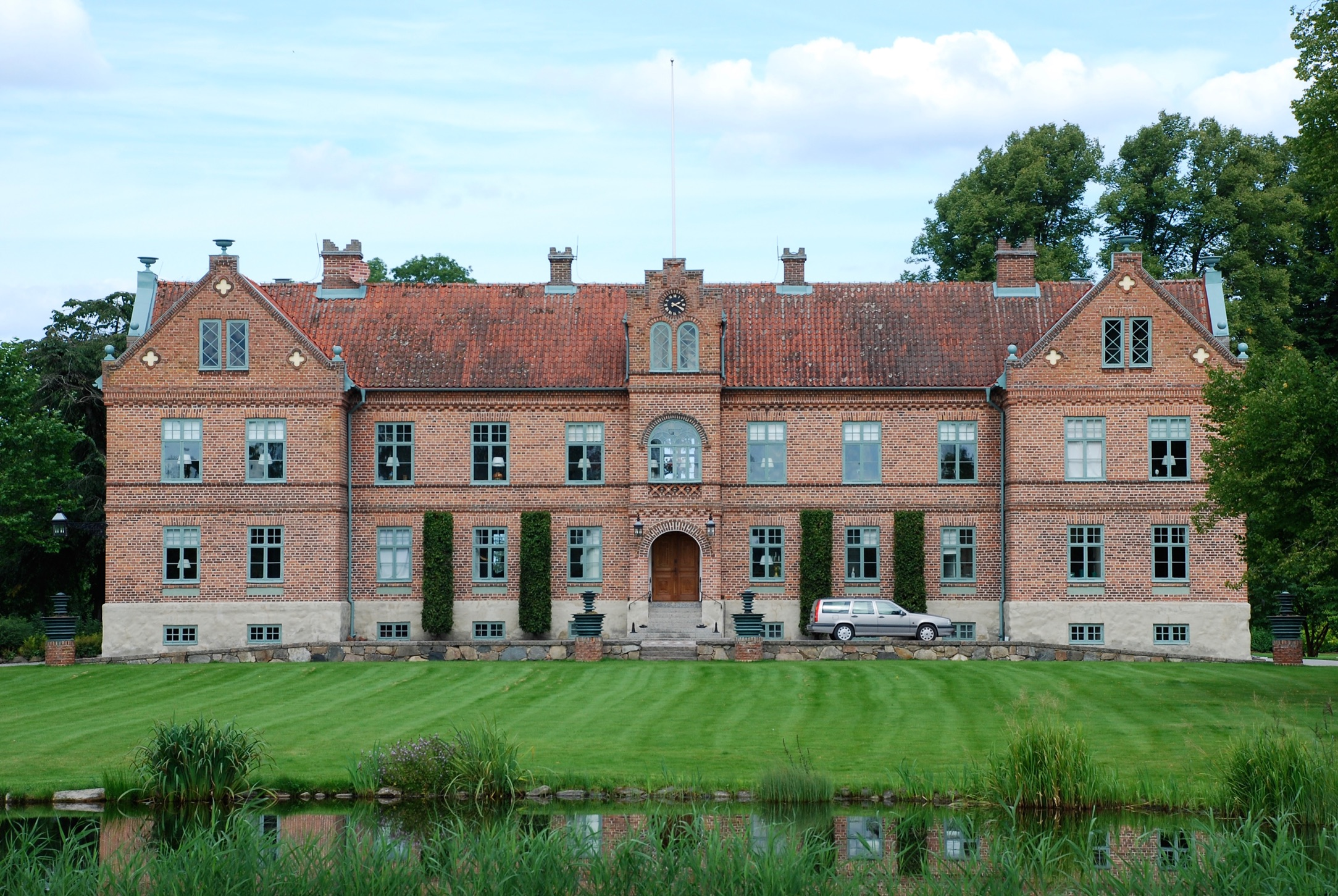
- Hanaskog Castle

- Location within Scania Location within Sweden Location within European Union
- Coordinates: 56°09′N 14°07′E
- Country: Sweden
- Province: Scania
- County: Scania County
- Municipality: Östra Göinge Municipality

Area
  - Total: 1.37 km^{2} (0.53 sq mi)

Population (31 December 2010)
  - Total: 1,251
  - Density: 913/km^{2} (2,360/sq mi)
- Time zone: UTC+1 (CET)
  - Summer (DST): UTC+2 (CEST)

Hanaskog is a locality situated in Östra Göinge Municipality, Scania County, Sweden with 1,251 inhabitants in 2010.
