= Gullbrand Sjöström =

Swedish javelin thrower (born 1926)

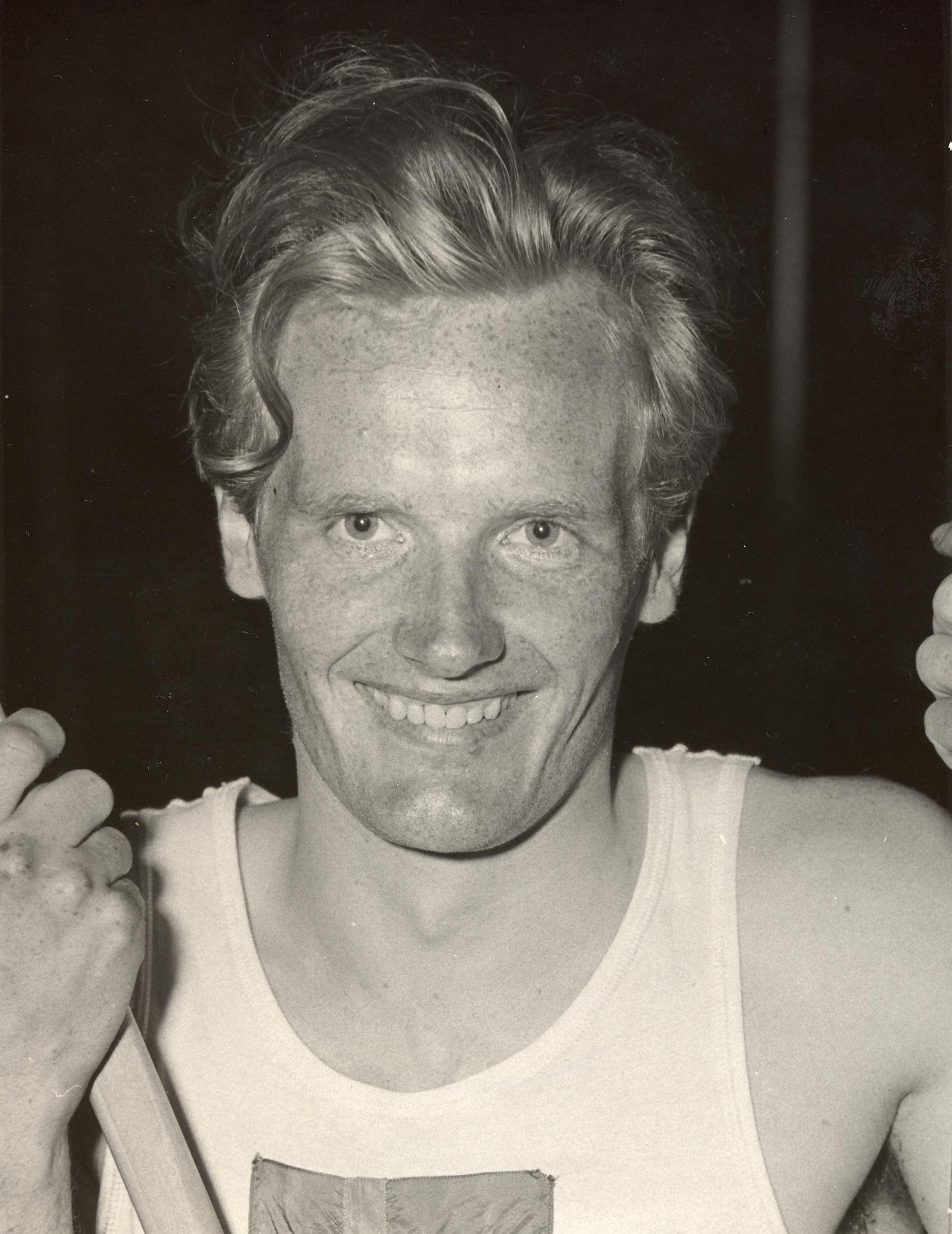

Personal information
- Born: 6 October 1926 (age 99) Skellefteå, Sweden

Sport
- Sport: Athletics
- Event: Javelin throw
- Club: Skellefteå AIK

Achievements and titles
- Personal best: 74.64 m

Guldbrand Nikolaus Sjöström (born 6 October 1926) is a Swedish retired javelin thrower. He placed sixth at the 1954 European Championships and second-fifth at the national championships of 1953–57.
