= Otto Bengtsson =

Swedish javelin thrower

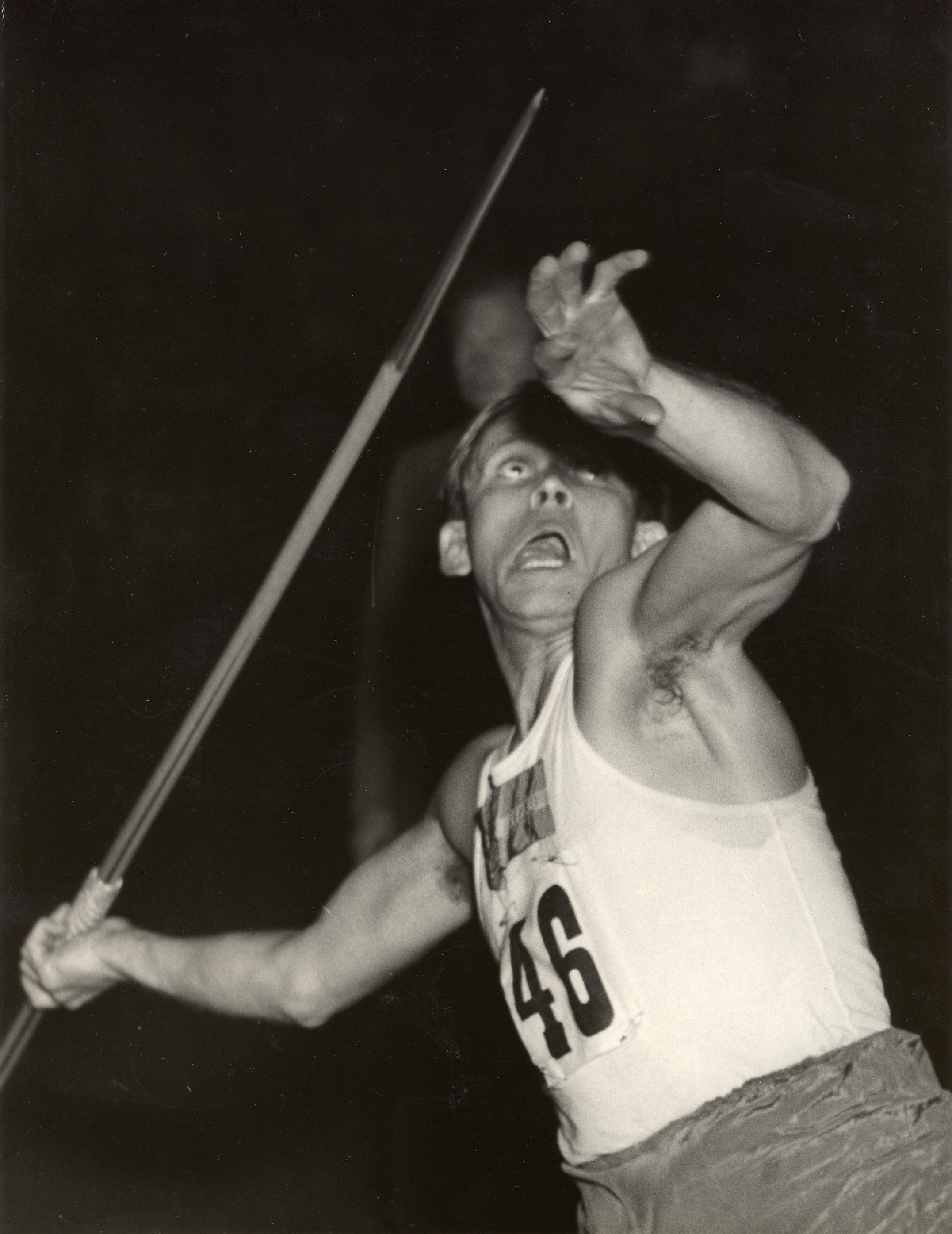

Personal information
- Born: 20 August 1921 Fjälkestad, Kristianstad, Sweden
- Died: 4 June 1998 (aged 76) Knislinge, Sweden

Sport
- Sport: Athletics
- Event: Javelin throw
- Club: IFK Knislinge

Achievements and titles
- Personal best: 75.55 (1954)

Otto Bernhard Bengtsson (20 August 1921 – 4 June 1998) was a Swedish javelin thrower who won the national title in 1953. He competed at the 1952 Summer Olympics and 1954 European Athletics Championships and finished in 11th and 5th place, respectively.
