= Knislinge =

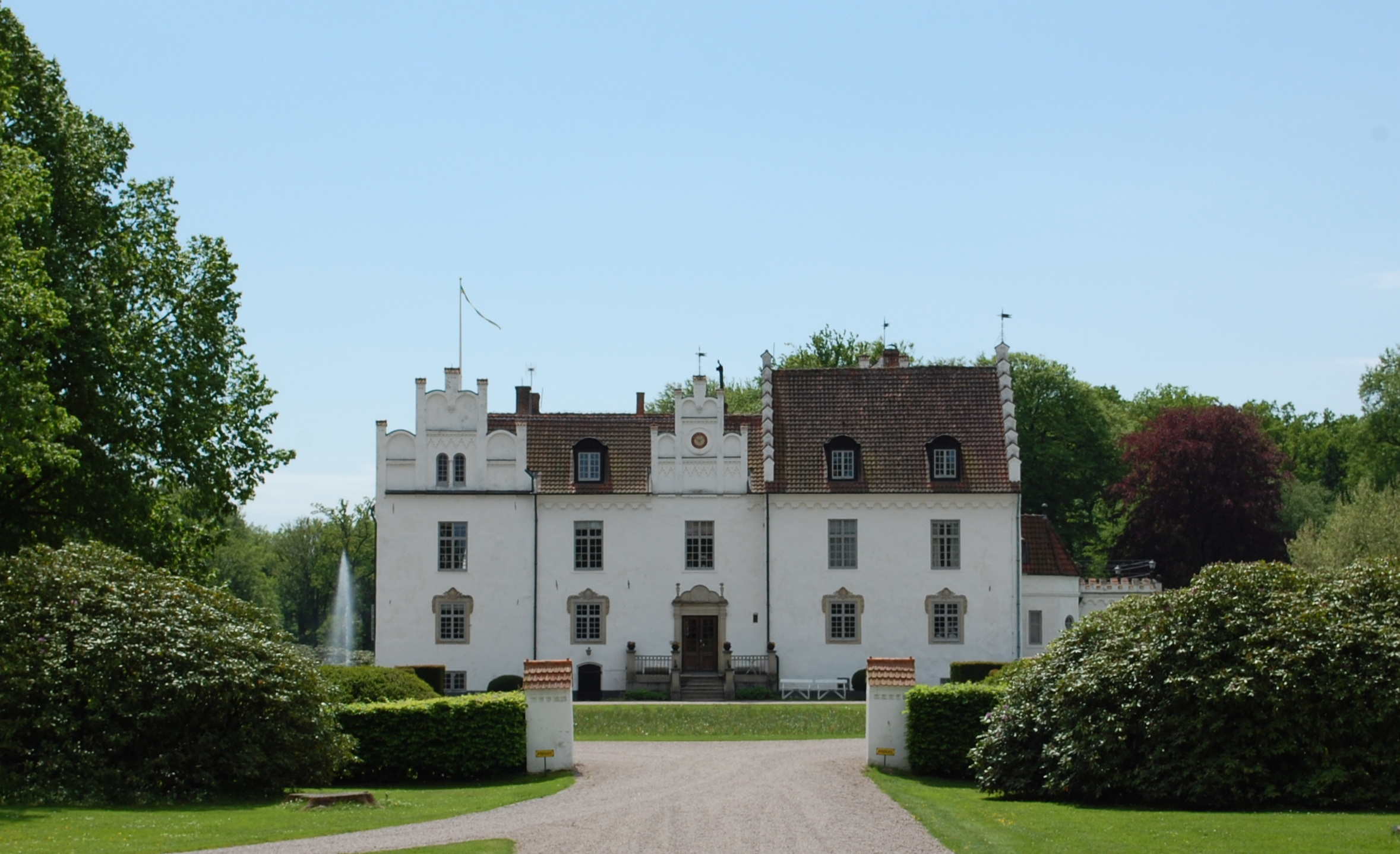
- Wanås Castle in Knislinge

- Location within Scania Location within Sweden Location within European Union
- Coordinates: 56°11′N 14°05′E
- Country: Sweden
- Province: Scania
- County: Scania
- Municipality: Östra Göinge

Area
  - Total: 2.73 km^{2} (1.05 sq mi)

Population (31 December 2010)
  - Total: 3,030
  - Density: 1,110/km^{2} (2,900/sq mi)
- Time zone: UTC+1 (CET)
  - Summer (DST): UTC+2 (CEST)

Knislinge (Swedish pronunciation: [ˈknɪ̂sːlɪŋɛ]) is a locality situated in Östra Göinge Municipality, Scania County, Sweden with 3,030 inhabitants in 2010.

Knislinge Church is a well-preserved medieval church, containing a large number of medieval frescos.
