= Per-Arne Berglund =

Swedish javelin thrower

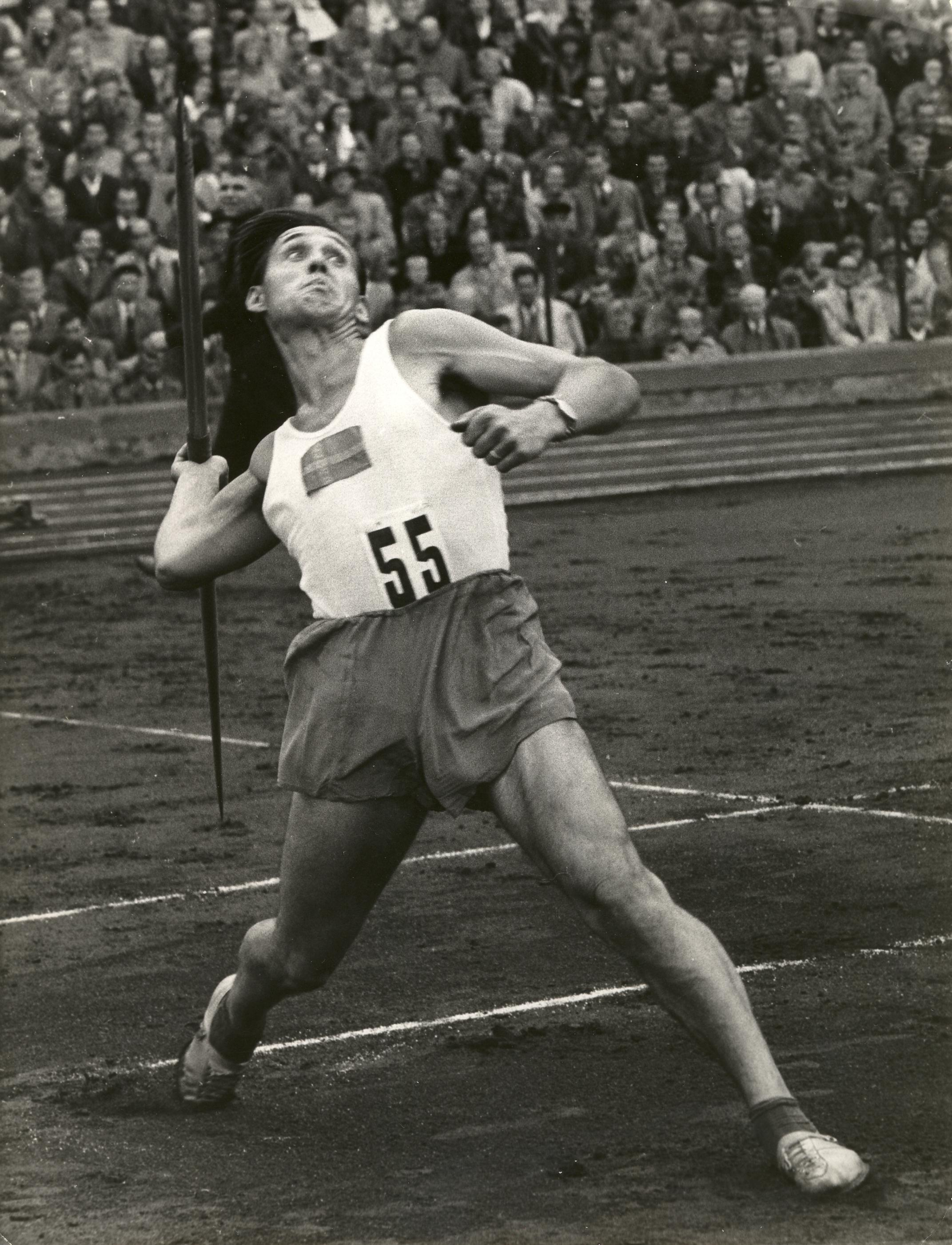

Personal information
- Born: 20 January 1927 Örebro, Sweden
- Died: 6 January 2002 (aged 74) Örebro, Sweden
- Height: 1.80 m (5 ft 11 in)
- Weight: 84 kg (185 lb)

Sport
- Sport: Athletics
- Event: Javelin throw
- Club: IF Start, Örebro

Achievements and titles
- Personal best: 75.25 m (1951)
Medal record
Men's athletics
Representing Sweden
European Championships
Silver medal – second place	1950 Brussels	Javelin throw

Per-Arne Berglund (20 January 1927 – 6 January 2002) was a Swedish javelin thrower who won a silver medal at the 1950 European Athletics Championships. He competed at the 1948 and 1952 Summer Olympics and finished in tenth place each time. Berglund was ranked first in the world in 1949. He won the Swedish national title in 1950–52 and 1955–57.
