= Soini Nikkinen =

Finnish javelin thrower (1923–2012)

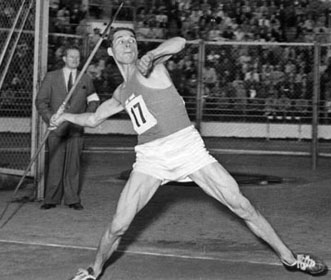

Personal information
- Born: 19 July 1923 Kiuruvesi, Finland
- Died: 2 June 2012 (aged 88)
- Height: 184 cm (6 ft 0 in)
- Weight: 84 kg (185 lb)

Sport
- Sport: Athletics
- Event: Javelin throw
- Club: Lahden Kaleva, Lahti

Achievements and titles
- Personal best: 83.56 (1956)
Medal record
Men's athletics
Representing Finland
European Championships
Bronze medal – third place	1954 Bern	Javelin throw

Soini Mikael Nikkinen (19 July 1923 – 2 June 2012) was a Finnish javelin thrower who won a bronze medal at the 1954 European Championships. He placed 12th and 8th at the 1948 and 1952 Summer Olympics, respectively. On 24 June 1956, he set a new world record at 83.56 m, which was beaten six days later by Janusz Sidło.
