= Ragnar Ericzon =

Swedish javelin thrower

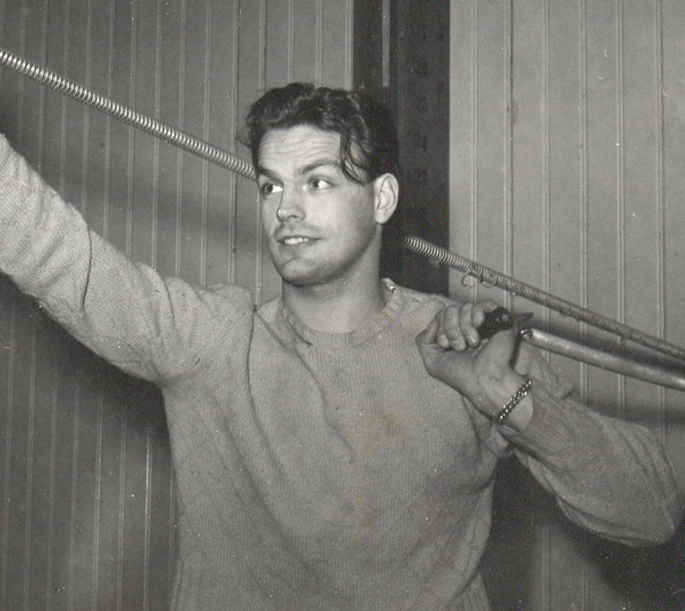

Personal information
- Born: 5 June 1926 Vikmanshyttan, Sweden
- Died: 5 March 2010 (aged 83) Örebro, Sweden
- Height: 1.82 m (6 ft 0 in)
- Weight: 85 kg (187 lb)

Sport
- Sport: Athletics
- Event: Javelin throw
- Club: IF Start, Örebro

Achievements and titles
- Personal best: 73.93 m (1950)
Medal record
Men's athletics
Representing Sweden
European Championships
Bronze medal – third place	1950 Brussels	Javelin throw

Ragnar Sven Ericzon (5 June 1926 – 5 March 2010) was a Swedish javelin thrower who won a bronze medal at the 1950 European Athletics Championships. He competed at the 1952 Summer Olympics and finished in seventh place.
