= Östra Göinge Municipality =

Östra Göinge Municipality Östra Göinge kommun
- Municipality
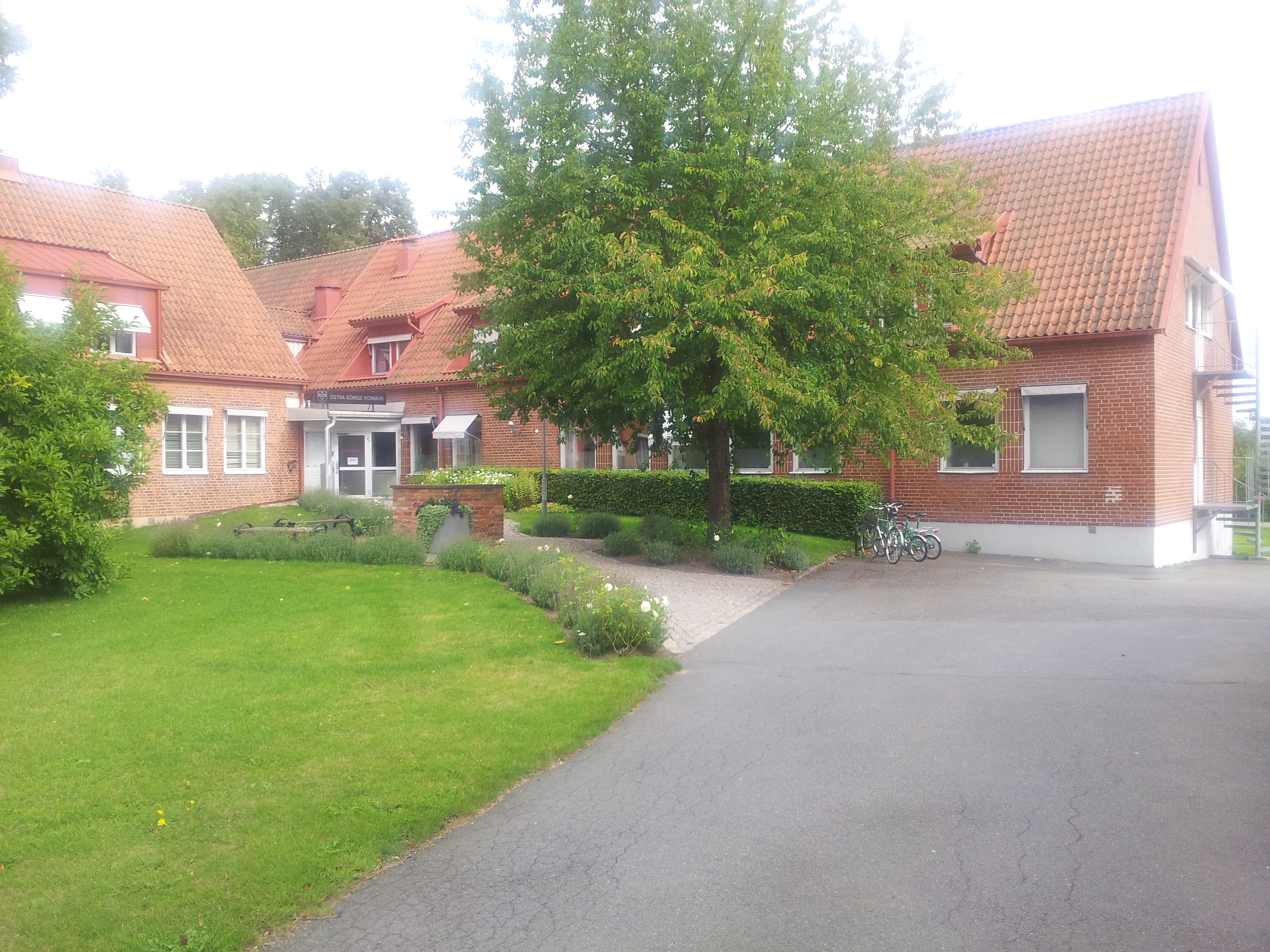
- Östra Göinge municipal building

- Coat of arms

- Coordinates: 56°15′N 14°04′E
- Country: Sweden
- County: Scania
- Seat: Broby

Area
  - Total: 451.15 km^{2} (174.19 sq mi)
  - Land: 431.96 km^{2} (166.78 sq mi)
  - Water: 19.19 km^{2} (7.41 sq mi)
- Area as of 1 January 2014.

Population (30 June 2025)
  - Total: 13,810
  - Density: 31.97/km^{2} (82.80/sq mi)
- Time zone: UTC+1 (CET)
  - Summer (DST): UTC+2 (CEST)
- ISO 3166 code: SE
- Province: Scania
- Municipal code: 1256
- Website: www.ostragoinge.se

Östra Göinge Municipality (Swedish: Östra Göinge kommun) is a municipality in Scania County in southern Sweden. Its seat is located in Broby.

The present municipality was formed in 1974 when the former municipalities of Broby, Glimåkra, Hjärsås and Knislinge were amalgamated.

There are 8 smaller population centers (urban areas) in the municipality, where approximately 80 percent of the population lives, surrounded by sparsely populated rural areas.

== Geography ==
Östra Göinge Municipality is part of Göinge, a region in northern Scania which borders the provinces of Småland and Blekinge. It is a densely forested area with deciduous and coniferous trees, interspersed with open agricultural land. The river Helgeån runs through the municipality.

=== Localities ===
There are 8 urban areas (also called a Tätort or locality) in Östra Göinge Municipality. In the table they are listed according to the size of the population as of December 31, 2005. The municipal seat is in bold characters.

#	Locality	Population
1	Knislinge	3,016
2	**Broby**	2,931
3	Glimåkra	1,483
4	Sibbhult	1,383
5	Hanaskog	1,316
6	Immeln	291
7	Hjärsås	233
8	Östanå	221

== History ==
The Snapphane, Scanian resistance fighters of 17th century, took refuge in the forests of Östra Göinge. Considered rebels and bandits by the Swedish army, the Snapphanar were protected by the local population and their bravery is still cherished in the municipality. All of Göingebygden endured hardship and suffered devastation during the times after the Treaty of Roskilde in 1658, during Scania's transition from being a Danish to becoming a Swedish ruled territory.

The dialect of Göingebygden has historically been distinguishable from the southern Scanian dialects as well as the northern Småland dialects, perhaps because the population took pride in the area's historical autonomy and resilient resistance.

The coat of arms for Östra Göinge depicts two palm branches crossing each other, a traditional symbol of peace and unity designed for and given to the area after it became Swedish. The lower part of the coat of arms depicts hammers, and was added when the municipality was joined with an adjacent municipality in 1976.

== Demographics ==
This is a demographic table based on Östra Göinge Municipality's electoral districts in the 2022 Swedish general election sourced from SVT's election platform, in turn taken from SCB official statistics.

In total there were 14,920 residents, including 10,574 Swedish citizens of voting age. 35.1% voted for the left coalition and 63.8% for the right coalition. Indicators are in percentage points except population totals and income.

Location	Residents	Citizen adults	Left vote	Right vote	Employed	Swedish parents	Foreign heritage	Income SEK	Degree
Location			%	%					
Broby V	2,253	1,565	31.8	66.6	74	75	25	23,067	29
Broby Ö	2,204	1,537	38.2	59.8	71	71	29	20,508	28
Glimåkra	2,371	1,692	34.6	64.8	76	80	20	23,097	26
Hanaskog	1,649	1,045	39.4	59.4	71	63	37	20,666	24
Hjärsås	1,108	844	33.4	65.9	83	91	9	25,285	30
Knislinge V	1,990	1,505	34.8	64.3	84	86	14	24,244	28
Knislinge Ö	1,784	1,286	31.6	67.3	75	76	24	23,055	25
Sibbhult	1,561	1,100	37.1	61.9	68	73	27	20,315	20
Source: SVT

== Elections ==
Below are the results listed from since the 1973 municipal reform. Between 1988 and 1998 the Sweden Democrats' results were not published by the SCB due to the party's small size nationwide. "Turnout" denotes the percentage of the electorate casting a ballot, but "Votes" only applies to valid ballots cast.

=== Riksdag ===
Year	Turnout	Votes	V	S	MP	C	L	KD	M	SD	ND
1973	91.9	9,046	3.1	52.1	0.0	26.1	6.3	2.4	10.0	0.0	0.0
1976	92.1	9,583	2.5	51.7	0.0	24.4	8.0	2.0	11.3	0.0	0.0
1979	91.2	9,734	2.7	52.9	0.0	18.2	8.9	1.7	14.9	0.0	0.0
1982	91.8	9,857	2.9	54.9	1.3	16.2	5.5	2.0	16.9	0.0	0.0
1985	89.6	9,700	3.5	55.1	0.7	14.4	10.7	0.0	15.4	0.0	0.0
1988	85.7	9,244	3.8	56.1	4.3	11.6	8.7	3.1	12.1	0.0	0.0
1991	86.3	9,362	3.2	48.5	1.9	9.0	5.2	6.9	14.8	0.0	8.3
1994	86.5	9,371	4.6	57.7	3.9	8.0	3.8	4.0	16.0	0.0	1.2
1998	79.4	8,334	11.8	47.1	3.7	5.7	2.7	11.0	16.3	0.0	0.0
2002	78.2	8,038	7.3	49.0	3.4	6.9	7.8	9.3	12.5	2.1	0.0
2006	80.2	8,233	3.7	46.0	2.7	8.2	5.7	7.0	18.6	5.9	0.0
2010	83.6	8,645	3.5	36.4	4.3	6.2	6.0	4.2	24.8	13.7	0.0
2014	85.5	8,855	3.3	35.8	3.7	5.8	3.1	3.7	16.4	26.0	0.0

Blocs

This lists the relative strength of the socialist and centre-right blocs since 1973, but parties not elected to the Riksdag are inserted as "other", including the Sweden Democrats results from 1988 to 2006, but also the Christian Democrats pre-1991 and the Greens in 1982, 1985 and 1991. The sources are identical to the table above. The coalition or government mandate marked in bold formed the government after the election. New Democracy got elected in 1991 but are still listed as "other" due to the short lifespan of the party. "Elected" is the total number of percentage points from the municipality that went to parties who were elected to the Riksdag.

Year	Turnout	Votes	Left	Right	SD	Other	Elected
1973	91.9	9,046	**55.2**	42.4	0.0	2.4	97.6
1976	92.1	9,583	54.2	**43.7**	0.0	2.0	98.0
1979	91.2	9,734	55.6	**42.0**	0.0	2.4	97.6
1982	91.8	9,857	**57.8**	38.6	0.0	3.6	96.4
1985	89.6	9,700	**58.6**	40.5	0.0	0.9	99.1
1988	85.7	9,244	**64.2**	32.4	0.0	5.4	94.6
1991	86.3	9,362	51.7	**35.9**	0.0	12.4	96.0
1994	86.5	9,371	**66.2**	31.8	0.0	2.0	98.0
1998	79.4	8,334	**62.6**	35.7	0.0	1.7	98.3
2002	78.2	8,038	**59.7**	36.5	0.0	3.8	96.2
2006	80.2	8,233	52.4	**39.5**	0.0	8.1	91.9
2010	83.6	8,645	44.2	**41.2**	13.7	0.9	99.1
2014	85.5	8,855	**42.8**	29.0	26.0	2.2	97.8

== Industry ==
A famous, very fine-grained black diabase is mined in Östra Göinge. Because of the extremely high quality of the diabase from this area, it is in high demand worldwide and has become popular with artists all over the globe, one of the more well-known being Takashi Naraha from Japan. It is primarily used for gravestones, monuments, sculptures, and other forms of stone artworks, but also to decorate buildings. The Empire State Building is partly covered with diabase from the area and the US Marine Corps War Memorial has a foundation of diabase from Göingebygden.

Scania AB and Tarkett have a presence in Östra Göinge.
