= Herbert Koschel =

German javelin thrower

Personal information
- Nationality: German
- Born: 9 December 1921 Bolesławiec, Weimar Republic (present day Poland)
- Died: 2 August 1980 (aged 58) Koblenz, West Germany

Sport
- Sport: Athletics
- Event: Javelin throw

Herbert Koschel (9 December 1921 – 2 August 1980) was a German athlete. He competed in the men's javelin throw at the 1952 Summer Olympics and the 1956 Summer Olympics.
