= Toivo Hyytiäinen =

Finnish javelin thrower (1925–1978)

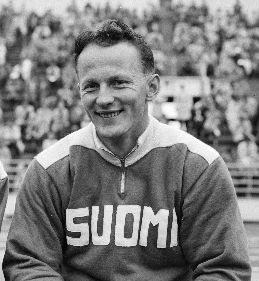
- Toivo Hyytiäinen at the 1952 Helsinki Olympics
- Born: 12 November 1925
- Died: 21 October 1978 (aged 52)
- Occupations: Athlete, mainly javelin

Toivo Hyytiäinen
Medal record

Men's athletics

Representing Finland

Olympic Games
Bronze medal – third place	1952 Helsinki	Javelin throw

European Championships
Gold medal – first place	1950 Brussels	Javelin throw

Toivo Armas Hyytiäinen (12 November 1925 in Saarijärvi – 21 October 1978) was a Finnish track and field athlete who competed mainly in the men's javelin throw.

He competed for Finland at the 1952 Summer Olympics held in Helsinki, Finland where he won the bronze medal in the men's javelin throw competition. He was also the 1950 European champion in men's javelin throw.
